= 1942 Birthday Honours =

British government recognitions

The King's Birthday Honours 1942 were appointments by King George VI to various orders and honours to reward and highlight good works by members of the British Empire. They were published on 5 June 1942 for the United Kingdom and Canada.

The recipients of honours are displayed here as they were styled before their new honour, and arranged by honour, with classes (Knight, Knight Grand Cross, etc.) and then divisions (Military, Civil, etc.) as appropriate.

== British Empire ==
=== Baron ===
- John Maynard Keynes, CB, FBA, Member of the Chancellor of the Exchequer's Consultative Council.

=== Privy Councillor ===
- George Henry Hall, MP, Financial Secretary, Admiralty.

=== Baronet ===
- The Right Honourable James Andrews, LLD, Lord Chief Justice of Northern Ireland.
- Admiral Sir Andrew Browne Cunningham, GCB, DSO, lately Commander-in-Chief, Mediterranean.
- Captain Austin Uvedale Morgan Hudson, MP, lately Civil Lord of the Admiralty.
- Thomas Harrison Hughes, Director of the Liner Division, Ministry of War Transport.
- Sir Francis L'Estrange Joseph, KBE, MIME, JP, DL. For public services.
- Geoffrey Hithersay Shakespeare, MP, lately Parliamentary Under-Secretary of State for Dominion Affairs.

=== Knight of the Garter ===
- Right Honourable Lawrence John Lumley, Marquess of Zetland, GCSI, GCIE.

=== Knight of the Thistle ===
- Major David Lyulph Gore Wolseley, Earl of Airlie, GCVO, MC.

=== Knight Bachelor ===
- Major Arthur Cecil Abrahams, CBE, Chairman of the Stores Committee, War Organisation of the British Red Cross Society and Order of St. John.
- Edward Samson Baron. For public and philanthropic services.
- Colonel Frank Benson, CVO, CBE, General Manager, Navy, Army and Air Force Institutes.
- William Bernard Blatch, MBE, Solicitor to the Board of Inland Revenue.
- His Honour Samuel Ronald Courthope Bosanquet, Official Referee of the Supreme Court.
- Geoffrey Duke Burton, Director-General, Mechanical Equipment, Ministry of Supply.
- John Clague, CMG, CIE, lately Adviser to the Secretary of State for India and Burma.
- George Frederick Cotton, CB, MVO, OBE, Under-Secretary, Admiralty.
- John Cornelius Joseph Dalton, AMIEE, FCIS, Fuel and Power Controller, London & South Eastern Region (Honorary Colonel, Royal Corps of Signals).
- Lieutenant-Colonel Ivan Buchanan Davson, OBE, TD, Chairman of the West India Committee.
- John McLean Duncanson, Deputy Iron & Steel Controller.
- Charles Richard Fairey, MBE, FRAeS, Chairman, Fairey Aviation Company. Director-General, British Air Commission, Washington.
- Professor Ralph Howard Fowler, OBE, FRS, Plummer Professor of Mathematical Physics in the University of Cambridge; lately Liaison Officer in North America.
- Thomas Peirson Frank, Co-ordinating Officer for Public Utility Services, London Civil Defence Region. Chief Engineer and County Surveyor, London County Council.
- Captain Frederick Edward French, RD, Royal Naval Reserve (Retd.), Commodore Commander, Peninsular and Oriental Steam Navigation Company.
- William Hamilton Fyfe, MA, LLD, Principal and Vice-Chancellor of the University of Aberdeen.
- Arthur Wilfrid Garrett, HM Chief Inspector of Factories, Ministry of Labour and National Service.
- Holbrook Gaskell, OBE, MIEE, AMIMechE, Director of the Board of Imperial Chemical Industries Ltd.
- William Gavin, CBE, Chief Agricultural Adviser, Ministry of Agriculture & Fisheries.
- Frederick Godber, Chairman of the Overseas Supply Committee, Petroleum Board, and Managing Director of the Shell Transport & Trading Co. Ltd.
- John Frederick Heaton, Chairman and Managing Director of Thomas Tilling Ltd. Member of the Inland Transport War Council.
- Robert Stewart Johnson, OBE, Chairman and Managing Director of Messrs. Cammell Laird & Co. Ltd, Shipbuilders.
- Alexander Korda, Film Producer and Managing Director, Alexander Korda Film Productions Ltd.
- William Oliphant MacArthur, CBE, Chief Divisional Food Officer, North-East England.
- Frederick Wolff Ogilvie, LLD, lately Director General, British Broadcasting Corporation.
- Frederick Handley Page, CBE, FRAeS, Managing Director, Handley Page Ltd. Vice-Chairman of the Air Registration Board.
- Professor William Fletcher Shaw, MD, FRCP, President, Royal College of Obstetricians and Gynaecologists.
- Edward Raymond Streat, CBE, Chairman of the Cotton Board.
- Henry Edward Sparke Upcher, Chairman, Norfolk War Agricultural Executive Committee.
- Robert Bryce Walker, CBE, Chairman of the Scottish Fire Commission. Commissioner for the Special Areas in Scotland.
- Robert Alexander Watson Watt, CB, Scientific Adviser on Telecommunications, Ministry of Aircraft Production.
- Ernest Maclagan Wedderburn, OBE, DSc, LLD, Deputy Keeper of His Majesty's Signet. For legal and public services in Scotland.
- Alderman Julian Osborn Whitehouse, Chairman of the Staffordshire County Council.
- Frederick Charles Yapp, Deputy Chairman of Vickers-Armstrongs Ltd. Acting Chairman of the English Steel Corporation Ltd.

Dominions

- Francis Joseph Edmund Beaurepaire, Lord Mayor of the City of Melbourne, State of Victoria.
- The Honourable Herbert Horace Olney, Member of the Legislative Council, State of Victoria.

India

- Biren Mookerjee, Partner, Martin & Co., Bengal.
- Dewan Tek Chand, Puisne Judge of the High Court of Judicature at Lahore, Punjab.
- Charles Bartley, Indian Civil Service, Puisne Judge of the High Court of Judicature at Fort William in Bengal.
- Janardan Atmaram Madan, CSI, CIE, Indian Civil Service, Chairman, Bombay Sind Public Service Commission, and lately Adviser to His Excellency the Governor of Bombay.
- Satyendra Nath Roy, CSI, CIE, Indian Civil Service, Secretary to the Government of India in the Department of Communications.
- John Hugh Francis Raper, Member, Transportation, Railway Department (Railway Board), Government of India.
- Theodore Emanuel Gregory, DSc, Economic Adviser to the Government of India.
- Major-General John Taylor, CIE, DSO, MD, DPH, Indian Medical Service, Director, Central Research Institute, Kasauli.
- Lawrence Mason, CIE, OBE, MC, Deputy Director General, Directorate General of Supply, Department of Supply, Government of India, and lately Inspector-General of Forests.
- Alexander John Happell, OBE, Inspector-General of Police, Madras.
- Randulph Meverel Statham, CIE, Director of Public Instruction, Madras.
- Sardar Bahadur Sardar Teja Singh Malik, CIE, Indian Service of Engineers, Chief Engineer, Central Public Works Department, Government of India.
- Khan Bahadur Nawab Malik Allah Bakhsh Khan Tiwana, MBE, Landlord and Member of the Punjab Legislative Assembly, Khwajabad, Shahpur District, Punjab.
- Robert Dale Denniston, Managing Director, Messrs. Best & Co. Ltd., Madras.
- Thomas Sinclair Kennedy, General Manager, Messrs. Glenfield & Kennedy, Hydraulic Engineers, Bombay.

Colonies, Protectorates, etc.

- Theodore Samuel Adams, CMG, Colonial Administrative Service, Chief Commissioner, Northern Provinces, Nigeria.
- George Borg, MBE, LLD, Chief Justice, Malta.
- Oscar Bedford Daly, MBE, Colonial Legal Service, Chief Justice, Bahamas.
- James Taylor Lawrence, Chief Justice, Aden.

=== Order of the Bath ===
==== Knight Grand Cross of the Order of the Bath (GCB) ====
Military Division

Army

- General Sir Walter Venning, KCB, CMG, CBE, MC, (5928), Colonel, The Duke of Cornwall's Light Infantry, Colonel Commandant, Army Catering Corps, Aide-de-Camp General to The King.

Royal Air Force

- Air Chief Marshal Sir Charles Frederick Algernon Portal, KCB, DSO, MC.

Civil Division

- Sir Horace Perkins Hamilton, KCB, Permanent Under-Secretary of State for Scotland.

==== Knight Commander of the Order of the Bath (KCB) ====
Military Division

Royal Navy

- Vice-Admiral Geoffrey Schomberg Arbuthnot, CB, DSO.
- Vice-Admiral Henry Ruthven Moore, CB, CVO, DSO.
- Vice-Admiral Alban Thomas Buckley Curteis, CB.
- Surgeon Vice-Admiral Sheldon Francis Dudley, CB, OBE, FRS, MD, BS, FRCP (Lon.), DPH, DTM, KHP.

Army

- Lieutenant-General Augustus Francis Andrew Nicol Thorne, CB, CMG, DSO, (13980), late Grenadier Guards.
- Major-General (honorary Lieutenant-General) Sir Bertram Norman Sergison-Brooke, KCVO, CB, CMG, DSO, (12773), late Grenadier Guards.
- General Arthur Brodie Haig, CB, MC, (191075), Indian Army.

Royal Air Force

- Air Marshal John Tremayne Babington, CB, CBE, DSO.
- Air Marshal John Stanley Travers Bradley, CBE.
- Acting Air Marshal Arthur Travers Harris, CB, OBE, AFC.

Civil Division

- Major-General Harry Reginald Walter Marriott Smith, CB, CBE, DSO, DL, Chairman, Territorial Army Association of the County of Dorset.
- Sir (James) Alan Noel Barlow, KBE, CB, Third Secretary, HM Treasury.

==== Companion of the Order of the Bath (CB) ====
Military Division

Royal Navy

- Rear Admiral Marshal Llewelyn Clarke, DSC.
- Rear Admiral Geoffrey John Audley Miles.
- Rear Admiral (serving as Commodore Second Class) Cloudesley Varyl Robinson (Retd.)
- Rear Admiral Richard Hugh Loraine Bevan, DSO, MVO, (Retd.)
- Rear Admiral Alfred Hugh Taylor, OBE, (Retd.)
- Engineer Rear Admiral Henry William Wildish, CBE.

Army

- Lieutenant-General Edward Puttick, DSO, Staff Corps, New Zealand Military Forces.
- Major-General (acting Lieutenant-General) Archibald Edward Nye, MC, (5851), late The Royal Warwickshire Regiment.
- Major-General (acting Lieutenant-General) John George des Reaux Swayne, CBE, (17966), late The Somerset Light Infantry (Prince Albert's).
- Major-General Austin Timaeus Miller, MC, (8923), late The Sherwood Foresters (Nottinghamshire and Derbyshire Regiment).
- Major-General Frederick Gordon Hyland, MC, (4087), late Royal Engineers.
- Major-General Donald Clewer (14233), late Army Dental Corps.
- Major-General Arthur Victor Trocke Wakely, DSO, MC, (3536), late Royal Engineers.
- Major-General Otto Marling Lund, DSO, (6783), late Royal Artillery.
- Major-General Daril Gerrard Watson, CBE, MC, (9758), late The Duke of Cornwall's Light Infantry.
- Major-General Robert Francis Brydges Naylor, CBE, DSO, MC, (19402), late Royal Corps of Signals.
- Major-General Robert Beverley Pargiter (273241), late Royal Artillery.
- Major-General Humfrey Myddelton Gale, CBE, MC, (21273), late Royal Army Service Corps.
- Major-General Christopher Geoffrey Woolner, MC, (5491), late Royal Engineers.
- Major-General Francis Henry Norman Davidson, DSO, MC, (20272), late Royal Artillery.
- Major-General Geoffrey Chicheley Kemp, MC, (4557), late Royal Artillery.
- Colonel (temporary Major-General) Horatio Pettus Mackintosh Berney-Ficklin, MC, (21164), late The Royal Norfolk Regiment.
- Major-General (acting Lieutenant-General) Wilmot Gordon Hilton Vickers, OBE, (150903), Indian Army.
- Major-General Archibald Campbell Munro, MD, KHP, Indian Medical Service.
- Major-General Ralph Bouverie Deedes, OBE, MC, (185407), Indian Army.
- Lieutenant-Colonel (temporary Brigadier) Francis Roger North, MC, ED, Australian Military Forces.

Royal Air Force

- Air Vice-Marshal John Oliver Andrews, DSO, MC.
- Air Vice-Marshal John Joseph Breen, OBE.
- Air Vice-Marshal Malcolm Henderson, CIE, DSO.
- Air Vice-Marshal Robert Henry Magnus Spencer Saundby, MC, DFC, AFC.
- Acting Air Vice-Marshal Douglas Colyer, DFC.
- Acting Air Vice-Marshal Albert Durston, AFC.
- Acting Air Vice-Marshal Ralph Squire Sorley, OBE, DSC, DFC.
- Air Commodore John Wakeling Baker, MC, DFC.
- Air Commodore William Forster Dickson, DSO, OBE, AFC.
- Acting Air Commodore John Whitworth-Jones.

Civil Division

- Honorary Colonel Sir George Fossett Roberts, OBE, TD, DL, Chairman, Territorial Army Association of the County of Cardigan.
- Honorary Colonel Robert Bruce, DSO, TD, DL, Chairman, Territorial Army Association of the County of Aberdeen.
- Colonel Eric Charles Malcolm Phillips, DSO, TD, DL, Chairman, Territorial Army Association of the County of Hertford.
- Harold Corti Emmerson, Under-Secretary, Ministry of Labour & National Service.
- H. J. Gough, MBE, DSc, PhD, MIMechE, FRS, Deputy Controller-General, Research & Development, Ministry of Supply.
- Edward Hale, Principal Assistant Secretary, HM Treasury.
- William Percival Mildred, OBE, Director-General of Civil Aviation, Air Ministry.
- John Innes, Director of Telecommunications, General Post Office; seconded to the Mines Department as Deputy Controller-General.
- David Milne, Secretary, Scottish Home Department.
- Edwin Lawrence Mitchell, CBE, Principal Assistant Secretary, Ministry of Agriculture & Fisheries.
- Arthur William Neville, Principal Assistant Secretary, Ministry of Health.
- George Wilfred Turner, Second Secretary, Ministry of Supply.
- John Roland Wade, Director of Establishments, War Office.

=== Order of Merit (OM) ===
- Augustus Edwin John, RA.
- Professor Edgar Douglas Adrian, MD, DSc, LLD, FRCP, FRS.

=== Order of the Star of India ===
==== Knight Commander of the Order of the Star of India (KCSI) ====
- Diwan Bahadur Sir Arcot Ramaswami Mudaliar, Member of the Governor-General's Executive Council.

==== Companion of the Order of the Star of India (CSI) ====
- Lieutenant-Colonel Gerald Thomas Fisher, CIE, Indian Political Service, Resident for Central India.
- Conrad Laurence Corfield, CIE, MC, Indian Political Service, Resident for the Punjab States.
- Panna Lall, CIE, Barrister-at-Law, Indian Civil Service, Adviser to His Excellency the Governor of the United Provinces.
- Major-General Geoffry Allen Percival Scoones, DSO, OBE, MC, Indian Army, lately Director of Military Operations, General Headquarters, India.

=== Order of Saint Michael and Saint George ===
==== Knight Grand Cross of the Order of St Michael and St George (GCMG) ====
- Sir Gerald Campbell, KCMG, LLD, DCL, lately Director-General of the British Information Services in the United States of America.
- Sir Frederick Phillips, KCMG, CB, Third Secretary, His Majesty's Treasury, and representative of the Department in the United States of America.
- Sir Arthur Charles Cosmo Parkinson, KCB, KCMG, OBE, lately Permanent Under-Secretary of State, Colonial Office.

==== Knight Commander of the Order of St Michael and St George (KCMG) ====
- Sir Henry Edward Barker, lately Ministry of War Transport representative, Middle East.
- Sir Guy Anstruther Knox Marshall, CMG, DSc, FRS, Director of the Imperial Institute of Entomology.
- Sir Frank Nelson, lately Economic Policy Adviser to the Minister of Economic Warfare.
- Arthur Nevil Rucker, CB, CBE, Secretary, Office of the Minister of State, Cairo.
- John Everard Stephenson, CMG, CVO, OBE, Assistant Under-Secretary of State (Acting Deputy Under-Secretary of State), Dominions Office.
- John Adams Hunter, CMG, Governor & Commander-in-Chief of the Colony of British Honduras.
- Major Sir Hubert Craddock Stevenson, CMG, OBE, MC, Governor & Commander-in-Chief of the Colony & Protectorate of Sierra Leone.
- David Victor Kelly, CMG, MC, His Majesty's Ambassador Extraordinary & Plenipotentiary (Designate) to the Argentine Republic.
- Francis Dudley Rugman, CMG, MC, Financial Secretary to the Sudan Government.
- Walter Alexander Smart, Oriental Counsellor at His Majesty's Embassy at Cairo.

==== Companion of the Order of St Michael and St George (CMG) ====
- Donald Breadalbane Blacklock, MD, DPH, DTM, Professor of Tropical Hygiene in the University of Liverpool and Liverpool School of Tropical Medicine.
- John Gammie, Deputy Representative of the Ministry of War Transport in New York.
- Kenneth George Grubb, Controller, Overseas Publicity, Ministry of Information.
- Henry Drummond Hancock, Under-Secretary, Ministry of Supply, acting as Secretary-General to the British Raw Materials Mission, Washington.
- Charles Roy Price, Assistant Secretary, Dominions Office, at present Deputy High Commissioner for the United Kingdom in the Union of South Africa.
- Alexander Llewellyn Read, MVO, ISO, Clerk of the Executive Council, State Under-Secretary, and Official Secretary to the Premier, State of South Australia.
- James Alexander Winter, KC, Chief Clerk and Registrar of the Supreme Court, and formerly a Member of the Commission of Government, Newfoundland.
- Harold Samuel Wootton, Town Clerk of the City of Melbourne, State of Victoria.
- Andrew Basil Acheson, Assistant Secretary, Colonial Office.
- Harold Francis Cartmel-Robinson, OBE, Colonial Administrative Service, Provincial Commissioner, Northern Rhodesia.
- Geoffrey Fletcher Clay, OBE, MC, Colonial Agricultural Service, Director of Agriculture, Uganda.
- Robert Harry Drayton, Colonial Legal Service, Chief Secretary, Ceylon.
- Henry Lovell Goldsworthy Gurney, Colonial Administrative Service, Chief Secretary to the Conference of East African Governors and Secretary to the High Commissioner for Transport, Kenya & Uganda.
- Albert Arthur Mangnall Isherwood, OBE, Colonial Education Service, Director of Education, Tanganyika Territory.
- Victor William Tighe McGusty, OBE, MB, BCh, Colonial Medical Service, Director of Medical Services and Secretary for Indian Affairs, Fiji, and Central Medical Authority in the Western Pacific.
- Alexander Francis Mahaffy, MD, DPH, Director of the Yellow Fever Research Institute, Uganda.
- Sydney Moody, OBE, Colonial Administrative Service, Colonial Secretary, Mauritius.
- John Valentine Wistar Shaw, Colonial Administrative Service, Colonial Secretary, Cyprus.
- Francis Edward Viney Smith, Colonial Agricultural Service, Marketing & Trade Commissioner, Jamaica.
- George Frederick Webster, Colonial Administrative Service, Provincial Commissioner, Tanganyika Territory.
- Acting Commander Wilfred Albert Dunderdale, MBE, Royal Naval Volunteer Reserve. For services to the Foreign Office.
- Alvary Douglas Frederick Gascoigne, His Majesty's Consul-General at Tangier.
- William Evelyn Houstoun-Boswall, MC, formerly Counsellor at His Majesty's Embassy at Tokyo.
- William Henry Bradshaw Mack, Head of the French Department of the Foreign Office.
- John Moncaster Ley Mitcheson, OBE, Commercial Counsellor at His Majesty's Legation at Stockholm.
- George Pearson Paton, CBE, His Majesty's Consul-General at Istanbul.
- Brigadier William Wyndham Torre Torr, DSO, MC, Military Attache at His Majesty's Embassy at Madrid.

=== Order of the Indian Empire ===
==== Knight Commander of the Order of the Indian Empire (KCIE) ====
- Hugh Meggison Hood, CSI, CIE, Indian Civil Service, Adviser to His Excellency the Governor of Madras.
- Lieutenant-General Edward Pellew Quinan, CB, DSO, OBE, Indian Army, General Officer Commanding, Tenth Army.
- Edmond Nicolas Blandy, CSI, CIE, Indian Civil Service, Chairman, Bengal Public Service Commission and lately Chief Secretary to the Government of Bengal.
- Major Raja Shrimant Malojirao Mudhojirao alias Nana Saheb Naik Nimbalkar, Raja of Phaltan.
- Gerald William Priestley, Indian Civil Service, Member, Board of Revenue, Madras.

==== Companion of the Order of the Indian Empire (CIE) ====
- Joseph Boyd Irwin, DSO, MC, Indian Civil Service, Secretary to the Governor of Bombay.
- John Ainslie Mackeown, Indian Civil Service, Joint Secretary to the Government of India in the Department of Supply.
- Percy Marsden, Indian Civil Service, Commissioner, Rawalpindi Division, Punjab.
- Geoffrey Charles Frescheville Ramsden, Indian Civil Service, Officiating Commissioner, Jubbulpore Division, Central Provinces and Berar.
- Cecil Gilbert William Cordon, ED, Agent and General Manager, Madras and Southern Mahratta Railway.
- Lieutenant-Colonel Philip Gaisford, Indian Political Service, Resident for Kolhapur & the Deccan States.
- Michael Henry Braddon Nethersole, DSO, Indian Civil Service, Commissioner, Rohilkhand Division, United Provinces.
- Brigadier Herbert Edwin Abrahall Morris, OBE, IAOC, Deputy Director of Ordnance Services, General Headquarters, India.
- Brigadier Cecil Vivian Staveley Jackson, CBE, British Service, Chief Engineer, Southern Army, India.
- Arnold Eustace Bion, Indian Police, Inspector-General of Police, Bihar.
- Eardley Edward Carnac Price, Indian Audit & Accounts Service, Financial Secretary to the Government of the North-West Frontier Province.
- Roualeyn Charles Rossiter Cumming, Indian Police, Inspector-General of Police and Joint Secretary in the Home Department, Government of Assam.
- Satyendra Mohan Dhar, Indian Civil Service, Secretary to the Government of Bihar in the Education, Development & Employment Departments.
- Arthur Frederick William Dixon, Indian Civil Service, Dewan of Cochin, lately Secretary to the Government of Madras in the Local Administration Department, Madras.
- Gilbert Alexander Murray Brown, OBE, Indian Service of Engineers, Chief Engineer and Secretary to the Government of the North-West Frontier Province in the Public Works Department.
- Captain Sardar Bahadur Dalpat Singh, OBI, IOM, Member of the Central Legislative Assembly, Rohtak District, Punjab.
- Colonel John Forbes Meiklejohn, Indian Army, Inspector of Physical Training, India.
- Captain Lancelot Sanderson, Royal Indian Navy, Naval Officer-in-Charge, Calcutta.
- Christopher Millward Harlow, Indian Forest Service, Chief Conservator of Forests, Central Provinces and Berar.
- Engineer Captain James Beggs, Royal Indian Navy, Director of Shipbuilding, Munitions Production Branch, Department of Supply, Government of India.
- Alfred Ernest Porter, Indian Civil Service, Additional Secretary to the Government of Bengal in the Home Department.
- Lieutenant-Colonel Abdul Harnid Shaikh, Indian Medical Service, Inspector-General of Prisons, United Provinces.
- Joshua Parlby, OBE, Military Accountant-General, Government of India.
- William Telford Hall, Indian Forest Service, Chief Conservator of Forests, United Provinces.
- John Bowstead, MC, Indian Civil Service, Additional Secretary to Government and Director of Civil Defence, Orissa.
- Lieutenant-Colonel George Arthur Falconer, His Britannic Majesty's Consul, Kerman, Persian Gulf Residency.
- Colonel Edward Aubrey Glennie, DSO, (late Royal Engineers), Director, Survey of India.
- Lieutenant-Colonel Brian Macmahon Mahon, DSO, MC, Indian Army (Retd.), lately Military Secretary to His Excellency the Viceroy.
- Prabhakar Narayan Chandavarkar, Imperial Customs Service, Collector of Customs, Bombay.
- Charles Samuel Mullan, Indian Civil Service, Commissioner of Income Tax, Bengal.
- Shridhar Balkrishna Vaidya, Barrister-at-Law, Collector and District Magistrate, Surat, Bombay.
- Arthur Reginald Augier, Senior Deputy Director-General, Posts & Telegraphs.
- Lieutenant-Colonel George Reid McRobert, Indian Medical Service, Professor of Medicine, Medical College, Superintendent and Physician, General Hospital, Madras.
- John Leslie Grant, Indian Service of Engineers, Superintending Engineer, Sind.
- Lieutenant-Colonel Edward McKenzie Taylor, MBE, PhD (Cantab.), DSc (Durban), FIC, Director, Irrigation Research Institute, Punjab.
- Walter Allen Jenkins, Indian Educational Service, Special Officer under the Director of Public Instruction, Bengal.
- Sardar Bahadur Nawab sir Asadullah Khan, Raisani, Kalat State, Baluchistan.
- Lionel Everard Napier, FRCP (London), Professor of Tropical Medicine and Director, School of Tropical Medicine, Calcutta, Bengal.

=== Royal Victorian Order ===
==== Knight Commander of the Royal Victorian Order (KCVO) ====
- Sir Rupert Beswicke Howorth, KCMG, CB.
- Sir Alfred Edward Webb-Johnson, CBE, DSO, TD, MB, ChB, FRCS.

==== Commander of the Royal Victorian Order (CVO) ====
- Thomas Chadwick, OBE.
- Colonel Charles Stafford Price-Davies, MC, (dated 14 February 1942).
- William Henry Harris, MA, DMus (Oxon), FRCO.
- Cedric Sydney Lane-Roberts, FRCS.

==== Member of the Royal Victorian Order, 4th class (MVO) ====
- The Reverend Maurice Frederic Foxell, MA.
- Charlotte Haskins, ARRC (dated 14 February 1942).
- George Edward Fenton King.
- Major William Alfred Morris (dated 9 May 1942).

==== Member of the Royal Victorian Order, 5th class (MVO) ====
- Lieutenant Michael Humble-Crofts (dated 9 May 1942).
- Theodore Jenkins.
- Ruth Maybell Webster.

=== Order of the British Empire ===
==== Knight Grand Cross of the Order of the British Empire (GBE) ====
Military Division

- Admiral Sir Charles James Colebrook Little, KCB.

Civil Division

- Arthur, Baron Riverdale, KBE, LLD. For services to the Empire Air Training Scheme.

==== Dame Commander of the Order of the British Empire (DBE) ====
Military Division

- Katharine Henrietta Jones, RRC, (206237), Matron-in-Chief, Queen Alexandra's Imperial Military Nursing Service.

==== Knight Commander of the Order of the British Empire (KBE) ====
Military Division

Royal Navy

- Vice-Admiral Francis Murray Austin, CB, (Retd.)
- Vice-Admiral John Augustine Edgell, CB, OBE, (Retd.)
- Vice-Admiral Francis Thomas Butler Tower, CB, OBE, (Retd.)

Army

- Major-General George Brian Ogilvie Taylor, CB, CBE, (3405), late Royal Engineers.

Royal Air Force

- Air Marshal Bertine Entwisle Sutton, CB, DSO, OBE, MC.
- Air Vice-Marshal Hazelton Robson Nicholl, CB, CBE.

Civil Division

- Alexander Cunnison, CB, JP, Permanent Secretary, Ministry of Pensions.
- Charles Galton Darwin, MC, ScD, LLD, FRS, Director, National Physical Laboratory, Department of Scientific & Industrial Research.
- George Selby Washington Epps, CB, CBE, Government Actuary.
- Reginald Herbert Hill, CB, Deputy Director-General, Ministry of War Transport.
- Warwick Lindsay Scott, DSC, Second Secretary, Ministry of Aircraft Production.
- Robert Rowland Appleby, CBE, a British subject resident in New York.
- Sir Jwala Prasad Srivastava, Member of the Legislative Assembly, Cawnpore, United Provinces.
- Jules Leclezio, CBE. For public services in Mauritius.

==== Commander of the Order of the British Empire (CBE) ====
Military Division

Royal Navy

- Engineer Rear-Admiral Frank Victor King.
- Captain Ralph Douglas Binney, (Retd.)
- Captain Roden Henry Victor Buxton, (Retd.)
- Captain Leonard Gallilan Garbett, (Retd.)
- Captain Ian Agnew Patteson Macintyre.
- Captain Robert Don Oliver, DSC.
- Captain John Noel Pelly, (Retd.)
- Captain Philip Ruck-Keene.
- Captain Percy Todd, DSO.
- Captain (Acting Commodore, Second Class) James Kenneth Brook, DSO, RD, Royal Naval Reserve.
- Engineer Captain Brian John Hamilton Wilkinson.
- Engineer Captain Arthur Cyril Weeks Hears, Royal Australian Navy.
- Captain (E) Denys Chester Ford.
- Surgeon Captain Henry St. Clair Colson, MB, BS, DPH.
- Paymaster Captain Bernard Carter, (Retd.)
- Paymaster Captain Walter Keir Campbell Grace.
- Temporary Paymaster Captain Arthur Purves Shaw.
- Colonel Commandant (Temporary Brigadier) Arthur Peel Dawson, OBE, ADC, Royal Marines.

Army

- Colonel Marcus James Henry Bruce (45571), late Royal Army Service Corps.
- Colonel (temporary Brigadier) John Owen Carpenter, MC, (1203), late The East Surrey Regiment.
- Lieutenant-Colonel (temporary Brigadier) Fitzroy Tozer Chapman, DSc, AMInstCE, MIEE, (108990), General List.
- Colonel (temporary Brigadier) Douglas Hendrie Currie, MC, DCM, Indian Army.
- Colonel Richard Brownlow Purey Cust, DSO, MC, (4134), late Royal Artillery.
- Colonel William Augustus Bampfylde Daniell, DSO, TD, Suffolk Home Guard.
- Lieutenant-Colonel (temporary Brigadier) John Conyers D'Arcy, MC, (10058), Royal Artillery.
- Lieutenant-Colonel (temporary Brigadier) Charles Anderson Lane Dunphie (18327), Royal Artillery.
- Colonel Robert Dunsmore, TD, London Home Guard.
- Colonel (temporary Major-General) Oliver Pearce Edgcumbe, MC, (12450), late Royal Corps of Signals.
- Colonel (temporary Brigadier) Edward Lionel Farley, MC, (1293), late Royal Engineers.
- Colonel (temporary Brigadier) Douglas Alexander Henry Graham, MC, (8265), late The Cameronians (Scottish Rifles).
- Lieutenant-Colonel & Ordnance Officer, 2nd Class (temporary Colonel & Ordnance Officer 1st Class) Gordon Paul Umfreville Hardy (5923), Royal Army Ordnance Corps.
- Colonel Alan Rupert Laurie, TD, MB, (34416), late Royal Army Medical Corps.
- Lieutenant-Colonel (temporary Brigadier) John Sydney Lethbridge, MC, (13389), Royal Engineers.
- Colonel Robert Godfrey Llewellyn, OBE, MC, TD, DL, London Home Guard.
- Colonel (temporary Brigadier) Charles Allison Murray (4635), late Royal Army Veterinary Corps.
- Colonel Ebenezer John Lecky Pike, MC, Sussex Home Guard.
- Lieutenant-Colonel (temporary Brigadier) Cecil Whitfield Raw, TD, (22742), Royal Artillery.
- Colonel John Laurence Short, OBE, (12786), late The King's Regiment (Liverpool).
- Colonel Oliver Sutton-Nelthorpe, DSO, MC, (41951), late The Rifle Brigade (Prince Consort's Own).
- Colonel (temporary Brigadier) Thomas Thelwall Waddington, MC, (49711), late The Queen's Own Royal West Kent Regiment.
- Colonel (acting Major-General) Frederick George Wrisberg (10125), late Royal Artillery.

Royal Air Force

- Air Vice-Marshal Ronald Graham, DSO, DSC, DFC.
- Acting Air Vice-Marshal Alan Lees, DSO, AFC.
- Acting Air Vice-Marshal Robert Dickinson Oxland, OBE.
- Acting Air Vice-Marshal Horace Ernest Philip Wigglesworth, DSC.
- Air Commodore Walter John Brice Curtis, OBE.
- Air Commodore Andrew Grant, MBE, MB, ChB, DPH.
- Air Commodore Bernard McEntegart.
- Air Commodore Philip Herbert Mackworth, DFC.
- Air Commodore Reginald Baynes Mansell, OBE.
- Air Commodore Arthur Penrose Martyn Sanders.
- Group Captain Herbert Ivor Trentham Beardsworth.
- Group Captain Arthur Garrity.
- Group Captain Herbert George Jones.
- Acting Group Captain Arthur Vere Harvey, Auxiliary Air Force.
- Acting Group Captain Hubert Leonard Patch.
- Group Captain Carny Scarlett Wiggins, Royal Australian Air Force.
- Group Captain George Stacey Hodson, AFC, Royal New Zealand Air Force.

Civil Division

- Eric Strickland Bertenshaw, Assistant Secretary, Board of Customs & Excise.
- Captain James Gordon Partridge Bisset, RD, Royal Naval Reserve (Retd.), Master, Merchant Navy.
- Leslie Stuart Brass, Assistant Legal Adviser, Home Office.
- Captain Theobald John Claude Purcell-Buret, DSC, Master, Merchant Navy.
- Edward Arnold Carmichael, MB, ChB, FRCP, Director of the Neurological Research Unit of the Medical Research Council at the National Hospital for Nervous Diseases.
- William George Hamar Chelmick, Accountant and Comptroller-General, Board of Inland Revenue.
- Robert Stanley Chipchase, MINA, Chairman and Managing Director, Tyne Dock Engineering Co. Ltd., South Shields.
- John Beresford Clark, Controller (Overseas Services), British Broadcasting Corporation.
- John Davidson, OBE, Regional Director, London Postal Region, General Post Office.
- John Alexander Dawson, Director of Works I, Air Ministry.
- Frederick William Delve, Deputy Inspector-in-Chief, National Fire Service.
- Charles Geoffrey Maurice des Graz, Assistant Director, Western Areas, Postal Censorship, Ministry of Information.
- Leslie Hall Downs, MIMechE, Chairman, Hull Reconstruction Panel. Managing Director, Rose, Downs & Thompson Ltd.
- Francis Robinson Gladstone Duckworth, MBE, Senior Chief Inspector, Board of Education.
- Captain Spencer Freeman, Principal Director, Regional and Emergency Services Organisation, Ministry of Aircraft Production.
- Will Fyffe, Scottish Actor and Comedian.
- Claude Dixon Gibb, Director-General, Weapon Production, Ministry of Supply.
- Stephen Frederick Gooden, ARA, RE, Engraver.
- William Graham, President of the National Farmers' Union and Chamber of Agriculture in Scotland.
- James Gray, MInstCE, Superintendent Engineer, Union Castle Mail Steamship Co. Ltd.
- Honorary Group Captain William Helmore, Royal Air Force (Retd.), PhD, MS, FCS, FRAeS, Technical Adviser, Ministry of Aircraft Production.
- Alan Semphill Hinshelwood, Chairman of the Fire Offices Committee.
- Brigadier-General Herbert Arthur Jones. For services as Chairman of a Committee on Royal Air Force Administration.
- Reginald Victor Jones, D.Phil, Assistant Director of Intelligence, Air Ministry.
- Percy William Jupp, OBE, FAI, Director of Lands and Accommodation, Ministry of Works and Buildings.
- John Vivian Kitto, Librarian of the House of Commons.
- Hector Leak, Assistant Secretary, Board of Trade.
- Charles George Maby, OBE, Chief Constable of Bristol.
- Thomas Jones Mackie, MD, MRCPE, DPH, FRSE, Professor of Bacteriology in the University of Edinburgh. For services to Civil Defence.
- Frederick Martin, Chairman of the Public Health Committee, Aberdeen County Council.
- John Primatt Redcliffe Maud, Deputy Secretary, Ministry of Food.
- Kenneth Tweedale Meaby, DL, Air Raid Precautions Controller, and County Clerk, Nottinghamshire.
- Commander Edward Robert Micklem, Royal Navy (Retd)., General Manager, Vickers-Armstrongs.
- Henry Morris, Secretary to the Cambridgeshire Education Committee.
- Francis James Mortimer, lately President of the Royal Photographic Society.
- George Henry Parker, Chairman of the National Joint Council for the Building Industry.
- Wyndham Parker, MC, MB, ChB, DPH, Medical Officer of Health for Worcestershire. For services to Civil Defence.
- Alexander Pickard, Town Clerk of Kingston-upon-Hull. For services to Civil Defence.
- Clifford Walter Radcliffe, Clerk to the Middlesex County Council. For services to Civil Defence.
- Alderman Edwin Scoby Oak-Rhind, Chairman of the Kent County Civil Defence Committee.
- Lawrence Richmond, OBE, Public Assistance Officer, Yorkshire, West Riding County Council.
- Leslie Roberts, General Manager, Manchester Ship Canal Company.
- Lieutenant-Colonel James Bertie Simpson, OBE, TD, MD, FRCP, DL. For public services in Sutherlandshire.
- Allan Stevenson, MINA, lately Deputy Director of Merchant Shipbuilding, Admiralty.
- Geoffrey Summers, DL. For public services in Flintshire.
- Harold Vincent Tewson, MC, Assistant General Secretary of the Trades Union Congress.
- Frank Douglas Turner, MB, MRCS, LRCP, Medical Superintendent, Royal Eastern Counties Institution for the Mentally Defective.
- George Campbell Vaughan, Chief Constable, West Riding Constabulary and Deputy Air Raid Precautions Controller.
- Major Aubrey Pattisson Wallman Wedd, OBE, JP, DL, Chairman of Civil Defence Committee of Essex County Council. Air Raid Precautions Controller for Essex.
- William Dale Wilkinson, DSO, MC, Assistant Secretary, Offices of the War Cabinet.
- Zwinglius Frank Willis, OBE, General Secretary, Young Men's Christian Association.
- James Ireland Craig, of the Egyptian Ministry of Finance.
- Arthur Noel Cumberbatch, MBE, Commercial Secretary at His Majesty's Legation at Tehran.
- George Lyall, His Majesty's Consul-General at San Jose.
- Alfred Clarence Norman, MD, MB, ChB, Director of the X-Ray Institute in Iraq, and Professor of Radiology, Royal College of Medicine, Bagdad.
- Joseph Pyke, His Majesty's Consul-General at Basel.
- Edward Campbell, a Member of the Melbourne City Council, State of Victoria, for many years.
- Leslie Jenner, President of the Young Men's Christian Association, State of Victoria. For public services.
- Raja Bahadur Raja Brij Narayan Rai, of Padrauna Estate, Gorakhpur District, United Provinces.
- Samuel Garthwaite Edgar, Indian Service of Engineers, Superintending Engineer and Public Works Minister, Government of Jodhpur, Rajputana.
- James Bell Henderson, General Manager of the Garden Reach Workshops of MacNeill & Co., Calcutta.
- John Humphrey, OBE, Broker, Sind.
- Diwan Bahadur Nilkanth Chintaman Limaye, District Government Pleader and Public Prosecutor, Sholapur, Bombay.
- Cecil Austyn Bartlett, Secretary-Manager, Clove Growers Association, Zanzibar.
- Gilbert Edwin Bodkin, Colonial Agricultural Service, Director of Agriculture and Principal, College of Agriculture, Mauritius.
- Henry Carr, OBE, ISO, DCL. For public services in Nigeria.
- The Reverend Harold Aldwyn Cox. For public services in the Nyasaland Protectorate.
- Farquhar Victor Macdonald, General Manager, Gold Coast Railways.
- Lionel McDowall Robison, Colonial Education Service, Director of Education, Ceylon.
- Hubert Edmund Walker, OBE, Deputy Director of Public Works, Nigeria.
- William Law Watson, MBE, AMInstCE, Head of the Engineering Contracts Branch, Crown Agents for the Colonies.

Honorary Commander

- Umar ibn Mohammed al Amin al Kanemi, Shehu of Bornu, Northern Provinces, Nigeria.

==== Officer of the Order of the British Empire (OBE) ====
Military Division

Royal Navy

- Temporary Paymaster Captain Alan Watson Laybourne.
- Commander Guy Runciman Barrow, (Retd).
- Commander Alexander Noel Campbell Bingley.
- Commander Thomas Marcus Brownrigg.
- Commander James Edmund Fenton.
- Commander Henry Keppel Gamier, (Retd).
- Commander John Henry Revel Homfray, (Retd).
- Commander Francis Bernard Lloyd.
- Commander Alfred William James Long, (Retd).
- Commander Ernest Robert Maycock, (Retd).
- Commander John Henry Ruck-Keene, DSC.
- Commander Anthony Henry Thorold.
- Acting Commander Geoffrey Niblett.
- Commander Eric Arthur Divers, RD, Royal Naval Reserve.
- Commander Trevor Lewis Owen, Royal Naval Reserve.
- Commander Reginald Vincent Rutley, RD, Royal Naval Reserve (Retd.)
- Acting Commander Charles Wilfred Cecil Pinckney, RD, Royal Naval Reserve.
- Commander John Lawrence, Royal Indian Navy.
- Engineer Commander Alfred Ernest Kemp, (Retd).
- Engineer Commander Robert Albert Perry, (Retd).
- Acting Engineer Commander Frank William Crabbe, (Retd).
- Temporary Engineer Commander James Steel Doran McGuffog, Royal Australian Naval Reserve (S).
- Commander (E) William Evelyn Cavendish Davy.
- Commander (E) John Oswald Hugh Gairdner.
- Commander (E) Otto Francis McMahon, Royal Australian Navy.
- Paymaster Commander (Acting Paymaster Captain) Herbert Reginald Henry Vaughan.
- Paymaster Commander Ronald Bailey.
- Paymaster Commander Harry Prevett.
- Surgeon Commander Robert Cyril May, MC, MRCS, LRCP.
- Acting Constructor Commander Henry Robert Mann, Royal Corps of Naval Constructors.
- Lieutenant-Colonel (Acting Colonel Commandant, Temporary Brigadier) Arthur Nicholl Williams, Royal Marines.
- Lieutenant-Commander Thomas Louis Alkin.
- Lieutenant-Commander Richard James Bailey.
- Lieutenant-Commander Richard George Wyndham Hare.
- Lieutenant-Commander Lillistone Powys Lane, (Retd).
- Lieutenant-Commander John Robert Mead, (Retd).
- Lieutenant-Commander James Francis Drake, RD, Royal Naval Reserve.
- Acting Temporary Lieutenant-Commander Samuel Rayer, DSC, Royal Naval Reserve.
- Acting Temporary Lieutenant-Commander Albert Henry Rendle, Royal Naval Volunteer Reserve.
- Lieutenant-Commander Raymond Palmer Middleton, Royal Australian Navy.
- Engineer Lieutenant-Commander (Acting Engineer Captain) Andrew Robert William Richardson, (Retd).
- The Reverend Alan Spender, MA, Chaplain.
- The Reverend Arthur Kenneth Mathews, MA, Temporary Chaplain, Royal Naval Volunteer Reserve.
- Temporary Captain (Acting Temporary Major) John Farquhar Maxfield, Royal Marines.

Army

- Lieutenant-Colonel Donald Richard Allen, MC, London Home Guard.
- Lieutenant-Colonel (temporary Colonel) Thomas Frank Arnott (45342), Royal Army Medical Corps.
- Lieutenant-Colonel Samuel Edgar Ashton, TD, (25751), The Royal Berkshire Regiment (Princess Charlotte of Wales's).
- Captain (Ordnance Mechanical Engineer 3rd Class) (temporary Major Ordnance Mechanical Engineer 2nd Class) Harold Atherton (131867), Royal Army Ordnance Corps.
- Major (temporary Lieutenant-Colonel) Colin Willoughby Baker, DSO, MC, (136060), The Leicestershire Regiment.
- Major (temporary Lieutenant-Colonel) Geoffrey William Beeforth, ED, Australian Military Forces.
- Major (temporary Lieutenant-Colonel) George Alexander Bond (24733), Royal Army Service Corps.
- Major (temporary Lieutenant-Colonel) Leslie Ernest Bourke (27894), Royal Artillery.
- Major (temporary Lieutenant-Colonel) (acting Brigadier) Geoffrey Kemp Bourne (23643), Royal Artillery.
- Major (temporary Lieutenant-Colonel) Arthur Edward Victor Brumell, MC, (25578), Royal Artillery.
- Lieutenant-Colonel Robert Chamberlin, Somerset Home Guard.
- Major (temporary Lieutenant-Colonel) Randolph Arthur Chell (95833), The Essex Regiment.
- Major Valentine William Bland Church, MC, (60695), Royal Artillery.
- Lieutenant-Colonel Harold Kenneth Cleary, London Home Guard.
- Lieutenant-Colonel John Victor Collins, ED, Ceylon Garrison Artillery.
- Major Vincent Morse Cooper (53594), Royal Artillery.
- Colonel Edward Boustead Cuthbertson, CMG, MVO, Hampshire Home Guard, (Appointment dated 12 May 1942, since deceased.)
- Major (temporary Lieutenant-Colonel) Charles James George Dalton (18839), Royal Artillery.
- Lieutenant-Colonel Frederick Leopold Faure Deneys, Cheshire Home Guard.
- Major (Brevet Lieutenant-Colonel) (acting Lieutenant-Colonel) Stephen Searle Hill-Dillon, DSO (4068), The Royal Ulster Rifles.
- Major (temporary Lieutenant-Colonel) Godfrey Maxwell Dyer, Indian Armoured Corps.
- Lieutenant-Colonel (Ordnance Officer 2nd Class) James Percy Earp, MC, (13809), Royal Army Ordnance Corps.
- Lieutenant-Colonel Walter Scott-Evans, Buckinghamshire Home Guard.
- Lieutenant-Colonel Charles Vernon Fitton, MC, North Riding Home Guard.
- Lieutenant-Colonel Jack Rose Compton Gannon, MVO, (3790), Retd. pay, late Indian Army.
- Major (temporary Lieutenant-Colonel) Arthur William Sumner Gibson (3540), Royal Engineers.
- Lieutenant-Colonel Edgar Harrison, Kent Home Guard.
- Colonel (acting Brigadier) Robert Alexander Hepple, MC, MB, (22839), late Royal Army Medical Corps.
- Major (temporary Lieutenant-Colonel) Norman Hugh Huttenbach (4599), Royal Artillery.
- Major (temporary Lieutenant-Colonel) Percy Jennings, MC, (9742), Royal Corps of Signals.
- Major Edwin Jones (1150), Royal Artillery.
- Major (temporary Lieutenant-Colonel) Frank Eric Burr Jones (2855), Royal Corps of Signals.
- Lieutenant-Colonel Khem Singh, Bikaner Ganga Risala, Indian States Forces.
- Major (temporary Lieutenant-Colonel) Ian Leo William Douglas Laurie (18587), Royal Tank Regiment, Royal Armoured Corps.
- Lieutenant (Quarter-Master) (temporary Major) Richard George Leggett, DCM, Retd. pay, late Royal Army Medical Corps.
- Lieutenant-Colonel (temporary Colonel) Robert Stedman Lewis, Indian Army Ordnance Corps.
- Major (Staff Paymaster 2nd Class) George Lidstone (22310), Royal Army Pay Corps.
- Major Stephen Alfred Lowman, Royal Indian Army Service Corps.
- Major & Paymaster (Staff Paymaster 2nd Class) (temporary Lieutenant-Colonel) (Staff Paymaster 1st Class) Herbert Henry Malpass (700), Royal Army Pay Corps.
- Captain (Brevet Major) Alexander Hall-Maxwell (9332), The Royal Scots (The Royal Regiment).
- Major (temporary Lieutenant-Colonel) Edgar Ravenswood McKillop, New Zealand Military Forces.
- Major (temporary Lieutenant-Colonel) Cecil George Millett (25112), The Duke of Cornwall's Light Infantry.
- Lieutenant (temporary Major) Albert Mitchell, Australian Military Forces.
- Lieutenant-Colonel Alan Moncrieff, MC, AMInstCE, West Riding Home Guard.
- Major George Stanley Newman, 17th Dogra Regiment, Indian Army.
- Captain (temporary Major) Francis George Clare Noakes (4249), 16th/5th Lancers, Royal Armoured Corps.
- Lieutenant-Colonel James Henry Nock, Fifeshire Home Guard.
- Lieutenant-Colonel Archibald Besley Pasmore, TD, (19764), The Queen's Royal Regiment (West Surrey).
- Major Neville Ernest Valentine Patterson (10877), Royal Engineers.
- Captain Hubert Ronald Phipps, MC, (11023), The Wiltshire Regiment (Duke of Edinburgh's).
- Lieutenant-Colonel (temporary Colonel) Albert William Homer Rea, AMIMechE, Indian Army Ordnance Corps.
- Major (temporary Lieutenant-Colonel) Francis Smith Reid, Royal Artillery.
- Major (Brevet Lieutenant-Colonel) (temporary Lieutenant-Colonel) Thomas Reilly, MC, (11642), Royal Artillery.
- Major (temporary Lieutenant-Colonel) John Ridgway Reynolds, 15th Punjab Regiment, Indian Army.
- Major (temporary Lieutenant-Colonel) Thomas Dunnette Roberts (94618), Royal Army Ordnance Corps.
- Captain (temporary Major) David Winter Roy, Reserve of Officers, attached Trans-Jordan Frontier Force.
- Major & Staff Paymaster 2nd Class (temporary Lieutenant-Colonel & Staff Paymaster 1st Class) Robert Horton Sayers, MC, (34442), Royal Army Pay Corps.
- Major (temporary Lieutenant-Colonel) Sydney Oliver Screen (107369), Royal Engineers.
- Major Brevet Lieutenant-Colonel (Quartermaster) Herbert James Sheppard, DCM, 6th Rajputana Rifles, Indian Army.
- Captain (temporary Major) Thomas Patrick Spens, MC, (101826), Special List.
- Major (temporary Lieutenant-Colonel) (local Colonel) Eustace Dupuis Henchman Stocker, MC, (28539), Extra Regimentally Employed List.
- Major (temporary Lieutenant-Colonel) Joseph Terreni (146741), Royal Malta Artillery.
- Major (temporary Lieutenant-Colonel) (Ordnance Mechanical Engineer 1st Class) Leslie Norman Tyler, BSc (Engineer), AMIMechE, (38480), Royal Army Ordnance Corps.
- Lieutenant-Colonel Alexander Frederick Farquhar Young (21740), The Queen's Royal Regiment (West Surrey).

Royal Air Force

- Acting Group Captain Lionel Richard Stanford Freestone.
- Wing Commander Frank George Brockman, MBE, (03162), Reserve of Air Force Officers.
- Wing Commander Joe Davison (11078).
- Wing Commander William George Hamilton Ewing (24052).
- Wing Commander Charles Joseph Philip Flood (33085).
- Wing Commander (now Acting Group Captain) Ernest Charles Kidd, AFC, AFM, (05237)
- Wing Commander (now Group Captain) Henry Edward Nowell (16160).
- Wing Commander Kenneth John McIntyre (25039).
- Wing Commander Hugh Whittall Marlow, AFC, (29189).
- Wing Commander Walter Philip George Pretty (26163).
- Wing Commander Laurence John Stickley, DFC, (34252), Reserve of Air Force Officers.
- Wing Commander Francis Claude Sturgiss (26095).
- Wing Commander John Andrews Tester (29151).
- Wing Commander Michael Watson (28061).
- Wing Commander (now Acting Group Captain) John Gerard Willsley Weston (26097).
- Wing Commander (now Acting Group Captain) Charles Henry Chapman Woollven, MC, (03111).
- Acting Wing Commander William John Stephen Barnard, MBE, (35100).
- Acting Wing Commander Arthur Harold Beach (03133), Royal Air Force Volunteer Reserve.
- Acting Wing Commander Alfred Clifton (35060).
- Acting Wing Commander Frederick Fulton Fulton (74014), Royal Air Force Volunteer Reserve.
- Acting Wing Commander Noel Thomas Goodwin (19020), Royal Air Force Volunteer Reserve.
- Acting Wing Commander William Eric Warr Grieve (22115).
- Acting Wing Commander Thomas Arthur Scarff (35245).
- Squadron Leader Bernard Gould Carfoot (31175).
- Squadron Leader Harold Hugh Laurie (35063).
- Acting Squadron Leader William Herbert Bigg (70063), Reserve of Air Force Officers.
- Acting Squadron Leader Hubert Dinwoodie, MC, (72819), Royal Air Force Volunteer Reserve.
- Acting Squadron Leader Harry Zaida Foreman (36100).
- Acting Squadron Leader John Gallie (35341).
- Acting Squadron Leader Richard Francis Gore Lea (90116), Auxiliary Air Force Reserve of Officers.
- Acting Squadron Leader Tom Urquhart Pollitt (35278).
- Wing Commander John Raeburn Balmer, Royal Australian Air Force.
- Acting Wing Commander Charles John Newhill Leleu, Royal Australian Air Force.

Civil Division

- Captain Albert Andrew Andrews, Secretary of the Soldiers', Sailors' and Airmen's Families Association.
- Benjamin Edward Astbury, General Secretary, Charity Organisation Society. For services to Civil Defence.
- Ernest Astbury, MIMechE, Chief Engineer and Chief Executive Officer of the Liverpool Gas Company. For services to Civil Defence.
- Stanley Critchley Auty, Town Clerk and Air Raid Precautions Controller, Bromley.
- Harold Balme, MD, FRCS, LRCP, DPH, Medical Superintendent, Pinder Fields Emergency Hospital, Wakefield.
- Captain Henry Barnett, Master, Merchant Navy.
- Madge Frederic Bell, Honorary County Secretary for the North & West Ridings of Yorkshire, Soldiers', Sailors' & Airmen's Families Association.
- Percy Gibson Bennell, Assistant Controller, Post Offices Stores Department.
- Clement Berry, Chief Merchant Ship Repair Licensing Officer, West of Scotland, Admiralty.
- John Herman Binder, Superintending Examiner, Patent Office, Board of Trade.
- George Binns, Chief Sanitary Inspector and Chief Billeting Officer, Liverpool.
- Alexander Black, Chief Engineer, Merchant Navy.
- Leonard Christopher Blackstone, MB, BS, MRCS, LRCP, Surgeon, Merchant Navy.
- Councillor Colin George Blanchard, Mayor of Deptford. For services to Civil Defence.
- Percy Pickersgill Booth, Chief Regional Fire Officer, No. 2 (North Eastern) Region, National Fire Service.
- Kate Louisa Borne, Matron, Papworth Village Settlement.
- Edward George Bowen, Senior Scientific Officer, Ministry of Aircraft Production.
- Charles George Box, Chief Constable and Air Raid Precautions Controller, Great Yarmouth.
- Harold Edward Brooke-Bradley, Deputy County Surveyor, Worcestershire County Council. For services to Civil Defence.
- John Hector Brebner, MBE, Director, News Division, Ministry of Information.
- Alfred John Bridle, Fire Force Commander, No. 23 (Worcester) Area, National Fire Service.
- Gideon John Brown, Deputy Director, Tank Supply, Ministry of Supply.
- Rupert Pollard Browne, Secretary of the Radio Manufacturers' Association.
- Captain William Orr Burns, Master, Merchant Navy.
- William Arthur Butterfield, Chief Petroleum Engineer, Petroleum Department.
- Stephen Butterworth, MSc, Principal Scientific Officer, Admiralty.
- Annie Isabella Cameron, MA, PhD, DLitt, (Mrs. G. B. Dunlop), Member of the Council of the Scottish History Association.
- Captain Dunslay Harwood Casson, RD, Royal Naval Reserve, (retd.), Master, Merchant Navy.
- Sydney Richardson Cauthery, Director of Production Liaison for Engines & Aircraft Equipment, Ministry of Aircraft Production.
- Richard Clegg, Air Raid Precautions Controller and Town Clerk, Chesterfield Borough.
- Ernest John Cook, Works Manager, London Fire Force Headquarters Workshops.
- Frank Cook, Sub-District Manager in the Road Transport Organisation of the Ministry of War Transport, Hull.
- Hannah Frances Mary Court, Accountant, Offices of the House of Lords.
- Cicely Mary, Countess of Courtown, County Organiser for Buckinghamshire, Women's Voluntary Services for Civil Defence.
- Captain Charles Henry Cranch, Master, Merchant Navy.
- Frank Henry Crosier, Deputy General Manager, Navy, Army and Air Force Institutes.
- Herbert Crowther, JP, Assistant Divisional Food Officer, Ministry of Food.
- Francis Dann, Fire Force Commander, No. 27 (Manchester) Area, National Fire Service.
- James Taylor Davidson, Assistant Fire Force Commander, Western No. 1 Area, Scotland, National Fire Service.
- Captain Lachlan Dewar, Master, Merchant Navy.
- James Brownlie Dick, Chief Engineer, Merchant Navy.
- Arthur Hughes Dodd, Engineering Inspector, Grade I, Ministry of War Transport.
- Gerald Dowse, MA, Headmaster, Cowley School for Boys, St. Helens.
- Henry John Dryer, Secretary, Scottish Federation of Grocers' & Provision Merchants' Associations.
- Commander (E) Peter Du Cane, Royal Navy (Retd)., MINA, MIMechE, Managing Director, Messrs. Vosper Ltd.
- Alderman Edward George Eddy, MBE, JP. For public services in Kidderminster.
- James Ellery, Chief Engineer, Merchant Navy.
- Dorothy Mary Elliott, Chief Woman Officer of the National Union of General and Municipal Workers. Member of the Women's Consultative Committee, Ministry of Labour & National Service.
- Herbert Millson Enderby, City Surveyor, Canterbury. For services to Civil Defence.
- William Fairley, MBE, Secretary, Board of Control.
- John Falconer, Chief Engineer, Merchant Navy.
- John Drummond Farmer, Director, Messrs. J. & E. Hall, Dartford, Kent.
- Edwin Field, Principal, Home Office.
- Sidney Fitch, FSI, FAI, Chief Land Commissioner, Ministry of Agriculture & Fisheries.
- Captain Harry Fuller, Master, Merchant Navy.
- Emilie Montgomery Gardner, District Officer, Assistance Board.
- Maud Gates, Assistant Divisional Food Officer (Wartime Meals), North Western Division, Ministry of Food.
- Francis Henry Gibbons, MIMechE, MInstCE, Borough Engineer and Deputy Air Raid Precautions Controller, Dudley.
- Captain Herbert Joseph Giles, RD, Royal Naval Reserve (Retd.), Master, Merchant Navy.
- Captain George Gillanders, Master, Merchant Navy.
- William Santon Gilmour, MB, ChB, First Aid Commandant, Leeds Casualty Service.
- Leslie Ward Goddard, Senior Air Raid Precautions Operations and Training Officer, Western District of Scotland.
- Victor Andrew Goddard, Chief Instructions Officer, Ministry of Labour & National Service.
- Captain Henry Robert Gordon, Secretary, Ashridge Emergency Hospital.
- Durban Haigh, Chief Executive Officer, War Risk Insurance Office, Ministry of War Transport.
- Joseph Hardy, Chief Engineer, Merchant Navy.
- Arthur Clement Hamilton, MBE, Assistant Director of Contracts, Air Ministry.
- Alderman Edward Harris, Chairman of the West Glamorgan Advisory Committee, Assistance Board.
- Captain Ernest Hart, Master, Merchant Navy.
- Thomas Hartland, Chief Accountant, War Office.
- Leslie William Hayes, Head of Overseas and Engineering Information Department, British Broadcasting Corporation.
- Captain William Hill, Master, Merchant Navy.
- Gladys Verena Louisa Hillyers, Matron, St. Thomas' Hospital. For services to Civil Defence.
- Alexander Beatson Howie, Chief Engineer, Merchant Navy.
- William Hughes, Air Raid Precautions Controller, Dundee.
- Major Selwyn Wollaston Humphery, TD, JP, Mayor of Lowestoft and Air Raid Precautions Sub-Controller.
- Cecil Joseph Hurst, Member of the Midland Regional Transport Committee, Birmingham.
- Robert Illingworth, Engineer and General Manager, Poplar Borough Council Electricity Undertaking. For services to Civil Defence.
- Major Thomas Jackson, Chairman, War Work Committee of the Church Army.
- Doris James, County Director for Middlesex, War Organisation of the British Red Cross Society and Order of St. John.
- Dorothy Foster Jeffery, Regional Administrator, North West Region, Women's Voluntary Services for Civil Defence.
- Richard Henry Bishop Jesse, Executive Officer, East Sussex War Agricultural Executive Committee.
- David Murray John, Town Clerk and Air Raid Precautions Controller, Swindon.
- William Johnston, Chief Engineer, Merchant Navy.
- Edward Charles Henry Jones, MBE, Assistant Secretary, National Savings Committee.
- Captain Edward John Jones, lately Master, Merchant Navy.
- Captain George Brown Kelly, Master, Merchant Navy.
- Clive Hughes Kilmister, Chief Engineer, Coastal Command, Air Ministry.
- Arthur Richard Knowles, Secretary, Sheffield Chambers of Commerce.
- Vernon Lawrence, Air Raid Precautions Controller, Monmouthshire.
- David Laws, Staff Controller, London Postal Region, General Post Office.
- William Thomas Cangley Lett, Higher Collector, Belfast Collection, Board of Customs & Excise.
- William Charles Letts, MBE, Principal, Ministry of Pensions.
- Stanley Eli Lovatt, Assistant Controller, HM Stationery Office.
- Major Daniel McBride, TD, JP, Chairman of the Dumbarton and Alexandria Local Employment Committee. Sheriff Clerk for Dunbartonshire.
- Colin MacDonald, Divisional Land Officer, Department of Agriculture for Scotland.
- Ernest Kenneth Macdonald, MD, BS, MRCS, LRCP, DPH, Medical Officer of Health, Leicester. For services to Civil Defence.
- George Donald Alastair MacDougall, Chief Assistant, Statistical Branch, Prime Minister's Office.
- Captain Harold Colquhoun Marris, Air Raid Precautions Controller and County Clerk, Holland (Lincolnshire).
- Major Alec Bryan Matthews, DSO, MC, General Works Manager, New Crown Forgings Ltd.
- William Thomas Matthison, lately Chief Examiner, Estate Duty Office, Board of Inland Revenue.
- Henry Maw, JP, Secretary and Treasurer of the Edinburgh Royal Infirmary. For services to Civil Defence.
- Captain Alexander Graham Melville, Master, Merchant Navy.
- Captain John William Mills, Senior Marine Superintendent, Turnbull, Scott & Co.
- Charles Johns Mole, MVO, MBE, FRIBA, Assistant Director of Works, Ministry of Works & Buildings.
- Alexander Monro, FRCVS, Chief Veterinary Officer, Ministry of Agriculture, Northern Ireland.
- Herbert William Morgan, Docks Manager, Swansea.
- Gwladys Perrie Hopkin-Morris, LittD, Chairman of the South Wales Welfare Advisory Committee.
- Captain James Postgate Morris, Trinity House Pilot.
- Captain Daniel Morrison, Master, Merchant Navy.
- Captain Edgar John Myles, Master, Merchant Navy.
- Andrew Naesmith, JP, General Secretary of the Amalgamated Weavers' Association.
- Hilda May Nichols, Assistant Controller, Money Order Department, General Post Office.
- Alfred Nisbet, Chief Engineer, Merchant Navy.
- Frank Noble, Chief Accountant, Grants Section, Ministry of Home Security.
- John Lankester Parker, Chief Test Pilot, Messrs. Short Brothers.
- Adam Valentine Parlby, Superintendent, Royal Ammunition Factories, Woolwich.
- Robert Paterson, Chief Engineer, Merchant Navy.
- Captain Herbert Leonard Payne, RD, Royal Naval Reserve (Retd.), Master, Merchant Navy.
- Ernest Victor Pollard, Chief Engineer, Merchant Navy.
- D'Arcy Patrick Reilly, Principal, Ministry of Economic Warfare.
- Wilfred Eric Rice, Chairman of the Brixton Local Employment Committee.
- Hugh Bailie Robinson, Actuary, Belfast Savings Bank.
- William Henry Robinson, Chief Engineer, Merchant Navy.
- Major Vivian Barry Rogers, DSO, MC, JP, DL, Staff Officer to the Commandant-in-Chief, Metropolitan Police Special Constabulary.
- Ernest William Russell, Assistant Chief Inspector, Armaments Inspection Department, Ministry of Supply.
- Captain Henry Sadler, MC, Air Raid Precautions Officer, West Sussex.
- Robert Lindsay Scarlett, Chairman of the Scottish Horticultural Advisory Committee and of the Scottish Potato Registration Committee.
- George Arthur Scoley, Assistant Secretary, Office of the Commissioner of Metropolitan Police.
- Robert James Shand, Chief Engineer, Merchant Navy.
- David Shaw, Chief Engineer, Merchant Navy.
- Captain Norman Shotton, Master, Merchant Navy.
- Captain Malin Sorsbie, Manager in West Africa, British Overseas Airways Corporation.
- Katherine Milne Stirling, Chairman, Middlesex District Man-Power Board, Ministry of Labour & National Service.
- George Irvine Strath, Chief Constable, Banffshire.
- Captain Robert Strutt, Master, Merchant Navy.
- Henry John Swift, General Manager (Aero Production), Rolls-Royce Ltd.
- Captain Albert Ernest Thomas, Master, Merchant Navy.
- Alexander Thomson, Chief Engineer, Merchant Navy.
- Esther Margaret Thornton, Director, Prisoners of War Department, War Organisation of the British Red Cross Society & Order of St. John.
- Ralph Windsor Thorpe, ARIBA, Housing Inspector, No. 5 London Region, Ministry of Health.
- Captain William Loftus Todd, Master, Merchant Navy.
- Jack Birchall Twist, Chief Engineer, Merchant Navy.
- William George Vincent Vaughan, Director, General Production Division, Ministry of Information.
- William Robert Vaughan, Secretary, Waifs and Strays Society. For services to Civil Defence.
- Captain John Edwin Wade, Master, Merchant Navy.
- Claude Humphrey Meredith Waldock, Temporary Principal, Admiralty.
- James Wallace, Town Clerk of Widnes. For services to Civil Defence.
- Philip James Watkin, MC, MRCS, LRCP, Medical Superintendent, London County Council Hospital, Lambeth. For services to Civil Defence.
- John Rogers Watkins, Chairman of William Watkins Ltd., Thames Tug Owners.
- Charles Francis White, MD, ChB, DPH, Medical Officer of Health, City of London. For services to Civil Defence.
- Dick Goldsmith White, Assistant Director, War Office.
- Arnold Frederic Wilkins, MSc, Principal Scientific Officer, Ministry of Aircraft Production.
- Harry Willshaw, Chairman, Birmingham Reconstruction Panel. Works Engineer, Dunlop Rubber Company.
- Flight Lieutenant Lambert Eardley-Wilmot, Royal Air Force (Retd.), Regional Officer, Grade I, Ministry of Home Security.
- George Hamilton Bracher Wilson, MC, AFC, JP, Chairman, Nottingham War Savings Campaign Committee.
- Captain Leonard Gordon Wiseman, Master, Merchant Navy.
- Henry Wooldridge, Senior Scientific Officer, Department of Scientific & Industrial Research.
- Dudley George Bourn, Traffic Manager of the Iraq State Railways.
- Alexander Cruickshank, MD, BCh, Senior Medical Inspector, Equatoria Province, Sudan.
- Clarence Norbury Ezard, His Majesty's Consul at Beira.
- Ronald Ferguson, General Manager of the Egyptian State Broadcasting Company.
- John Philip Gordon Finch, His Majesty's Consul at Mosul.
- Laurence Brouncker Southby Larkins, formerly British Commercial Agent at Batavia.
- Leonard Haines Leach, Acting British Consul-General at New York.
- Robert Hugh Kirk Marett, Press Attache at His Majesty's Legation at Mexico City.
- Captain (Retd.) John Kindersley Maurice, District Commissioner, Sudan Political Service.
- William Alexander Troup, Headmaster Scottish School for Boys, Alexandria.
- Tom Stanley Denson Walley, a British subject resident in Buenos Aires.
- George James Armstrong, MBE, Acting Financial Secretary, Swaziland.
- Major Hedley William Clemow, Assistant Commissioner, Criminal Investigation Department, British South Africa Police.
- Robert William Dobson. For social welfare services in the City of Geelong, State of Victoria.
- Thomas Gilbert Henderson, MRCVS, Principal Veterinary Officer, Basutoland.
- Greta Lewis. For social welfare services in the State of South Australia.
- Andrew Paton Martin, MB, ChB, DTM&H, DPH, Medical Director and Chief Health Officer, Southern Rhodesia, Director of Medical Services for the Defence and Air Force in the Colony.
- Sidney Heneage Coates Palgrave, lately Auditor General, Southern Rhodesia.
- Robert Charles Thear, Mayor of the City of Geelong, State of Victoria.
- Hermann Albertus Voss, London Manager of the British Phosphate Commissioners.
- Lilian Ethel Thomas, Deputy Directress of Public Instruction, Punjab.
- Felix Ash, Director of Telegraph Stores & Workshops, Alipore, Calcutta.
- Baini Prashad, DSc, FRSE, FLS, FZS, Director, Zoological Survey of India.
- Major Reginald Charles George Chapman, Royal Engineers, Deputy Master, Security Printing, India.
- Major James Edward Corbett, Deputy Military Vice-President, Soldiers' Boards, Meerut, United Provinces.
- Major Frederick Tucker Deatker, Indian Medical Department (Retd.), District Superintendent, No. 3 District, St. John Ambulance Brigade Overseas, Bombay.
- Arthur Graham Francis Farquhar, Indian Civil Service, Deputy Commissioner, Nagpur, Central Provinces and Berar.
- Donald William Gollan, Deputy Adviser of Factories, ARP, Delhi, and lately Superintending Engineer, Public Works Department, Madras.
- Cardwell Sinclair Gunning, Indian Civil Service, Deputy Commissioner, Lakhimpur District, Assam.
- Khan Bahadur Syed Hamid Husain Khan, MBE, Rais and Honorary Magistrate, Lucknow, United Provinces.
- Michael Arthur Frederick Hirtzel, Member of the Legislative Assembly, Joint Secretary, Calcutta War Committee, and Calcutta Defence Loans Committee, Bengal.
- Khan Bahadur Sayid Ijaz Ali, MBE, Minister, Khairpur State.
- Hugh Dallas Latham, Indian Police, Special Air Raid Precautions Officer, Madras.
- Angus Alexander Macdonald, Indian Civil Service, Deputy Secretary to Government of the Punjab in the Home Department.
- Harry Joel Mulleneux, Chief Electrical Engineer, Great Indian Peninsula Railway, Bombay.
- Lieutenant-Colonel Howard Ferguson Murland, Coffee Planter, Coorg.
- Syed Abu Talib Naqvi, Indian Civil Service, Magistrate and Collector, Aligarh, United Provinces.
- Frederick George Percival, PhD, General Superintendent of Mines, Tata Iron & Steel Co. Ltd., Jamshedpur, Bihar.
- Edwin Terrey Prideaux, Indian Civil Service, District Magistrate, Bhagalpur, Bihar.
- Muhammad Rahmatullah, Nawab Rahmat Yar Jung Bahadur, Commissioner of Police, Hyderabad City & Suburbs, His Exalted Highness the Nizam's Government, Hyderabad (Deccan).
- Ranjit Singh, Senior Director, R. G. Cotton Mills Ltd, Lucknow.
- Mulk Raj Sachdev, Indian Civil Service, Deputy Secretary to the Government of India in the Supply Department and lately Additional Deputy Secretary to the Government of the Punjab in the Home Department.
- Harold Forbes Scroggie, Indian Police, Superintendent of Police, Hazara District, North-West Frontier Province.
- Probha Nath Singh Roy, Joint Secretary, Calcutta War Committee, and Calcutta Defence Loans Committee, Bengal.
- Archibald Hyndman Stein, Indian Forest Service, Divisional Forest Officer, Hoshangabad, Central Provinces & Berar.
- Captain Andrew Charles Stewart, Indian Political Service, Secretary to the Political Resident in the Persian Gulf.
- Paul Burgman Wilkins, MC, DFC, Indian Police, District Superintendent of Police, Poona, Bombay.
- Raymond Wilmot, MC, ED, Director of Leather Manufactures, Directorate-General of Supply, Department of Supply, Government of India.
- Arthur Henry Wilson, Field Controller of Military Accounts in Iraq.
- Malcolm Palliser Barrow. For public services in Nyasaland.
- Verey Alfred Beckley, MC, Colonial Agricultural Service, Senior Agricultural Chemist, Kenya.
- Hablot Robert Edgar Browne, Colonial Administrative Service, Assistant Colonial Secretary, Barbados.
- Andrew Benjamin Cohen, Colonial Administrative Service, Assistant to the Lieutenant-Governor, Malta.
- Joseph Charles Degiorgio. For public services in Malta.
- Louis Farrugia. For public services in Malta.
- Horatio Harvey Field. For public services in Northern Rhodesia.
- James Mervyn Fonseka, Legal Draftsman, Ceylon.
- Robert Spence Foster, Colonial Education Service, Director of Education, Zanzibar.
- Henry Joseph O'Donnell Burke-Gaffney, MD, BCh, Colonial Medical Service, Senior Pathologist, Tanganyika Territory.
- Kenneth Legat Hunter, Colonial Administrative Service, Senior District Commissioner, Kenya.
- Julius Jacobs, Colonial Administrative Service, Assistant Secretary, Palestine.
- Robert Irwin Kirkland, Workshops Superintendent, Kenya and Uganda Railways and Harbours Administration.
- James William Dunbar Locker, MBE, Colonial Administrative Service, Assistant to the Lieutenant-Governor, Malta.
- Arnold Burnett Mathews, Colonial Administrative Service, Commissioner of Division, Sierra Leone.
- Muljibhai Motibhai Patel. For public services in Uganda.
- Edward Charles Phillips. For public services in the Tanganyika Territory.
- George Eustace Poulia. For public services in Cyprus.
- Emmanuel Charles Quist. For public services in the Gold Coast.
- Frederic Gardiner Rose, MBE, MD, Medical Superintendent, Leprosy Hospital, British Guiana.
- Cecil Bernard Symes, Medical Entomologist, Kenya.
- Roland Wingrave Tench. For public services in Malta.
- Arthur Frederick Thelwejl, Secretary, Jamaica Agricultural Society.
- John Nicholas Elpidoforas Zarpas. For public services in Nigeria.

Honorary Officer

- Haj Shan Abdul-Hadi, Mamour Awqaf, Nablus, Palestine.

==== Member of the Order of the British Empire (MBE) ====
Military Division

Royal Navy

- Paymaster Lieutenant-Commander Neville James Cunningham, Royal Australian Naval Reserve.
- Acting Temporary Lieutenant-Commander Walter Hubert Lucas, Royal Naval Reserve.
- Acting Temporary Paymaster LieutenantCommander Charles Ingram Poole, Royal Naval Volunteer Reserve.
- Major (Quartermaster) Alfred James Bryant, Royal Marines (Retd.)
- Lieutenant James Sidney Cleary, (Retd).
- Lieutenant George Herbert Neave, (Retd).
- Lieutenant Samuel Richard Williams.
- Lieutenant Kenneth Arnold Vasey, Royal Naval Reserve.
- Temporary Lieutenant John William Evenden, Royal Naval Reserve.
- Temporary Lieutenant Guy Thornton Quine, Royal Naval Reserve.
- Temporary Lieutenant Hector Brownlie Campbell, Royal Naval Volunteer Reserve.
- Temporary Lieutenant Charles Gordon Victor Davies, Royal Naval Volunteer Reserve.
- Temporary Lieutenant Peter Markham Scott, Royal Naval Volunteer Reserve.
- Lieutenant (E) Herbert Henry David Campaign.
- Temporary Lieutenant (E) John Richmond.
- Temporary Lieutenant (E) William James Caw Fiddes, Royal Naval Reserve.
- Paymaster Lieutenant John Sydney Devitt, (Retd).
- Temporary Surgeon Lieutenant Simon Meleck, MRCS, LRCP, Royal Naval Volunteer Reserve.
- Temporary Electrical Lieutenant Bernard Harden Champion, Royal Naval Volunteer Reserve.
- Wardmaster Lieutenant Victor Allan Haines, Royal Australian Navy.
- Temporary Skipper Vincent Nicolini, 628, T.S, Royal Naval Reserve.
- Mr. Arthur John Steele, Commissioned Gunner.
- Mr. Reginald Thomas Jones, DSC, Commissioned Engineer.
- Mr. Sidney Lewis Leech, Commissioned Engineer.
- Mr. Joseph Frederick Walker, Commissioned Engineer.
- Mr. Ronald Alfred Edwin Marwood, Commissioned Ordnance Officer.
- Mr. Donald Augustus Claude Hubbard, Signal Boatswain.
- Mr. Gilbert Reynolds, Warrant Telegraphist.
- Mr. Robert Maskell, Temporary Warrant Observer.
- Mr. Frederick James Horn, Warrant Shipwright.
- Mr. Walter Charles Edward McGinnes, Warrant Shipwright.
- Mr. William Burton, Warrant Engineer.
- Mr. Walter Gage Rockey, Temporary Warrant Engineer.
- Mary Elizabeth Perrin Pelloe, Second Officer, Women's Royal Naval Service.

Army

- Lieutenant Robert Norman Adam (25625), Royal Engineers.
- Lieutenant (Quartermaster) Robert George Addis, Special List, Indian Army.
- Captain (temporary Major) Cyril Edgar Adie, Indian Army Ordnance Corps.
- No. 3178111, Warrant Officer Class I, Regimental Sergeant-Major Thomas Allan, The King's Own Scottish Borderers.
- Lieutenant (Quarter-Master) (temporary Captain) Arthur Reginald Colenso Anderson (159257), General List.
- Captain (Quarter-Master) Robert Lewis Angel, MM, (63866), The Rifle Brigade (Prince Consort's Own).
- Subaltern (temporary Junior Commander) Cicely Eleanor Aymer (192382), Auxiliary Territorial Service.
- No. 7733630, Warrant Officer Class I, Staff Sergeant-Major James Claud Backwell, Royal Army Pay Corps.
- No. 4602684, Warrant Officer Class I, Regimental Sergeant-Major Arthur Colin Bagshaw, The Duke of Wellington's Regiment (West Riding).
- Subaltern (temporary Junior Commander) the Honourable Phyllis Patty Barclay (192360), Auxiliary Territorial Service.
- Lieutenant & Paymaster (temporary Captain) Reginald Clyde Bateman (102836), Royal Army Pay Corps.
- Lieutenant Guy Fothergill Batho (109783), Royal Artillery.
- Captain (temporary Major) Ernest Hubert Bax (128041), Royal Army Ordnance Corps.
- Lieutenant (Quarter-Master) Robert Benbow (131127), The Queen's Own Royal West Kent Regiment.
- Lieutenant (temporary Captain) Gervais De La Poer Beresford, MC, DSM, (169120), Royal Engineers.
- No. 2609368, Warrant Officer Class II, Orderly Room Quarter-Master-Sergeant Charles Frank Booth, Grenadier Guards.
- Lieutenant (Quarter-Master) Andrew Gilbert Brown (86452), Royal Artillery.
- Lieutenant Charles Edward Callow, Lincolnshire Home Guard.
- Major John Walter Chitty (99519), The Essex Regiment.
- Warrant Officer Class I (Sub-Conductor (temporary Conductor)) Leonard Clare, Indian Army Corps of Clerks.
- Lieutenant (Quartermaster) (temporary Captain) Reginald Charles Ceilings (90426), Royal Army Service Corps.
- Captain Eric Dudley Comer, Kent Home Guard.
- Captain Harold Tom Coneybeer, Gloucestershire Home Guard.
- Warrant Officer Class I (Sub-Conductor (temporary Conductor)) Harold Cotton, Indian Army Corps of Clerks.
- Lieutenant (Quarter-Master) Bruce Creed (163584), Royal Tank Regiment, Royal Armoured Corps.
- Warrant Officer Class I (Sub-Conductor (temporary Conductor)) Theodore Crowl, Indian Army Ordnance Corps.
- Major Cecil Charles Danby (34243), Royal Corps of Signals.
- Lieutenant (District Officer) William Charles Day, MM, (120460), Royal Artillery.
- Captain Thomas Hamilton Denny, Suffolk Home Guard.
- Warrant Officer Class II (Regimental Quarter-Master-Sergeant) Cyril Derbyshire, Derbyshire Home Guard.
- Lieutenant (temporary Major) William Leslie Dowd, Australian Military Forces.
- Chaplain to the Forces, 4th Class, the Reverend James Cyril Thomas Downes, BA, BD, (94307), Royal Army Chaplains' Department.
- Lieutenant (temporary Captain) Horace Walter Duncan, Australian Military Forces.
- Captain (temporary Major) (Staff Paymaster 2nd Class) Hugh Piers Dyer (101685), Royal Army Pay Corps.
- Senior Commander (temporary Chief Commander) Noel Lindsay Fielden (192028), Auxiliary Territorial Service.
- Lieutenant (Quarter-Master) Cornelius Foley (89410), The Royal Scots Fusiliers.
- Major (temporary Lieutenant-Colonel) George Keith Fulton, MB, (5070), Royal Army Medical Corps.
- Captain (temporary Major) Arthur Bertie Gay, MC, (48709), Royal Artillery.
- Major (temporary Lieutenant-Colonel) William Laurence Gibson (15849), Royal Artillery.
- No. 1896515, Warrant Officer Class I, Sergeant-Major Edward Henry Godden, Royal Engineers.
- Captain Robert Lambert Gorrie, City of Edinburgh Home Guard.
- No. 6335276, Warrant Officer Class II, Quarter-Master-Sergeant (Foreman of Signals) John Redvers Greenfield, Royal Corps of Signals.
- Lieutenant (Quarter-Master) Hector Norman Grieve (131093), The East Yorkshire Regiment (The Duke of York's Own).
- Lieutenant (Assistant Commissary) (temporary Major) Victor Hathaway, Indian Army Ordnance Corps.
- Captain John Newman Heales, MB, (49642), Royal Army Medical Corps.
- Captain Jessie Agnes Taylor Henry, MB, East African Army Medical Corps.
- No. 10968, Warrant Officer Class II, Orderly Room Quarter-Master-Sergeant William Hewitt, The East Yorkshire Regiment (The Duke of York's Own).
- Captain Arthur Stuart Hewson (23980), Royal Artillery.
- Lieutenant Norman Openshaw Higgins, Cambridgeshire Home Guard.
- Captain Bruce Arthur Charles Hills, Warwickshire Home Guard.
- No. 1425097, Warrant Officer Class I, Regimental Sergeant-Major Albert Edward Howe, Royal Artillery.
- Major (Commissary) James Robert Jackson, Corps of Indian Engineers.
- Subadar-Major and Honorary Captain Jit Singh, Sardar Bahadur, OBI, (Honorary Assistant Surgeon), Indian Medical Department.
- Captain Edward Johnson, London Home Guard.
- Captain Thomas Sleman Johnstone, Indian Medical Department.
- Captain (Quarter-Master) Edward David Knight, MM, (62902), The Middlesex Regiment (Duke of Cambridge's Own).
- Subaltern (temporary Junior Commander) Margaret Lockhart Laing (196334), Auxiliary Territorial Service.
- Lieutenant (Quarter-Master) Wyndham Owen Lang (175279), General List.
- Lieutenant (temporary Captain) Wilfred John Leader, Australian Military Forces.
- Captain Augustus Frederick Shirley Leggatt, Devonshire Home Guard.
- No. 2714237, Warrant Officer Class I, Regimental Sergeant-Major Joseph Francis Linnane, MM, The Essex Regiment.
- Chaplain to the Forces, 4th Class, the Reverend George Arthur Lewis Lloyd, BA, (34068), Royal Army Chaplains' Department.
- Captain (Quarter-Master) Alexander Marr, DCM, (56976), The Seaforth Highlanders (Ross-shire Buffs, The Duke of Albany's).
- No. S/12815, Warrant Officer Class I, Staff Sergeant-Major Henry Weatherley Marshall, Royal Army Service Corps.
- Captain (Quarter-Master) (acting Major) Patrick Joseph Martin (66766), Royal Army Medical Corps.
- Lieutenant (Assistant Paymaster) (temporary Captain) Percy Evelyn Matthews (107462), Royal Army Pay Corps.
- Lieutenant (temporary Captain) (acting Major) William Currer McCallum, MC, (106746), Royal Engineers.
- Captain (Deputy Commissary) (temporary Major) Robert Louis McCulloch, Corps of Indian Engineers.
- No. 1852536, Warrant Officer Class II, Clerk of Works, Quarter-Master-Sergeant Hubert McDermott, Royal Engineers.
- Honorary Lieutenant (temporary Captain) Allan Cedric Mclnnes, Instructional Corps, Australian Military Forces.
- Lieutenant & Quarter-Master (temporary Captain & Quarter-Master) Thomas Alexander Stewart McKenzie, Permanent Staff, New Zealand Military Forces.
- No. S/12738, Warrant Officer Class II, Staff Quarter-Master-Sergeant (acting Staff Sergeant-Major) Joseph Edward McKeowen, Royal Army Service Corps.
- Captain William Singer McMillan, Dumfriesshire Home Guard.
- No. 7581328, Warrant Officer Class I, Sub-Conductor Arthur Frederick Meaden, Royal Army Ordnance Corps.
- Captain (Quarter-Master) (temporary Major) Leon Alfred Moore (98538), General List.
- No. 7582880, Warrant Officer Class I, Sub-Conductor (acting Conductor) Walter Dacres Moore, Royal Army Ordnance Corps.
- Lieutenant (temporary Captain) Herbert Harold Morrell, MC, (118648), The Royal Warwickshire Regiment.
- Lieutenant (Assistant Paymaster) (temporary Captain) Frederick Victor Mundy (131194), Royal Army Pay Corps.
- Lieutenant (temporary Captain) Alfred Hembry Oxenford (118106), Royal Army Service Corps.
- No. S/35321, Warrant Officer Class I, Staff-Sergeant-Major Frederick John Parker, Royal Army Service Corps.
- No. 1412876, Warrant Officer Class I, Master Gunner 1st Class William Leslie Parker, Royal Artillery.
- Captain John Edgar Penny, MC, Essex Home Guard.
- Lieutenant (Quarter-Master) Archibald William Perry (99471), The King's Shropshire Light Infantry.
- Captain (temporary Major) John Dennis Paxton-Petty, BA, (39123), Royal Engineers.
- Lieutenant (Quarter-Master) (acting Captain) Robert Lyddon Player (157902), The Inns of Court Regiment, Royal Armoured Corps.
- No. 1032507, Warrant Officer Class I, Regimental-Sergeant-Major Septimus George Poole, Royal Artillery.
- Lieutenant (Quarter-Master) Gilbert Percy Price (143888), General List.
- Captain (temporary Major) William Thomas Richard Rainford (98163), General List.
- Warrant Officer Class I (Sub-Conductor) Henry Arthur Rankin, Indian Army Ordnance Corps.
- Lieutenant (Assistant Ordnance Mechanical Engineer) William Richard Reed (216793), Royal Army Ordnance Corps.
- Captain (temporary Major) David Talbot Rice (101864), Special List.
- Lieutenant (Quarter-Master) John Herbert Rignell (103497), Royal Artillery.
- Lieutenant (temporary Captain) David Mawdsley Ritchie, MC, (106859), Royal Artillery.
- Captain (Ordnance Mechanical Engineer 3rd Class) (temporary Major) (Ordnance Mechanical Engineer 2nd Class) Gerald Rhodes Rosevere (43484), Royal Army Ordnance Corps.
- Lieutenant (Quarter-Master) Alexander Ross (107155), Scots Guards.
- Major (temporary Lieutenant-Colonel) Eric Leopold Otto Sachs, KC, (98437), Royal Artillery.
- Major Neil Schokman, ED, Ceylon Engineers.
- Captain (temporary Major) Howard Phillips Skinner (56807), The Duke of Wellington's Regiment (West Riding).
- No. 2714496, Warrant Officer Class I (Superintending Clerk) Arthur Frederick Smith, Irish Guards.
- Lieutenant (Quarter-Master) (temporary Captain) Edward James Smith (115121), Royal Artillery.
- Captain (temporary Major) Herbert Maurice Victor Norman Smith, AMIMechE, AMIAE, Indian Army.
- Captain (temporary Major) Norman Henry Graves Smith (49480), Royal Engineers.
- Captain William John Snelgrove, Monmouthshire Home Guard.
- Lieutenant (Mechanist Officer) (temporary Captain) Albert Edward Springett (115530), Royal Army Service Corps.
- Captain (temporary Major) Warren Trestrail Stephens (106901), Royal Engineers.
- Major & Paymaster (temporary Staff Paymaster 2nd Class) Harold Charles Harker Taylor (32185), Royal Army Pay Corps.
- Lieutenant (Quarter-Master) Leonard Taylor (86385), Royal Artillery.
- Lieutenant (Quarter-Master) Harry Thorpe (72677), The Lovat Scouts.
- Lieutenant (temporary Captain) William Gordon Topham (171074), Pioneer Corps.
- Lieutenant (Quarter-Master) Christopher Rowland Turner (41526), Royal Artillery.
- No. 7583248, Warrant Officer Class II, Armament Quarter-Master-Sergeant, Acting Warrant Officer Class I, Armament Sergeant Major Leslie James Walker, Royal Army Ordnance Corps.
- Lieutenant (Quarter-Master) (temporary Captain) James Henry Warren (123323), Royal Army Medical Corps.
- Lieutenant (Assistant Inspector of Armourers) Robert Emmanuel Warry (93290), Royal Army Ordnance Corps.
- Captain (temporary Major) Malcolm Stuart Waterstone (90262), Royal Army Service Corps.
- No. 4794006, Warrant Officer Class I, Regimental Sergeant-Major Alfred Webb, The Lincolnshire Regiment.
- No. 6190690, Warrant Officer Class I, Regimental Sergeant-Major Harry Haken Webb, Welsh Guards.
- No. 1416895, Warrant Officer Class I, Sergeant-Major (Assistant Instructor in Gunnery) Ernest John Weller, Royal Artillery.
- Captain Reginald Owen West, Surrey Home Guard.
- Warrant Officer Class II (Company-Sergeant Major) Arthur Charles Frederick Wheeler, West Riding Home Guard.
- Senior Commander (temporary Chief Commander) Katherine Whiddington (192086), Auxiliary Territorial Service.
- Lieutenant (temporary Captain) John Gerald Maunsell How-White (74972), Royal Engineers.
- Subaltern (temporary Junior Commander) Evelyn Dorothy Wilson (192982), Auxiliary Territorial Service.
- No. 1864136, Warrant Officer Class II, Quarter-Master-Sergeant Instructor Algernon Alfred Wright, Royal Engineers.
- Captain John Vincent Wrigley, Cheshire Home Guard.

Royal Air Force

- Flight Lieutenant Owen Edward Bartlett (31421).
- Flight Lieutenant John Bowran Currie, DCM, (43750).
- Flight Lieutenant Charles Fenn (07079), Reserve of Air Force Officers.
- Flight Lieutenant Glen Edward Grindlay Grindlay (75693), Royal Air Force Volunteer Reserve.
- Flight Lieutenant Duncan Macdonnell Jannaway (31279).
- Flight Lieutenant Edmund George Pole (75293), Royal Air Force Volunteer Reserve.
- Flight Lieutenant William Henry Ralph Reader (75026), Royal Air Force Volunteer Reserve.
- Flight Lieutenant George Robert Wiltcher (44645).
- Acting Flight Lieutenant (now Acting Squadron Leader) William Shaw Baddeley (78377), Royal Air Force Volunteer Reserve.
- Acting Flight Lieutenant Percy George Coleman (44364).
- Acting Flight Lieutenant David Charles Davies (78644), Royal Air Force Volunteer Reserve.
- Acting Flight Lieutenant Norman Kempton Dyson (87100), Royal Air Force Volunteer Reserve.
- Acting Flight Lieutenant John Hayward Holland (84542), Royal Air Force Volunteer Reserve.
- Acting Flight Lieutenant Edward Rupert Somers Joce (43215).
- Acting Flight Lieutenant Charles William Morle (81182), Royal Air Force Volunteer Reserve.
- Acting Flight Lieutenant John Leonard Newton, MM, (44511).
- Acting Flight Lieutenant Geoffrey Lawrence O'Hanlon, (44090).
- Acting Flight Lieutenant David Patterson (88505), Royal Air Force Volunteer Reserve.
- Acting Flight Lieutenant Edwin James Praill (45284).
- Acting Flight Lieutenant John Samuel Rowlands (73378), Royal Air Force Volunteer Reserve.
- Captain Cecil William Lippiatt (202911), South African Air Force.
- Flying Officer Arthur Grosvenor Alsop (83846), Royal Air Force Volunteer Reserve.
- Flying Officer William Wayles Cornish (46152).
- Flying Officer Reginald Thomas Walter Evans (45102).
- Flying Officer Eric Charles Seeley (47041).
- Flying Officer Garbet Westcott (77872), Royal Air Force Volunteer Reserve.
- Acting Flying Officer Leslie William Percival (46413).
- Acting Flying Officer Frederick Walker (46273).
- Acting Flying Officer Frederick John Walters (45770).
- Warrant Officer George Bannister (365170).
- Warrant Officer Alfred Herbert Bell (353808).
- Warrant Officer Richard Carruthers (564131).
- Warrant Officer Horace Ramsey Green (149682).
- Warrant Officer Ernest Pouard (301444).
- Warrant Officer John Purkiss (220951).
- Warrant Officer Terence Lawson Reeves (560256).
- Warrant Officer Percival John Soper (362664).
- Warrant Officer Roderick William Toole (350756).
- Warrant Officer Alfred Frederick Townsend (330430).
- Warrant Officer Henry Watson (564490).
- Sister Letitia Jones, Princess Mary's Royal Air Force Nursing Service.
- Flight Officer Constance Marion Colbeck-Davis, Women's Auxiliary Air Force.
- Acting Squadron Leader Gerald Patrick O'Loughlin, Royal Australian Air Force.
- Acting Squadron Leader John Arnold Power, Royal Australian Air Force.
- Pilot Officer Elwyn Boyce White, Royal Australian Air Force.
- Flight Lieutenant Donald Edward Grigg (NZ.1139), Royal New Zealand Air Force.

Civil Division

- Alexander Aberdein, Superintendent, Manchester Police Force.
- Herbert Allen, Managing Director of the Yelloway Motor Services Ltd., Rochdale.
- Mary Andrews, MRCS, LRCP, Chief Civil Defence Warden, Chapel-en-le-Frith, Derbyshire.
- Elsa Helene Appleyard, Clerical Officer, Prime Minister's Office.
- The Honourable Barbara Baird, Deputy Regional Administrator, North Midland Region, Women's Voluntary Services for Civil Defence.
- Captain David Barclay, Chief Pilot of Scottish Airways.
- Ernest Walter Barker, Honorary Secretary, Cardiff Savings Committee.
- Helen Barron, JP, Organiser, Inverness Burgh, Women's Voluntary Services for Civil Defence.
- Ernest Alfred Bates, Staff Officer, HM Treasury.
- Mervyn William Beale, Chief Administrative Officer for Civil Defence, Lancashire.
- Benjamin Bentley, Divisional Officer No. 4 (Leeds) Area Headquarters, National Fire Service.
- Joan Margaret Mary George Berkeley, Centre Organiser and Billeting Officer for Banbury Rural District, Women's Voluntary Services for Civil Defence.
- Walter George Bishop, Divisional Honorary Secretary of the Soldiers', Sailors' and Airmen's Families Association, Bromley.
- Annie MacColl Blythe, Matron, Friern Hospital, New Southgate.
- Peter Bonar, Chief Officer, Merchant Navy.
- Eleanor Bradley, Chairman, Leeds Street Savings Group Committee.
- Winifred Bramhall, Inspector of Welfare of the Blind, Ministry of Health.
- Reginald Martin Brimacombe, Senior Staff Clerk, War Office.
- Alexander Jackson Brown, Divisional Honorary Secretary, Soldiers', Sailors' & Airmen's Families Association, Weymouth and Portland.
- Captain Herbert Buxton, Master, Merchant Navy.
- Captain Alexander Cameron, lately Master, Merchant Navy.
- Edith Florence Cassady, Honorary County Borough Organiser, Bootle, Women's Voluntary Services for Civil Defence.
- Annette Chard, County Secretary, North Riding of Yorkshire, Women's Voluntary Services for Civil Defence.
- Robert Stephen Kemble Cheek, Senior Staff Officer, Admiralty.
- William Clarkson, Higher Clerical Officer, India Office.
- Dorothy Collington, Divisional Honorary Secretary of the Soldiers', Sailors' & Airmen's Families Association, Coventry.
- Arthur Collins, Outside Manager, Vickers-Armstrongs Ltd.
- Joseph Cooling, Skipper of a Steam Trawler.
- Mary Jane Coombes, Matron and Senior Stewardess, Merchant Navy.
- Gladys Mary Penly Cooper, County Superintendent and Secretary, West Suffolk County Nursing Association. Voluntary Organiser for the Civil Nursing Reserve for West Suffolk.
- Thomas Coleman-Cooper, First Aid Commandant, Penzance.
- John Rae Cowie, Vice-Chairman of Aberdeen, Banff & Kincardine Local Employment Committee.
- Margaret Bessie Cross, Director of the Junior Section of the British Red Cross Society.
- Alexander Currie, Third Senior Engineer, Merchant Navy.
- Charles Christie Davies, Steward, Class I, HM Prison Wandsworth.
- John Edwardes Davies, Chief Civil Defence Warden and Air Raid Precautions Officer, St. Pancras.
- Sarah Emma Esme Edmonds Davies, Matron, Royal Naval & Royal Marine Maternity Home, Canada House, Chatham. For services to Civil Defence.
- Percy Edward Davis, Senior Stores and Accounts Officer, Air Ministry.
- Dove Agnes Dawson, County Secretary, Midlothian Branch, British Red Cross Society.
- Henry Lewis de Bourcier, Senior Staff Officer, Mines Department.
- Captain Alexander Thompson Dodds, Master, Merchant Navy.
- Walter Parsons Dover, Staff Officer, Board of Inland Revenue.
- William John Downie, Skipper of a Steam Drifter.
- William Herbert Dunham, Chief Billeting Officer and Sanitary Inspector, East Grinstead Urban District Council.
- William Martin Ellis, Chief Mate, Merchant Navy.
- Albert Edward Eperon, Higher Clerical Officer, Ministry of Food.
- Eric Christopher Carlyon Evans, Actuary, Manchester & Salford Savings Bank.
- Howell Justin Evans, Secretary for Training to the National Association of Boys' Clubs.
- Frederick George Eyles, lately Headmaster of Norcot Senior School, Reading.
- Frank Fellowes, Technical Superintendent, Dunlop Rubber Company, Ltd.
- Walter Austin Fenner, Second Engineer, Merchant Navy.
- Thomas William Finch, Chief Civil Defence Warden, Ilford.
- Thomas Foreman, Chief Officer, Merchant Navy.
- Charles Valdemar Forsberg, Fourth Engineer, Merchant Navy.
- Captain Alfred Fraser, Master, Merchant Navy.
- George Johnson Fraser, Staff Officer, No. 6 Southern Region, Ministry of Health.
- John Douglas Galliard, AMIEE, Electrical Superintendent, Mersey Docks and Harbour Board.
- Arthur Reginald George, Headmaster of the Senior Council School, Plympton, Devon.
- Captain Thomas Gilmour, Master, Merchant Navy.
- May Goodwin, Member of the Leicester Local Employment Committee.
- Captain Harry Philip Gouge, Master, Merchant Navy.
- Charles Job Goulson, Divisional Air Raid Precautions Sub-Controller, Skegness.
- Thomas Stuart Grant, Civil Assistant and Accountant, Grade I, Air Ministry.
- Marcus Arthur Greenhill, Senior Staff Officer, Colonial Office.
- William Henry Archibald Groom, Surveyor, Board of Customs and Excise.
- William Paul Haldane, Deputy City Engineer, Edinburgh. For services to Civil Defence.
- William Hall, Skipper of a Steam Trawler.
- Ernest Halton, MC, Chief Radio Officer, Merchant Navy.
- Sidney Frederick Hardie, Column Officer, North Eastern Area of Scotland, National Fire Service.
- Edwin Beaumont Harrington, Divisional Officer, No. 8 (Nottingham) Area, National Fire Service.
- John Healy, Officer-in-Charge of the Royal Air Force Comforts Fund and Secretary of the Royal Air Force Comforts Committee.
- William Alfred Frank Hearne, Honorary Secretary, Luton Savings Council.
- James Richard Hembrough, Executive Engineer, Ministry of Home Security.
- Violet Winifred Henderson, Higher Clerical Officer, Assistance Board.
- Robert Beattie Wylie Henry, DCM, Senior Staff Officer, Ministry of Pensions.
- Philip George Heppenstall, Elected Member of the National Savings Committee. Joint Honorary Secretary, Barnstaple Savings Committee.
- Hilda Margaret Hetherington, County Secretary, Buckinghamshire Branch, British Red Cross Society.
- Ronald Ivor Hicks, Air Raid Precautions Officer, Glamorgan County Council.
- The Reverend Frederick Harcourt Hillersdon, JP, Rector of St. Mary's-le-Strand. For public services in Westminster.
- Percy Charles Hinds, Works Manager, Sperry Gyroscope Company Ltd.
- Albert Cecil Horst, Skipper of a Steam Trawler.
- Harold Houghton, Rating and Valuation Officer and Billeting Officer, Newton-le-Willows Urban District Council, Lancashire.
- Sybil Dorothea Howard, Group Administrator, Surrey, Women's Voluntary Services for Civil Defence.
- Ada Jeanie Innes, Head of the Overseas Section/Central Hospital Supply Services, War Organisation of the British Red Cross Society & Order of St. John.
- Thomas Jackson, Chief Civil Defence Warden, Stockton-on-Tees, Durham.
- The Reverend Canon Alfred Llewelyn Jones, MC, MA, lately Rector of Lambeth.
- David Pugh Jones, Clerk & Chief Billeting Officer, Dolgelly Rural District Council.
- Captain Edgar Jones, Master, Merchant Navy.
- Richard Jones, Second Officer, Merchant Navy.
- William Robertson Jones, Higher Clerical Officer, Offices of the War Cabinet.
- Henry Armitage Jowett, (Captain, late the West Yorkshire Regiment (Prince of Wales's Own) T.A.), Observer Group Officer, Royal Observer Corps.
- Andrew Kay, Provost of Newton Stewart, Wigtownshire.
- James Keir, FEIS, Honorary Secretary, Arbroath Local Savings Committee.
- John Kemp, Staff Officer, Ministry of Food.
- Christine Ethel Kennedy, Assistant County Air Raid Precautions Officer, Stratford-on-Avon.
- Thomas William Kenner, Accountant, Royal Mint.
- Madeleine Odell Kerr, Honorary Secretary & Lady Superintendent, Police Seaside Home, Hove.
- William Woodfield Kidd, Assistant Secretary, Territorial Army & Air Force Association of the County of Lancaster (West).
- Violet Helen King, Centre Organiser, Rochester, Women's Voluntary Services for Civil Defence.
- Wilfred King, Chief Officer, Merchant Navy.
- Joseph Young Kirkup, lately Assistant Fire Force Commander, No. 17 (Bristol) Area, National Fire Service.
- Charles Richard Kirton, Accounts Clerk, Imperial War Graves Commission.
- John Thomas Knaggs, Superintendent, Durham County Police Force.
- Herbert Joseph Lawton, Second Engineer, Merchant Navy.
- James Leatham, JP, Provost of Turriff, Aberdeenshire.
- Captain James Forbes-Leith, Retired Officer, War Office.
- Martha Liddle, JP. For services to Civil Defence, Spennymoor, Durham.
- Charles Ernest Lucette, Air Raid Precautions Officer, Manchester Ship Canal Company.
- William Walton Lund, Manager, Messrs. J. Russell & Co. Ltd., London.
- William Kennedy MacDonald, Chief Engineer, Merchant Navy.
- Armour John Macfarlane, District Commandant, Ulster Special Constabulary.
- John Mclntosh, Assistant Postmaster, Head Post Office, Glasgow.
- Captain Murdock Mackenzie, Master, Merchant Navy.
- Angus McKinnon, Chief Engineer, Merchant Navy.
- Captain Frederic William McLaren, Master, Merchant Navy.
- Donald Matheson McLeod, MA, Headmaster of Denholm Central Rural School, Roxburghshire.
- Patrick Joseph McParland, Mate, Merchant Navy.
- William Hill Macrostie, Superintendent, Handley Page Ltd.
- Hugh Harvey McTaggart, FSI, Quantity Surveyor, Department of Health for Scotland.
- Frances Winifred Alberta Mann, Chief Superintendent of Typists, Ministry of War Transport.
- Samuel Barnaby Manning, Column Officer No. 12 (Cambridge) Area, National Fire Service.
- Martha Annie Marks, Matron, Preston & County of Lancaster Royal Infirmary.
- Edward George Marsden, Principal Assistant to the Secretary, Railway Executive Committee.
- Leonard Massey, Air Raid Precautions Officer, Halifax.
- Frank Benjamin Matthews, Public Assistance Officer, Lindsey (Lincolnshire). For services to Civil Defence.
- Archibald Russell Mercer, Chief Steward, Merchant Navy.
- James Miller, Skipper of a Steam Trawler.
- Anne Mary Milligan, RRC, Regional Nursing Officer, South Eastern District of Scotland. For services to Civil Defence.
- Ralph Eric Mills, Technical Assistant, Ministry of Aircraft Production.
- Mabel Alice Moir, Chief Superintendent of Typists, Ministry of Food.
- John Alexander Moore, Town Clerk of Wick, Caithness.
- Robert Moorhead, Superintendent, Royal Ordnance Factory.
- Albert Edward Morley, Manager, Ministry of Labour & National Service Employment Exchange, Gateshead-on-Tyne.
- Captain Charles Burn Muir, Master, Merchant Navy.
- Catherine Boyd Munro, Honorary representative of the Shipwrecked Mariners' Society, Greenock & Gourock.
- Frederick William Nicholas Murphy, Superintendent, Royal Ordnance Filling Factory.
- Andrew Murray, Vice-Chairman of the Swansea Local Employment Committee.
- Commander Peter Mursell, Officer Commanding, No. 6 Ferry Pilot Pool, Air Transport Auxiliary, British Overseas Airways Corporation.
- Thomas Nesbitt, Head of the Finance Division, Government Office, Isle of Man.
- Wilfrid Turner Nicholls, JP, Air Raid Precautions Sub-Controller, Gloucester Rural District.
- Thomas Pilkington Norris, MC, Group Labour Manager, Imperial Chemical Industries Works.
- Cyril Needham Norton, Civil Defence Training Officer, Sheffield.
- Henry Sebastian Noyes, Deputy Area Commandant, Western Area Headquarters, Royal Observer Corps.
- Anne Winefride O'Reilly, Acting Headmistress of Peckham Central School.
- Frederick Orman, Chief Steward, Merchant Navy.
- Hermann John Otten, Assistant Superintendent of Stores, Ministry of Works & Buildings.
- Councillor Gladys Nellie Paling, JP, Area Organiser for the Don Valley, Women's Voluntary Services for Civil Defence, and Honorary Welfare Officer for the Doncaster Rural District Council.
- Peter George Parkhurst, Staff Officer, Ministry of War Transport.
- James Brown Paterson, Works Manager, Beardmore Diesels Ltd., Dalmuir.
- Alberta Diana Paynter, County Director, Leicestershire British Red Cross Society.
- Jacob Mark Paynton, Secretary of the Drapers' Chamber of Trade.
- Florence Maud Perry, Senior Women's Staff Officer (London), British Broadcasting Corporation.
- Captain Arthur Gordon Petrie, Chief Civil Defence Warden, Hendon.
- Rose Alice Peverall, Clerical Officer, Ministry of Economic Warfare.
- Leo Oswald Philbin, in charge of administration, Home Institutes Service, Navy, Army & Air Force Institutes.
- John Warburton Phillips, Local Social Welfare Officer, Blackburn District, Western Command.
- Arthur John Pilditch, Chief Officer, Merchant Navy.
- Susannah Ethel Pinney, Warden of the Josephine Butler Memorial House, Liverpool.
- Edward Richard Ventris Porter, Divisional Organiser of the Amalgamated Engineering Union.
- Harry Royston Portman, Senior Staff Officer, Ministry of Information.
- Captain James Hunter Potts, Master, Merchant Navy.
- Joyce Powrie, Senior Area Officer, attached to No. 10 (Manchester) Regional Headquarters, National Fire Service.
- Robert Owen Pratt, Chief Officer, HM Cable Ship Alert, General Post Office.
- John Rae, Senior Second Engineer, Merchant Navy.
- Ida Mary Ralph, Superintendent Health Visitor, Bristol.
- Edwin Harold Ranee, Senior Establishment and Accounts Officer, Foreign Office.
- Claud Gordon Ransom, Higher Executive Officer, Board of Inland Revenue.
- Mary Kerr Rathie, Senior Nurse, Standard Motor Company Ltd., (Aero Engines). For services to Civil Defence.
- Thomson Reid, Chief Engineer, Merchant Navy.
- James Richardson, Tugmaster, Admiralty.
- Harold Shepherd Rigg, Purser, Merchant Navy.
- Joshua O'Bethel Riley, Skipper of a Steam Trawler.
- Alice Robertson, Secretary of the Women's Land Army Committee for Lancashire.
- James Anderson Robertson, Officer-in-Charge, Air Raid Precautions Section, and Superintendent, Glasgow Police Force.
- David Robert Robbie, Second Engineer, Merchant Navy.
- Thomas Robinson, Cleansing Superintendent, Newcastle upon Tyne.
- Thomas Robinson, Chief Actuary, London Trustee Savings Bank, lately Actuary, Finsbury and City of London Savings Bank.
- Captain James Bowmaker Rochester, Master, Merchant Navy.
- Alice Marie Rothbarth, First Class Officer, Ministry of Labour & National Service.
- Captain John Owen Rowlands, Master, Merchant Navy.
- Eric Sandys, Chief Officer, Merchant Navy.
- John Scott, Chairman, Kelso & District Local Savings Committee.
- Kathleen Mary Shaw, Personal Assistant to the Dean, London School of Hygiene & Tropical Medicine.
- Henry Alfred Shorter, Senior Company Officer, No. 30 (East Kent) Area, National Fire Service.
- Frank Settles Siddall, Senior Executive Officer, Board of Customs & Excise.
- Frederick William James Sills, Chief Steward, Merchant Navy.
- Bertram Richard Simons, Chief Officer, Merchant Navy.
- Alderman William Edmund Simpson, Chairman of the Fleetwood Local Employment Committee.
- Denis Eli Skelding, Member of the Midland Regional Transport Committee. Manager, Road Passenger & Transport Association Ltd.
- Captain Joseph Edmunds Slattery, Chief Air Raid Precautions Officer, Hertfordshire.
- William Medhurst Smith, Senior Staff Officer, General Post Office.
- William Robert Snell, Controller of a Group Centre, Royal Observer Corps.
- Captain Frank Stammers, Retired Officer, War Office.
- William Stuart Stanbury, MD, LMS, Regional Blood Transfusion Officer, Emergency Medical Service.
- William Henry Stephens, Staff Officer, Ministry of Finance, Northern Ireland.
- Major Horace Fred Stimson, TD, Air Raid Precautions Officer, County of Cardigan.
- Stanley George Blaxland Stubbs, Organising Chairman, Leatherhead Savings Committee.
- Margaret Mary Sullivan, Personal Assistant to the Chairman, Women's Voluntary Services for Civil Defence.
- Phyllis Margaret Annie Sykes, Secretary of the Women's Land Army Committee for London & Middlesex.
- Anne Taylor, Matron-in-Chief, Ministry of Pensions Nursing Service.
- Dorothy Marion Noel Breffney Ternan, Clerical Officer, Admiralty.
- Helen Louisa Thomas, Chief Superintendent of Typists, Ministry of Aircraft Production.
- Vera Beatrice Herbert Thomas, County Borough Organiser, Bristol, Women's Voluntary Services for Civil Defence.
- Harry Louis Thompson, Skipper of a Steam Trawler.
- Frederick George Thomsett, Skipper of a Steam Trawler.
- Gladys Maud Robina Thwaites, Assistant Public Assistance Officer, Newcastle upon Tyne. For services to Civil Defence.
- Archibald Stanley Tolhurst, Senior Staff Officer, Board of Trade.
- Harold Travers, Chief Civil Defence Warden, Bermondsey.
- Captain Edward Henry Tuckwell, MC, DL, Commandant, Surrey Special Constabulary.
- Leslie Bertram Turner, Deputy Assistant Director, Explosives Department, Ministry of Supply.
- Ernest Rudolph Tyzack, Chief Engineering Assistant, County Borough of Great Yarmouth. For services to Civil Defence.
- Joseph John Unwin, Scientific Officer, Ministry of Aircraft Production.
- James Waddell, Chief Officer, Merchant Navy.
- James Clare Wade, Purser, Merchant Navy.
- William Henry Alexander Wagg, Chief Engineer, Merchant Navy.
- Harold Clark Walker, Senior EngineerSurveyor, Ministry of War Transport.
- Frank George Ward, Assistant Administrative Officer, Board of Education.
- Leonard Weatherall, Railway Liaison Officer (London, Midland and Scottish Railway), Mines Department.
- Jack Leslie Webster, Head of the Air Raid Precautions Department, Great Western Railway.
- Edith Elizabeth Welch, Principal Clerk, Post Office Savings Bank.
- Roy Leslie White, Air Raid Precautions Officer, County Borough of Southend-onSea.
- Stuart George Wilce, Chief Officer, Merchant Navy.
- James Smith Wilkes, Establishment Officer, Public Trustee Office.
- Charles Jeffery Willmot, Chief Inspector, General Post Office.
- Frederick Charles Wilson, District Superintendent, Stratford, London and North Eastern Railway.
- Thomas Reginald Amery Windeatt, Chief Civil Defence Warden, Torbay Area.
- Doris Marguerite Wolfson, Centre Organiser, Uckfield, Women's Voluntary Services for Civil Defence.
- Harry Wood, Chairman of the North Eastern Region Coal Transport Advisory Joint Committee.
- John William Wood, Co-Chief Civil Defence Warden and Sub-Controller, Southampton.
- Captain Charles Wilfred Woods, Master, Merchant Navy.
- William Worthington, Assistant Secretary, Manchester Chamber of Commerce.
- John Henry Wright, FRSanI, Air Raid Precautions Officer, Smethwick.
- Raymond de Courcy Baldwin, British Vice-Consul at Beirut.
- Charles Broughton, British Vice-Consul at Lisbon.
- Jessie Brown, Matron of the Anglo-American Hospital at Cairo.
- Edward John Clark, a British subject resident in Rio de Janeiro.
- Amy Fallen, Clerical Officer at His Majesty's Consulate-General at San Francisco.
- Bernard Charles Flynn, Head Archivist and Accountant at His Majesty's Embassy at Cairo.
- Thomas William Glover, Higher Clerical Archivist at His Majesty's Embassy at Rio de Janeiro.
- Elaine Hills-Young, Principal of the Midwives Training School, Sudan Medical Service.
- William John Leach, Administrator-General, Legal Department, Sudan Government.
- Thomas William Morray, Director of the British Institute at Bagdad.
- Arthur Henry Noble, His Majesty's Consul at San Juan.
- Chantry Hamilton Page, British Vice Consul at Istanbul.
- Marian Pym, a British subject resident in Montreux.
- Alice Mary Corbin. For services to the King George & Queen Elizabeth Club for Service Women of the Empire, London.
- Johannes Peter Jones, Senior Postmaster, Basutoland.
- Myra Helen Melville. For services to the King George & Queen Elizabeth Club for Overseas Troops, Glasgow.
- Henry Charles Mundell, Agricultural & Livestock Officer, Basutoland.
- Henry Victor Pinks, Chief Accountant, Royal Empire Society.
- Beatrice Agnes Richardson. For social welfare services in Southern Rhodesia.
- Eileen May Rischbieth, Organiser of the Royal Naval Friendly Union of Sailors Wives & Mothers. in the State of South Australia.
- Edward Bruce Shepherd. For social welfare services in Southern Rhodesia.
- Ida Marion Brown (wife of Captain W. E. Brown, Chief Pilot, Bombay Port Trust), Bombay.
- Gwladys Campbell, Honorary Secretary, Lady Mary Herbert's Bengal Women's War Fund, Bengal.
- Rani Digraj Kunwari (widow of the late Raja Harnam Singh, Taluqdar of Ramnagar Dhameri), Rais, Ganeshpur, Bara Banki District, United Provinces.
- Jerusha Jhirad, MD, BS, Medical Officer in Charge, Cama & Albless Hospitals, Bombay.
- Anne Stiffle, Proprietor, Stiffle's Hotel and Vice-President, Municipal Committee, Dalhousie, Punjab.
- Hazel Violet Twells, Indian Educational Service, Inspectress of Girls' Schools, Central Division, Poona, Bombay.
- Bessie Matilda, Lady Ward (wife of Colonel Sir John Ward, KBE, CMG, CIE, DSO, Director, Port Trust, Basra).
- Meriall Ida White (wife of Captain S. E. C. White, Lloyd's Agent), Bombay.
- Abdul Aziz, Executive Engineer, Public Works Department, Buildings & Roads Branch, Punjab.
- Rao Bahadur Haji Abdul Hamid Khan, Rais and Zamindar, Bagpat, Meerut District, United Provinces.
- Hugh Benedict Adams, Divisional Electrical Engineer, North-Western Railway, Lahore.
- Khan Bahadur Ahmed Khan, Zamindar, Sind.
- Tara Persad Barat, Deputy Controller of Purchase, Cotton Textiles Directorate, Bombay.
- Sidney Barr, Refinery Superintendent, His Majesty's Mint, Bombay.
- Pherumal Ghanshamdas Bhagat, Deputy Controller of Purchase, Office of the Chief Controller of Purchase (Supply), Government of India.
- Naushir Cursetji Bharucha, Advocate, Bombay.
- Thakur Bisheshwar Singh, Deputy Superintendent of Police (Retd.), Special Magistrate, Fatehgarh, United Provinces.
- John Cyril Burton, Manager, Messrs. Peirce Leslie & Co. Ltd., Coimbatore Branch, Madras.
- Lieutenant-Colonel Karuna Kumar Chatterjee, FRCS, District Superintendent, St. John Ambulance Brigade, Bengal.
- William Thomas Eccleston, Executive Engineer, Public Works Department, Buildings & Roads Branch, Punjab.
- James Victor Stuart Edwards, Assistant Director of Engineering, Railway Department (Railway Board), Government of India.
- Jnanendra Mohan Ghose, Registrar in Insolvency, High Court, Calcutta, Bengal.
- Khan Bahadur Mian Ghulam Rasul, Retired Deputy Superintendent of Police, Commander, Civic Guards, Jhang, Punjab.
- Arthur Gravell, Superintending Engineer, Nahan Foundry, Sirmur State.
- Major Albert Hodges, G.S.O.2, General Headquarters, India.
- Lieutenant James Eyre Howard, Indian Medical Department, Assistant Port Health Officer, Karachi.
- William Arthur Huitt, Manager, The Coromandel Co. Ltd., Cocanada, East Godavari District, Madras.
- Rai Bahadur Lala Izzat Rai, Additional District Magistrate, Lahore, Punjab.
- Alfred Gladwin Jacob, Controller of Accounts, Air Forces in India.
- Moulvi Muhammad Jan Khan, Zamindar, Dadon, Aligarh District, United Provinces.
- Kandappa Durai, Senior Superintendent, Way & Works, East Indian Railway, Howrah.
- Rai Sahib Lala Ram Jawaya Kapur, Proprietor, The Kapur Art Printing Works, Lahore, Punjab.
- Lieutenant Kewal Krishna Chaudhri, New City, Etawah, United Provinces.
- William Adrian Kidd, Assistant Manager, Messrs. James Finlay & Co., Chittagong, Bengal.
- Captain Edward Dudley King, Staff Captain, Quartermaster-General's Branch, General Headquarters, India.
- Syed Masum Ali, Superintendent, District Jail, Amravati, Central Provinces & Berar.
- Major Allan Howard Niblett, Staff Captain, Adjutant-General's Branch, General Headquarters, India.
- Rai Bahadur Sudershun Hariram Pandit, MS (Bom.), DO (Oxon.), Lecturer in Surgery, King Edward Hospital Medical School, and Medical Officer in Charge, Ophthalmic Department, K.E.M. Hospital, Indore.
- Rao Bahadur Manda Venkata Appa Rao Pantulu, Retired Deputy Assistant Registrar, Co-operative Societies, Orissa.
- Tom Parks, Assistant Works Manager, Gun & Shell Factory, Cossipore.
- Vithal Nathu Patil, Barrister-at-Law, District Government Pleader and Public Prosecutor, East Khandesh, Bombay.
- Major Allen Oswald Charles Pettyfer, 10th Baluch Regiment, Indian Army, lately Military Adviser to the Government of Muscat and Oman.
- Thakur Prithi Singh, Major, Indian Army (Retd.), Colonel in the Kotah State Forces, General Officer Commanding, Kotah State Forces.
- Sardar Bahadur Joaquim Nascimento Rodrigues, Landholder, Yavatmal, Central Provinces & Berar.
- Khan Bahadur Sadullah Khan, Assistant Commissioner, Peshawar, North-West Frontier Province.
- Robert Morton Saner, Indian Civil Service, Under-Secretary to the Government of India in the Defence Department.
- Rai Bahadur Binode Bihari Sarkar, Deputy Secretary, Revenue Department, Bengal.
- Seth Muhammad Sarwar, MRCVS, Superintendent, Civil Veterinary Department, North-West Frontier Province.
- Mohamed Siddique Hasan, Assistant Deputy Director-General, Posts & Telegraphs.
- Muhammad Taher, JP, Bandra, Bombay.
- Frank Austen Tucker, Chief Officer, Calcutta Fire Brigade, Bengal.
- Philip Ignatius Blanc, Officer-in-charge, Bonded Warehouses, Trinidad.
- William Buttery, Chief Train Controller, Kenya & Uganda Railways and Harbours Administration.
- Mary Olive Marjorie Carter, Principal, School for Deaf & Blind, Ceylon.
- Archibald Benson Cavaghan, Collector of Customs, Cyprus.
- Ernest Meredyth Hyde-Clarke, Colonial Administrative Service, District Officer, Kenya.
- Hannah Benka-Coker. For social welfare work in Sierra Leone.
- Louis Arthur Gaston Cupidon, Special Grade Clerk, Colonial Secretary's Office, Mauritius.
- Ernest George Garrity, MM, Works Manager, Public Works Department, Nigeria.
- Vida Mildred Geering. For social welfare work in the Gambia.
- Marjorie Gilbert. For social welfare work in Bermuda.
- Cecil John Green, Works Manager, Messrs. Harrtz & Bell Ltd., Nairobi, Kenya.
- Captain Clement Holland, Superintendent, Industrial School, Bahamas.
- The Reverend Canon Lackland Augustus Lennon. For services to education and agriculture in Nigeria.
- George William Lines, Colonial Agricultural Service, Agricultural Officer, Nigeria.
- Alick Harold Maw. For public services in Nyasaland.
- Dost Mohamed, First Grade Clerk, Provincial Administration, Tanganyika Territory.
- The Reverend Clarence Ebenezer Victor Nathanielsz, Charity Commissioner, Public Assistance Department, Colombo Municipality, Ceylon.
- Donald Obeyesekere. For public services in Ceylon.
- Joseph James William Sneddon. For social welfare work in Trinidad.
- John William Terrington, Operating Superintendent, Kenya & Uganda Railways & Harbours Administration.
- Margaret Trowell. For services to African arts and crafts.
- Helen Bertha Waller, Mistress, European Education Department, Northern Rhodesia.
- Mary Millar Walmsley. For social welfare work in Kenya.
- Alice Walton, Colonial Nursing Service, Matron, Kingston Public Hospital, Jamaica.
- John Lionel Airey Watson, City Engineer, Haifa Municipality, Palestine.

Honorary Members

- Dimitri Farradj, Administrative Officer, Palestine.
- Joseph Kuperman, Administrative Officer, Palestine.
- Selim Yusef Beshara, Mayor of Nazareth, Palestine.
- Abbas Pasha Mirza, Mutessarrif, Ajlun District, Trans-Jordan.

=== Order of the Companions of Honour (CH) ===
- The Right Honourable Frederick James, Baron Woolton, DL.

=== Companion of the Imperial Service Order (ISO) ===
Home Civil Service

- Richard Bloore, MBE, Deputy Passport Officer, Foreign Office.
- Alan Cameron, Controller, Edinburgh Postal & Telegraph District, General Post Office.
- James Arthur Clarke, Chief Superintendent, Mercantile Marine Office, Ministry of War Transport, Newcastle.
- James Alexander Cole, Senior Chief Inspector, Ministry of Education, Northern Ireland.
- William Hubert Ekins, Principal, Ministry of Supply.
- Alexander Blaeburg Garrard, Assistant Head of Branch, General Register Office, Ministry of Health.
- Ivie Douglas Gemmell, Finance Officer and Accountant, Department of Agriculture for Scotland.
- William Archibald Girvin, Waterguard Superintendent, 2nd Class, Board of Customs & Excise.
- Herbert Charles Grange, Senior Executive Officer, Department of Overseas Trade.
- George Herbert Green, Principal Examiner, Patent Office, Board of Trade.
- Robert Harper, MBE, Superintendent of Land Charges and Agricultural Credits Department, Land Registry.
- Allan William Old, Chief Clerk, Exchequer Office, Scotland.
- Barton Morting Robinson, Senior Staff Officer, Air Ministry.
- Herbert Frederick Shave, Senior Examiner, Board of Inland Revenue.
- Russell Edwin Stanley, MBE, Principal, Ministry of Agriculture & Fisheries.
- Theophilus William Warrell, Senior Staff Officer, Home Office.
- Albert Harold Joseph Watson, MBE, Assistant Director of Stores, Admiralty.
- Sidney Herbert Wisdom, FIA, Senior Principal Clerk, Ministry of Pensions.

Dominion Civil Services

- James Patrick Burnside, Chairman of the Supply & Tender Board, Chief Inspector of Factories & Steam Boilers, State of South Australia.
- Stephen Bernard Dutton, lately Comptroller of Stores, Basutoland.

Indian Civil Services

- Anthony Cardozo, Officer Supervisor, Office of Chief Administrative Officer, Purchase Branch, Department of Supply, Government of India.
- Alfred Bertram Foster, Superintendent, Confidential Department, Civil Secretariat, United Provinces.
- William Edmund McMurray, Registrar, Education Department, Government of the Punjab.

Colonial Service

- Allen Bolton Campbell, Accountant, British Guiana.
- George Davis Goode, Chief Clerk, Department of Science & Agriculture, and Personal Secretary to the Director of Agriculture, Jamaica.
- Bismarck Halligey Johnson, Senior Accountant, Marine Department, Nigeria.
- Harold Pietersz William Melder, Office Assistant, Matale Kachcheri, Ceylon.
- Marie Francis Edgar Perombelon, Colonial Postal Service, Postmaster-General, Mauritius.
- Mohamed Yasouf Sanusi, Staff Superintendent, Sierra Leone.
- Alexander John Shellish, Colonial Postal Service, Postmaster-General, Cyprus.
- Arthur William Donald Skinner, Colonial Administrative Service, Assistant Colonial Secretary, Gold Coast.
- James Cyril Wirekoon, Assistant Director of Education, Ceylon.

=== Imperial Service Medal ===
- Shaik Esmail Shaik Emamuddin, Chobdar, Development Department, Bombay.
- Sheikh Kifayat Ullah, Head Jemadar Chaprasi, Orissa.
- Asun Rangkhol, Head Interpreter, North Cachar Hills, Assam.

=== Kaisar-i-Hind Gold Medal ===
For public services in India

- Mary Theresa, Lady Herbert (Wife of Sir John Herbert, GCIE, Governor of Bengal).
- Clare de Burgh Dening (Wife of Major-General Roland Dening, CB, MVO, MC, General Officer Commanding, Peshawar District), North-West Frontier Province.
- Hilda Mary Lazarus, Women's Medical Service for India, Principal, Lady Hardinge Medical College, Delhi.
- Ida Mary Roberts, MD, Medical Officer in charge of the American Hospital for Women & Children, Madura, Madras.
- Durani Warburton, Kasauli, Punjab.
- Amulya Chandra Ukil, MB, Senior Honorary Visiting Physician, Chest Department, Medical College Hospitals, Calcutta, Bengal.

==== Bar to the Kaisar-i-Hind Gold Medal ====
- Christian Frederik Frimodt-Moller, CBE, Medical Commissioner, Tuberculosis Association of India.

=== British Empire Medal (BEM) ===
Military Division

Royal Navy

- Chief Petty Officer Arthur Henry Carter, P/J.33956.
- Chief Petty Officer William George Cave, D/J.2229.
- Chief Petty Officer Francis Douglas Tom Hodges, P/J.579.
- Chief Petty Officer William Hutton, C/J.41627.
- Chief Petty Officer John Valentine Lovell, P/JX.134550.
- Chief Petty Officer William Haslam Manners, P/J.109276.
- Chief Petty Officer Arthur Edward Morant, P/J.194630.
- Chief Petty Officer Thomas James Munson, C./J.67840.
- Chief Petty Officer William George Richardson, P/J.75819
- Chief Petty Officer Edward Andrew Stote, D/J.48389.
- Chief Petty Officer Archibald George Warden Waters, C/J.11358.
- Chief Petty Officer Albert Richard Watters, D/JX.I63747.
- Chief Petty Officer Ernest Frederick Wheeler, P/J.103887.
- Acting Chief Petty Officer William Arthur John Croom, C/J.104578.
- Chief Yeoman of Signals Alfred James Cooper, C/J.19616.
- Chief Yeoman of Signals Ralph Charles Fuller, C/J.109411.
- Chief Petty Officer Telegraphist Rupert Douglas Brown, D/J.36251.
- Chief Petty Officer Telegraphist George Gamblin, C/J.111403.
- Chief Petty Officer Telegraphist Ancil Robert Granville Molton, D/J.48226.
- Chief Engine Room Artificer Andrew Brunton, C/M.26914.
- Chief Engine Room Artificer William Alexander Burden, C/M.38758.
- Chief Engine Room Artificer Richard Robert Gauntlett, P/M.34487.
- Chief Engine Room Artificer Thomas Henry Horsley, C/M.1368.
- Chief Engine Room Artificer Albert William Charles Manley, D/MX.45274.
- Chief Engine Room Artificer Olaff Lawrence Martin Matson, P/MX.59410.
- Chief Engine Room Artificer Charles Henry Norsworthy, D/M.37664.
- Chief Engine Room Artificer Leslie Harold Page, D/M.34929.
- Chief Engine Room Artificer Francis George Short, D/M.39462.
- Chief Engine Room Artificer Alfred Reginald Woodley, D/M.36174.
- Chief Stoker William Frederick Marsh, C/K.56608.
- Chief Stoker Herbert Frederick McKain, N.Z.D.437, Royal New Zealand Navy.
- Chief Electrical Artificer Francis William Vernon Barrett, D/MX.47065.
- Chief Electrical Artificer Leonard Robert Grove, C.347548.
- Chief Ordnance Artificer Harold Raymond Beale, D/M.36178.
- Chief Ordnance Artificer James McLean, C/MX.46089.
- Chief Ordnance Artificer Albert Victor Wiles, C/M.35567.
- Chief Ordnance Artificer William Alfred Williams, D/M.37235.
- Chief Shipwright Sidney Carah Allen, D/MX.53555.
- Chief Shipwright Albert Edward Taply Cook, C/M.35370.
- Sick Berth Chief Petty Officer John George Cumber, C/M.396.
- Sick Berth Chief Petty Officer Fred Courtenay Tonkin, P/M.2934.
- Chief Petty Officer Writer Arthur Thomas Gilbert McCall, P/346679.
- Chief Petty Officer Writer James Rowe, C/MX.47878.
- Chief Petty Officer Writer Philip Wild, P/MX.46822.
- Supply Chief Petty Officer Albert John Lamborn, D/M.372O3.
- Supply Chief Petty Officer John Francis Whitehead, P/MX.45094, Royal New Zealand Navy.
- Master-at-Arms Frederick Donald Ballard, P/M.39657.
- Master-at-Arms Frederick Andrew Bicknell, D/M.39643.
- Master-at-Arms Arthur William Dicker, C/M.36389.
- Master-at-Arms John Chard Seagrove, P/M.39677
- Master-at-Arms Arthur Albert Wattle, RAN.10921.
- Chief Petty Officer Cook George Norcutt, C/M.37427.
- Quartermaster Sergeant Instructor Philip Joseph Lawrence Allum, Po.22819, Royal Marines.
- Acting Temporary Company Sergeant Major William Joseph Henry Garrard, Po.X.323, Royal Marines.
- Colour Sergeant Alexander Clydesdale Wilkie, Po.19622, Royal Marines.
- Acting Temporary Colour Sergeant Archibald Frederick Merckel, Po.216927, Royal Marines.
- Acting Temporary Colour Sergeant Herbert Edward Mullins, Po.22390, Royal Marines.
- Flight Sergeant Sydney Herbert Lonsdale, 562770, Royal Air Force.
- Chief Wren Marie Winifred Hastings, 977, Women's Royal Naval Service.
- Flight Sergeant Enid Vaughan, 892573, Women's Auxiliary Air Force.
- Engine Room Artificer First Class Albert James Blatchford, D/MX.49598.
- Engine Room Artificer First Class John Cole, C/M.35278.
- Engine Room Artificer First Class Kenneth Hayne, P/MX.46891.
- Engine Room Artificer First Class Stanley Reginald Morgan, D/M.11048.
- Acting Engine Room Artificer Fourth Class Harry Brewer, D/MX.74193.
- Electrical Artificer Third Class Bertie James Sanders, D/MX.55988.
- Petty Officer Stanley Ellis, P/JX.146228.
- Petty Officer James Glass Saunders, C/JX.128654.
- Petty Officer Robert Simpson, D/J.109944.
- Petty Officer Joshua Channon Thompson, D/JX.229607.
- Petty Officer Telegraphist Frederick James Henry Mears, P/J.106242.
- Petty Officer Telegraphist Herbert Samuel White, P/J.40323.
- Stoker Petty Officer William Greaves, C/K.55960.
- Supply Petty Officer Francis Kingsley Watts, D/MX.47155.
- Petty Officer Steward Caetano Francisco de Lima, Goa.360967.
- Petty Officer Steward Harry Ernest Redman, P/L.15030.
- Petty Officer Rigger James William Spiller, P/JX.166547.
- Temporary Acting Leading Seaman Stanley Wright, D/SSX.18500.
- Temporary Acting Leading Stoker Frank William Legate, C/KX.92883.
- Leading Air Fitter Peter Allen, FAA/FX.81043.
- Leading Writer James McIllwraith, CD/X.1235, Royal Naval Volunteer Reserve.
- Leading Wireman Harold Douglas French, D/JX.168308.
- Leading Steward Emmanuel Micaleff, E/L.11632.
- Able Seaman Lionel George Andrews, P/JX.153810.
- Able Seaman Thomas Henry Bailey, D/J.96396.
- Able Seaman Stephen Leonard Bell, D/SSX.21171.
- Able Seaman Wallace Ferguson, D/J.38457.
- Able Seaman Leonard James Tilney, C/JX.126055.
- Able Seaman Wilford Watmough, C/J.109128.
- Stoker First Class John Charles Hughes, C/K.64115.
- Stoker Cyril Benson Ross, Royal Naval Special Reserve, 50413.
- Temporary Corporal Ernest Edward Ashford, Po/X.1875, Royal Marines.
- Marine Ernest Joseph Smith, Ply.E21093, Royal Marines.
- Marine James Brownlee, Ply.X.3965, Royal Marines.

Army

- No. 4747047 Private Charles Aspinall, The York and Lancaster Regiment.
- No. 2649079 Colour-Sergeant (Company Quarter-Master-Sergeant) William Comes, Coldstream Guards.
- No. 1437004 Battery-Quarter-Master-Sergeant (local Warrant Officer Class II Regimental Quarter-Master-Sergeant) William John Driver, Royal Artillery.
- No. S/107345 Sergeant William John Hawkes, Royal Army Service Corps.
- No. 2092594 Lance-Corporal Leonard John Knott, Royal Engineers.
- No. 7609799 Staff-Sergeant Raymond Herbert Maddocks, Royal Army Ordnance Corps.
- No. 6408 Lance-Corporal Joseph Mallia, King's Own Malta Regiment.
- No. 824875 Sergeant (acting Staff-Sergeant) (Artillery Clerk) Alexander McCaw, Royal Artillery.
- No. 1904899 Sergeant George New, DCM, MM, Royal Engineers.
- No. 882827 Sergeant Thomas Rawlings Potts, Royal Artillery (now Warrant Officer Class II, Battery Sergeant-Major).
- No. S/80732 Staff-Sergeant George Martin Richardson, Royal Army Service Corps.
- Lance-Corporal John William Scott, Home Guard.
- No. 2583603 Corporal Joseph William Symonds, Royal Corps of Signals.
- No. 2200932 Sergeant Ronald Archibald Thomas, Royal Artillery.
- No. 2579494 Sergeant Kenneth Wickham Worlock, Royal Corps of Signals.

Royal Air Force

- 561676 Flight Sergeant George Joseph William Abraham.
- 560514 Flight Sergeant Thomas William Atkinson.
- 363344 Flight Sergeant Edgar William Belgrove.
- 352841 Flight. Sergeant Harold Blackburn.
- 562045 Flight Sergeant Leonard Edwin Cowan, DFM.
- 363073 Flight Sergeant Henry Forrest.
- 562532 Flight Sergeant William John Graham.
- 349167 Flight Sergeant Robert Lee Hoey.
- 366319 Flight Sergeant Ivor Norman Jones.
- 561286 Flight Sergeant Edward Herbert Leonard.
- 562209 Flight Sergeant Harry Jack Moule.
- 563673 Flight Sergeant Charles Thomas Nicholls.
- 363326 Flight Sergeant Frederick Thomas Salmon.
- 510958 Flight Sergeant Frederick Smith.
- 353409 Flight Sergeant Norman Watson.
- 516087 Sergeant William Richard Jones.
- 205246 Sergeant Harry Kinsela Pask.
- 811136 Corporal Robert Edward Butler, Auxiliary Air Force.
- 572804 Corporal Maxwell John Edmonds.
- 571114 Corporal Kelita Hall.
- 615225 Corporal Arthur Oliver Molson.
- 1063547 Corporal William Paul.
- 572402 Corporal Dennis Arthur Purser.
- 994894 Leading Aircraftman Harry Beesley.
- 937162 Leading Aircraftman Horace Burke.
- 648662 Leading Aircraftman James Murphy.
- 370709 Leading Aircraftman Robert Stenhouse.
- 1107991 Aircraftman 1st Class David Russell Burton Browning.
- 881955 Flight Sergeant Ivy Lillian Millett, Women's Auxiliary Air Force.
- 881309 Flight Sergeant Jessie Mary. Shannon, Women's Auxiliary Air Force.
- 2091118 Leading Aircraftwoman Doris Margaret Nichol, Women's Auxiliary Air Force.

Civil Division

United Kingdom

- Frederick Abbatt, Able Seaman, Merchant Navy.
- Samanda Abdoola, Engine Room Serang, Merchant Navy.
- Ruckboth Ali, Deck Serang, Merchant Navy.
- William Lumsden Allardyce, Chief Works Foreman, De Havilland Aircraft Co. Ltd.
- James Alton, Head Office Inspector, London, Midland & Scottish Railway, Glasgow.
- Edward Ashcroft, Staff Officer to the Director of Rescue & Decontamination Services, Nottinghamshire.
- Harold Ashcroft, Quartermaster, Merchant Navy.
- Herbert Henry Bagshaw, Head Foreman, Vickers-Armstrongs Ltd., Southern Works.
- George Alfred Bailey, Boatswain, Merchant Navy.
- Frank William Ballard, Principal Foreman of Stores, No. 14 Maintenance Unit RAF, Royal Air Force.
- Frederick Banks, Chief Steward, Merchant Navy.
- Albert George Baxter, Steward, Merchant Navy.
- Angus Beaton, Skipper of a Motor-boat.
- Algar John Bedwell, Telegraphist, London North Telegraph Centre, General Post Office.
- Henry George Bennett, Area Inspector, Southern Railway.
- Hector Black, Inspector, Lanarkshire Police Force, Air Raid Precautions Co-ordinating Officer, Lanark County.
- Ralph Bland, Waste Engineer, Boulton Paul Aircraft Ltd.
- Maurice Samuel Boardman, Instructor, Royal Ordnance Factory, Ministry of Supply.
- Albert Bolten, Carpenter-Pumpman, Merchant Navy.
- Charles Brayley, Chargehand, The Manchester Dry Docks Co. Ltd.
- William Bridgehouse, Foreman Fitter, The Whitehead Torpedo Co. Ltd.
- William Frederick Charles Brogan, Able Seaman, Merchant Navy.
- William Brown, Chief Steward, Merchant Navy.
- William Henry Brown, Chargehand, Humber Ltd.
- Ralph Arthur Buckingham, Divisional Civil Defence Warden, Leicester.
- Harry James Burt, Supervisor of Heavy Structures, Southern Railway.
- Captain Douglas Walter Thomas Cain, Fire Guard Staff Officer, Chatham.
- Esmail Cassum, Deck Serang, Merchant Navy.
- Elizabeth Joyce Shillington Gather, Woman Auxiliary, London Fire Force, National Fire Service.
- Lee Hai Chang, Quartermaster, Merchant Navy.
- Charles Edward Christian, Chief Steward, Merchant Navy.
- Thomas Clarke, Carpenter, Merchant Navy.
- Charles Hedley Cooper, Fireman, Merchant Navy.
- George Cordwell, Permanent Way Inspector, Southern Railway.
- Leonard William Cottell, Town Sub-Postmaster, London.
- Joseph Jeremiah Cotter, Assistant to Chief Civil Defence Warden, Poplar.
- Thomas Walker Court, Boatswain, Merchant Navy.
- Horace Crossland, Chief Steward, Merchant Navy.
- David Blackwell Cummings, Station Engineer, Grade I, Air Ministry.
- Wallace Cundy, Able Seaman, Merchant Navy.
- William Cutler, Greaser, Merchant Navy.
- Sidney James Damsell, Foreman, Bristol Aeroplane Company Ltd., (Aero Engine (Production) Department).
- Charles Davies, Head Foreman Boilermaker, Messrs. Grayson, Rollo & Clover Docks Ltd.
- Harry David Day, Fire Guard Staff Officer, Reigate.
- Herbert Edward Day, Foreman of Milling Department, D. Napier & Son Ltd.
- Thirza Dempsey, Hostel Matron, Redruth.
- Albert John Dottrill, Machine Shop Foreman, Daimler Ltd.
- Reginald Vernon Dowler, Patrolman, Merchant Navy.
- Michael Thomas Driscoll, Foreman in charge of Hull Shop, Saunders-Roe Ltd.
- Gertrude Dunn, Woman Cook, Port of London Authority.
- Philip James Dunn, Carpenter-Pumpman, Merchant Navy.
- Arthur John Earley, Toolmaker, Westland Aircraft Ltd.
- Arthur Cyril Edwards, DCM, Acting Foreman, Messrs. Henry Meadows.
- Richard England, Inspector, Telephone Manager's Office, Lowestoft.
- Thomas Entwistle, Foreman Millwright, Armstrong Siddeley Motors Ltd.
- Frank Evans, Signals and Telegraph Supervisor, Southern Railway.
- Morgan Evans, Senior Overlooker, Royal Ordnance Factory, Ministry of Supply.
- Thomas Fallen, Chief Inspector, Metropolitan Police.
- Tom Foster Farmery, Able Seaman, Merchant Navy.
- Emily Field, Voluntary School Care Committee Worker, London.
- William Charles Finnern, Class "A" Observer, Southern Area, Royal Observer Corps.
- Albert Ernest Fisher, Chief Foreman, Great Western Railway Goods Depot, South Lambeth.
- Elizabeth Fisher, Senior Chargehand, J. E. Baxter & Co. Ltd.
- William Alfred Fisher, Foreman Rigger, Channel Dry Dock Company.
- Albert Fletcher, Messenger, Admiralty.
- Insoector Patrick Fletcher, Dundee Police Force. Assistant Air Raid Precautions Training Officer, Dundee.
- Frederick Ford, Organiser of Civil Defence Messenger Service (Cyclists), Bristol.
- William Forrester, Boatswain, Merchant Navy.
- Amelia Jane Foster, Supervisor, Toll Telephone Exchange, Manchester.
- George Henry Foster, Civil Defence Sector Warden, Plymouth.
- Winifred Wast Fovargue, Honorary Organiser of the Civil Nursing Reserve in the County Borough of Eastbourne.
- William Edward Franklin, Company Officer, No. 12 Fire Force Area, National Fire Service.
- James Fraser, Foreman Caulker, Messrs. Fleming & Ferguson.
- Henry Frend, Quartermaster, Merchant Navy.
- John James Freshwater, Telegraph Ganger, London Midland & Scottish Railway.
- Arthur William Garrard, Civil Defence Post Warden, Lambeth.
- David George Garrett, Foreman Shipwright, Messrs. C. H. Bailey Ltd.
- Frederick Arthur Gent, Civil Defence Incident Officer, Derbyshire.
- Charles Henry Gibbins, Part-time Company Officer, National Fire Service.
- George Gillingham, Chief Dock Foreman, Great Western Railway, Barry Docks.
- Frederick William Arthur Goodchild, Fireman, British Overseas Airways Corporation.
- Charles Henry Goody, Auxiliary Fireman, Despatch Rider, London Fire Force, National Fire Service.
- Joseph Stanley Gould, Inspector, Telephone Exchange, Haverfordwest, Pembrokeshire.
- George William Goulden, Electrician, Merchant Navy.
- Alexander Griffin, Carpenter in charge of Launching Squad, Greenock Dockyard Company Ltd.
- Leonard William Hall, Turner, English Steel Corporation Ltd.
- Jim Hamment, Sample Passer, English Steel Corporation Ltd, Vickers Works, Sheffield.
- Richard Eustace Handforth, Boatswain, Merchant Navy.
- James Hanmore, Quartermaster, Merchant Navy.
- William George Harding, Head of General Cargo Section, Great Western Railway, Newport.
- Edward Stanley Harris, Head Observer, Western Area, Royal Observer Corps (Major, late Royal Field Artillery).
- Charles Heathcote, Tool and Gauge Maker, Royal Ordnance Factory, Ministry of Supply.
- Charles Hellyar, Fireman, Merchant Navy.
- Walter George Hempstead, Able Seaman, Merchant Navy.
- George Henderson, Sorting Clerk and Telegraphist (Postal), Head Post Office, Edinburgh.
- Lawrence Higham, Chargehand Erector, Vickers-Armstrongs Ltd.
- Edith Charlotte Kindle, Supervisor, Telephone Exchange, Bradford.
- James Gilbert Hobbs, Inspector, Engineer-in-Chief's Office, General Post Office.
- William Henry Hobbs, Training Officer, Bristol Casualty Services.
- William Lee Hogg, Part-time Firemaster, Haddington Fire Brigade.
- John Hughes, Boatswain, Merchant Navy.
- Percy William Hughes, Chief Steward, Merchant Navy.
- Henry Thomas Hull, Woodworking Superintendent, Phillips & Powis Aircraft Ltd.
- Edward Hunt, Fireman, Merchant Navy.
- Edwin Thomas John Inch, Chief Steward, Merchant Navy.
- John Godfrey Jacobsen, Boatswain, Merchant Navy.
- Walter Henry James, Station Engineer, Grade I, Air Ministry, Middle East.
- Olive Johnson, Matron, Cherryhinton Children's Hostel.
- Joseph John Henry Jones, Storekeeper, Merchant Navy.
- Malcolm Jones, Chief Steward, Merchant Navy.
- John Keen, Carpenter, Merchant Navy.
- Henry George King, Boiler Maker, Merchant Navy.
- Edmund Osric Edgar Lander, Office Keeper, Home Office and Ministry of Home Security.
- Tohn Larkin, Boatswain, Merchant Navy.
- Cecil Lauze, Chief Steward, Merchant Navy.
- Anthony King Laverton, Maintenance Engineer, Gloster Aircraft Co. Ltd.
- Gaston Victor Leverett, Foreman, Aveling-Barford Ltd.
- Cecil Herbert Lockyer, Skilled Workman, Class I, General Post Office, Southampton.
- Charles Logan, Carpenter, Merchant Navy.
- Leonard Evelyn Lowings, Company Officer, No. 30 Fire Force Area, National Fire Service.
- Harry Lyne, Unestablished Postman, Beckenham.
- Alexander McLeod McCormack, Dockmaster and Foreman Shipwright, Barclay Curie & Co. Ltd.
- Lewis Macdonald, First Engineer of a Steam Trawler.
- Donald McLean, Seaman, Merchant Navy.
- Alexander McMillan, Carpenter, Merchant Navy.
- Roderick McNeil, Boatswain, Merchant Navy.
- Charles Maidment, Donkeyman, Merchant Navy.
- Frances Minnie Markham, Factory Forewoman, Post Office Factories Department, Birmingham.
- Charles George Marshall, Foreman, Great Western Railway, Cardiff Docks.
- John Marshall, Chargehand Caulker, Messrs. D. & W. Henderson Ltd.
- William Marshall, Chief Baker, Merchant Navy.
- John Hall Martin, Manager of Web Department, Messrs. Topp & Hindley Ltd.
- William Robinson Martin, Boatswain, Merchant Navy.
- William Henry Mathews, Police Sergeant, Glamorgan County Constabulary.
- Munshed Meath, Deck Serang, Merchant Navy.
- William Ernest Mee, Chief Foreman of Metal Detail Department, The Bristol Aeroplane Co. Ltd. (Aircraft Works).
- George Meehan, Chief Engineer of a Steam Trawler.
- George Michie, Inspector, Aberdeenshire Police Force.
- George Arthur Minshall, Permanent Way Inspector, Southern Railway.
- Arthur Mitchell, Baker, Merchant Navy.
- Albert Thomas Morgan, Driver, Civil Defence First Aid Party, Birmingham.
- Samuel Morgan, Carpenter, Merchant Navy.
- Donald Munro, Crane-man, Traffic Department, Clyde Navigation Trust.
- Peter Murray, Mate of a Steam Drifter.
- George Nettleton, Chief Engineer of a Steam Trawler.
- James William Nicholson, Chargehand Fitter, Messrs. Vickers-Armstrongs Ltd.
- Joseph Noble, Foreman Shipwright, Palmers Hebburn Co. Ltd.
- John Oddy, Foundry Foreman, Austin Motor Company Ltd.
- Harold James Pallister, Overseer, Air Ministry Wireless Station.
- James Bell Patterson, Foreman of the Flight Shed, Short & Harland Ltd.
- Margaret Doris Phillips, Machinist, Royal Ordnance Factory, Ministry of Supply.
- Sidney George Phillips, Chief Steward, Merchant Navy.
- John Plant, Senior Subordinate Instructor, Ministry of Home Security School, Falfield.
- Frank Pyatt, Night Foreman, Standard Motor Company Ltd.
- William Robinson Raistrick, Steward, Merchant Navy.
- Edwin George Read, Locomotive Inspector, Southern Railway.
- George James Reardon, Boatswain, Merchant Navy.
- Mary Redman, Forewoman, Edward Curran & Co. Ltd.
- James Reid, Leading Furnaceman, William Beardmore & Company Ltd.
- Clive George Ridyard, East Divisional Assistant Civil Defence Warden, Southampton.
- Alice Mary Rigby, Assistant Supervisor, Class II, Private Branch Telephone Exchange, War Office.
- Edgar Riley, Toolmaker, The English Electric Company Ltd.
- Arthur Capell Roberts, Chief Inspector, Permanent Way Section, London Passenger Transport Board.
- William James Rogers, Chief Bedroom Steward, Merchant Navy.
- Abdool Rohoman, Engine Room Serang, Merchant Navy.
- Edgar Royston, Deputy County Ambulance Officer, Essex County Council.
- Arthur Rundle, Scientific Instrument Maker, Ross Ltd.
- Ahmid Mahomid Sallia, Second Fireman's Tindal, Merchant Navy.
- Albert Edward Sanderson, Donkeyman, Merchant Navy.
- William Sargent, Chief Carpenter, Merchant Navy.
- George Shaw, Wireless Telegraphy Watchkeeper, Air Ministry Outstation.
- Ngay ah Sik, Boatswain, Merchant Navy.
- Lillian Gertrude Silvernie, Press Tool Setter, Vickers-Armstrongs Ltd.
- Hjalmar Sjoholm, Boatswain, Merchant Navy.
- Thomas Sloan, MM, Skipper of a Motor-boat.
- Henry Slowe, Donkeyman, Merchant Navy.
- Andrew Smith, Civil Defence Depot Rescue Officer, Westminster.
- Arthur Ernest Smith, Shop Foreman (Acting), No. 19 Maintenance Unit RAF, Ministry of Aircraft Production.
- John Henry Smith, Sub-Postmaster, Hull, Yorkshire.
- John William Smith, Chief Inspector of Postmen, Head Post Office, Birmingham.
- Robert Smith, Foreman Plater, Messrs. Denny Brothers.
- William Johnstone Smith, Foreman Plumber, Messrs. Harland & Wolff Ltd.
- George Fenech Soler, Senior Engineer, British Overseas Airways Corporation, Malta.
- Cecil John Speed, Acting Chief Architectural Assistant, Borough Engineer's Department, Southampton.
- George Henry Springer, Chief Engineer of a Steam Trawler.
- Maria Jane Emily Sturgeon, Assistant Safety Officer, Imperial Chemical Industries (Fertilisers & Synthetic Products) Ltd.
- William Swankie, Skipper of a Motor-boat.
- Henry William Tagg, Permanent Way Inspector, Southern Railway.
- William Charles Thurston, Able Seaman, Merchant Navy.
- Lewis Edward Trevers, Officer in charge, Civil Defence Rescue Party, Bradfield Rural District, Berkshire.
- Thomas Turnbull, Civil Defence Training Officer, County of Selkirk.
- Dorothy Alice Tyler, Ambulance Driver, Bromley.
- Albert Stanley Venn, Turner, Royal Ordnance Factory, Ministry of Supply.
- George Charles Vetcher, First Bedroom Steward, Merchant Navy.
- Thomas Waitt, Carpenter, Merchant Navy.
- William Ernest Walker, Crane Driver, King George's Dock, Hull.
- Charles Henry Ward, Assistant Storekeeper, Merchant Navy.
- George Watson, Foreman, Experimental Shop, Blackburn Aircraft Ltd.
- George Ernest Watson, Chief Officer, Class I, HM Prison Brixton.
- William James Watson, Office Keeper, Ministry of War Transport.
- Hilda Lilian Watts, Auxiliary Station Officer, London County Council Ambulance Service, Battersea.
- John Edgar Webb, Foreman Boilermaker, Prince of Wales Dry Dock Company.
- Arthur Frank West, Senior Foreman, Short Brothers Seaplane Works.
- John White, Fireman, Merchant Navy.
- Joan Whitehouse, Women's Voluntary Services Centre Organiser for Cannock Urban District.
- Neil Whyte, Carpenter, Merchant Navy.
- Stanley Wicks, Shop Foreman, No. 8 Maintenance Unit RAF, Ministry of Aircraft Production.

India

- Keki Byramji Godrej, Accountant, Indian Merchant Marine Training Ship Dufferin, Bombay.
- Syed Abdul Jalil, Officiating Tahsildar, Kaimganj, Farrukhabad District, United Provinces.
- Joseph Cyril Roche, Assistant in charge, Office of the Chief Controller of Imports, New Delhi.
- Mirza Basharat Husain Beg, Jailor, District Jail, Unao, United Provinces.

Colonies, Protectorates, etc.

- Percy John Rostance, First Class Foreman, Public Works Department, Fiji.
- Frederick Leon Smith, Carpenter, Public Works Department, Fiji.
- Panalal Kapoor, Senior Yard Foreman, Nairobi, Kenya and Uganda Railways and Harbours.
- Maganhai Javerbhai Patel, Senior Yard Foreman, Nairobi, Kenya and Uganda Railways and Harbours.

=== Distinguished Service Order (DSO) ===
Royal Navy

- Captain William Scott Bardwell, MVO, (Retd).
- Captain Colin Alexander Gordon Hutchison, (Retd).
- Commander Walter Thomas Couchman, OBE.

=== Distinguished Service Cross (DSC) ===
Royal Navy

- Commander Edmund Mount Haes.
- Acting Commander William Hugh Moloney.
- Acting Temporary Commander Sidney Peck Herival, OBE, Royal Naval Volunteer Reserve.
- Lieutenant-Commander Alan Francis Black, (Retd).
- Lieutenant-Commander Vernon North Graves.
- Lieutenant-Commander Ronald Stanley Howlett.
- Lieutenant-Commander Reginald Horace Johnson.
- Lieutenant-Commander Eric Norman Walmsley.
- Lieutenant-Commander Alfred Ernest Willmott, Royal Naval Reserve.
- Lieutenant-Commander Gordon Bridson, Royal New Zealand Naval Volunteer Reserve.
- Lieutenant-Commander John George Hilliard, Royal New Zealand Naval Volunteer Reserve.
- Acting Temporary Lieutenant-Commander Charles Ernest Davies, Royal Naval Reserve.
- Lieutenant John Arthur Stanley Davey.
- Lieutenant Brian Desmond Gallie.
- Lieutenant Henry Kirkwood.
- Lieutenant John Douglas David Moore.
- Temporary Lieutenant John William Ailwyn Jones, Royal Naval Reserve.
- Lieutenant Henry Owen L'Estrange, Royal Naval Reserve.
- Temporary Lieutenant Denis Malet Lambert, Royal Naval Reserve.
- Temporary Lieutenant John Stanley Roe, Royal Naval Reserve.
- Lieutenant Peter Birkett Hague, Royal Naval Volunteer Reserve.
- Lieutenant William Sinclair Macdonald, Royal Naval Volunteer Reserve.
- Temporary Lieutenant Edward George Antony Bell, Royal Naval Volunteer Reserve.
- Temporary Lieutenant George Henry Clark, Royal Naval Volunteer Reserve.
- Temporary Lieutenant Henry Leonard Choppin, Royal Naval Volunteer Reserve.
- Temporary Lieutenant George Clifford Fanner, Royal Naval Volunteer Reserve.
- Temporary Lieutenant Leonard Henry Hill, Royal Naval Volunteer Reserve.
- Temporary Lieutenant Frederick Cecil Mascall, Royal Naval Volunteer Reserve.
- Temporary Lieutenant Alan Robert Mitchell, Royal Naval Volunteer Reserve.
- Temporary Lieutenant Malcolm Campbell Waylen, Royal Naval Volunteer Reserve.
- Temporary Lieutenant John Mortimer Davies, Royal Canadian Naval Volunteer Reserve.
- Lieutenant (E) Aubrey Richard Moore.
- Temporary Lieutenant (E) James Douglas Percy.
- Acting Skipper Lieutenant James Thomson White, 2780.W.S, Royal Naval Reserve.
- Acting Temporary Skipper Lieutenant George Alfred Whichello, 217T.S, Royal Naval Reserve.
- Temporary Skipper Frederick Sydney Johnson, 223T.S, Royal Naval Reserve.
- Temporary Skipper Reginald Robert Russell, 326T.S, Royal Naval Reserve.
- Temporary Skipper Donald Helenio Ward, 404T.S, Royal Naval Reserve.
- Sub-Lieutenant Peter Morton Wilcockson, Royal Naval Reserve.
- Temporary Sub-Lieutenant (A) Alan Michael Tritton, Royal Naval Volunteer Reserve.
- Mr. Thomas Benson Garnett, Commissioned Engineer.
- Mr. Edward Garnall Jenkinson, Commissioned Engineer.
- Mr. Ernest Alfred Aguzzi, Gunner.
- Mr. Jesse Philip Rathbone, Gunner (T).

==== Bar to the Distinguished Service Cross ====
- Lieutenant John Charles Grattan, DSC, Royal Navy.

=== Distinguished Service Medal (DSM) ===
Royal Navy

- Chief Petty Officer Frederick Bird, P/J.18522.
- Chief Petty Officer John Brearley, D/J.83828.
- Chief Petty Officer John Christie Burnet, D/J.101300.
- Chief Petty Officer Walter Henry Homewood, P/J.111612.
- Chief Petty Officer Bernard Leslie Maddock, D/J.108776.
- Chief Petty Officer William Maydwell, D/J.29144.
- Chief Petty Officer Andrew Mortimer, C/JX.125376.
- Chief Petty Officer James Stephen Seaman, C/J.3192.
- Chief Petty Officer John Stephen Silby, C/J. 100298.
- Chief Yeoman of Signals William Munro, P/JX.128928.
- Chief Yeoman of Signals George Alfred Toon, D/J.32877.
- Chief Engine Room Artificer James Bennett Bourke, P/M.34825.
- Chief Engine Room Artificer Albert James Martin Chambers, C/M.34468.
- Chief Engine Room Artificer Maurice William Tanner, C/M.37037.
- Chief Engine Room Artificer Cyril Leighton Yarwood, C/M.35056.
- Acting Chief Engine Room Artificer Norman Frederick Biddlecombe, D/MX.51435.
- Chief Mechanician Stephen William Snelling, C/K.18995.
- Chief Stoker Henry Alexander Brooks, D/K.64576.
- Chief Stoker Walter William Jasper, C/K.63647.
- Chief Stoker William John Edward Pruett, D/KX.76477.
- Chief Stoker Charles Frederick Stevens, P/K.5461.
- Chief Ordnance Artificer William Hall Akers, D/M.36688.
- Chief Engineman Thomas Kimpson, LT/KX.110649, Royal Naval Patrol Service.
- Chief Engineman Sidney Wells, L/KX.108332, Royal Naval Patrol Service.
- Engine Room Artificer Third Class Gerald Cecil Collins, P/MX.48679.
- Engine Room Artificer Third Class Owen Lloyd Thomas, D/MX.51446.
- Acting- Engine Room Artificer Fourth Class Albert George Messenger, P/MX.56231.
- Electrical Artificer First Class Albert Edward Ford, C/M.35416.
- Ordnance Artificer First Class Philip Thomas McGrath, C/M.36681.
- Sergeant William Herbert Holbrook, 335602, Royal Air Force.
- Petty Officer Robert Ernest Clements, C/JX.126010.
- Petty Officer Cecil Ernest Paul, P/JX.166288.
- Acting Petty Officer Derek Arthur James Bright, C/JX.134603.
- Acting Petty Officer David Shirra McGilvray, D/SSX.15623.
- Petty Officer Airman Arthur Jopling, FAA/FX.79821.
- Petty Officer Airman Albert William Sabey, FAA/FX.76465.
- Yeoman of Signals Charles Skelton Stanford, D/JX.131923.
- Acting Yeoman of Signals Ronald Frederick William Winter, P/JX.136084.
- Petty Officer Telegraphist Charles Beecroft, C/J.108264.
- Petty Officer Telegraphist Vincent Brennan, D/JX.133174.
- Petty Officer Telegraphist Cecil Harry Claridge, D/JX.133951.
- Petty Officer Telegraphist Cyril Haisell, C/J.90931.
- Petty Officer Telegraphist Arthur John Harrington, D/JX.136120.
- Petty Officer Telegraphist Norman William Harris, F/JX.137191.
- Temporary Acting Stoker Petty Officer Kenneth William John Rudge, D/KX.83517.
- Second Hand William Jarvie Hall, LT/JX.190001, Royal Naval Patrol Service.
- Second Hand Alexander Murdo Kennedy, LT/X.191191, Royal Naval Reserve.
- Second Hand George Reginald Rope, LT/X.20573A, Royal Naval Reserve.
- Second Hand Meldrum Duncan Shipley, LT/X.10272B, Royal Naval Reserve.
- Second Hand Henry James Wink, LT/JX.195882, Royal Naval Patrol Service.
- Engineman Jack Oliver Blakelock, LT/KX.104251, Royal Naval Patrol Service.
- Engineman James Peter Thompson Dell, X.5914ES, Royal Naval Reserve.
- Engineman Richard Duncan, LT/KX.99968, Royal Naval Patrol Service.
- Engineman John William Foxcroft, LT.5909ES, Royal Naval Reserve.
- Engineman William Young, LT/KX.109767, Royal Naval Patrol Service.
- Temporary Petty Officer Cook Cecil Roy Smith, P/MX.51629.
- Leading Seaman Edward Henderson Barras, LT/KX.205464, Royal Naval Patrol Service.
- Leading Seaman John Henry Brett, C/JX.147905.
- Leading Seaman Arthur Chance, LT/JX.167049, Royal Naval Patrol Service.
- Leading Seaman Ernest Foster, P/236437.
- Leading Seaman Ronald John George, LT/X.18291A, Royal Naval Reserve.
- Leading Seaman Evan Ernest Morgan, C/SSX.16627.
- Leading Seaman Herbert Henry Parry, P/JX.128289.
- Leading Seaman Edward Robert Pitt, L.5704D, Royal Naval Reserve.
- Leading Seaman Donald Sinclair, LT/5585B, Royal Naval Reserve.
- Leading Seaman Robert Thomas Smith, C/J.41870.
- Leading Seaman Jack Henry Charles Turner, LT/JX.147005, Royal Naval Patrol Service.
- Leading Seaman Frederick William Turpin, P/J.97991.
- Leading Seaman Frederick Wingate, LT/JX.225539. Royal Naval Patrol Service.
- Acting Leading Seaman William Alfred Kirby, P/JX.148369.
- Leading Airman Norman Leslie, FAA/FX.79399.
- Leading Airman Frederick Ronald Rhodes Lowe, FAA/FX.79410.
- Leading Airman Ronald Stratford Saunders, FAA/SR.16177.
- Leading Air Fitter Bertie Edward Cawdron, FAA/FX.79767.
- Leading Air Fitter (E) Wilfred Jones, FAA/FX.75587.
- Acting Leading Telegraphist John Shipley Weir, D/JX.135107.
- Temporary Acting Leading Telegraphist Reginald Squelch, D/J.107214.
- Leading Stoker Frederick Thomas Newport, P/KX.86343.
- Leading Stoker Bernard Verdun Trueman, D/KX.88469.
- Leading Wireman Herbert Ambler, P/MX.64580.
- Able Seaman Harold Lucas Harris, D/J.106084.
- Able Seaman George Arthur Rapley, C/J.104029.
- Able Seaman Henry Yeoell, D/J.102036.
- Wireman James Thompson Nisbet, C/MX.68808.
- Wireman Smith Rapp, C/MX.71428.
- Wireman Frederick Rollason, P/MX.67502.
- Telegraphist Bernard Ostler Ralph Nicholson, P/SSX.17538.
- Signalman Philip Aldridge Bott, P/JX.199524.
- Convoy Signalman Russell Francis Charles Durbin, C/JX.226561.
- Stoker Frank George White, LT/KX.128291, Royal Naval Patrol Service.
- Seaman Raymond Arthur Charles Dean, LT/JX.175049, Royal Naval Patrol Service.
- Seaman Thomas Henry Gale, LT/JX.209137, Royal Naval Patrol Service.
- Seaman Robert Sproul, LT/JX.2O7738, Royal Naval Patrol Service.
- Seaman Stanley Ronald Wakefield, LT/JX.222734, Royal Naval Patrol Service.

==== Bar to the Distinguished Service Medal ====
Royal Navy

- Chief Engine Room Artificer Ralph Dixon Hall, DSM, C/M.11533.
- Chief Stoker Alfred Lawrence, DSM, P/K.61871.
- Petty Officer Francis George Keefe, DSM, C/JX.129342.

=== Royal Red Cross (RRC) ===
Queen Alexandra's Royal Naval Nursing Service

- Kathleen Minnie Atkinson, ARRC, Superintending Sister.

Queen Alexandra's Imperial Military Nursing Service

- Marion Delves, Matron (206104).
- Rose Gertrude Moffat, ARRC, Matron (206298).
- Dorothy Richardson, Matron (215270).
- Margaret Myllim Roberts, ARRC, Matron (206653) (Retd.)
- Maggie Bella Robertson, Matron (215281).
- Evelyn Mary Silkstone, Matron (206433).
- Elizabeth Dorothea Ann McHardy, Sister (acting Matron) (206292).
- Dora Granville Grayson, ARRC, Assistant Matron (208303).

Territorial Army Nursing Service

- Lucy Gwendoline Duff Grant, Principal Matron,
- Edith Olive Jackson, Principal Matron, Territorial Army Nursing Service.
- Eleanor E. Hughes, Matron (213478), Territorial Army Nursing Service.

==== Associate of the Royal Red Cross (ARRC) ====
Queen Alexandra's Royal Naval Nursing Service

- Olga Heather Franklin, MBE, Superintending Sister.
- Phyllis Lucy Shipton, Acting Superintending Sister.
- Elizabeth Alice Mary Maunsell, Nursing Sister.
- Marion Ruby Hill, Reserve Nursing Sister.
- Kathleen Eva Bogue, Reserve Nursing Sister.

Voluntary Aid Detachment

- Frances Ada Bailey, Nursing Member.
- Beatrice Evelyn Phillimore, Nursing Member.
- Josephine Elspeth Janet Black, Nursing Member.
- Ethel Roseveare, Nursing Member.
- Linda Matilda Mills, Nursing Member.

Queen Alexandra's Imperial Military Nursing Service

- Marjorie Birdsall, Assistant Matron (206033).
- Ellinor Humphreys Owen, Assistant Matron (206357).
- Irene Annie Elizabeth Caldwell, Sister (acting Matron) (206109).
- Ellen Curwen, Sister (acting Matron) (206102).
- Phyllis Eva Wilkins, Sister-in-Charge (206523).

Queen Alexandra's Imperial Military Nursing Service Reserve

- Grace Christabel Belcher, Sister-in-Charge (206629).
- Mary Gertrude Cardine Heathcote, Sister-in-Charge (208444).
- Annie Kennedy, Sister (208039).
- Nora Ellen Newton, Sister (208949).

Princess Mary's Royal Air Force Nursing Service

- Acting Senior Sister Hilda Adams.
- Acting Senior Sister Ethel Winifred Griffiths.
- Acting Senior Sister Joan Mallalieu Mallalieu.
- Acting Senior Sister Jessie Winifred Rogers.
- Acting Senior Sister Edna Mabel Tilbrook.
- Acting Senior Sister Roberta Mary Whyte.
- Sister Mary McCallum.

=== Military Cross (MC) ===
Royal Air Force

- Flight Lieutenant Alan Graham Douglas (41387).

=== Air Force Cross (AFC) ===
- Group Captain Philip Clermont Livingston, OBE.
- Wing Commander John Charles Macdonald, DFC, (26183).
- Wing Commander Hubert Pelham Simpson, MM, AFM, (31098).
- Wing Commander Walter Peter Whitworth (36039).
- Wing Commander Ronald Hildyard Young (32214).
- Acting Wing Commander Roland Henry Winfield (23411).
- Squadron Leader Herbert Benjamin Bell-Syer (39266), Reserve of Air Force Officers.
- Squadron Leader Curwen William Bromley (40782).
- Squadron Leader Henry Gordon Goddard, DFC, (70252), Royal Air Force Volunteer Reserve.
- Squadron Leader Hugh James Felce Le Good (32200).
- Squadron Leader William Edward Lawley Lewis (29038).
- Squadron Leader Bryce Gilmore Meharg (39941), Reserve of Air Force Officers.
- Squadron Leader Robert John Sage (39342).
- Squadron Leader Ivan George Statham (72119), Royal Air Force Volunteer Reserve.
- Squadron Leader James Richard Tobin (39909).
- Acting Squadron Leader Edgar Buhner Bright (23375).
- Acting Squadron Leader William Roy Greenslade (45202).
- Acting Squadron Leader Keith Constantine Roberts (70817), Reserve of Air Force Officers.
- Acting Squadron Leader Richard Somerville Sikes (70622), Reserve of Air Force Officers.
- Flight Lieutenant Thomas Roper Burne (33457).
- Flight Lieutenant James Moore Ennis (42341).
- Flight Lieutenant Arthur Gordon Hall (70914), Reserve of Air Force Officers.
- Flight Lieutenant Oswald Victor Holmes (77969), Royal Air Force Volunteer Reserve.
- Flight Lieutenant Thomas Henry Algernon Llewellyn (74656), Royal Air Force Volunteer Reserve.
- Flight Lieutenant Alan Ormerod Moffet (40736).
- Flight Lieutenant Ernest William Tacon, DFC, (36196).
- Acting Flight Lieutenant Ronald Gerard Addy (84699), Royal Air Force Volunteer Reserve.
- Acting Flight Lieutenant Ian Bishop Butler (84700), Royal Air Force Volunteer Reserve.
- Acting Flight Lieutenant Gerald Arthur Clarke (43165).
- Acting Flight Lieutenant Leslie John Flack (84705), Royal Air Force Volunteer Reserve.
- Acting Flight Lieutenant William Albert Alexander Read (80822), Royal Air Force Volunteer Reserve.
- Acting Flight Lieutenant Henry Wilfred Ward (80896), Royal Air Force Volunteer Reserve.
- Flying Officer Peter Andrew Kleboe (88440), Royal Air Force Volunteer Reserve.
- Flying Officer Norman John Wheeler (82668), Royal Air Force Volunteer Reserve.
- Flying Officer Clifford Wright (43081).
- Pilot Officer Jack Archer (46394).
- Pilot Officer Arthur Alexander Rollo (47003).
- Pilot Officer Reginald Arthur Studd (47188).
- Warrant Officer Leslie Stuart Millen, DFM (745789), Royal Air Force Volunteer Reserve.
- Warrant Officer William Gordon Ross (590112).
- Warrant Officer Joseph Edward Sunderland (337207).
- Acting Wing Commander William Raymond Garrett (Aus.118), Royal Australian Air Force.
- Squadron Leader Eric William Cooper (Aus.93), Royal Australian Air Force.
- Squadron Leader Charles Raymond Gurney (Aus.160), Royal Australian Air Force (since deceased).
- Squadron Leader William George Leer (Aus.173), Royal Australian Air Force.
- Acting Squadron Leader Frank Neale (Aus.231), Royal Australian Air Force.
- Acting Squadron Leader Harry Plumridge (Aus.354), Royal Australian Air Force.
- Flight Lieutenant John Leonard Grey, Royal Australian Air Force.
- Flight Lieutenant Godfrey Ellard Hemsworth, Royal Australian Air Force.
- Flight Lieutenant Michael Vaughan Mather, Royal Australian Air Force.
- Wing Commander Donald William Baird (N.Z.1016), Royal New Zealand Air Force.
- Flight Lieutenant Edward Buckland Firth (N.Z.1148), Royal New Zealand Air Force.

==== Bar to the Air Force Cross ====
- Wing Commander John William McGuire, AFC, (34211) (since deceased).

=== Air Force Medal (AFM) ===
- 740890 Flight Sergeant John Richard James Belson, Royal Air Force Volunteer Reserve.
- 749384 Flight Sergeant Reginald William Birchall. Royal Air Force Volunteer Reserve.
- 754392 Flight Sergeant John Richardson Emmerson, Royal Air Force Volunteer Reserve.
- 581331 Flight Sergeant (now Warrant Officer) William Henry Leslie Grant.
- 911888 Flight Sergeant James Edwards Sainsbury.
- 904918 Flight Sergeant Roy Derwent Stirk.
- 923219 Sergeant Lewis Larsen.
- 760158 Sergeant Thomas Stanley White, Royal Air Force Volunteer Reserve.
- 622843 Corporal Alexander Paxton Skelding Fimister.
- Aus.1974 Sergeant Newcombe Adrian Boddington, Royal Australian Air Force.
- Aus.16638 Corporal James Smith Lyall, Royal Australian Air Force.
- N.Z.63915 Sergeant Allan Arthur Hodder, Royal New Zealand Air Force.

=== King's Commendation for Valuable Service in the Air ===
- Charles Leonard Cheeseman, Radio Officer, British Overseas Airways Corporation.
- Frank Wilfred Holland, Civilian Armament Instructor, RAF Flying Training School (now No. 1670549, Aircraftman 2nd Class, Royal Air Force).
- Greg Grenville Lambert, Third Engineer, British Overseas Airways Corporation.
- Flight Captain Nigel Pelley, British Overseas Airways Corporation, Cairo.
- Ernest William Smith, Steward, British Overseas Airways Corporation.
- Captain Louis Bisson, RAF Ferry Command
- Captain Donald Moore McVicar, RAF Ferry Command.

=== King's Police and Fire Services Medal (KPFSM) ===
For Gallantry

England & Wales

- John Bannister, Sergeant, Metropolitan Police Force.
- William Oliver, Sergeant, Metropolitan Police Force.
- William Potter, Sergeant, Metropolitan Police Force.
- John McVernon, Constable, Metropolitan Police Force.
- William Monteith, Constable, Metropolitan Police Force.
- Bertie Coates, Inspector, Durham Constabulary.
- Thomas David Watkins, Sergeant, Glamorganshire Constabulary.
- Albert Edward Butterworth, Leading Fireman, No. 27 (Manchester) Fire Area.
- Wilfred Atherton, Fireman (Professional), No. 26 (Liverpool) Fire Area (St. Helens).

Northern Ireland

- Patrick Murphy, deceased, Constable, Royal Ulster Constabulary.

For Distinguished Service

England & Wales

- William Henry Beacher, Chief Constable of Reigate Borough Police Force.
- Robert Hall, Chief Constable of Rotherham Borough Police Force.
- Ernest James Braby, Superintendent, Berkshire Constabulary. Regional Police Staff Officer, No. 6 Region.
- Thomas Oldcorn, DCM, Superintendent, Cumberland and Westmorland Constabulary.
- Harry James Mortimer, Sub-Divisional Inspector, Metropolitan Police Force.
- Walter Henry Mardon, Fire Force Commander, No. 2 (Middlesbrough) Fire Area.

Scotland

- William Ferguson Thorn, Inspector and Deputy Chief Constable, Kincardine Constabulary.
- William James Paterson, Fire Inspector, Grade I, Scottish Home Department.

Northern Ireland

- William James Perrott, Head Constable, Royal Ulster Constabulary.

Australia

- Edward George Allen, Superintendent, First Class, New South Wales Police Force.
- George Campbell, lately Inspector, Second Class, New South Wales Police Force.
- Thomas William Hooper, Superintendent, First Class, New South Wales Police Force.
- James Frederick Scott, Superintendent, First Class, New South Wales Police Force.
- James Sharpies, lately Superintendent, Third Class, New South Wales Police Force.
- Hubert William Thompson, lately Superintendent, Third Class, New South Wales Police Force.
- John Joseph Walsh, Superintendent, First Class, New South Wales Police Force.

India

- Maurice Prince La Bouchardiere, Indian Police, Superintendent of Police, Labour Officer, Bombay.
- Ernest Michael Phillips, MBE, Deputy Superintendent of Police, United Provinces.
- Khan Sahib Qasim Ali Shah, Deputy Superintendent of Police, North West Frontier Province.

Colonies, Protectorates & Mandated Territories

- Emmanuele Calleja, Inspector (Acting Superintendent), Malta Police Force.
- Captain Rupert Leonard Hill, Superintendent of Police, Gambia.
- Geoffrey Jackson Morton, BEM, Assistant Superintendent of Police, Palestine.

=== Colonial Police Medal (CPM) ===
Southern Rhodesia

- Colonel John Sidney Morris, CBE, Inspector General of Police.

Colonies, Protectorates & Mandated Territories

- Tewfic Nour Abboushi, Sub-Inspector, Palestine Police Force.
- Robert Kenneth Allen, Assistant Inspector, Kenya Police Force.
- Jameel Rashid Assali, First Inspector, Palestine Police Force.
- Reginald Joseph Caldwell, British Inspector, Palestine Police Force.
- Ernest Knightly Catchpole, Superintendent, Kenya Police Force.
- Richard Charles Catling, Assistant Superintendent, Palestine Police Force.
- Matthew Kirkham Needham Collens, Senior Assistant Superintendent, Nigerian Police Force.
- Cecil Vivian Curtis, Assistant Superintendent, Uganda Police Force.
- Arthur Patrick Daly, Sergeant, Palestine Police Force.
- Daniel Day, Sergeant, Palestine Police Force.
- Joseph William Deegan, Assistant Superintendent, Uganda Police Force.
- Ziev Dichter, Sub-Inspector, Palestine Police Force.
- Igbimosun Evbuma, Constable, Nigerian Police Force.
- Lawrence Ewa, Sergeant, Nigerian Police Force.
- Robert Edward Foulger, Deputy Commissioner, Gold Coast Police Force.
- Sulemanu Grunshie, Escort Police Sergeant, Gold Coast.
- Herbert Harris, Superintendent, Nigerian Police Force.
- John Donald Hegerty, Deputy Superintendent, Palestine Police Force.
- Farrah Issa, First Sergeant, Kenya Police Force.
- Abdul Karim John, Sub-Inspector, Gambia Police Force.
- Edwin Fitzosbert Kelly, Detective Sergeant-Major, Trinidad Police Force.
- Dost Mohamed Kham, Chief Sub-Inspector, Tanganyika Territory Police Force.
- Roy James Philip McLaughlan, Senior Assistant Superintendent, Nigerian Police Force.
- George Leslie Mathews, Inspector, Palestine Police Force
- Captain William Manning, Senior Superintendent, Zanzibar Police Force.
- Bakari Mohamed, First Sergeant, Kenya Police Force.
- Arthur Robert Lungley Neame, Superintendent, Tanganyika Territory Police Force.
- James Tharsis Ogbolu, Assistant Superintendent, Nigerian Police Force.
- Robert Tetteh Kwabena Okpodjah, Sub-Inspector, Gold Coast Police Force.
- Pauliasi Raucikula, Sergeant, Fiji Police Force.
- Sat Bachan Singh, Chief Sub-Inspector, Kenya Police Force.
- James Arnold Sweeney, Assistant Superintendent, Nigerian Police Force
- Reginald Fulbrook Townsend, Deputy Superintendent, Palestine Police Force.
- Robert Vivian Douglas White, Superintendent, Nigerian Police Force.
- Dennis Leslie Wright, Assistant Inspector, Kenya Police Force.

== Canada ==
=== British Empire Medal (BEM) ===
Military Division
Royal Canadian Air Force

- Flight Sergeant J. R. Burdes.
- Flight Sergeant G. F. G. Gayton.
- Flight Sergeant J. H. Haime.
- Flight Sergeant W. E. S. Weir, Royal Air Force.
- Sergeant A. W. Appleby.
- Sergeant C. W. Boughner.
- Sergeant E. Gowda.
- Corporal T. A. Calow.
- Corporal A. S. Hayton.
- Corporal W. H. Smith.
- Leading Aircraftman A. E. Sinclair.

=== Distinguished Service Cross (DSC) ===
Royal Canadian Naval Reserve

- Lieutenant-Commander Edgar G. Skinner.
- Acting Lieutenant-Commander William Edward Slade Briggs.
- Acting Lieutenant-Commander George Hay Stephen.

=== Air Force Cross (AFC) ===
Royal Canadian Air Force

- Wing Commander C. P. Dunlop.
- Wing Commander R. H. Waterhouse, Royal Air Force.
- Wing Commander L. E. Wray.
- Acting Wing Commander R. L. Burnett, Royal Air Force.
- Acting Wing Commander C. Scragg, MBE, Royal Air Force.
- Squadron Leader R. D. Byers.
- Squadron Leader F. M. Milligan, Royal Air Force.
- Flight Lieutenant J. Hone.
- Flight Lieutenant J. P. Rae, Reserve of Air Force Officers.
- Flight Lieutenant J. H. Roberts.
- Flight Lieutenant N. E. Small.
- Flight Lieutenant E. M. Williams.
- Flying Officer F. H. A. McNeil.
- Flying Officer R. L. Rizon.

=== Air Force Medal (AFM) ===
Royal Canadian Air Force

- Flight Sergeant (now Pilot Officer) A. N. Hornby, Royal Air Force.
- Sergeant (now Pilot Officer) E. A. H. Bacon, Royal Air Force.
- Sergeant A. J. Chandler.
- Sergeant A. Deeks.
- Corporal L. G. Harvey.
- Leading Aircraftman W. J. Hunt.
