= 1934 Birthday Honours =

British government recognitions

The King's Birthday Honours 1934 were appointments in many of the Commonwealth realms of King George V to various orders and honours to reward and highlight good works by citizens of those countries. The appointments were made to celebrate the official birthday of The King. They were published on 4 June 1934.

The recipients of honours are displayed here as they were styled before their new honour, and arranged by honour, with classes (Knight, Knight Grand Cross, etc.) and then divisions (Military, Civil, etc.) as appropriate.

== United Kingdom and Colonies ==
=== Viscount ===
- Charles Cheers, Baron Wakefield, CBE, Honorary Colonel, 2nd City of London Regiment (The Royal Fusiliers). For public services, especially to Civil Aviation.

=== Baron ===
- The Right Honourable Robert, Lord Alness, LLD, lately Lord Justice Clerk and President of the Second Division, Court of Session.
- Sir Hugo Hirst, Bt, Chairman and Managing Director, General Electric Company Ltd. For public services.
- Gerald Walter Erskine Loder, President of the National Union of Conservative and Unionist Associations 1924-26. Member of Parliament for Brighton, 1889-1905. For political and public services.
- Brigadier-General George Charles, Earl of Lucan, KBE, CB, TD, Captain of the Honourable Corps of Gentlemen-at-Arms, January–June 1929, and since 1931. Conservative Whip in the House of Lords 1920-31, and Government Chief Whip since 1931.

=== Knights of the Thistle ===
- Archibald Alexander, Earl of Leven & Melville.
- Colonel Donald Walter Cameron of Lochiel, CMG, DL.

=== Privy Councillor ===
- Robert Anthony Eden, MC, JP, MP, Lord Privy Seal since January 1934. Undersecretary of State for Foreign Affairs 1931-33. Member of Parliament for Warwick & Leamington since 1923.

=== Baronet ===
- Sir Julien Cahn. For services to agriculture and to a number of charitable causes.
- Herbert Brent Grotrian, KC, JP. For public services.
- Major John Charles Harford, JP, DL. For political and public services in Cardiganshire.
- Sir David McCowan, JP, DL, President of the Glasgow Unionist Association. For political and public services in Scotland.
- Sir John Priestman, JP. For services to many social organisations in Durham.

=== Knight Bachelor ===
- Major Robert George Archibald, CMG, DSO, MD, Royal Army Medical Corps (Retd.), Director, Wellcome Tropical Research Laboratories, Sudan.
- Alderman John Aspell, JP, Chairman of the Highways Committee, Lancashire County Council.
- (George Harold Arthur) Comyns Berkeley, MA, MD, MC, FRCP, FRCS, FCOG, MMSA, Consulting Obstetric Surgeon, Middlesex Hospital. Director of the London County Council Radium Centre, Hampstead.
- Lieutenant-Colonel George Reginald Blake, TD, JP. For political and public services in Wiltshire.
- Samuel Brighouse, His Majesty's Coroner for South-West Lancashire.
- Edmund Ralph Cook, CBE, Secretary to the Law Society.
- Commander Charles Worthington Craven, OBE, Royal Navy (Retd.), Managing Director, Vickers-Armstrongs Ltd.
- Major Albert James Edmondson, MP, Member of Parliament for Banbury since 1922. For political and public services.
- Alfred William Flux, CB, Honorary Vice-President (past President) of the Royal Statistical Society.
- Captain William Jocelyn Ian Fraser, CBE, MP, Chairman of the Executive Council of St. Dunstan's. For services on behalf of the blind.
- Alderman Thomas Edward Higham, JP, DL. For political and public services in Accrington.
- Jesse William Hind. For public services in Nottinghamshire.
- John Edward Lloyd, MA, DLitt, FBA, Emeritus Professor of History at the University College of North Wales, Bangor.
- (George) Ian MacAlister, Secretary to the Royal Institute of British Architects.
- Ronald Wilfred Matthews, JP. For political and public services in Sheffield.
- Ralph Millbourn. For political and public services.
- Walter Hamilton Moberly, DSO, MA, DLitt, Vice-Chancellor, University of Manchester.
- Alderman Robert Pattinson, JP, DL, Member of Parliament for Grantham 1922-23. For political and public services in Lincolnshire.
- Francis Henry Pepper, JP. For political and public services in Birmingham.
- Colonel John Archibald Roxburgh, VD, LLD, JP, DL, President of the Boys' Brigade 1919-33.
- Frederick William Pascoe Rutter, Chairman of the London & Lancashire Insurance Co., Ltd. Ex-President of the Insurance Institute.
- Andrew Scott. For twenty-eight years Secretary to Lloyd's Register of Shipping.
- Grafton Elliot Smith, MD, LittD, DSc, FRS, FRCP, Professor of Anatomy in the University of London (University College).
- Robert Workman Smith, JP, MP, Member of Parliament for Central Aberdeenshire & Kincardineshire since October 1924. For political and public services.
- Waldron Smithers, JP, MP, Member of Parliament for Chislehurst since 1924. For political and public services.
- John Wilson Taylor, Honorary Secretary and Treasurer of the Pilgrims Association.
- Hugh Robert Topping, General Director of the Conservative and Unionist Central Office since 1928. For political services.
- Walter James Womersley, JP, MP, a Lord Commissioner of His Majesty's Treasury since 1931. Member of Parliament for Grimsby since 1924.

Dominions

- Robert Albert Anderson, CMG. For public services to shipping, education and banking in the Dominion of New Zealand.
- The Honourable David Gilbert Ferguson, formerly Judge of the Supreme Court, State of New South Wales; Chairman of the Federal Royal Commission on Taxation, Commonwealth of Australia.
- Robert Wilson Knox, Chairman of the Australian National Committee, International Chamber of Commerce, Commonwealth of Australia.
- Charles Edward Saunders, DSc, PhD, LLD, lately Dominion Cerealist, Dominion of Canada; discoverer of Marquis, Ruby, Reward and Garnet Wheat.
- Councillor Harold Gengoult Smith, Lord Mayor of Melbourne, State of Victoria.
- John Christian Ramsay Sturrock, CMG, Resident Commissioner, Basutoland.
- George Henry Wilson. For philanthropic services in the Dominion of New Zealand.

India

- Jwala Prasad Srivastava, Minister to the Governor of the United Provinces for Education.
- Mr. Justice Gilbert Hollinshead Blomfield Jackson, Indian Civil Service, Puisne Judge of the High Court of Judicature at Fort St. George, Madras.
- Miles Irving, CIE, OBE, Indian Civil Service, Financial Commissioner, Punjab.
- Major-General James Drummond Graham, CB, CIE, KHS, Indian Medical Service (Retd.), late Public Health Commissioner with the Government of India.
- Maurice William Brayshay, Agent, Bombay, Baroda & Central India Railway, Bombay.
- Rai Bahadur Satya Charan Mukherjee CBE, MLA, Zamindar, Bengal.
- John Arnold Cherry, CIE, Chairman of the Port Commissioners, Rangoon, Burma.
- Albert Howard, CIE, lately Agricultural Adviser to the States in Central India and Rajputana.
- William Owen Wright, OBE, Director, Messrs. Parry & Co. Ltd., Madras.
- Khan Bahadur Mahbubmiyan Imambaksh Kadri, OBE, Retired District Judge, Bombay.
- Rai Bahadur Upendra Nath Brahmachari, Medical Practitioner, Bengal.
- Khan Bahadur Dosabhai Hormasji Bhiwandiwalla, Landlord, Bombay.
- Maulvi Saiyid Liaqat Ali, Minister in Attendance on His Highness the Nawab of Bhopal, Central India.
- Sohrabji Nusserwanji Pochkhanawala, Managing Director of the Central Bank of India Ltd., Bombay.

Colonies, Protectorates, &c.

- Captain Maxwell Hendry Maxwell-Anderson, CBE, Royal Navy (Retd.), Chief Justice, Fiji.
- Crawford Douglas Douglas-Jones, CMG, Colonial Secretary, British Guiana.
- Brigadier-General Godfrey Dean Rhodes, CBE, DSO, Royal Engineers (Retd.), General Manager, Railways & Harbours, Kenya & Uganda.
- Arnold Percy Robinson, Unofficial Member of the Executive and Legislative Councils of the Straits Settlements. For public services.
- Salisbury Stanley Spurling, CMG, OBE, VD, Unofficial Member of the Executive Council of Bermuda. For public services.

=== Order of the Bath ===
==== Knight Grand Cross of the Order of the Bath (GCB) ====
Military Division

- General Sir Archibald Armar Montgomery-Massingberd, KCB, KCMG, Colonel Commandant, Royal Regiment of Artillery, Aide-de-Camp General to The King, Chief of the Imperial General Staff.

==== Knight Commander of the Order of the Bath (KCB) ====
Military Division

Royal Navy

- Admiral Lionel George Preston, CB.
- Vice-Admiral Martin Eric Dunbar-Nasmith, VC, CB.
- Engineer Vice-Admiral Harold Arthur Brown, CB.

Army

- Lieutenant-General Bertram Richard Kirwan, CB, CMG, Retd. pay, Colonel Commandant, Royal Regiment of Artillery, late Master-General of the Ordnance, India.
- Lieutenant-General William Henry Bartholomew, CB, CMG, DSO, (late Royal Artillery), Chief of the General Staff, India.
- Lieutenant-General George Alexander Weir, CB, CMG, DSO, Colonel, 3rd Carabiniers (Prince of Wales's Dragoon Guards), General Officer Commanding, The British Troops in Egypt.
- Lieutenant-General Antony Ernest Wentworth Harman, CB, DSO, Retd. pay, Colonel, The Queen's Bays (2nd Dragoon Guards), late General Officer Commanding, 1st Division.

Civil Division

- Brigadier-General Richard Beale Colvin, CB, TD, President, Territorial Army Association of the County of Essex.
- John Jeffrey, CB, CBE, Permanent Under-Secretary of State for Scotland.
- Sir John Loader Maffey, KCMG, KCVO, CSI, CIE, Permanent Under-Secretary of State, Colonial Office.

==== Companion of the Order of the Bath (CB) ====
Military Division

Royal Navy

- Rear-Admiral Noel Frank Laurence, DSO.
- Rear-Admiral Andrew Browne Cunningham, DSO.
- Rear-Admiral Max Kennedy Horton, DSO.
- Colonel William Henry Lainson Tripp, DSO, MC, Royal Marines.

Army

- Major-General Patrick Hagart Henderson, DSO, MB, (late Royal Army Medical Corps), Honorary Physician to The King, Director of Hygiene, The War Office.
- Major-General Baptist Barton Crozier, CMG, DSO, (late Royal Artillery), Half-pay, General Officer Commanding, designate, 43rd (Wessex) Division, Territorial Army, Southern Command.
- Major-General Octavius Henry Lothian Nicholson, CMG, DSO, (late The King's Own Royal Regiment (Lancaster)), Colonel, 1st/4th Bombay Grenadiers, Indian Army, Half-pay, General Officer Commanding, designate, Deccan District, Southern Command, India.
- Major-General Walter Pitts Hendy Hill, CMG, DSO, (late The Loyal Regiment (North Lancashire)), Colonel, The Royal Fusiliers (City of London Regiment), Major-General in charge of Administration, Southern Command.
- Major-General Llewellyn Isaac Gethin Morgan-Owen, CMG, CBE, DSO, Colonel, The South Wales Borderers, Major-General in charge of Administration, Eastern Command.
- Major-General Andrew Jameson McCulloch, DSO, DCM, (late 14th King's Hussars), General Officer Commanding, 52nd (Lowland) Division, Territorial Army, Scottish Command.
- Major-General Percy Ryan Conway Commings, CMG, DSO, (late The South Staffordshire Regiment), Half-pay, General Officer Commanding, designate, 56th (1st London) Division, Territorial Army, London District.
- Colonel (temporary Brigadier) Frederick Gordon Spring, CMG, DSO, (late The Lincolnshire Regiment), Commander, Poona (Independent) Brigade Area, Southern Command, India.
- Major-General Ernest Alexander Walker, MB, FRCS (Edin.), Indian Medical Service, Honorary Surgeon to The King, Director of Medical Services, India.
- Colonel (temporary Brigadier) Betham Wilkins Shuttleworth, Indian Army, Commander, Ferozepore Brigade Area, Northern Command, India.
- Colonel (temporary Brigadier) Lionel Peter Collins, DSO, OBE, Indian Army, Aide-de-Camp to The King, Commandant, Indian Military Academy, India.

Civil Division

- Rear-Admiral Wilbraham Tennyson Randle Ford.
- Surgeon Rear-Admiral Percival Thomas Nicholls, MRCS, LRCP.
- Colonel Percy Reginald Owen Abel Simner, DSO, DL, Territorial Army.
- Honorary Colonel Francis Killigrew Seymour Metford, OBE, VD, TD, DL, (Lieutenant-Colonel, Retd., Territorial Army), Chairman, Territorial Army Association of the County of Gloucester.
- Alfred Richard Ainsworth, Principal Assistant Secretary, Board of Education.
- William Barrowclough Brown, CBE, Assistant Secretary, Board of Trade.
- Crawfurd Wilfrid Griffin Eady, CMG, Principal Assistant Secretary, Ministry of Labour.
- Wing Commander Eric John Hodsoll, Royal Air Force, Assistant Secretary, Committee of Imperial Defence.
- Reginald Edward Stradling, MC, DSc, PhD, MInstCE, Director of Building & Road Research, Department of Scientific and Industrial Research.
- Lieutenant-Colonel Sir Ralph Verney, CIE, CVO, Examiner of Petitions for Private Bills and Taxing Officer, House of Commons. Acting Secretary to the Speaker.

Additional Companion

- Major the Honourable Alexander Henry Louis Hardinge, CVO, MC, Equerry and Assistant Private Secretary to His Majesty The King since 1920.

=== Order of the Star of India ===
==== Knight Grand Commander of the Order of the Star of India (GCSI) ====
- Lieutenant-Colonel the Right Honourable Sir George Frederick Stanley, GCIE, CMG, Governor of Madras and Acting Governor-General of India.
- Field-Marshal Sir Philip Walhouse Chetwode, Bt, GCB, KCMG, DSO, Commander-in-Chief, India.

==== Knight Commander of the Order of the Star of India (KCSI) ====
- Sir Frank Noyce, CSI, CBE, Indian Civil Service, Member of the Governor-General's Executive Council.
- Major His Highness Raje Bahadur Shrimant Khem Savant Bhonsle, alias Bapu Saheb, Raja of Savantvadi, Deccan States Agency.

==== Companion of the Order of the Star of India (CSI) ====
- Maurice Garnier Hallett, CIE, Indian Civil Service, Secretary to the Government of India, Home Department.
- Geoffrey Thomas Hirst Bracken, CIE, Indian Civil Service, Chief Secretary to the Government of Madras.
- Philip Cubitt Tallents, CIE, Indian Civil Service, Chief Secretary to the Government of Bihar and Orissa.
- Richard Henry Beckett, CIE, Indian Educational Service, Director of Public Instruction, Bombay.
- Paul Joseph Patrick, Assistant Secretary, Political Department (Internal), India Office.

=== Order of Saint Michael and Saint George ===
==== Knight Grand Cross of the Order of St Michael and St George (GCMG) ====
- Sir Alfred Claud Hollis, KCMG, CBE, Governor & Commander-in-Chief of the Colony of Trinidad & Tobago.
- The Right Honourable Sir Eric Clare Edmund Phipps, KCMG, CVO, His Majesty's Ambassador Extraordinary & Plenipotentiary in Berlin.

==== Knight Commander of the Order of St Michael and St George (KCMG) ====
- Sir Edward Davson, Bt. For services in connection with the economic problems of the Colonies.
- Lieutenant-Colonel Bernard Rawdon Reilly, CIE, OBE, DSO, Chief Commissioner, Resident, & Commander-in-Chief, Aden.
- Ambrose Thomas Stanton, CMG, MD, FRCP, Chief Medical Adviser to the Secretary of State for the Colonies.
- Mark Aitchison Young, CMG, Governor & Commander-in-Chief of the Island of Barbados & its Dependencies.
- Gerald Campbell, CMG, His Majesty's Consul-General in New York.
- The Honourable Sir Edgar Rennie Bowring, Kt, High Commissioner for Newfoundland 1918-22, and since 1933.
- The Honourable John Cameron McPhee, lately Premier and Treasurer, State of Tasmania.
- Claude Hill Reading, Chairman of the Board of the Commonwealth Bank, Commonwealth of Australia.

==== Companion of the Order of St Michael and St George (CMG) ====
- The Reverend Canon Sidney Arthur Alexander, CVO, MA, Canon and Treasurer of St Paul's Cathedral. For services in connection with the annual service of the Order of Saint Michael & Saint George.
- Noel Gray Frere, Provincial Commissioner, Sierra Leone.
- Edward Butler Home, OBE, Provincial Commissioner, Kenya.
- William Edgar Hunt, CBE, Commissioner of the Colony and Commissioner of Lands, Nigeria.
- Colonel Geoffrey Archibald Prentice Maxwell, DSO, MVO, MC, Royal Engineers (Retd.), General Manager, Railways, Tanganyika Territory.
- Robert Howson Murray, Provincial Commissioner, Nyasaland Protectorate.
- Malcolm Bond Shelley, British Resident, Perak, Federated Malay States.
- Roy Godfrey Bullen Spicer, MC, Inspector General of Police & Prisons, Palestine.
- Professor Robert Scott Troup, CIE, MA, DSc, FRS, Professor of Forestry, Oxford University. For services to forestry in the colonies.
- Major Hanns Vischer, CBE, Joint Secretary and Member of the Advisory Committee on Education in the Colonies.
- Arthur Evelyn Weatherhead, Provincial Commissioner, Uganda Protectorate.
- Laurence Collier, Counsellor in the Foreign Office.
- Henry Fitzmaurice, MBE, His Majesty's Consul-General at Batavia.
- John Berkeley Monck, CVO, His Majesty's Assistant Marshal of the Diplomatic Corps.
- Thomas Maitland Snow, Counsellor at His Majesty's Embassy in Madrid.
- Reginald Keble Winter, Secretary for Education & Health, Sudan Government.
- Arthur Clement Bagshawe, Secretary, Department of Agriculture & Lands, Southern Rhodesia.
- William James Clemens, ISO, Commissioner, Public Services Board, Commonwealth of Australia.
- James Christie, LLM, Parliamentary Law Draughtsman, Dominion of New Zealand.
- Reginald Malet de Carteret, Lieutenant Bailiff of Jersey and Jurat of the Royal Court of Jersey.
- Noel Elmslie, His Majesty's Senior Trade Commissioner in the Union of South Africa.
- George William Hutchison, Mayor of Auckland, Dominion of New Zealand.
- Alexander Johnston, lately Deputy Minister of Marine, Dominion of Canada.
- David Crichton Lamb, Commissioner of the Salvation Army. For services in connection with emigration and Empire settlement.
- Ernest Joseph Lemaire, Clerk of the King's Privy Council, Dominion of Canada.
- Lieutenant Colonel Leslie Miltiades Mullen, DSO, President of the Returned Sailors' & Soldiers' League, State of Tasmania.
- Henry Arthur Pitt, OBE, Director of Finance, State of Victoria.
- The Honourable William James Roche, LLD, Member of the King's Privy Council, and Chairman of the Civil Service Commission, Dominion of Canada.
- Duncan Campbell Scott, LittD, FRSC, FRSL, lately Deputy Superintendent General of Indian Affairs, Dominion of Canada.

Honorary Companion

- His Highness Tengku Ibrahim ibni Almerhum Sultan Mohamed IV, Raja of Kelantan, Malay States.

=== Order of the Indian Empire ===
==== Knight Commander of the Order of the Indian Empire (KCIE) ====
- Khwaja Nazim-ud-Din, CIE, Member of the Executive Council of the Governor of Bengal.
- Edward Arthur Henry Blunt, CIE, OBE, Indian Civil Service, Member of the Executive Council of the Governor of the United Provinces.
- Sir Ernest Burdon, CSI, CIE, Indian Civil Service, Auditor-General in India.
- Sir James Macdonald Dunnett, CIE, Indian Civil Service, Reforms Commissioner, Government of India, on deputation to India Office.
- Rai Bahadur Sir Bisheshar Das Daga, Head of the firm of Rai Bahadur Seth Bansilal Abirchand, Bankers, Nagpur, Central Provinces.

==== Companion of the Order of the Indian Empire (CIE) ====
- Raja Bahadur Jawahir Singh, Raja of Sarangarh, Eastern States Agency.
- Rana Shri Chhatrasalji, Thakore of Kadana, Gujarat States Agency.
- Malcolm Lyall Darling, Indian Civil Service, Commissioner, Punjab.
- Henry Challen Greenfield, Indian Civil Service, Commissioner, Berar, Central Provinces.
- John William Kelly, Indian Audit and Accounts Service, Controller of the Currency, Calcutta, Bengal.
- Colonel (temporary Brigadier) Raymond Somerville Scott, Indian Army, Director of Remounts, Army Headquarters, India.
- Major Nawab Ahmed Nawaz Khan, OBE, MLA, of Dera Ismail Khan, North-West Frontier Province.
- Hugh Meggison Hood, Indian Civil Service, Secretary to the Government of Madras, Finance Department.
- Stephen Harris Covernton, Indian Civil Service, Secretary to the Government of Bombay, Revenue Department.
- Robert Niven Gilchrist, Indian Educational Service, Joint Secretary to the Government of Bengal, Commerce & Marine Departments, and Labour Commissioner, Bengal.
- Frederick Canning, Indian Forest Service, Chief Conservator of Forests, United Provinces.
- Captain Edward Heath Dauglish, lately Chief Staff Officer to the Flag Officer Commanding, Royal Indian Marine.
- John Matthew Blackwood Stuart, Indian Service of Engineers, Chief Engineer, Irrigation Branch, Burma.
- Patrick Edward Aitchison, Indian Forest Department, Chief Conservator of Forests, Bombay Presidency.
- Lieutenant-Colonel John Alfred Steele Phillips, Indian Medical Service, Director of Public Health, Bihar and Orissa.
- Frank Thomas de Monte, Chief Engineer, Posts & Telegraphs.
- William McRae, FLS, Indian Agricultural Service, Director and Imperial Mycologist, Imperial Institute of Agricultural Research, Pusa.
- Captain Archie William Ibbotson, MBE, MC, Indian Civil Service, lately Revenue Minister, Alwar State.
- Albert James Mainwaring, Indian Civil Service, District Magistrate and Collector, Monghyr, Bihar and Orissa.
- Major George Van Baerle Gillan, of the Political Department, Political Agent, Gilgit.
- Brevet-Major Harry Hall Johnson, of the Political Department, Political Agent, South Waziristan, North-West Frontier Province.
- Lieutenant-Colonel Harold Holmes King, Indian Medical Service, Director, King Institute, Guindy, Madras.
- Archibald Douglas Gordon, Indian Police, Deputy Inspector-General of Police, Bakarganj Range, Bengal Presidency.
- Eric Llewellyn Marriott, Indian Police, Deputy Inspector-General of Police, Northern Range, Bihar and Orissa.
- Sydney Herbert Bigsby, Indian Service of Engineers, recently Superintending Engineer, Public Works Department, and Trade Member of the Jaipur State Council, now Superintending Engineer, Punjab.
- John Matthai, Indian Educational Service, President, Indian Tariff Board, Madras.
- Vincent Aubrey Stewart Stow, Indian Educational Service, Principal, Mayo College, Ajmer, Ajmer-Merwara.
- William Roberts, Managing Director, British Cotton Growing Association, Khanewal, Multan District, Punjab.
- Alasdair Fraser Stuart, Manager, Kumbhir Tea Estate, Cachar, Chairman, Surma Valley Branch, Indian Tea Association, Assam.

=== Royal Victorian Order ===
==== Knight Grand Cross of the Royal Victorian Order (GCVO) ====
- John Charles, Duke of Buccleuch & Queensberry, KT.
- Field Marshal Edmund Henry Hynman, Viscount Allenby, GCB, GCMG.
- Sir Milsom Rees, KCVO.
- Edward Robert Peacock.

==== Knight Commander of the Royal Victorian Order (KCVO) ====
- Sir Reginald Ward Edward Lane Poole.
- The Honourable Montague Charles Eliot, CVO, OBE.
- Maurice Alan Cassidy, CB, MD.

==== Commander of the Royal Victorian Order (CVO) ====
- Brigadier-General Sir Smith Hill Child, Bt, CB, CMG, DSO, MVO.
- Paymaster Rear-Admiral Sir Hamnet Holditch Share, KBE, CB.
- Hubert Stanley Martin, CBE.
- Henry McGrady Bell, CBE.
- Louis Francis Roebuck Knuthsen, OBE, MD.
- Charles Henry Collins Baker.

==== Member of the Royal Victorian Order, 4th class (MVO) ====
- Lieutenant-Colonel Eric Garnett Atkinson.
- Major Douglas William Alexander Dalziel Mackenzie, DSO.
- Major Humphrey Butler, MC, (Dated 25 April 1934.)
- Jean Marie Claude Barlerin, MVO (5th Class).

==== Member of the Royal Victorian Order, 5th class (MVO) ====
- John Robert Baxter Hayward, MBE.
- Fred Harry Casswell.
- Arthur George Beckett.

=== Order of the British Empire ===
==== Knight Grand Cross of the Order of the British Empire (GBE) ====
Civil Division

- Sir Alan Garrett Anderson, KBE, a former President of the Chamber of Shipping and of the Association of British Chambers of Commerce. Has rendered valuable services to Government Departments.
- Sir John Charles Walsham Reith, LLD, Director-General of the British Broadcasting Corporation.
- Colonel Nawab Malik Sir Umar Hayat Khan, Tiwana, KCIE, CBE, MVO, ADC, lately Member of the Council of India.

==== Dame Commander of the Order of the British Empire (DBE) ====
Civil Division

- Elizabeth Mary Cadbury, OBE, JP. For educational and social services.
- Alicia Frances Jane Lloyd Still, CBE, RRC, President of the International Council of Nurses. Matron of St Thomas' Hospital.

==== Knight Commander of the Order of the British Empire (KBE) ====
Military Division

Royal Navy

- Vice-Admiral Barry Edward Domvile, CB, CMG.

Army

- Major-General Leopold Charles Louis Oldfield, CB, CMG, DSO, Retd. pay (late Royal Artillery), late General Officer Commanding, Malaya.

Royal Air Force

- Air Marshal Robert Hamilton Clark-Hall, CMG, DSO.

Civil Division

- Sir Thomas Robinson, OBE, JP, until recently Chairman of the Dyestuffs Advisory Licensing Committee under the Dyestuffs (Import Regulation) Act. Chairman of the Manchester Port Sanitary Authority.
- Frederick Grant Banting, DSc, LLD, MD, MRCS, LRCP, of the Dominion of Canada, discoverer of insulin.
- Philip Henry Macarthur Goldfinch, lately Chairman of the British Settlers' Welfare Committee, State of New South Wales.

==== Commander of the Order of the British Empire (CBE) ====
Military Division

Royal Navy

- Engineer Rear-Admiral John Henry Hocken, (Retd.)

Army

- Colonel William Shand Mackenzie, OBE, Royal Army Pay Corps, Chief Paymaster, Aldershot Command.
- Colonel George Parson, DSO, Commandant, Defence Force, Southern Rhodesia.
- Colonel Thomas Charles Sinclair (late Royal Artillery), Commandant, School of Anti-Aircraft Defence.
- Lieutenant-Colonel Nathaniel William Benjamin Butler Thorns, DSO, MC, Regular Army Reserve of Officers (late New Zealand Staff Corps), late Commandant, Shanghai Volunteer Corps.

Royal Air Force

- Air Commodore John Tremayne Babington, DSO.
- Group Captain Edward Cecil Clements, OBE, MRCS, LRCP.

Civil Division

- John Crosthwaite Bridge, FRCS(Ed), MRCP(Ed), DPH, Senior Medical Inspector of Factories, Home Office.
- Beatrice Anna Cartwright, JP. For political and public services in Northamptonshire.
- Captain Geoffrey de Havilland, FRAeS, Director and Designer, The de Havilland Aircraft Company.
- Elsie Fogerty, LRAM, Founder and Principal of the Central School of Speech Training & Dramatic Art.
- Clayre Anstruther-Gray, JP, ex-Chairman, Central Council, Scottish Women's Rural Institutes.
- John Peter Hilton, Manager of the Birmingham Municipal Savings Bank.
- Cyril Arthur Liddon Lewis, Registrar, HM Land Registry.
- Loughnan St. Lawrence Pendred, Editor-in-Chief of The Engineer.
- Albert Reginald Powys, FSA, ARIBA, Secretary of the Society for the Protection of Ancient Buildings.
- John Thomas Richards, OBE, Chairman of the Cardiff Court of Referees under the Unemployment Insurance Acts.
- Richard Jefferson Simpson, OBE, Assistant Secretary, Ministry of Health.
- Leonard James Spencer, ScD, FRS, Keeper of Minerals, British Museum (Natural History).
- Charles James Gerrard Tate, OBE, Assistant Secretary, Ministry of Pensions.
- Henry Milnes Walker, JP. For political and public services in Barnsley.
- Lieutenant-Colonel Frederick William Abbot, a British resident in Paris.
- William Lawrence Balls, FRS, MA, DSc, Chief Botanist, Egyptian Ministry of Agriculture.
- Herbert George Chick, CIE, lately His Majesty's Consul-General at Salonica.
- Margaret Eleanor Theodora Addison, LLD, lately Dean of Women, Victoria College, University of Toronto, Dominion of Canada.
- Mary Elizabeth Waagen Allan. For services in connection with crippled children, public health and welfare in the Dominion of Canada.
- William Henry Chase, OBE, Chief Veterinary and Agricultural Officer, Bechuanaland Protectorate.
- Colonel the Honourable Harold Edward Cohen, CMG, DSO, VD, Member of the Legislative Council, State of Victoria.
- Mary Winnifred Kydd, MA, President of the National Council of Women, Dominion of Canada.
- Alice Mabel Moss, JP, President of the National Council of Women, Commonwealth of Australia.
- Très Honorée Mère Marie-Anna Piché, Supérieure Générale des Soeurs de la Charité de l'Hôpital Général, "Soeurs Grises" de Montreal, Dominion of Canada.
- John Reid Rowland, Mayor of Salisbury, Southern Rhodesia.
- Margaret Marshall Saunders, MA. In recognition of services for the Humane Society, Dominion of Canada.
- Robert Percy Ward, lately Under Secretary, Justice Department, Dominion of New Zealand.
- Frederick William Brunton, Surveyor General, British Honduras.
- Sydney Herbert Fazan, OBE, Senior District Commissioner, Kenya.
- Frederick Claud Marriott, OBE, MA, lately Director of Education, Trinidad.
- William Henry Peacock, MB, BSc, Deputy Director of Health Services, Nigeria.
- Brevet-Colonel Percy Reginald Worrall, DSO, MC, Officer Commanding, King's Own Malta Regiment. For services as Island Commissioner, Boy Scouts, Malta.

Honorary Commander

- Abdullahi Bayero, Emir of Kano, Nigeria.

==== Officer of the Order of the British Empire (OBE) ====
Military Division

Royal Navy

- Commander Robert Collet Woollerton.
- Lieutenant-Commander Robert Foley Knight.
- Lieutenant-Commander Frank Percival Busbridge, DSC.
- Engineer Commander Robert Harry Withey.
- Paymaster Commander David Sidney Lambert.
- Captain Eric Elgood, VD, Royal Naval Volunteer Reserve.

Army

- Captain & Brevet Major (local Lieutenant-Colonel) John Edmund Hugh Boustead, MC, The Gordon Highlanders, attached Sudan Defence Force.
- Captain (local Major) John Agutta Brawn, The Norfolk Regiment, Officer Commanding, The Gambia Company, Royal West African Frontier Force.
- Lieutenant-Colonel & Brevet Colonel William Moncrieff Carr, TD, Territorial Army Reserve of Officers, Honorary Colonel, 55th West Lancashire Divisional Engineers, Royal Engineers, Territorial Army.
- Ethel Rose Collins, RRC, Principal Matron, Queen Alexandra's Imperial Military Nursing Service, Army Medical Directorate, The War Office.
- Lieutenant-Colonel Geoffrey Valence Comyn, MC, Indian Army Service Corps, Assistant Director of Supplies & Transport, Peshawar District, India.
- Temporary Captain Bernard Coombs, Royal Engineers, attached Royal Corps of Signals, Western Command.
- Captain John Mervyn Cox, AMIMechE, Royal Army Service Corps, Assistant Military Landing Officer, Shanghai.
- Major Harold Somerville Gordon, 2nd Battalion, 8th Gurkha Rifles.
- Major Leonard Horace Charles Hatton, MC, Retd. pay, Reserve of Officers, 15th/19th The King's Royal Hussars, attached Egyptian Army, Officer Commanding, Camel Corps and Car Patrols, Frontiers Administration.
- Major (Quarter-Master) Frederick Judge, 4th/5th Battalion, The Royal Scots Fusiliers, Territorial Army.
- Captain Denis Patrick Joseph Kelly, MC, BA, Army Educational Corps, Chief Instructor, Army School of Education, India.
- Major & Brevet Lieutenant-Colonel Walter Douglas Lidderdale, MC, late 94th (Queen's Own Dorset Yeomanry), Army Field Brigade, Royal Artillery, Territorial Army.
- Colonel Walter Lister, TD, late Assistant Director of Medical Services, 49th (West Riding) Division, Territorial Army.
- Major (Quarter-Master) William Henry Lowe, 1st Battalion, The Durham Light Infantry.
- Major Paul Anthony Meade, MC, 3rd Battalion (Sikhs), 12th Frontier Force Regiment, Officer-in-Charge, Baluchistan Intelligence Bureau.
- Lieutenant-Colonel George Christian Meredith, MC, Officer Commanding, 1st Battalion, Straits Settlements Volunteer Force.
- Major (Quarter-Master) Frederick Montague Augustus Morris, MBE, Extra Regimentally Employed List, Camp Commandant, Egypt.
- Major (Quarter-Master) John William Porter, TD, 9th Battalion, The Durham Light Infantry, Territorial Army.
- Major (Quarter-Master) Charles Frederick Schoon, DCM, 7th City of London Regiment (Post Office Rifles), Territorial Army.
- Major & Ordnance Mechanical Engineer, 2nd Class, William Auchinleck Stack, MIMechE, Royal Army Ordnance Corps, Chief Ordnance Mechanical Engineer, Malta.
- Major Douglas Henry Steers, Royal Engineers, Staff Officer to Chief Engineer, Eastern Command.
- Lieutenant-Colonel Harold Matthias Arthur Ward, DSO, TD, Commanding, Suffolk Heavy Brigade, Royal Artillery, Territorial Army.

Royal Air Force

- Wing Commander Alexander Shekleton, DSO.
- Wing Commander Francis Percival Don.
- Squadron Leader Robert Jope-Slade, DSC.
- Squadron Leader Robert Parker Musgrave Whitham, MC.
- Squadron Leader William Forster Dickson, DSO, AFC.

Civil Division

- Andrew Newton Anderson, Permanent Secretary to the Supreme Court of Judicature, Northern Ireland, and Clerk of the Crown, Northern Ireland.
- Percy Stanley Brandon, Chief Accountant, Board of Customs and Excise.
- Major Crossley St. John Broadbent, TD, Chairman of the Blackburn, Clitheroe & District War Pensions Committee.
- Alderman Richard Brodie. For political and public services in Mile End.
- Clement Guy Caines, MBE, Principal, Air Ministry.
- Ina Marjorie Gwendolin, Lady George Cholmondeley, Secretary of the National Birthday Trust Fund.
- Arthur Disbrowe Cotton, Keeper of the Herbarium and Library, Royal Botanic Gardens, Kew.
- Isabella Martha Drummond, MA, Head Mistress, North London Collegiate School.
- Robert Broomfield Dyer, MBE, JP, ex-Provost of Stranraer. For public services.
- Emily Helen Ekins, BSc, Principal of Studley Horticultural & Agricultural College for Women.
- Harold Fieldhouse, Public Assistance Officer, City of Leeds.
- Edgar Hamilton Frazer, MSc, His Majesty's Divisional Inspector of Mines, Scotland Division.
- James Glen, FSI, JP, Assistant Chief Valuer (Scotland), Board of Inland Revenue.
- Stanley Vernon Goodall, MBE, Assistant Director of Naval Construction.
- Alderman Joseph Crookes Grime, MBE, JP. For political and public services in Manchester.
- Stanley Albert Hector, Chief Constable, Coventry City Police.
- Harry Hughes Herman, Chief Constable, York City Police.
- Harry Edward Hewitt, MD, BS, MRCS, LRCP, DPH, Second Medical Officer, General Post Office.
- John Douglas Johnstone, Head Master, Staffordshire Boys' School, Werrington, a Home Office School.
- George Arthur Jones, Principal, Colonial Office.
- John Henry Jones, Finance Officer & Accountant, Department of Overseas Trade.
- Lancelot Herman Keay, FRIBA, Director of Housing of the City of Liverpool.
- William Dow Kennedy, MA, FEIS, JP, Director of Education to the Banff Education Authority.
- William Louis Lawton, JP, Representative of the Trustee Savings Banks' Association on the National Savings Committee.
- George Leigh, JP, Superintendent Registrar of Births, Deaths & Marriages for Bucklow.
- Thomas Mann, JP, Chairman of the Dumbarton War Pensions Committee.
- Tasman Millington, Area Superintendent (Eastern District) (Gallipoli), Imperial War Graves Commission.
- John Moir, Depute, and until recently Interim Principal, Clerk of Session.
- Kevern Ivor Morgan, FCA. For political and public services in Swansea.
- John Oliver, JP, Chairman of the Gateshead Juvenile Advisory Committee.
- John Beaumont Phelps, lately Secretary to the Irish Lights Commissioners.
- Hester Robins. For political and public services in Devonshire.
- George Edward Shepherd, Principal, India Office.
- Captain Donald Petrie Simson, Honorary Secretary, British Empire Service League, an organisation for assisting ex-Servicemen throughout the Empire.
- Annie Lorrain Smith, FLS. For contributions to mycology and lichenology.
- Lieutenant-Colonel Vincent Percy Smith, Royal Engineers (Retd.), Technical Adviser to the Director General of the Territorial Army.
- Archie Roberts Stevens, Head Master, Jarrow Secondary School.
- Alderman George James Thrasher, JP, Chairman of the Aylesbury Guardians Committee of the Buckinghamshire Public Assistance Committee.
- James Gumming Wynnes, MBE, FRIBA, Architect, His Majesty's Office of Works and Public Buildings.
- The Reverend John Irwin Brown, DD, Scots Presbyterian Minister at Rotterdam.
- Henry Cave Ayles Carpenter, PhD, Commercial Secretary at His Majesty's Legation at Berne.
- Donald St. Clair Gainer, His Majesty's Consul-General at Munich.
- Katherine Stewart MacPhail, MB, ChB (Glas.), member of the British community in Belgrade.
- Thomas Hildebrand Preston, His Majesty's Consul and Chargé d'Affaires ad interim at Kovno.
- Frank Edmund Stafford, Financial Secretary at His Majesty's Embassy at Bagdad.
- Harold Couch Swan, His Majesty's Consul-General at Léopoldville.
- Sydney George Barker, PhD, DIC, FRSE. For research services to the Empire Marketing Board.
- Edwin Lister Brittain. For honorary services for the Patriotic Fund of the Dominion of Canada.
- The Reverend James Henry Cain. For social welfare work in the State of Victoria.
- William James Coogan. For services in connection with Roman Catholic social movements in the State of New South Wales.
- Mabelle Grant Cooper, Member of the British Settlers' Welfare Committee, State of New South Wales.
- Lilian Airee Foster, formerly Secretary to the Welfare Committee of the New Settlers' League, State of Victoria.
- Theophilus Cecil Fynn, Magistrate and Civil Commissioner of Bulawayo, Southern Rhodesia.
- The Reverend Canon David John Garland, Director of Immigration for the Church of England, and President of the New Settlers' League, State of Queensland.
- The Honourable Abraham Kean. For services in connection with the sealing industry of Newfoundland extending for over sixty years.
- Lorna Priscilla Leatham, Honorary Treasurer of the Yorkshire Voluntary Migration Committee.
- Ada Florence Manning, President of the Women's Immigration Auxiliary Council, and Member of the Executive of the Victoria League, State of Western Australia.
- Nancy Consett Stephen, MBE. For services in connection with the Red Cross Society and blinded ex-soldiers in the Commonwealth of Australia.
- Khan Bahadur Elatt Valiagath Amu Sahib Bahadur, Indian Police, Officiating District Superintendent of Police, Madras.
- Arthur Alexander Bryant, Assistant General Superintendent, The Tata Iron & Steel Co. Ltd., Jamshedpur, Bihar and Orissa.
- Evan Victor Creak, MBE, lately Officer Supervisor, Adjutant-General's Branch, Army Headquarters, India.
- Mark Daniels, Controller, India Store Department, London.
- Rai Bahadur Shambhu Chandra Dutta, Vice-Chairman, District Board, Midnapore, Bengal.
- Philip Edmund Stanley Finney, Indian Police, Superintendent, Detention Jail, Deoli (Ajmer-Merwara).
- Lachlan Colvile Patrick MacAlpine Grant, Divisional Engineer, Telegraphs, Patna.
- Khan Bahadur Muhammad Abdul Kader Makawi, Merchant, Aden.
- Llewellyn Charles Fletcher Mathieson, Railway Concentration Officer, Army Headquarters, India.
- Walter Henry Meyrick, Planter and Estate Manager, Bihar and Orissa.
- Khan Bahadur Khwaja Abdur Rahman, Director of Public Health, Punjab.
- William Norman Richardson, MBE, Bombay Civil Service, City Magistrate, Karachi, Bombay.
- Robert Baker, Manager and Chief Engineer, Kowloon–Canton Railway, Hong Kong.
- Joseph Terence de la Mothe, Nominated Unofficial Member of the Legislative Council of Grenada, Windward Islands. For public services.
- George Gaggero, JP, Member of the City Council and formerly Unofficial Member of the Executive Council of Gibraltar. For public services.
- Harold George Hitchcock, MBE, formerly Chairman of the Railway Commission, Mauritius. For public services.
- John Arthur Stuart Jennings, JP. For public and charitable services in the Federated Malay States.
- Hugh Llewelyn Jones. For public services in Cyprus.
- Charles Norman Lewis, lately Member of the Expenditure Advisory Committee, Kenya. For public services.
- John Walker MacGillivray, Surveyor-General and Sub-Intendant of Crown Lands, Trinidad.
- George Maclean, MBE, MB, ChB, Sleeping Sickness Officer, Tanganyika Territory.
- Charles Victor Magill, Director of Posts & Telegraphs, Somaliland Protectorate.
- Henry Mason, Chief Accountant, Railway, Gold Coast.
- Ernest Alfred Nattriss, Deputy Head of the Shipping Department of the Crown Agents for the Colonies. For services as Shipping Officer to the Discovery Committee.
- Colin Raeburn, DSc, FGS, Assistant Director, Geological Survey Department, Nigeria.
- Harry Patrick Rice, Deputy Inspector General, Criminal Investigation Department, Palestine.
- Major Hubert Craddock Stevenson, MC, District Officer, Nigeria.
- John Trimingham Trimingham, Colonial Treasurer, Bermuda.
- James Turner, Collector of Customs, Malta.
- Captain Percy Redesdale Wardroper, MBE, Commissioner of Police, Northern Rhodesia.
- George Williams, Unofficial Member of the Executive Council and of the Legislative Council of St. Lucia, Windward Islands. For public services.
- Charles Campbell Woolley, MC, Officer of Class II of the Ceylon Civil Service.

Honorary Officer

- Selim Effendi Hanna, MBE, Assistant Superintendent of Police, Palestine.

==== Member of the Order of the British Empire (MBE) ====
Military Division

Royal Navy

- Signal Lieutenant William Thomas Burt.
- Boatswain Henry Havelock Cook.
- Warrant Master-at-Arms Albert Briggs Jenkins.
- Commissioned Engineer James Douglas Garden Bonham, DSM.
- Paymaster Lieutenant George Henry Iles, (Retd.)

Army

- Captain Stanley Acheson, Royal Army Service Corps.
- Captain (Deputy Commissary) Frederick William Austin, India Miscellaneous List, Quarter-Master-General's Branch, Army Headquarters, India.
- Captain Edwin Maurice Blake, Royal Engineers, Adjutant, Royal Bombay Sappers and Miners.
- No. 7718812 Warrant Officer, Class I, Superintending Clerk George Cody, Small Arms School Corps, Netheravon.
- No. 3434840 Warrant Officer, Class II, Company Sergeant-Major Thomas Augustine Cusack, 1st Battalion, The Lancashire Fusiliers, late Instructor, Straits Settlements Volunteer Force.
- No. 5429106 Warrant Officer, Class I, Regimental Sergeant-Major William Bartlett Fife, late 2nd Battalion, The Duke of Cornwall's Light Infantry.
- No. 5094464 Warrant Officer, Class II, Regimental Quartermaster-Sergeant James Gibbs, 1st Battalion, The Royal Warwickshire Regiment.
- No. 1852854 Warrant Officer, Class II, Mechanist Quartermaster-Sergeant Charles Francis Brind Green, Royal Engineers, Egypt.
- No. 5174418 Warrant Officer, Class II, Regimental Quartermaster-Sergeant Albert William Gregory, 6th Battalion, The Gloucestershire Regiment, Territorial Army.
- No. 5610627 Warrant Officer, Class II, Company Sergeant-Major George Charles Grimes, 4th Battalion, The Devonshire Regiment, Territorial Army.
- No. 2208084 Warrant Officer, Class II, Mechanist Quartermaster-Sergeant Henry Edward Harris, 27th (London) Anti-Aircraft Searchlight Battalion, Royal Engineers, Territorial Army.
- No. S/7249 Warrant Officer, Class I, Staff Sergeant-Major George Harry Heathcote, late Royal Army Service Corps, China.
- Conductor Bertram Holmes, Indian Corps of Clerks, India Unattached List, Superintending Clerk, Lucknow District, India.
- No. 2555438 Warrant Officer, Class II, Company Sergeant-Major William Henry Hooper, 54th (East Anglian) Divisional Signals, Royal Corps of Signals, Territorial Army.
- No. 1412943 Warrant Officer, Class II, Quartermaster-Sergeant Artillery Clerk Charles Joseph Lawrence, Royal Artillery, Eastern Command.
- No. 528320 Warrant Officer, Class II, Regimental Quartermaster-Sergeant Henry Albert Lee, The Northumberland Hussars, Territorial Army.
- Captain (Director of Music) George John Miller, LRAM, psm, Grenadier Guards.
- Captain (Deputy Commissary) Eugene William Newman, Indian Army Service Corps, No. 13 District Supply Company, Bombay.
- Lieutenant (Quarter-Master) Patrick Edward Nolan, Royal Corps of Signals (Indian Army), 1st Indian Divisional Signals, Rawalpindi.
- No. 4601997 Warrant Officer, Class II, Quartermaster-Sergeant (Orderly Room Sergeant) Thomas Norman, 1st Battalion, The Duke of Wellington's Regiment (West Riding).
- Warrant Officer, Class II, Company Sergeant-Major George Thomas Padgett, Hong Kong Volunteer Defence Corps.
- Captain Arthur Cyril Lawes Parry, MC, 2nd Battalion, The Green Howards (Alexandra, Princess of Wales's Own Yorkshire Regiment).
- Lieutenant (Quarter-Master) John Pemberton, half-pay, late attached The King's Own Malta Regiment.
- No. 7720735 Warrant Officer, Class I, Instructor (Educational) William McEwan Pirie, Army Educational Corps, Malta.
- No. 7574188 Warrant Officer, Class II, Staff Quartermaster-Sergeant Sidney Edward Richardson, 42nd (East Lancashire) Divisional Royal Army Ordnance Corps, Territorial Army.
- Risaldar & Honorary Captain Sardar Khan, 20th Lancers, Adjutant and Quarter-Master, Prince of Wales's Royal Indian Military College, Dehra Dun, India.
- No. 4961495 Warrant Officer, Class I, Regimental Sergeant-Major Arthur Stevenson, late 1st Battalion, The Sherwood Foresters (Nottinghamshire and Derbyshire Regiment).
- Sub-Conductor Gerald Bryan Urquhart, Indian Army Ordnance Corps, India Unattached List.
- No. T/27447 Warrant Officer, Class II, Company Sergeant-Major or (Acting Regimental Sergeant-Major) Charles Francis Vanderwerff, 44th (Home Counties) Divisional Royal Army Service Corps, Territorial Army.
- No. 2646398 Warrant Officer, Class I, Regimental Sergeant-Major Charles Edward Vaughan, 2nd Battalion, The Buffs (East Kent Regiment).
- Lieutenant (Quarter-Master) David Abraham Warman, 5th Battalion, The South Staffordshire Regiment, Territorial Army.
- No. S/3045 Warrant Officer, Class I, Staff Sergeant-Major John William Whelan, Royal Army Service Corps, Southern Command.
- Lieutenant Martin William Helenns White, 2nd Battalion, 9th Gurkha Rifles.
- No. 724515 Warrant Officer, Class II, Battery Sergeant-Major Reginald Frederick Wilson, 63rd (6th London) Field Brigade, Royal Artillery, Territorial Army.
- No. 743676 Warrant Officer, Class II, Battery Sergeant-Major John Hugh Woolhouse, 11th (Honourable Artillery Company & City of London Yeomanry) Brigade, Royal Horse Artillery, Territorial Army.

Honorary Member

- Kaid Abdul Rahman Arekat, Trans-Jordan Frontier Force.

Royal Air Force

- Flight Lieutenant Alexander Hutchinson Montgomery.
- Flight Lieutenant Francis Wilfrid Peter Dixon, MB, BS.
- Flight Lieutenant Thomas Henry Jolley, (Retd.)
- Warrant Officer Charles William Baker.
- Warrant Officer Herbert James Crane.
- Quartermaster (Honorary Flight Lieutenant) John Joseph Swift, Royal Australian Air Force.

Civil Division

- Charles Adams, Superintendent, Metropolitan Police.
- Allan Arneil, Inspector, Department of Health for Scotland.
- Henry Tweedale Ashworth, MM, Registrar, Colonial Office. Lately Registrar, Dominions Office.
- William Thomas Begley, First Class Clerk, Ministry of Health.
- William Baldwin Benham, Superintendent of Traffic, London Telephone Service.
- Harry Bolton, Clerk to the Sutton & Cheam Urban District Council.
- Alderman Walter Hineson Bowskin, Chairman of the Finance Committee, Borough of Kingston-upon-Thames.
- Archibald James Brinkley, Superintendent and Deputy Chief Constable, West Suffolk Constabulary.
- Leslie George Brown, Establishment Officer and Accountant, HM Passport Office.
- Margaret Jane Campbell, Mrs. Burnley Campbell. For services to Gaelic culture. A member of An Comunn Gàidhealach (The Highland Association).
- Joy Mary Barbara Carey, Clerical Officer, HM Treasury, and Personal Assistant to the Permanent Secretary.
- Ambrose Henri Chandler, Accountant, Board of Customs and Excise.
- John Elder Crofts, Superintendent, Wolverhampton Borough Police.
- Fannie Amelia Cullwick, Matron, Monyhull Mental Deficiency Colony.
- Florence Rose Davies, JP, Chairman of the Aberdare Juvenile Advisory Committee.
- Leonora Davies, JP, Joint Honorary Secretary of the South Wales Mining Areas Relief Fund. An active worker on behalf of the blind in South Wales.
- John Patrick Ferriss, District Inspector, Royal Ulster Constabulary.
- Maud Fitzwilliams, JP, Chairman of the Children's Sub-Committee of the South West Wales War Pensions Committee.
- Henry Fry, Senior Foreman, Engineering Department, Admiralty Dockyard, Devonport.
- Major Martin Glynn, lately Secretary of the Scottish Society for the Employment of Regular Soldiers, Sailors & Airmen.
- Cecil Charles Wemyss Goodale, Staff Officer, HM Office of Works & Public Buildings.
- James Gordon, Clerical Officer, India Office.
- Gifford Gray, Superintendent, Zetland County Police Force.
- James Gray, Chief Area Officer, Ministry of Pensions, Edinburgh.
- Frank Hardy, JP, Member of the National Savings Committee. Chairman of the Mansfield Local Savings Committee.
- Alderman Arthur William Hiscox, Chairman of the Lewisham Juvenile Advisory Committee.
- Alberta Elsie May Hopgood, Superintendent of Typists, Board of Trade.
- Lawrence Charles Jackson, Staff Officer, Grade II, Ministry of Transport.
- Sarah Jane Lambert, RRC, County Nursing Superintendent and Inspector of Midwives, Isle of Wight.
- Constance Mary Leckenby, Superintendent of Typists, Scottish Office.
- Eliza Loftus, Head Mistress, Foggathorpe Council School, East Riding.
- John William Macaree, Staff Clerk, Lord Chancellor's Department.
- Jean MacLeod, Matron, Newcastle upon Tyne Mental Hospital.
- David John Milne, First Class Officer, Ministry of Labour.
- Lily Mary Monteagle, FEIS, lately Head Teacher, Percy Street Special School, Glasgow.
- Charles Anthony Moorhouse, Assistant Postmaster, Manchester.
- William Harris Myles, Senior Marketing Officer, Ministry of Agriculture & Fisheries.
- William O'Shea, Assistant Superintendent, South Eastern Parcel Office, General Post Office.
- Doris Winifred Pearson, Assistant Secretary of the British Academy.
- Arthur St. John Phillips, Deputy City Commandant, Special Constabulary, Derry.
- Lancelot Rawes, Secretary, Surrey Education Conference. Formerly Head Master of the village school at Send, Surrey.
- Edgar Frederick Sewter, MusBac, ACP, Head Master, Halesworth Council School & Rural Pupil Teacher Centre, East Suffolk.
- Annie Isabel Shackle, Chief Superintendent of Typists, Dominions and Colonial Offices.
- John Shatwell, Staff Clerk, War Office.
- Alderman George Smith, JP, Chairman of the Doncaster, Mexborough & District War Pensions Committee, & also of the Children's Sub-Committee.
- Lewis Henry Stroud, Contracts Officer, Air Ministry.
- Councillor Helen Theilmann, JP. For political and public services in Kingston-upon-Hull.
- Harold Godwin Trayfoot, Inspector of Telegraph & Telephone Traffic, General Post Office.
- Alwyn Ieuan Tudor, Staff Officer, Home Office.
- Mary Anne Twentyman, Chairman of the Children's Sub-Committee of the Wolverhampton & District War Pensions Committee.
- William Calderwood Walker, Public Assistance Officer for the Cumberland County Council.
- Leonard Warren, Superintendent, Berkshire Constabulary.
- Jennins Attwooll Watts, MC, Assistant Principal, Ministry of Agriculture, Northern Ireland.
- William Arthur Reginald Webster, Tax Officer, Higher Grade, Board of Inland Revenue.
- Clarence Faithfull Monier-Williams, Senior Intelligence Officer, Department of Overseas Trade.
- John Edwin Woodford, Senior Staff Officer, Office of the Traffic Commissioners for the North Western Area.
- William John Thomas Yates, lately Higher Grade Clerk, Department of the Director of Public Prosecutions.
- Mary Margaret Scholastica Brown, Translator at His Majesty's Embassy at Santiago.
- Bertie John Catton, British Pro-Consul at Mersin.
- Alfred Coaster, Dredging Superintendent, Port of Basrah.
- Ethelbert Farmer, Archivist at His Majesty's Embassy, Bagdad.
- Dorothy Lester Macdonald, member of the British community at Santiago, Chile.
- Harold McCardell, British Vice-Consul at Santos.
- The Reverend Arthur Francis Nightengale, BD, a member of the British community in Panama.
- Leo Haydock Wilson, British Vice-Consul at Santiago de Cuba.
- Mabel Elsie Wolff, Inspectress of Midwives, Sudan.
- George Edward Ardill. For social welfare work in the State of New South Wales.
- John Austen, Chairman of Que Que Town Management Board, Southern Rhodesia.
- William Harry Bamford, lately Member of the Retail Bakers & Confectioners Advisory Committee of the Empire Marketing Board.
- Maud Rose Bonney. For the first solo flight by an Australian woman from Australia to England.
- Nellie Constance Morrice, Secretary to the Bush Nursing Association, State of New South Wales.
- Jane Power, lately Matron of the Mental Diseases Hospital, State of Tasmania.
- Sister Constance Stone, RRC. For nursing services in the Northern Territory of the Commonwealth of Australia.
- Ethel Mary Taylor. For social and rescue work at Bulawayo, Southern Rhodesia.
- Wallace Wyndham Waite, lately Member of the Food Products Committee and of the Retail Grocers Advisory Sub-Committee of the Empire Marketing Board.
- Julia Barbara Waugh. For philanthropic services in the Commonwealth of Australia.
- Thomas Wilkie, JP, lately Member of the Retail Grocers Advisory Sub-Committee of the Empire Marketing Board.
- Annie Maria Greenwood, Matron, British Military Families Hospital, Hyderabad, Sindh, Bombay.
- Sahibzada Haji Mohammed Dilawar Khan Abbasi, Army Minister, Bahawalpur, Punjab States.
- William Arthur Beer, Assistant to the Director of the Pasteur Institute, Coonoor, The Nilgiris, Madras.
- Harry Edwin Bloodworth, Officer Supervisor, Military Secretary's Branch, Army Headquarters, India.
- Bertram Cahill, Officer Supervisor, Quartermaster-General's Branch, Army Headquarters, India.
- Thomas Carter, Manager, Government of India Press, New Delhi.
- John D'Sylva, Deputy Superintendent of Police (Retd.), Bombay.
- Herbert Dudley, Director of Music, His Excellency the Governor's Band, Bengal.
- Thomas Joseph Gateley, Superintendent, Waterworks, Delhi.
- William Irwin Graham, Officer Supervisor, General Staff Branch, Army Headquarters, India.
- John Alexander Gunn, Manager of Whiteaway, Laidlaw & Co., Rangoon, Burma.
- Khan Bahadur Saiyid Hamid Husain Khan, Taluqdar and Honorary Magistrate, Lucknow, United Provinces.
- Khan Bahadur Abdul Jabbar Khan, Zaildar of Matta Moghal Khel, North-West Frontier Province.
- Mukand Lall, Military Engineer Services, Sub-Divisional Officer.
- Probodh Chandra Mustafi, Civil Engineer, The Tata Iron & Steel Co. Ltd., Bihar and Orissa.
- Major Frank Hermann Otto, Indian Medical Department, Assistant Surgeon on the Port Health Staff, Bombay.
- George Palmer, Head Clerk, Headquarters, Small Arms School (India).
- Patrick Lawrence O'Toole Quinn, Superintendent, Visapur Temporary Prison, Bombay.
- Ernest Cecil Rush, Inspector, Armed Police, Darjeeling, Bengal.
- Geoffrey Osmund Schmidt, Indian Medical Department, Assistant Surgeon, British Consulate, Kashgar.
- William James Placid Sidwell, Foreman, Tobacco Manufactures (India) Ltd., Monghyr, Bihar and Orissa.
- Rai Bahadur Babu Vikramajit Singh, MLC, Advocate, Cawnpore, United Provinces.
- Ernest John Lawrence Slynn, Personal Stenographer to His Excellency the Viceroy.
- Arcot Jaganatham Veeraswami, District Commissioner, Secunderabad Local Boy Scouts' Association, Hyderabad (Deccan).
- Antonio Alcoser, District Commissioner, British Honduras.
- Joseph Antoine Hermann Andre, MRCS, LRCP, Superintendent, Leper Asylum, Mauritius.
- John Beresford Beckles. For public services in Barbados.
- Walter Elias Broadway. For services to education and agriculture in Trinidad.
- Ernest Frederick Bryan, Assistant Engineer, Public Works Department, Nyasaland Protectorate.
- Norman Brandreth Casey, Superintendent of Prisons, Fiji.
- John Robert Dyer, Assistant Superintendent of Police, Tanganyika Territory.
- Arthur James Field, Assistant Establishment Officer, Kenya.
- Albert Edward Gardner, MM, Transport Officer, Police Department, Somaliland Protectorate.
- Gowardhan Lai, Clerk, Railways & Harbours, Kenya & Uganda.
- John Edward Seaton Griffiths, Assistant District Officer, Tanganyika Territory.
- Frederick George Harcourt, Curator of the Botanical Gardens and Agricultural Superintendent, Dominica, Leeward Islands.
- James Domone Kennedy, Sylviculturist, Nigeria.
- Frederick William Lane, Superintendent of Public Works, St. Helena.
- Andrew Buchanan Macdonald, MB, ChB. For devoted work in the treatment of lepers in Nigeria.
- Nanji Kalidas Mehta. For his contribution by commercial activities to the development of the Uganda Protectorate.
- Alfred Nicholls, Superintendent of Police & Prisons, St. Helena.
- Joseph Lennox Donation Pawan, MB ChB, Government Bacteriologist, Trinidad.
- Stanley Prosser, Inspector of Immigration, Palestine.
- Edmund Reimers, Archivist and Librarian, Ceylon.
- James Macrae Simpson, Assistant District Officer, Nigeria.
- Salem Subbukrishna Subrahmanyam, Examiner of Accounts, Treasury & Customs Department, Somaliland Protectorate.
- Sowani Puamau, First Native Medical Practitioner, Gilbert and Ellice Islands Colony, Western Pacific.
- Thomas Henry Stone, Chief Draughtsman, Engineering Department, Railways & Harbours, Kenya & Uganda.
- Albert Emeric Tuboku-Metzger, JP, President of the Sierra Leone Section of the National Congress of British West Africa. For public services.
- The Reverend George Turner Waldegrave, MA. For services in connection with Missions and in developing the Boy Scout movement in Hong Kong.
- Lawrence Timothy Yearwood. For public services in Barbados.

Honorary Members

- Abdel Rahman Bey el Taji, Member of the Supreme Moslem Council and of the Citrus Fruit Committee of the General Agricultural Council, Palestine.
- Dhalla Bhimji. For charitable services in the Tanganyika Territory.
- Yusuf Hajjar, MD, Medical Officer in Charge of the Government Hospital at Jerusalem, Palestine.
- Moshe Smilansky, Chairman, Jewish Farmers Federation, Palestine.

=== Medal of the Order of the British Empire ===
Military Division

For Meritorious Service

Royal Navy

- Sidney George Marsh, Leading Seaman O.N. C/J. 22855 (HM Submarine H32).
- William Frederick Spurging, Chief Petty Officer Writer O.N. C/M. 5285 (HMS Shoreham).

Army

- No. 56 Sergeant Bulasio Zake, Supply & Transport Corps, Northern Brigade, The King's African Rifles.
- No. 1026472 Sergeant James Harrow, Royal Artillery, Malta.
- No. 950 Lance-Sergeant Ndandala, MM, Bechuanaland Protectorate Police.
- No. 7868001 Staff Sergeant Instructor Walter Thomas Puplett, Royal Tank Corps, Tank Driving & Maintenance School.
- No. 7682190 Sergeant Albert Edward Smith, Corps of Military Police, Egypt.
- No. 1859054 Corporal Harry Miller Thomson, Royal Corps of Signals, India.
- No. 2309447 Company Quarter-master Sergeant (Foreman of Signals) William Arthur West, Royal Corps of Signals, China.

Royal Air Force

- 91023 Flight Sergeant Charles Edward Tucker.
- 246359 Flight Sergeant John Christopher Marshall.
- 357218 Corporal Edward Francis Hancock.

Civil Division

For Gallantry

- Abdus Samad Abdul Wahid Golandaz, Landlord, Property-owner and Sand Contractor, Bombay.

"Mr. Golandaz owns a fleet of boats and trained boatmen which he places at the disposal of the authorities whenever Surat, Rander or the surrounding districts are threatened by floods, and on frequent occasions he has risked his own life in leading his men to works of rescue. He has shown conspicuous personal bravery on several occasions. In particular on the 16th of September 1933, when the Tapti River had swollen to such proportions that one of the sluices in the city wall had been damaged and water was pouring in through it, threatening to flood the city, he volunteered to dive into the flooded river and ascertain the nature and extent of the damage. He accomplished this brave feat successfully and blocked the sluice with sandbags at considerable risk to his own life. In 1930 he had also performed an act of conspicuous bravery in rescuing the boys of the Government High School and the family of the Excise Inspector, whose bungalows had been cut off by the floods."

For Meritorious Service

- William Bunn, Office Keeper, Stormont Buildings, Ministry of Finance, Northern Ireland.
- Frederick Charles Cartwright, Head Assistant in the Investigation Branch of the Post Office.
- Frederick George Clark, Head Office Keeper, India Office.
- Charles Croft, Foreman at the School of Artillery.
- George Patrick William Keay, Head Messenger to the Postmaster General.
- Hector James McLennan, Sergeant, Royal Corps of Signals. Instructor, Wireless Group, Burma Military Police.
- Alfred Robert Henry Miller, Constable, Metropolitan Police. For courage and determination in arresting armed criminals.
- Wilfrid Ivor Randolph Wilkins, Constable, Metropolitan Police. For courage and determination in arresting armed criminals.
- Reginald Cyril Victor Mott, Constable, Palestine Police. For services during the disturbances in October and November 1933.
- John Murray, Constable, Palestine Police. For services during the disturbances in October and November 1933.
- Cyril Albert David Savory, Constable, Palestine Police. For services during the disturbances in October and November 1933.
- Thomas Opie, Head Gardener and Caretaker, Imperial War Graves Commission, France.
- John Montagu Pocock, Assistant Commander, Metropolitan Special Constabulary.
- Suleiman Gereis, Senior Instructor of Manual Training, Gordon College, Sudan.
- Abu Bakr Hassan, Assistant Locomotive Inspector, Sudan Railways.
- Bida Sule, Master, Grade I, Nigerian Marine.

=== Kaisar-i-Hind Medal ===
First Class, for Public Services in India

- Lena Adell Benjamin, Superintendent, American Baptist Mission Hospital for Women & Children, Nellore, Madras.
- Jeenabai Duggan (wife of Lieutenant-Colonel Jamshedji Nasarvanji Duggan, CIE, OBE, Professor of Ophthalmic Medicine & Surgery, Grant Medical College, and Superintendent, C. J. Ophthalmic Hospital), Bombay.
- Doris Louisa Graham, Medical Missionary, Krishnagar, Bengal.
- Eileen Mabel Holliday (wife of Honorary Brigadier J. C. H. Holliday, OBE, Indian Army (Retd.))
- Srimati Phulpati Kuer, Proprietress, Goldenganj Estate, Saran District, Bihar and Orissa.
- Gladys Elizabeth Littlewood, MBE, Indian Educational Service, Inspectress of Girls' Schools, North-West Frontier Province.
- Reverend Mother Mary Columba Sullivan, Superioress, St. Joseph's Presentation Convent, Quetta, Baluchistan.
- Millicent Vere Webb, Chief Medical Officer, Women's Medical Service, and Secretary of the Funds under the Presidency of Her Excellency the Countess of Willingdon.
- Sidney Lionel Marwood, Indian Civil Service, District Magistrate and Collector, Champaran, Bihar and Orissa.

=== Companion of the Imperial Service Order (ISO) ===
Home Civil Service

- Murdoch Beaton, General Inspector, Department of Health for Scotland.
- Alfred Graham Bell, Senior Examiner, Patent Office.
- John Lockton Bryan, MBE, Senior Staff Officer, Ministry of Agriculture & Fisheries.
- David Alfred Chart, LittD, Principal, Ministry of Finance, and Deputy Keeper, Public Record Office, Northern Ireland.
- Hugh Annan Corbet, Deputy Master of the Branch of the Royal Mint at Perth, Western Australia.
- Frank Coucher, Chief Accountant, Supreme Court Pay Office.
- Aubrey Culley, Assistant Principal Clerk, Office of the Controller of Stamps, Board of Inland Revenue.
- Alphonso William James Davies, MBE, Clerk in Charge, Greenwich Hospital Department, Admiralty.
- Alfred Featherstonhaugh, First Class Officer, Ministry of Labour.
- Alec Robert Gibbs, MInstCE, AMIMechE, Superintending Civil Engineer, Air Ministry.
- William Gladstone Gilbert, Deputy Comptroller and Accountant General, General Post Office.
- Frederick Mayes, Senior Staff Officer, Ministry of Health.
- Charles Scott Nicoll, Assistant, Librarian's Department, Foreign Office.
- Alfred Leonard Screech, OBE, Director of Accounts, HM Stationery Office.
- James William Simmons, Inspector, First Class, Board of Customs and Excise.
- Ernest Graham Williams, MBE, Senior Staff Officer, Mines Department.

Dominions

- Lewis Findlay East, Secretary, Marine Branch, Department of Commerce, Commonwealth of Australia.
- John Henry Osborn Eaton, Engineer-in-Chief, State of South Australia.
- Charles Herbert Palmer Robinson, lately Principal Parliamentary Reporter, Commonwealth of Australia.
- Ward George Wohlmann, Commissioner of Police, Dominion of New Zealand.
- Arthur Herbert Wright, Secretary and Accountant, Office of the Agent General in London for the State of Victoria.

Indian Civil Services

- M.R.Ry. Rao Bahadur Kanthadai Rangaswami Ayyangar Avargal, Deputy Superintendent of Police, Madras.
- John Carter, MBE, Personal Assistant to His Excellency the Commander-in-Chief in India.
- Mohanlal Kahandas Dalai, Head Clerk, Office of the District Superintendent of Police, Ahmedabad, Bombay.
- Cyril Brook Duckworth, Superintendent, Office of the Inspector-General of Civil Hospitals, Bihar and Orissa.
- Babu Manindra Gopal Ghosh, Judicial Head Assistant, Commissioner's Office, Bhagalpur, Bihar and Orissa.
- William Robert Hewitt, Office Supervisor and Personal Assistant to the Quartermaster-General in India.
- Albert Victor Jones, Assistant Secretary to the Government of Assam, Finance and Revenue Departments.
- Charles Reginald Nicholas, Personal Assistant to the Commissioner, Sagaing Division, Burma.
- Rai Sahib Lala Ram Sahai, Sub-Assistant Surgeon, Residency Hospital, Indore, Central India.

Colonies, Protectorates, &c.

- Charles Francis Bristow, lately Superintendent in charge of Stores & Accounts Branch, Police Department, Kenya.
- John Francis Fernandez, lately Book-keeper, Treasury, Uganda Protectorate.
- Walter Mortimer Fraser, lately Treasurer, Jamaica.
- Gordon EastLey Greig, ARSM, lately Senior Warden of Mines, Federated Malay States.
- Gordon Edward William Jansz, Chief Accountant, Government Railway, Ceylon.
- Magnus Johannes Oyedele Macauley, Under Sheriff of the Colony, Sierra Leone.
- Arthur Robert Sutherland, MA, Inspector of Schools, Hong Kong.
- James Pogson Turner, Chief Registrar of the Colony, and Registrar of Antigua, Leeward Islands.

=== Imperial Service Medal ===
In recognition of long and meritorious service in the Indian Civil Services

- Masukhan Bijarkhan, Retired Havildar in the Office of the Chief Engineer in Sind, Bombay.
- Chowdhury, Retired Jemadar of the Office of the Private Secretary to His Excellency the Viceroy.
- Isaac Whitten, Home Service, late Messenger to the High Commissioner for India, London.

=== King's Police Medal (KPM) ===
For Gallantry

- Hassan Mohammed Effendi Khatib, Assistant Superintendent, Palestine Police.
- Alan Edward Sigrist, British Inspector, Palestine Police.
- Constable Abdallah Shibley Zaher, Palestine Police.

=== Royal Red Cross (RRC) ===
==== Associate of the Royal Red Cross (ARRC) ====
- Margaret Alice Wilson-Green, Lady Superintendent, Queen Alexandra's Military Nursing Service for India, in recognition of the special devotion to duty and competency displayed by her in the performance of her nursing duties in India.

=== Honorary Chaplains to His Majesty ===
- The Reverend Marten William Shewell, MA, Chaplain to the Forces, 1st Class
- The Reverend Howard Gabb Marshall, MA, Chaplain to the Forces, 1st Class

Additional Honorary Chaplain to The King

- The Reverend Joseph Firth, MC, Staff Chaplain, Royal Air Force.

=== Air Force Cross (AFC) ===
- Squadron Leader Francis Joseph Fogarty, DFC.
- Flight Lieutenant Guy Lloyd Carter.

=== Air Force Medal (AFM) ===
- 973 Flight Sergeant William Robert McCleery.
- 364249 Sergeant Pilot Edward Norman Rooms.
