= Murrie =

Murrie can be a given name or a surname. Notable people with the name include:

== Given name ==
- Murrie Batt (born 1953), Australian rules footballer

== Surname ==
- Bruce Murrie (fl. 1941), co-creator of M&M's
- Eleanore Boswell Murrie, American scholar of English literature
- Richard Murrie (born 1955), Australian rules footballer
- William Murrie, Scottish civil servant
