= Permanent Under-Secretary of State for Scotland =

Permanent Under-Secretaries for Scotland in HM Civil Service

This is a list of Permanent Under-Secretaries for Scotland in the Civil Service. It should not be confused with the Parliamentary Under-Secretary of State for Scotland.

== Office ==
The political office of Secretary for Scotland was established in 1885 along with the establishment of the Scottish Office. In line with the secretaryship, a permanent under-secretaryship was created, to be occupied by a civil servant. The first office-holder was Francis Sandford. When the political office became the Secretary of State for Scotland in 1926, the permanent secretary also became Permanent Under-Secretary of State.

== Permanent Under-Secretaries (of State) for Scotland ==
The following were Permanent Under-Secretaries (of State) for Scotland:

- 1885–1887: Sir Francis Sandford (later Baron Sandford).
- 1888–1892: Robert Cochran-Patrick.
- 1892–1902: Colonel Sir Colin Scott-Moncrieff
- 1902–1908: Sir Reginald Macleod of Macleod
- 1909–1921: Sir James Miller Dodds
- 1921–1933: Sir John Lamb (Under-Secretary of State after 1926)
- 1933–1937: Sir John Jeffrey
- 1937: John Elborn Highton
- 1937–1946: Sir Horace Hamilton
- 1946–1959: Sir David Milne
- 1959–1964: Sir William Murrie
- 1965–1973: Sir Thomas Douglas Haddow
- 1973–1978: Sir Nicholas Godfrey Morrison
- 1978–1988: Sir William Kerr Fraser
- 1988–1998: Sir Robert Hillhouse
- 1998–1999: Alastair Muir Russell

== Heads of the Scottish departments (Secretary grade) ==
The Scottish Office was unusual in that it was federal in arrangement; the Secretary of State oversaw several separate Scottish departments via the Scottish Office; those departments were headed by a Secretary who was responsible directly to the Secretary of State, but would meet with the Permanent Under-Secretary of State at the Scottish Office regularly. The following is a list of those secretaries.

=== Secretary, Scottish Office Agriculture, Environment and Fisheries Department ===
The Board of Agriculture for Scotland, which had been founded in 1912, was replaced in 1928 by the Department of Agriculture for Scotland with a new permanent secretary. Responsibility for fisheries was added in 1960 from the Scottish Home Department, and the department was then renamed the Department of Agriculture and Fisheries for Scotland. In 1991, it was renamed the Scottish Office Agriculture and Fisheries Department. In 1995, it was again renamed to the Scottish Office Agriculture, Environment and Fisheries Department.

As Board of Agriculture for Scotland

- 1912–1918: Hugh Morison Conacher.
- 1918–1928: Charles Weatherill

As Department of Agriculture for Scotland

- 1928–1934: Sir Robert Blyth Greig
- 1934–1953: Sir Patrick Ramsay Laird
- 1953–1958: Sir Alexander Glen
- 1958–1960: Sir Matthew Campbell

As Department of Agriculture and Fisheries for Scotland (from 1991 Scottish Office Department of Agriculture and Fisheries)

- 1960–1968: Sir Matthew Campbell
- 1968–1971: Harry Whitby
- 1971: William George Pottinger
- 1972–1984: James Ian Smith
- 1984–1992: Loudon Pearson Hamilton
- 1992–1995: Kenneth John Mackenzie

As Scottish Office Agriculture, Environment and Fisheries Department

- 1995–1998: Alastair Muir Russell
- 1998–1999: John Strathie Graham

=== Secretary, Scottish Office Development Department (1962–1999) ===
Created in 1962 as the Scottish Development Department, it was renamed in 1991, becoming the Scottish Office Environment Department, but reverted to being the Scottish Office Development Department in 1995.

As Scottish Development Department

- 1962–1964: Thomas Douglas Haddow
- 1965–1973: Sir Alan Blythe Hume
- 1973–1976: Kenneth Newis
- 1976–1980: Eric Gillett
- 1980–1987: Tony Richard Hillier Godden
- 1987–1990: Robert Gavin Loudon McCrone

As Scottish (Office) Environment Department

- 1991–1992: Robert Gavin Loudon McCrone
- 1992–1995: Harold Hernshaw Mills

As Scottish Office Development Department

- 1995–1998: Harold Hernshaw Mills
- 1998–1999: Kenneth John Mackenzie

=== Secretary, Scottish Office Industry Department (1973–1995) ===
Created in 1973 as the Scottish Economic Planning Department. It was renamed the Scottish Industry Department in 1983, and, like all departments it was prefixed with "Scottish Office" in 1991. The department's portfolio was merged with the Education Department in 1995.

- 1973–1980: Tony Richard Hillier Godden
- 1980–1983: Robert Gavin Loudon McCrone

As Scottish (Office) Industry Department

- 1983–1987: Robert Gavin Loudon McCrone
- 1987–1990: James Archibald Scott
- 1990–1995: Peter Mackay

=== Secretary, Scottish Office Education and Industry Department ===
Formed in 1872 as the Scotch Education Department, renamed Scottish Education Department in 1918, Scottish Office Education Department in 1991 and Scottish Office Education and Industry Department in 1995.

- 1872–1884: Francis Sandford (later Baron Sandford).
- 1884–1885: Patrick Cumin.
- 1885–1904: Sir Henry Craik
- 1904–1921: Sir John Struthers
- 1922–1928: Sir George Macdonald
- 1928–1936: Sir William Wallace McKechnie
- 1936–1940: Sir James Wallace Peck
- 1940–1952: Sir John Mackay Thomson (acting 1939)
- 1952–1957: Sir William Stuart Murrie
- 1964–1973: Sir Norman Graham
- 1973–1976: John Martin Fearn
- 1976–1984: John Angus Macbeth Mitchell
- 1984–1987: James Archibald Scott
- 1988–1999: Gerald Robertson Wilson

=== Secretary, Department of Health for Scotland (1929–1962) ===
The Board of Health was established in 1919. In 1928, it became the Department of Health for Scotland, and merged with the Department of Health for Scotland in 1962 to form the Scottish Home and Health Department (see below).

As Scottish Board of Health

- 1919–1928: John Jeffrey

As Department of Health for Scotland

- 1929–1933: John Jeffrey
- 1933–1937: John Elborn Highton
- 1937–1939: William Scott Douglas
- 1939–1943: William Robert Fraser
- 1943–1953: Sir George Henry Henderson
- 1953–1956: Harold Ross Smith
- 1956–1959: Sir John Anderson
- 1959–1962: Thomas Douglas Haddow

=== Secretary, Scottish Home Department (1939–1962) ===
Established in 1939 to take over functions of the Scottish Office, the Fishery Board for Scotland, and the Prisons Department for Scotland. Merged with the Department of Health for Scotland in 1962 to form the Scottish Home and Health Department (see below).

- 1939–1942: Robert Norman Duke (on secondment with the Scottish Civil Defence Regional Office from September 1939)
- 1942–1946: Sir David Milne
- 1946–1948: Robert Norman Duke
- 1948–1957: Sir Charles Cunningham
- 1957–1959: Sir William Stuart Murrie
- 1959–1962: Sir John Anderson

=== Secretary, Scottish Office Home and Health Department ===
Formed by merger of the Scottish Home Department and the Department of Health for Scotland in 1962. It was renamed the Scottish Office Home and Health Department in 1991, and split up into the Scottish Office Health Department and the Scottish Office Home Department in 1995.

- 1963–1972: Sir Ronald Ernest Charles Johnson
- 1972–1977: Ronald Petrie Fraser
- 1977–1984: Archibald Louden Rennie
- 1984–1990: William Reid
- 1990–1992: Graham Allan Hart
- 1992–1995: James Hamill

In 1995, the department was subsequently split into the Scottish Office Home Department and the Scottish Office Health Department. Hamill remained Secretary and Head of the Home Department, and was appointed CB in 1997. He was still in the office in 1999, when it was abolished on the formation of the devolved Scottish Executive.

After 1995, the new Health Department had no secretary, but comprised several branches: the Management Executive for NHS in Scotland (the Chief Executive from 1993 to 1999 was Geoffrey Richard Scaife, CB), the Office of the Chief Scientist, the Public Health Policy Unit (the head of which was the Chief Medical Officer), Medical Services (also headed by the Chief Medical Officer) and Nursing Services (headed by the Chief Nursing Officer).

=== Secretary, Prisons Department for Scotland (1929–1939) ===
The Prisons Department was established by the Reorganisation of Offices (Scotland) Act 1928; it was abolished by the Reorganisation of Offices (Scotland) Act 1939, and its functions were transferred to the newly established Scottish Home Department.

- 1929–1935: Lt-Col. Randolph Baird
- 1936–1939: Lt-Col. William Leith-Ross

== Deputy Secretary, Central Services (1974–1991) ==
The Deputy Secretary, Central Services, ranked equally with the Secretaries of each of the Departments, and formed part of the Scottish Office's management group (along with the Secretaries and Permanent Under-Secretary). The office-holder was responsible for matters of devolution, as well as the financial management of the Office and local authority finance.

The office was established in response to the devolution policies of the Second Wilson Ministry; "it became imperative to create devolution units at high level but separate from the departments". The first appointment was Kerr Fraser, who held the post between 1975 and 1978. The office was abolished in 1991, after Ian Penman left. Responsibility for local government finance was transferred to the Environment Department (formerly the Development Department), while management responsibilities were vested in Gerry Wilson, secretary of the Education Department; this latter arrangement was not intended to be permanent, but reflected the "relative workload" of the different grade 2 officials.

- 1975–1978: William Kerr Fraser
- 1978–1984: William Reid
- 1984–1991: Ian Dalgleish Penman
