= James S. Jeffrey =

Scottish surgeon

James S. Jeffrey MD, FRCSEd
- Born: James Sneddon Jeffrey; 12 August 1904; Edinburgh, Scotland
- Died: 30 May 1989 (aged 84); Edinburgh, Scotland
- Education: George Watson's College; University of Edinburgh
- Occupation: Surgeon
- Known for: Research on Penicillin in war wounds
- Medical career
- Profession: General surgeon
- Institutions: Royal Infirmary of Edinburgh

James Sneddon Jeffrey, MD, FRCSEd (12 August 1904 - 30 May 1989) was a Scottish surgeon who worked for most of his career at the Royal Infirmary of Edinburgh (RIE). During the Second World War, as Colonel in the Royal Army Medical Corps (RAMC), he was appointed "Surgical Penicillin Officer" in the Eighth Army in North Africa. In this capacity he was involved in the very earliest assessment of the use of Penicillin in war wounds. His reports concluded that Penicillin in this context, should be used early in the treatment of infected wound rather than at the later stage of chronic suppuration.

== Early life ==
James Jeffrey was born in Polwarth, a district of Edinburgh, son of Sir John Jeffrey, later Permanent Under Secretary of State for Scotland, and his wife Jean Stuart Jeffrey (née Sneddon). He went to school at George Watson's College, from where he went on to study at the University of Edinburgh Arts Faculty, graduating Master of Arts (MA) in 1925. He then studied medicine at the University of Edinburgh Medical School qualifying MB ChB. During his time at University he was president of the Edinburgh University Union and president of the Students' Representative Council. He was awarded a university blue for rugby union. In 1938 he was elected a member of the Harveian Society of Edinburgh.

== Surgical career ==
In 1939 he was awarded the degree of Doctor of Medicine (MD), for a thesis entitled Regional ileitis: a clinical and experimental study. 'Regional ileitis' was the term then in use for what is now generally called Crohn's disease. Although there had been earlier descriptions, most notably that by Sir Kennedy Dalziel, it was Burrill B Crohn and his colleagues in a seminal 1932 paper who gave the first comprehensive account of the clinical and pathological features. Crohn and his colleagues considered that 'terminal ileum is alone involved' while Jeffrey like Richard Lewisohn was to show that other parts of the gastro-intestinal tract could also be involved.

== War service ==
Jeffrey was called up in 1939 and served as a major in the Royal Army Medical Corps (RAMC) with the British Expeditionary Force in France and was evacuated from Quiberon Bay back to England. He then served with the RAMC in West Africa and later in Tripoli with the Eighth Army. During that posting, Professor Howard Florey and Professor Hugh Cairns arrived from Oxford bringing with them 'most of Britain's Penicillin production' for it to be assessed in the treatment of battle wounds, as wound infection in this situation was a common problem. Jeffrey was promoted to Lt Colonel and appointed Surgical Penicillin Officer in the team which carried out the assessment. The initial report on 15 casualties was given by Pulvertaft in 1943. The full results were published in the British Medical Journal, as one of the first accounts of the use of Penicillin in battle wounds. In this report he emphasised that the use of Penicillin did not remove the need for early and thorough wound debridement, and this was endorsed by the War Office report on its use in war wounds. After the war Jeffrey published a review on the place of Penicillin in military surgery.

=== Post war career ===
On demobilisation he became consultant surgeon in the RIE and Chalmers Hospital. In 1964 he was elected a member of the Aesculapian Club.

== Family ==
He met Mary Goldthwaite from Montgomery, Alabama in 1938 while working as a ship's doctor on a Cunard liner. They married on 12 August 1939. They had three daughters and one son. Jeffrey died in Edinburgh on 30 May 1989.
