= Arnold Robinson =

Arnold Robinson may refer to:

- Arnold Percy Robinson (1879–1960), British lawyer
- Arnold Wathen Robinson (1888–1955), English stained glass artist
- Arnie Robinson (1948–2020), American athlete
- Arnold Robinson, a fictional character on the British political satire sitcom Yes Minister
