= Weatherhead (disambiguation) =

A weatherhead is a weatherproof entry point for overhead powerlines and telephone lines into a building.

Weatherhead may also refer to:

- Weatherhead (surname)
- Weatherhead School of Management
- Weatherhead East Asian Institute, at Columbia University, USA
- Weatherhead High School, Merseyside, UK
