= Congested Districts Board (Scotland) =

The Congested Districts Board (Scotland) was set up by the Congested Districts (Scotland) Act, 1897 for the purpose of administering the sums made available by the British Government for the improvement of congested districts in the Highlands and Islands.

Formally titled the Congested Districts (Scotland) Commissioners, the Board consisted of the Secretary for Scotland, the Under-Secretary for Scotland, the Chairman (or Convenor) of the Local Government Board for Scotland, the Chairman of the Fishery Board for Scotland, the Chairman of the Crofters' Commission, and up to three other people nominated by the Secretary for Scotland

The main aims of the Board were to aid and develop agriculture (for instance, by distributing seed potatoes and seed oats, and supplying stud animals); the fishing industry (for instance, by improving lighthouses, piers and harbours); and home industries such as spinning and weaving. It was also intended to improve roads and bridges, and aid the migration of crofters to other parts of Scotland. The Board was modeled on the Congested Districts Board for Ireland (the CDB), which had been officially established by The Rt Hon. Arthur Balfour, P.C., M.P., who was then serving as the Chief Secretary for Ireland.

An example of their work was the construction of a small jetty and slip on Hirta, St Kilda, between 1899 and 1901. Though this project had been discussed by the Board of Trade, the Admiralty and the owner (Macleod of Macleod) for many years, it was only really the petition of the community and their minister and the creation of the CDB that prompted action. The project was undertaken by Scottish Office engineers with St Kildan labour, but fully funded and administered by the CDB.

The Board was abolished by section 28 of the Small Landholders (Scotland) Act 1911, and its powers and duties transferred to the Board of Agriculture for Scotland established by section 4 of that Act. Most of the 1897 Act however remains in force, with the functions now in the hands of the Scottish Ministers.

== Membership ==
Alongside the ex officio commissioners, the commissioners nominated by the Secretary for Scotland were-

1897

- Sir Kenneth Smith Mackenzie, Bart., of Gairloch, Ross-shire.
- Mr. James Forsyth, of Quinish, Argyllshire.
- Mr. William Mackenzie, Trantlemore, Forsinard, Sutherlandshire.

1900

- Captain Norman Magnus MacLeod of MacLeod, C.M.G., in place of Sir Kenneth Mackenzie

== See also ==
- Congested Districts Board for Ireland
