= Norman Graham (civil servant) =

Scottish civil servant

Sir Norman William Graham, CB FRSE (1913–2010) was a 20th century Scottish civil servant particularly remembered for his senior roles in the Scottish Education Department (SED). He was a major influence on Scottish health and education in the second half of the 20th century.

== Life ==
He was born in Dundee on 11 October 1913 the son of a marine engineer. He was raised in Glasgow and educated at Hyndland Primary School then Glasgow High School where he was school dux.

He studied history at Glasgow University from 1931, graduating MA (Hons) in 1935 and gaining a second MA in Classics in June 1936.

In the autumn of 1936 he joined the Department of Health for Scotland and was Private Secretary to Permanent Secretary Sir William Murrie. This role was based in St Andrews House on the south side of Calton Hill in Edinburgh. However he continued to live in Glasgow, allowing him to pursue golf and rugby with his friends and to oversee the boys' club at the Pearce Institute in Govan with his friend Rev George MacLeod.

In the Second World War he relocated to London initially as Private Secretary to Sir Horace Hamilton in the Scottish Office then as Principal Private Secretary to both Lord Beaverbrook and Stafford Cripps in the Ministry of Aircraft Production. In this capacity he was sent to the United States to persuade them to transfer contracts already made with France to Britain instead. He was in charge of Beaverbrook's Spitfire Fund and helped set up an aeronautic training centre which later became Cranfield University.

After the war he became Assistant Secretary for the Department of Health for Scotland. In this capacity he had to organise the fate of the smaller community hospitals, which in Scotland were critical as the general hospitals could not take the whole burden of Scottish health at that time. Although many local hospitals were private benefactions specifically for local community use, the DHS managed to acquire almost all hospitals for the new National Health Service using the argument that all served the needs of community health (this decision complicated the future NHS sales of these "gifted properties" as most were held in trust by NHS rather than owned). He was also responsible for setting up the Regional Health Boards such as Lothian Health Board.

In 1956 he succeeded Douglas Haddow as Under Secretary to the Scottish Home and Health Department and in this role, due to his previous links, was in charge of establishing new regional hospitals such as Ninewells Hospital in Dundee. He was also responsible for reorganising mental health care in Scotland, widening its scope from the previous focus on Bangour Village Hospital. He was created a Commander of the Order of the Bath (CB) in the 1961 Birthday Honours for his services to Scottish Health.

In 1964 became Secretary to the Scottish Education Department, succeeding Sir William Arbuckle. This move coincided with the Labour Party control of the country under Harold Wilson. The promised autonomy of the Scottish education system (guaranteed in the Act of Union 1707) was held not to apply in this capacity and the Labour push for comprehensive schools was rolled out. Graham had to look at the ongoing practice of local schools charging fees. Some schools, such as his alma mater Glasgow High School had to abolish all fees or lose their government funding. This move drew a clear line between self-supporting (fee-paying) private schools, and free state schools. Later his prime task was the updating of the school curriculum and the raising of the minimum school leaving age from 14 to 16. This change raised the expectations of what was required from teachers and required more classrooms and teachers to accommodate the additional numbers of students created in this change. In combination with the baby boom most schools required expansion. This took years to organise and only came in as law in 1973. Graham also oversaw the creation of weekday hostel accommodation for secondary school children from the Scottish islands who had to come to the mainland for education. From 1966 to 1969 he worked with Lord Wheatley on the Royal Commission on Local Government in Scotland setting out how local authorities would administer schools and education.

In relation to tertiary (university) education the Robbins Report of 1964 expanded the number of Scottish Universities from 4 to 8. Graham was involved in the administration of this process. The largest of these new universities was Strathclyde University but also creating Stirling University as a wholly new entity. In Edinburgh Heriot Watt College was upgraded to Heriot-Watt University and in Dundee the satellite branch of St Andrews University was given independent status as Dundee University. Both Stirling and Heriot-Watt awarded him honorary doctorates.

He was knighted for services to the country by Queen Elizabeth II in the 1971 Birthday Honours. In 1972 he was elected a Fellow of the Royal Society of Edinburgh.

He retired in 1973 at age 60. In 1974. linked to his love of golf he was created Chairman of the newly created St Andrews Links Trust, overseeing the running of the several golf courses in St Andrews (including the Royal and Ancient). When he retired from this role in 1984 he was given free membership of all these clubs for life.

He died in North Berwick on 25 February 2010.

== Family ==
In 1949 he married Catherine ("Kitty") Mary Strathie. They had two sons and one daughter.

From 1952 until retirement they lived in a custom-built house on Kings Road in Longniddry, east of Edinburgh, designed by Edinburgh architects Reiach & Hall.
