= Vincent Stow =

English cricketer and educator (1883–1968)

Personal information
- Full name: Vincent Aubrey Stewart Stow
- Born: 27 July 1883; Kensington, London, England
- Died: 21 April 1968 (aged 84); St Pancras, London, England
- Batting: Unknown
- Role: Wicket-keeper

Domestic team information
- Years: Team
- 1904: Oxford University
- 1905: Marylebone Cricket Club

Career statistics
Competition	First-class
Matches	3
Runs scored	47
Batting average	11.75
100s/50s	–/–
Top score	23
Catches/stumpings	2/–
- Source: Cricinfo, 2 August 2019

Vincent Aubrey Stewart Stow CIE (27 July 1883 – 21 April 1968) was an English first-class cricketer and educator.

The son of Stewart Smith Stow, he was born at Kensington in July 1883. He was educated at Winchester College, before studying at Exeter College, Oxford. While studying at Oxford, he made his debut in first-class cricket in a trial match for Oxford University against Worcestershire at Worcester in 1904. The following year he played a first-class match for the Gentlemen of England against Oxford University at Oxford. In July of the same year he toured North America with the Marylebone Cricket Club, making a single first-class appearance on the tour against the Gentlemen of Philadelphia at Haverford.

After graduating from Oxford, he became a schoolteacher. He taught at Marlborough College in 1906, before moving to British India in 1907 where he taught in Indore at the Daly College, before becoming principle at the Rajkumar College in Rajkot in 1912 and again from 1919–31. He became the principal of Mayo College in Ajmer in 1931, holding the post until 1943. Stow was made a Companion of the Order of the Indian Empire in the 1934 Birthday Honours. He later returned to England, where he died at St Pancras in April 1968. He was the last surviving member of the 1905 Marylebone Cricket Club touring party.
