= Weatherhead (surname) =

Weatherhead is a surname. Notable people with the surname include:

- A.E. Weatherhead, British colonial administrator
- Betsy Weatherhead, American atmospheric scientist
- Bruce Weatherhead, Australian graphic designer, business partner of Alex Stitt
- Christopher Weatherhead, Northampton University student who served a prison sentence for hacking
- David Weatherhead (1928–2012), Canadian politician
- Ian Weatherhead (born 1932), English watercolour artist
- James Weatherhead (1931–2017), minister of the Church of Scotland
- John Weatherhead (Royal Navy officer) (1775–1797)
- Leslie Weatherhead (1893–1976), English theologian
- Shaun Weatherhead (born 1970), English footballer
