= John Jeffrey (civil servant) =

Scottish civil servant

Sir John Jeffrey KCB, CBE, FRSE (1872 – 19 June 1947) was a Scottish civil servant. Born in Chirnside, Berwickshire, he served as Secretary to the Department of Health for Scotland in 1929 and Permanent Under-Secretary of State for Scotland from 1933 to 1937. He held long associations relating to public health and poor law during his career. He was appointed a Commander of the Order of the British Empire (CBE) in the 1927 Birthday Honours, and a Knight Commander of the Order of the Bath (KCB) in the 1934 Birthday Honours.

In 1937 he served as a member of the executive committee for the Arrangements of the Coronation of Their Majesties (King George VI and Queen Elizabeth). He was Chairman of the General Board of Control for Scotland, the body responsible for overseeing mental health services and asylums, from 1939 until his retirement in 1945.

He published article in 1939 analysing the trend toward centralisation of Scottish administration within the ministerial system The Origin and Growth of the Government Departments Concerned with Scottish Affairs in the journal Public Administration.

He was elected as a Fellow of the Royal Society of Edinburgh. He married Jean Stuart Jeffrey (née Sneddon), and his son James Jeffrey became a prominent Scottish surgeon.
