= Abdus Samad Abdul Wahid Golandaz =

Indian landowner

Abdus-Samad Abdul-Wahid Golandaz GC was an Indian landowner who received the Empire Gallantry Medal (later converted to the George Cross), the highest non-combat gallantry decoration of the British Empire, in the 1934 Birthday Honours.

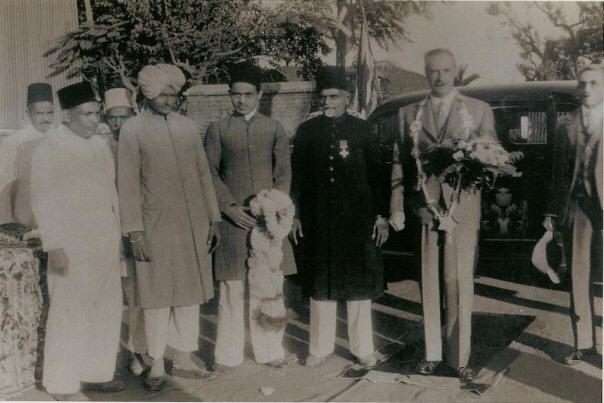
Abdul Samad Golandaz on receiving Empire Gallantry Medal (King George Cross)

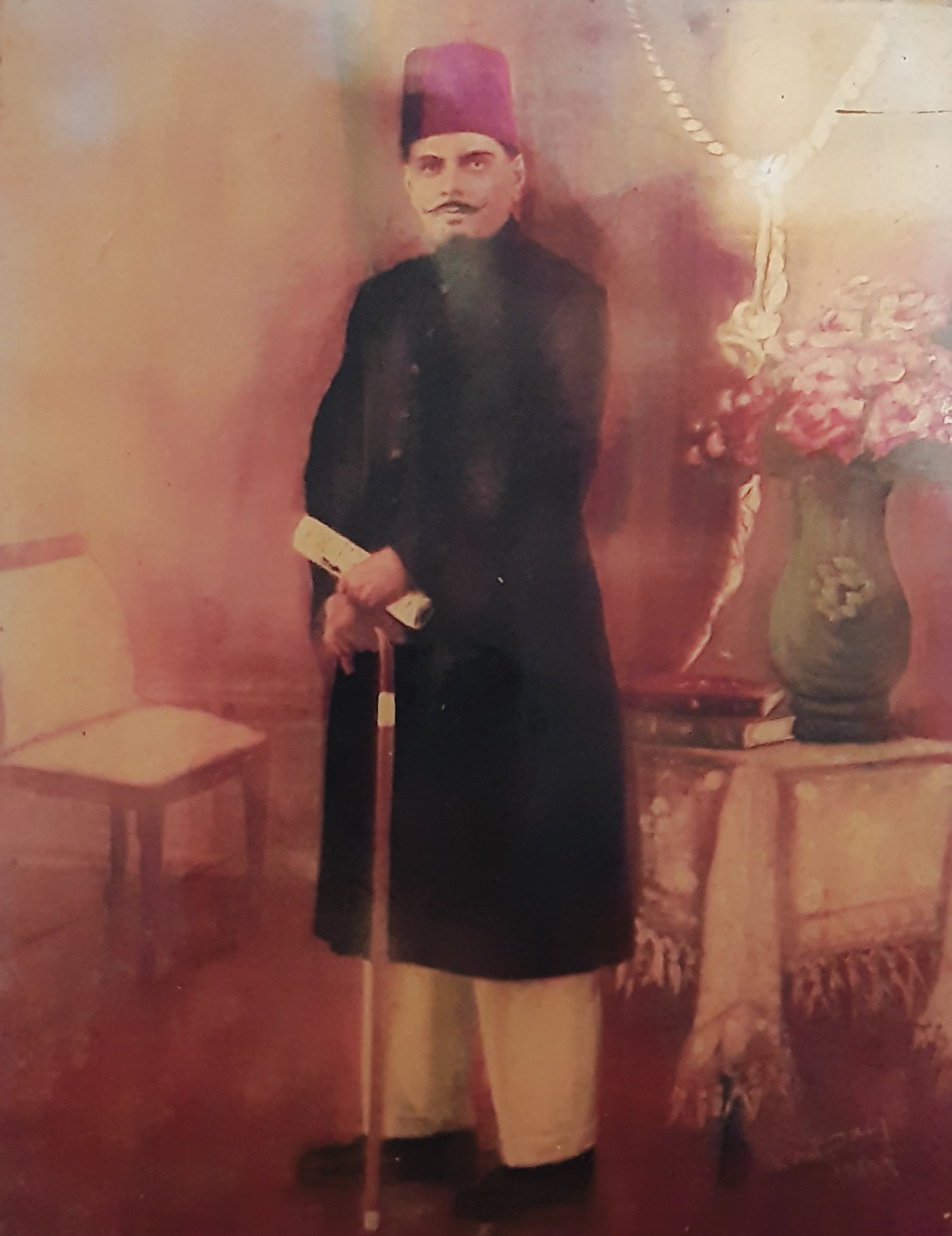
Abdus Samad Abdul Wahid Golandaz

== Citation for the Empire Gallantry Medal ==
Abdus Samad Abdul Wahid Golandaz, Land-lord, Property Owner and Sand Contractor, Bombay. Mr. Golandaz owns a fleet of boats and trained boatmen which he places at the disposal of the authorities whenever Surat, Rander or the surrounding districts are threatened by the floods, and on frequent occasions he has risked his own life in leading his men to works of rescue. He has shown conspicuous personal bravery on several occasions. In particular on the 16th of September 1933, when the Tapti River had swollen to such proportions that one of the sluices in the city wall had been damaged and water was pouring in through it, threatening to flood the city, he volunteered to dive into the flooded river and ascertain the nature and extent of the damage. He accomplished this brave feat successfully and blocked the sluice with sandbags at considerable risk to his own life. In 1930 he had also performed an act of conspicuous bravery in rescuing the boys of the Government High School and the family of the Excise Inspector, whose bungalows had been cut off by the floods.

== Sources ==
- The Register of the George Cross (2nd ed.). Cheltenham: This England Books. 1990. ISBN 978-0-90632-417-2.
- Ashcroft, Michael (2012). George Cross Heroes. London: Hachette UK. ISBN 978-0-75536-452-7.
