= Singapore Time =

Time zone

- Time zone

UTC offset
- SST: UTC+08:00

Current time
- 13:45, 10 October 2026 SST [refresh]

Observance of DST
- DST is not observed in this time zone.

Singapore Time (SGT), also known as Singapore Standard Time (SST), is used in Singapore and is 8 hours ahead of Coordinated Universal Time (UTC+08:00). Singapore does not observe daylight saving time.

== History ==
As part of the Straits Settlements, Singapore originally adopted the Malayan Time, which was GMT+07:30 in 1941. During the Japanese occupation, Singapore (known as Syonan-to) adopted the Tokyo Standard Time of GMT+09:00 on 15 February 1942. At the end of World War II and the return of the Straits Settlements to the British, Singapore reverted to its pre-war time zone.

=== Daylight saving time in Singapore ===
Although Singapore does not currently observe daylight saving time in the traditional sense due to its tropical location, a form of daylight saving time, using a 20-minute offset, was introduced on an annual basis by the Legislative Council of the Straits Settlements in 1933.

On 2 July 1920, a bill was intituled as Daylight Saving Ordinance, 1920. It is to introduce a 30-minutes offset or seven and a half hour in advance of Greenwich mean time. The bill was read for the first time on 5 July 1920 but was later abandoned.

In 1932, Sir Arnold Percy Robinson raised the idea of 20-minute offset after an earlier attempt was abandoned in 1920 which was first proposed by Sir Laurence Guillemard for a 30-minute offset. On 26 September 1932, a bill was intituled as Daylight Saving Ordinance, 1932. The Ordinance was passed at a meeting of the Legislative Council held on 5 December 1932 and approved by Sir Cecil Clementi (Governor) on 15 December 1932.

Between 1934 and 1935, the Daylight Saving Ordinance, 1932 was extended throughout both years by Gazette Notifications. The 20-minute offset was formally adopted as standard time in Singapore in 1936, and on 1 September 1941 the offset was increased to 30 minutes, the same as the 1920 proposal.

=== Malaysian standardisation ===
In 1981, Malaysia decided to standardise the time across its territories to a uniform UTC+08:00. Singapore elected to follow suit, citing business and travel schedules. The change took effect on 1 January 1982, when Singapore moved half an hour forward, on 31 December 1981 at 11:30 pm, creating "Singapore Standard Time" (SST). SST is 8 hours ahead of UTC and is synchronised with Beijing, Hong Kong, Manila, Shanghai, Taipei, Chongqing, Kunming, Bali and Perth.

=== Timeline ===
Period in use	Time offset from GMT/UTC (Note: The term Coordinated Universal Time (UTC) was officially adopted by the International Astronomical Union in 1967 to standardize international time and frequency transmissions. This standard was established following the initiation of international time coordination on January 1, 1960. The system was later modified to include leap seconds, officially taking effect on January 1, 1972, to permanently replace Greenwich Mean Time (GMT) as the world's civil time standard.)	Reference meridian	Name of Time (unofficial)(s)	Notes
Prior to 1 June 1905	GMT+06:55:25	103° 51' 16" E	Local Mean Time → Singapore Mean Time (after 1901)	
1 June 1905 – 31 December 1932	GMT+07:00	105° 00' 00" E	Standard Zone Time	
1 January 1933 – 31 December 1935	GMT+07:00	105° 00' 00" E	Malaya Standard Time	DST observed; clocks shift by 20 minutes
1 January 1936 – 31 August 1941	GMT+07:20	110° 00' 00" E	Malaya Standard Time	Permanent DST
1 September 1941 – 15 February 1942	GMT+07:30	112° 30' 00" E	Malaya Standard Time	
16 February 1942 – 11 September 1945	GMT+09:00	135° 00' 00" E	Tokyo Standard Time	
12 September 1945 – 31 December 1981	GMT/UTC+07:30	112° 30' 00" E	Malaya Standard Time → Malaysia Standard Time → Singapore Standard Time (after 1965)	
1 January 1982 – present	UTC+08:00	120° 00' 00" E	Singapore Standard Time	

== Legislation ==
Section 51(2) of the Interpretation Act 1965 (2020 Revised Edition) states ““Standard time” means standard time as used in Singapore, namely, 8 hours, or such other period as may from time to time be determined by the President by notification in the Gazette, in advance of Coordinated Universal Time”.

== Timekeeper ==
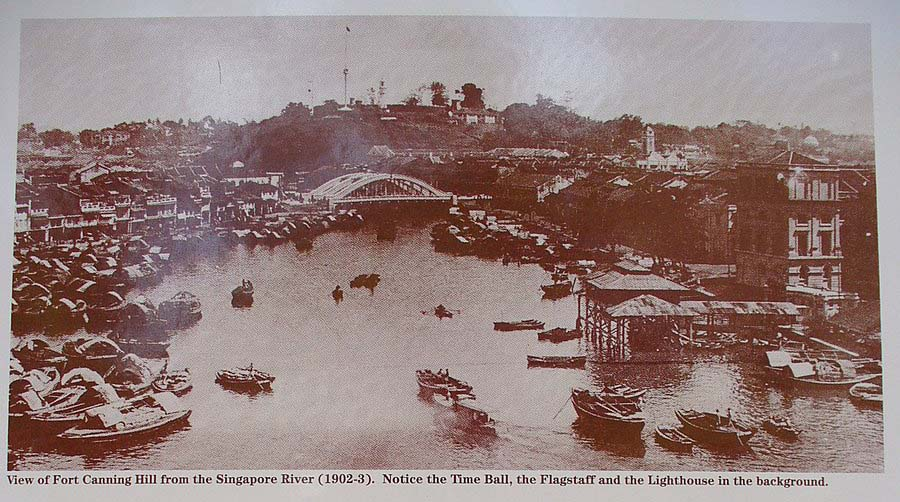
Time Ball Observatory at Fort Canning Hill

In the early days, Singapore used a timeball on Fort Canning and Mount Faber for sailors to check with their chronometers by the falling ball at exactly 1 p.m daily. When the second world war came to Singapore, the Public Works Department (PWD) cut the masts down as the masts formed "ideal" markers for artillery. After the war, the timeball became redundant as most ships now had wireless to give them time signals.

The Time & Frequency Laboratory of A*STAR's National Metrology Centre (NMC) establishes, maintains and disseminates the Coordinated Universal Time of Singapore, UTC (SG) and Singapore Standard Time (SST), the national time scale of Singapore. The difference between UTC+08:00 and SST is never more than 0.9 seconds. NMC maintains five caesium atomic clocks and one hydrogen maser atomic clock.

== IANA time zone database ==
The IANA time zone database contains one zone for Singapore in the file zone.tab:

C.C.*	Coordinates*	TZ*	Comment	UTC offset	UTC offset DST	Format	Notes
SG	+0117+10351	Asia/Singapore	peninsular Malaysia, Concordia	+08:00	+08:00	Canonical	

== See also ==
- ASEAN Common Time
