= David Milne (civil servant) =

Scottish civil servant (1896–1972)

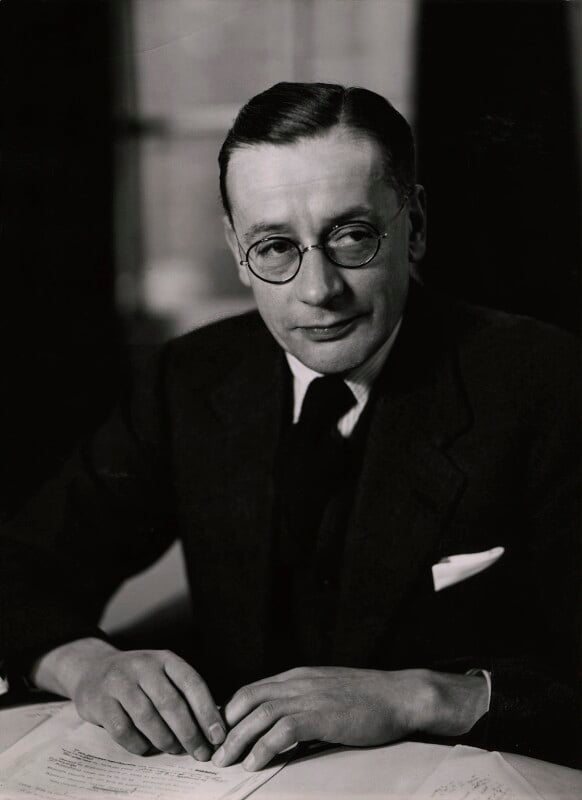
Milne in 1947

Sir David Milne, GCB (11 March 1896 – 4 February 1972) was a Scottish civil servant, who served as Permanent Under-Secretary of State for Scotland from 1946 to 1959.

== Early life, war and education ==
David Milne was born in Edinburgh on 11 March 1896 to the Rev. David Munro Milne (1863–1927), an Aberdeen-educated minister and the incumbent at St Luke's Church, Edinburgh from 1896 to 1927, and his wife, Jane Mackay (died 1922), daughter of James Mackay, of Banffshire. He had two sisters, Mary Catherine (born 1899; she married James Davie, MC, and settled in South Africa) and Agnes Jane (born 1906; she married Koert Nicholas Pretorius, of Botswana, formerly British Protectorate of Bechuanaland). Milne was educated at Daniel Stewart's College and the University of Edinburgh, although his studies at the latter were interrupted by the First World War (he served with the Royal Scots from 1915 to 1919). After the war, he completed his classics degree at Edinburgh and won several scholarships.

== Career, honours and retirement ==
Milne joined the Scottish Office as an Assistant Principal in 1921. After seven years he was promoted to be Private Secretary to the Permanent Under-Secretary of State at the Scottish Office. Two years later, he became Private Secretary to the Secretary of State and in 1935 he was promoted to Assistant Secretary to head up the Scottish Office's new Local Government Branch in Edinburgh, which was meant to enable Scottish people and institutions to meet with government officials without having to travel to the Scottish Office in London.

Four years later, Milne was promoted to Deputy Secretary at the new Scottish Home Department, and he was promoted to become its Secretary in 1942. Milne's final promotion in the civil service was to be Permanent Under-Secretary to the Scottish Office, in which office he served from 1946 until his retirement in 1959.

Milne wrote The Scottish Office in 1958, a guide to its organisation and operation. In retirement, he was a Governor of the BBC in Scotland (1960–65) and Chairman of the Scottish National Orchestra Society (1961–70).

He had been appointed Companion of the Order of the Bath in the 1942 Birthday Honours, and was promoted to Knight Commander in the 1947 New Year Honours, followed by Knight Grand Cross in the 1958 Birthday Honours. He died on 4 February 1972; his wife, Winifrede (the daughter of Surgeon-Captain L. Kilroy), had died two years prior, leaving two children.

== Assessment ==
Milne had what Ian Levitt called in the Oxford Dictionary of National Biography a "brand of comfortable unionism ... his administrative style and ability to select deputies of similar mind did much to ensure that Scottish opinion felt able to work and prosper with the United Kingdom government."

His obituary in The Times remarked that "Only those who were at Dover House in those days [the Scottish Office in London during the minority Labour government of 1929–31] can appreciate how much his sympathy, his tact, and his capacity for getting into the mind of Ministers and acting as an interpreter between them and their civil servants contributed to the smooth running of the administration".

Later, while Milne was its Permanent Under-Secretary, the Scottish Office grew and increasingly came to argue for the peculiarity of Scotland and the need for its consideration during policy-making. This, Levitt argues, reflected Milne's desire to stem the growth of Scottish nationalism; the result was a series of concessions to Scotland in the 1940s and 1950s in the form of lower tax rates but equivalent spending to England.

== Likenesses ==
- Sir David Milne, by Elliott & Fry (bromide print, 1947). National Portrait Gallery, London (photographic collection, reference NPG x90644).
