= A.E. Weatherhead =

Arthur Evelyn Weatherhead, CMG (1880-1956) was a British colonial administrator in South Africa, Uganda and the Seychelles.

Weatherhead was the first district commissioner of West Nile District. In 1914, the Southern portion of the Lado Enclave was assigned from Belgium to Uganda under the British Protectorate. Weatherhead took over the administration of the "New Area" and built a station in Arua, the present headquarters. He drew the first plan of Arua Town. Locally, Weatherhead was nicknamed Njerekede/ Ejerikedi (a brave honest man they could trust and who trusted them). The Weatherhead Park Lane in Arua is named after him; it starts from the Main Roundabout adjacent to the golf course and extends east towards the Presidential Suite in Anyafio village.

He waged continual war against Lugbara groups in an attempt to impose British colonial rule. He referred to the Lugbara as "wild and unattractable, and as "shy and unorganized", requiring "severe measures before submitting to administration". Following the British policy of indirect rule, he used the chiefs appointed by the Belgians for administration and control.

He was appointed a Companion of the Order of St Michael and St George (CMG) in the 1934 Birthday Honours.
