= William Murrie =

Scottish civil servant (1903-1994)

Sir William Stuart Murrie GCB KBE (1903–1994) was a 20th-century senior Scottish civil servant heading the Scottish Office.

== Life ==
Murrie was born at 125 Perth Road, a humble flat over shops in Dundee on 19 December 1903 the son of Catherine Stuart Burgh and Thomas Murrie, a commercial traveller from Broughty Ferry. He was educated at Harris Academy in west Dundee.

He studied Classics first at the University of Edinburgh then at Balliol College, Oxford. He joined the Scottish Office as a civil servant in 1926 and was soon appointed Private Secretary to Sir Godfrey Collins. In 1935 he transferred to the Department of Health as Permanent Secretary (assisted by Norman Graham), where he prepared the plans for the evacuation of Scottish children in the run up to the Second World War.

In 1944 he transferred from Edinburgh to London first as Under Secretary then as Deputy Secretary to the Cabinet Office. From 1948 to 1952 he served as Deputy to William Elias Newsam.

In 1952 he returned to Scotland as Secretary of the Scottish Education Department with colleagues including William Arbuckle and James Brunton. After a short spell as Secretary to the Scottish Home Department he became Permanent Under Secretary of State to the Scottish Office in 1959. He retired in 1964 shortly after his 60th birthday.

On 2 July 1968 he was awarded an honorary doctorate (LLD) by the University of Dundee.

He died in a nursing home in Edinburgh on 6 June 1994 aged 90.

== Family ==
In 1932 he married Eleanore Boswell (d.1966)
