= Horace Hamilton =

British civil servant

Horace Perkins Hamilton
- Born: 20 November 1880; Ashford, Kent
- Died: 15 September 1971 (aged 90)
- Occupation: Civil Servant

Sir Horace Perkins Hamilton, GCB (20 November 1880 – 15 September 1971) was a British civil servant, who served successively as Chairman of the Board of Customs and Excise from 1919 to 1927, Permanent Under-Secretary of State to the Board of Trade from 1927 to 1937, and then Permanent Under-Secretary of State for Scotland from 1937 to 1946. He was the United Kingdom's representative on the Commonwealth Economic Committee from then until 1961 and he served as the committee's from 1947 to 1949. He was appointed a Knight Grand Cross of the Order of the Bath in the 1942 Birthday Honours, having been knighted at the lower grade of that order 21 years previously.

Government offices
Preceded by Sir Laurence Guillemard	Chairman of the Board of Customs and Excise; 1919–1927	Succeeded by Sir Francis Floud
