= Eleanore Boswell =

American English professor (1897–1966)

Eleanore Boswell Murrie
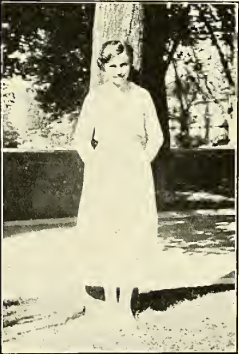
- From Bryn Mawr College Yearbook Class of 1921
- Born: Eleanore Boswell; 4 August 1897; Philadelphia, Pennsylvania, U.S.
- Died: 4 August 1966 (aged 69); Edinburgh, Scotland, UK
- Education: Bryn Mawr College
- Spouse: William Stuart Murrie
- Writing career
- Subject: English literature
- Notable works: The Restoration Court Stage, 1660–1702
- Notable awards: Rose Mary Crawshay Prize (1933)

Eleanore Boswell (also known as Eleanor Boswell; Eleanore Boswell Murrie; 4 August 1897, Philadelphia – 4 August 1966, Edinburgh) was an American scholar of English literature specialising in the Elizabethan, Commonwealth and Restoration periods. She was a Guggenheim Fellow in the Humanities (1930) and a winner of the Rose Mary Crawshay Prize (1933).

== Life ==
Eleanore Boswell was born in Philadelphia, Pennsylvania. She attended the Germantown High School and the Philadelphia High School for Girls, and joined Bryn Mawr College in 1917 to study English and Greek. She graduated magna cum laude in 1921. The same year, she received a European Fellowship to study for a year at Bedford College, London. She returned to Bryn Mawr for her master's degree, which was awarded in 1923.

Boswell taught English at Rosemary Hall from 1923 and 1925. She was an executive secretary of the American Association of University Women from 1925 to 1927. In 1930, she received a Guggenheim Fellowship, and finished her doctoral degree at the University of London.

In 1932, Boswell married William Stuart Murrie, a Scottish civil servant. They lived in London for several years before moving to Edinburgh. They were keen supporters of the Edinburgh International Festival and were responsible for the inclusion of late medieval Scottish drama in the festival.

Boswell's book The Restoration Court and Stage, published in 1932, won the Rose Mary Crawshay Prize in 1933.

Boswell taught English part-time at the University of Edinburgh, where she also began to work towards a D.Litt.

Eleanore Boswell died on 4 August 1966 at Edinburgh.

== Selected works ==
- Boswell, Eleanore (1932). The Restoration Court Stage, 1660–1702. Harvard University.
- Day, Cyrus Lawrence; Boswell Murrie, Eleanore (1940). English song-books, 1651-1702: a bibliography with a first-line index of songs. Oxford University.

== Bibliography ==
- "Class Notes". Bryn Mawr Alumnae Bulletin. XIV (2). 1934.
- "Class Notes". Bryn Mawr Alumnae Bulletin. XVIII (5). 1938.
- "Eleanor Boswell is made European Fellow for 1921". The College News. VII (20). Bryn Mawr College. 23 March 1921.
- "Graduating with Honors". Bryn Mawr College Yearbook: Class of 1921. 1921.
- Dalyell, Tam (9 June 1994). "Obituary: Sir William Murrie". The Independent.
- "Miss Boswell Wins Award of Honor: Former Secretary of University Women Given Fellowship for Research Work". Evening Star. Washington D.C. 8 April 1929.
- "Eleanore Boswell Murrie". John Simon Guggenheim Memorial Foundation.
- McClellan, J.F. (2009). "Murrie, Sir William Stuart". Oxford Dictionary of National Biography (online ed.). Oxford University Press. doi:10.1093/ref:odnb/55161. (Subscription, Wikipedia Library access or UK public library membership required.)
- "Obituary". The Times. 6 August 1966.
