= Arnold Percy Robinson =

British lawyer and colonial administrator (1879–1960)

Sir Arnold Percy Robinson
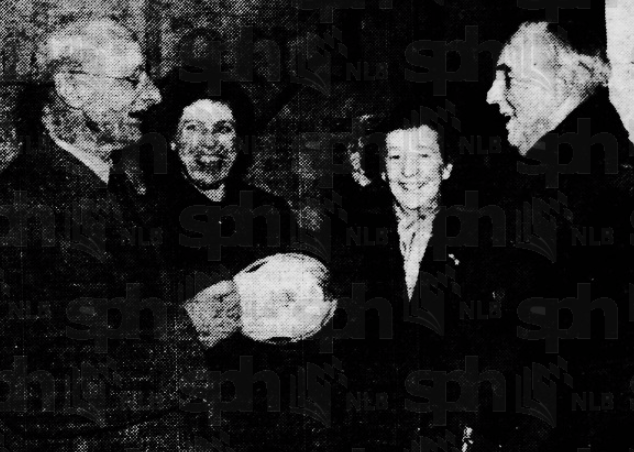
- Robinson (left) with Sir Shenton Thomas in 1951
- Born: 7 March 1879
- Died: 29 February 1960 (aged 80); Woking, Surrey
- Occupation(s): Lawyer and colonial administrator
- Children: 1

Sir Arnold Percy Robinson (7 March 1879 – 29 February 1960) was a British lawyer and colonial administrator in British Malaya.

== Early life and education ==
Robinson was born on 7 March 1879, the son of Arnold Robinson. He was educated at Berkhamsted School.

== Career ==
Robinson was admitted as a solicitor and advocate in England in 1905. In 1907, he went to Singapore, where he was admitted to the Straits Settlements Bar and Federated Malay States Bar in 1908, and joined the law firm Drew & Napier. Shortly after he joined the firm's branch office in Kuala Lumpur where he also performed valuable public service including as a member of the Federated Malay States Bar Committee and the Sanitary Board. He returned to the Singapore branch, built up a successful practice at the bar, and eventually rose to senior partner.

Robinson was a prominent member of the local community who served on various public bodies and committees being knighted for his public services in 1934. For eight years he was a senior unofficial member of the Executive and Legislative Councils of the Straits Settlements (1927–1935). In 1932, his proposal for a new form of daylight saving using a 20-minute offset was enacted as the Daylight Saving Ordinance, and he played a prominent role in the introduction of the Girls' Protection Ordinance and the Money Lenders' Ordinance. He was also a member of the Anti-Profiteering Commission and the Social Hygiene Board. He was a member of the Executive Committee of Raffles College. He was President of the Royal Singapore Golf Club for four years. For many years was a member of the Straits Settlements Bar Committee. He was President of the Straits Settlements Association. He represented the Straits Settlements at the Coronation of King George VI. In 1935 he retired, and in 1937 he served as President of the Association of British Malaya in London.

== Personal life and death ==
Robinson married Eversley Chaning-Pearce in 1910 and they had a daughter. After she died in 1949 he married that year, Violet Eileen (née Ward), widow of George Kay. He was a keen yachtsman.

Robinson died on 29 February 1960 in Woking, Surrey, aged 80.

== Honours ==
Riobinson was created a Knight Bachelor in the 1934 Birthday Honours.
