= Matthew Campbell (civil servant) =

British civil servant

Sir Matthew Campbell KBE CB FRSE (23 May 1907 – 7 March 1998) was a senior British civil servant and Secretary of the Department of Agriculture and Fisheries for Scotland. He was highly instrumental in the establishment of the Crofters Commission.

== Early life ==
Matthew Campbell was born on 23 May 1907, son of nurseryman Matthew Campbell of High Blantyre, Lanarkshire, Scotland. Matthew, junior, attended the Hamilton Academy, "a famous scholarly school" in nearby Hamilton. From the Academy, Campbell matriculated at the University of Glasgow, graduating MA.

== Career ==
Entering the civil service in 1928, Campbell was to hold posts in the Inland Revenue and the Admiralty (1935), before being appointed Principal, Department of Agriculture for Scotland (1938–43), Assistant Secretary (1943–53), Under-Secretary (1953–58), and latterly, the last Secretary of the Department of Agriculture for Scotland (1958–62), becoming in 1962 the first Secretary of the new Department of Agriculture and Fisheries for Scotland, a position he held until his retirement in 1968.

From 1951 to 1954 Campbell served as Secretary of the Taylor Committee, on which recommendation the Crofters' Commission for Scotland was established and Campbell was to be highly instrumental in taking forward the recommendations and work of the Crofters' Commission.

== Marriage, awards and honours ==
Married in 1939 (Isabella Wilson), Campbell was invested Companion of the Bath in the 1959 New Year Honours and elected Fellow of the Royal Society of Edinburgh on 6 March 1961, one of his Proposers being Sir Thomas Murray Taylor KC, Principal and Vice-Chancellor of the University of Aberdeen and former Chair of the Taylor Committee, to which Campbell had been secretary.

Matthew Campbell was knighted (KBE) in the 1963 Birthday Honours.

He died at Christleton, in Cheshire on 7 March 1998.
