= Public assistance committee =

A public assistance committee (PAC), in the UK, was a body locally created after the abolition of the boards of guardians in 1930 by the Local Government Act 1929, when their powers and responsibilities for poor relief were passed to county and county borough councils, and workhouses were also abolished. PACs were replaced by Social Welfare Committees from 1940; they were themselves wound up from 1948.
