= Board of Agriculture for Scotland =

The Board of Agriculture for Scotland was a Scottish public body that existed between 1911 and 1928 when its functions were transferred to the Department of Agriculture for Scotland.

== Establishment ==
The board was established by the Small Landholders (Scotland) Act 1911 (1 & 2 Geo. 5. c. 49).

The 1911 act provided for the board to consist of not more than three persons, nominated by the Secretary for Scotland and appointed by His Majesty.

The board was dissolved by the Reorganisation of Offices (Scotland) Act 1928 and its functions were transferred to a new Department of Agriculture for Scotland.

== Functions ==
The board had the "general duty of promoting the interests of agriculture, forestry, and other rural industries in Scotland", to promote, aid, and develop instruction in agriculture, forestry, and other rural industries, and to take such steps as they think proper for the promotion and development of agricultural organisation and co-operation. together with powers and duties conferred on them or transferred to them under the 1911 act. The act provided a power for further functions of the Board of Agriculture and Fisheries to be transferred to the Board of Agriculture for Scotland by Order in Council. The board was also empowered to undertake the collection and preparation of statistics relating to agriculture, forestry, and other rural industries, and may make or aid in making such inquiries, experiments, and research, and collect or aid in collecting such information relating thereto as they think advisable. The functions of the Congested Districts Board were transferred to the board, together with the Congested Districts (Scotland) Fund which was transferred into the new Agriculture (Scotland) Fund.

The Land Settlement (Scotland) Act 1919 empowered the board, with the consent of the Secretary for Scotland and Treasury, to compulsorily acquire land for the purposes of the Small Holding Colonies Acts 1916 and 1918.

== Membership ==
Membership of the board included-

- John Donald Sutherland 1912-1922 Also Commissioner for Small Landholdings
- James Wood OBE 1922 -
- James Mather FSI 1922
