= Scottish Office =

Department of the United Kingdom Government from 1885 until 1999

- Royal Arms of HM Government in Scotland

Department overview
- Formed: 1885
- Dissolved: 1999
- Superseding agencies: Scotland Office (reserved or excepted functions); Scottish Executive (devolved functions)
- Jurisdiction: Scotland
- Headquarters: St Andrew's House
- Ministers responsible: The 23rd and 6th Earl of Mar, Secretary of State for Scotland (1707-1709; first); Donald Dewar, Secretary of State for Scotland (1997-1999)
- Child Department: Various, see Departments

The Scottish Office was a department of the Government of the United Kingdom from 1885 until 1999, exercising a wide range of government functions in relation to Scotland under the control of the Secretary of State for Scotland. Following the establishment of the Scottish Parliament in 1999, most of its work was transferred to the newly established Scottish Executive (now the Scottish Government), with a small residue of functions retained by the Scotland Office.

Scottish Office buildings in London & Edinburgh

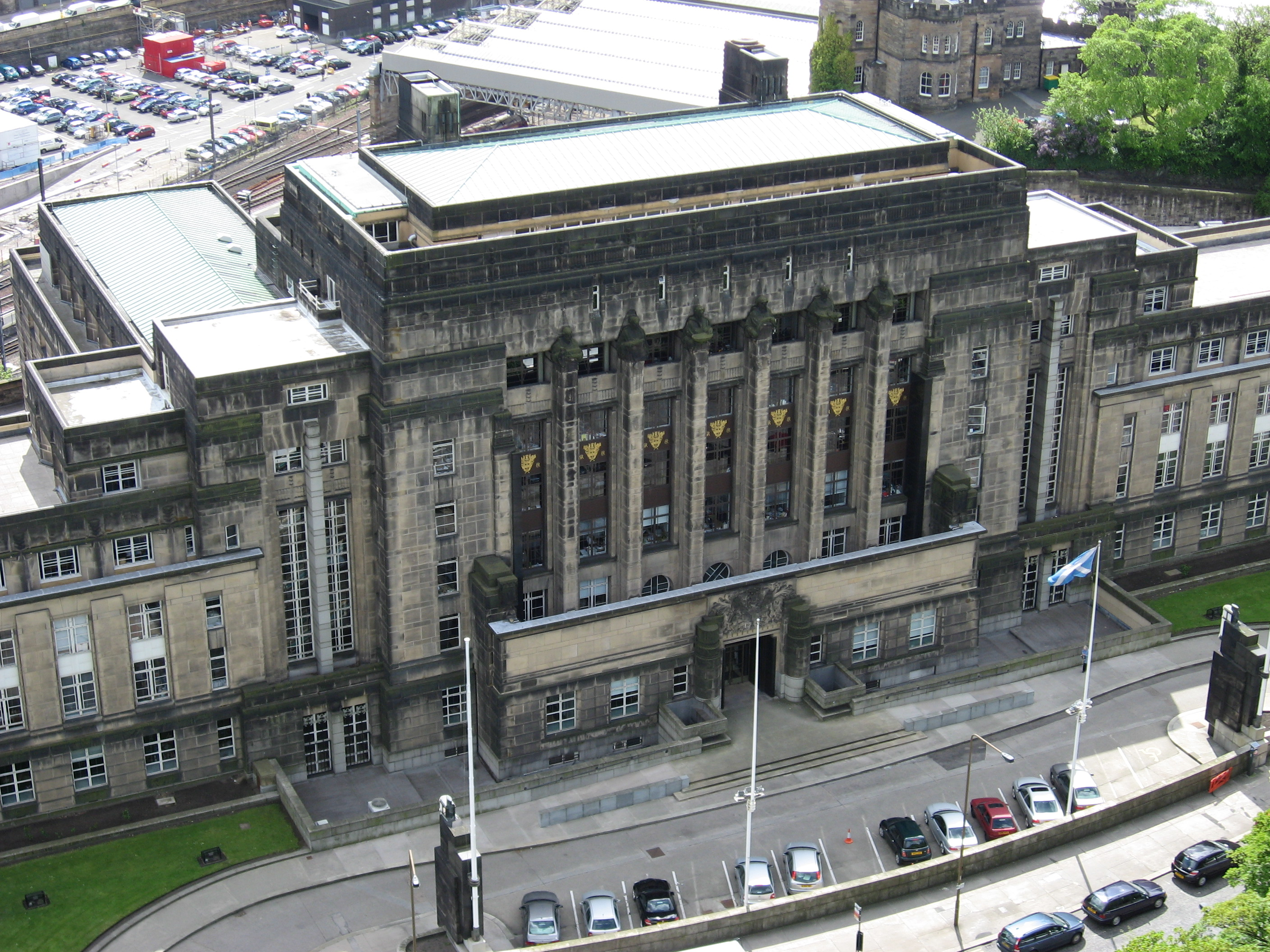
St Andrew's House, Calton Hill, Edinburgh

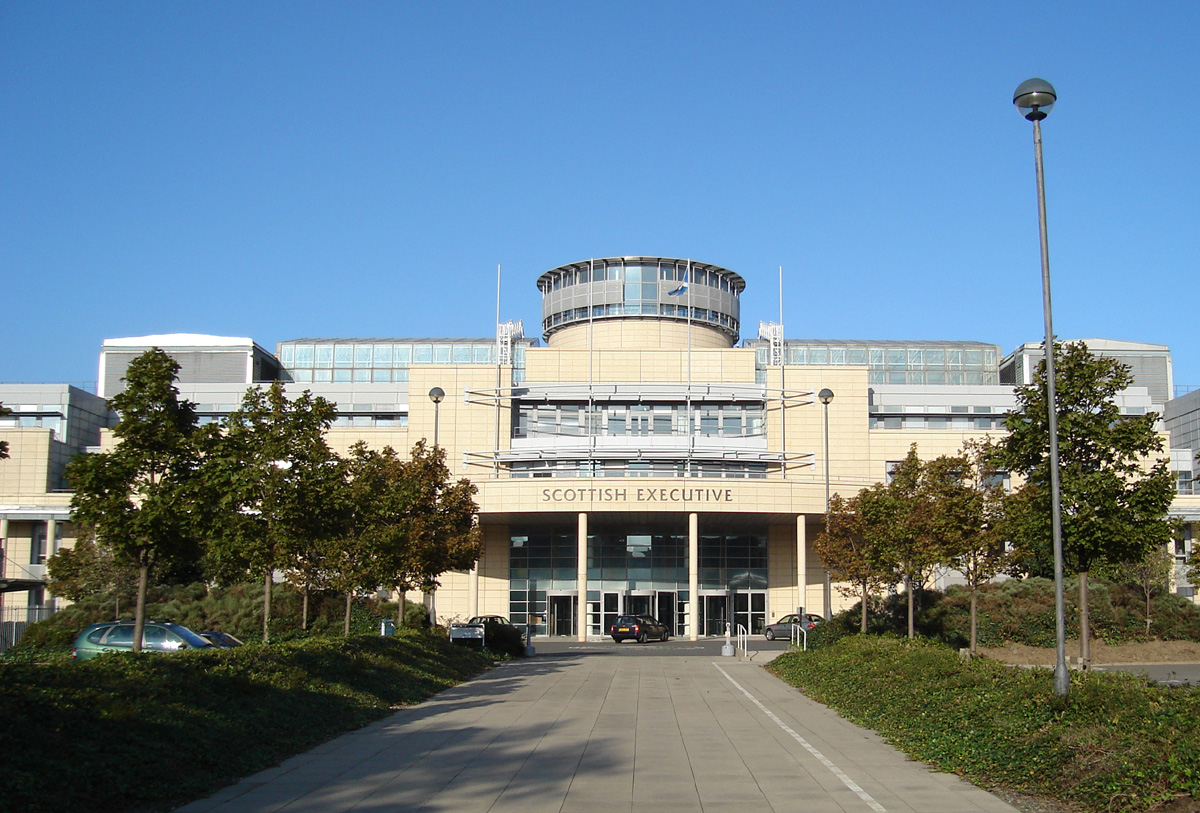
Victoria Quay, Scotland, Leith, Edinburgh

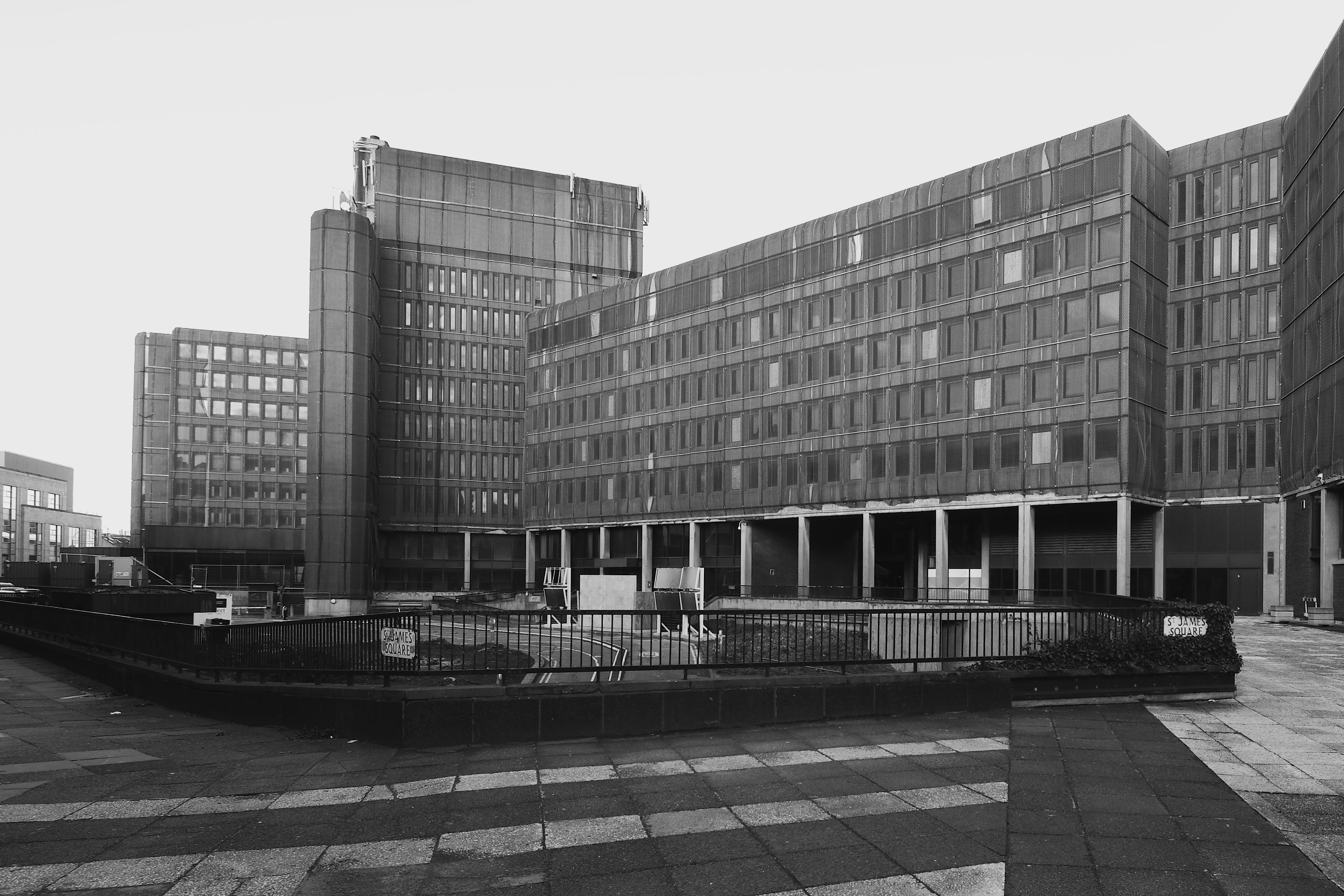
New St. Andrew's House, New Town, Edinburgh

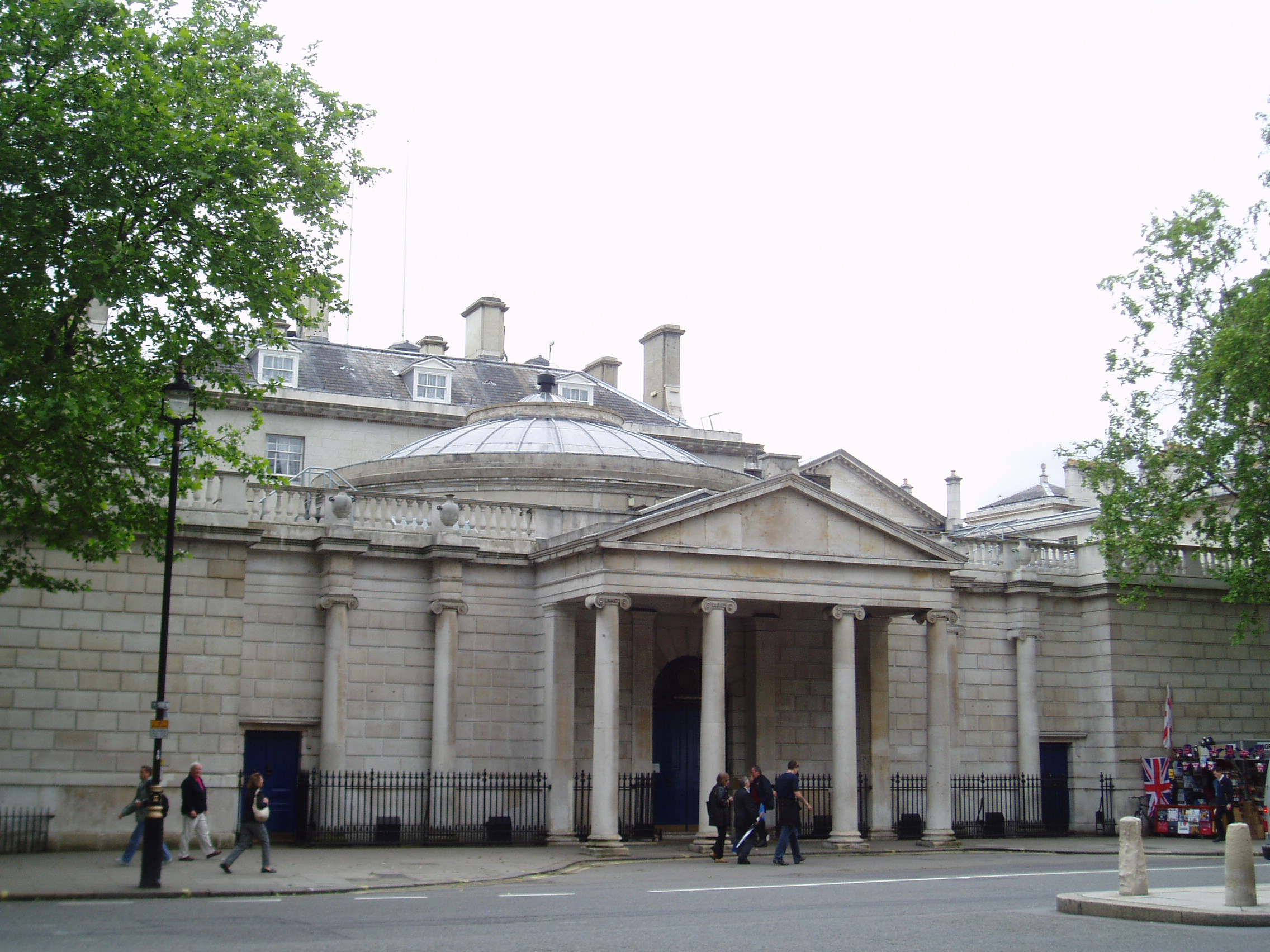
Dover House, Whitehall, London

== History ==
Following the Act of Union 1707 and the adjournment of the old Parliament of Scotland, the post of Secretary of State for Scotland was established within the government of the Kingdom of Great Britain. The Secretary of State was entrusted with general responsibility for the governance of Scotland, with the Lord Advocate acting as chief law officer in Scotland. The post of Secretary of State for Scotland was abolished in 1746, and the Lord Advocate assumed responsibility for government business in Scotland. In 1828 the Home Secretary was formally put "in charge of Scotland", but the Lord Advocate continued to be the voice of Scotland in the government and took the lead in Scottish debates.

During the nineteenth century, the functions of government increased, particularly at a local level dealing with issues such as public health, poor law relief, roads and education, and local authorities were active in providing water supplies, drainage, hospitals and town planning. To exercise control over these local activities, a number of supervisory boards such as the Board of Supervision for Poor Relief (1845–1894), the General Board of Commissioners in Lunacy (1857–1913) and the Scotch Education Department (a committee of the Privy Council) were established. However the accountability of these boards was not clear, they were staffed by amateurs and they increased the scope for government patronage. In 1869 Scottish MPs asked Gladstone to appoint a Scottish Secretary with responsibility for the boards, but the post of Secretary for Scotland, and with it, the Scottish Office, were not created until 1885.

=== Departments ===
By the time the Scottish Office was formed in 1885, a number of institutions of government existed exclusively for Scotland: the Board of Supervision for Poor Relief which had been established in 1828, the Fishery Board which had been limited to Scotland in 1849, the General Board of Commissioners in Lunacy (established in 1857), the Scotch Education Department (established in 1872), and the Prisons Commission, created in 1877. In 1886, a Crofters Commission was established, and lasted until 1911. In 1894, the Board of Supervision for Poor Relief became the Local Government Board for Scotland, and three years later a Congested Districts Board was established and lasted until 1911. To these were added the Board of Agriculture for Scotland in 1912, the Highlands and Islands Medical Services Board the following year, and the Scottish Insurance Commissioners in 1911.

These bodies were gradually consolidated and reformed thereafter. In 1919, a Board of Health was formed to bring together and extend the functions of the Insurance Commissioners, Highlands and Islands Medical Services Board, and the Local Government Board for Scotland. This Board, along with the Board of Agriculture and the Prisons Commission were abolished in 1928 and replaced with departments, for Health, Agriculture and Prisons respectively (by the Reorganisation of Offices (Scotland) Act 1928).

The next major phase of reorganisation occurred in 1939, following the Gilmour Committee Report on Scottish Administration; by the Reorganisation of Offices (Scotland) Act 1939, the Scottish Education Department (which is what the Scotch Education Department had been called since 1918), the Department of Health for Scotland, the Department of Agriculture for Scotland, the Prisons Department for Scotland, and the Fishery Board for Scotland had their functions transferred to the Secretary of State. The departments were reformed, with the functions of the Fishery Board and the Prisons Department merged into a new Scottish Home Department. Agriculture, Education and Health were left largely intact and reformed into Departments. The portfolios were widened when the Scottish Office received functions relating to the Crown Estates in 1943 and forestry in 1945, and after the Report of the Royal Commission on Scottish Affairs in 1954.

The departmental structure changed in 1960, when responsibility for fisheries was removed from the Home Office and added the Department of Agriculture (it then became the Department of Agriculture and Fisheries), and in 1962, when the Home and Health departments were merged (into the Scottish Home and Health Department). A new Development Department was also established in 1962. In 1973, they were joined by a new Scottish Economic Planning Department, which was renamed the Scottish Industry Department in 1983. All of the Departments had their names changed in 1991, when "Scottish Office" was prefixed to them, and at the same time the Development Department was renamed to the Scottish Office Environment Department.

The year 1995 brought further changes; the Industry Department was merged with Education to form the Scottish Office Education and Industry Department; the Environment Department reverted to its old name; the Department of Agriculture and Fisheries was renamed the Scottish Office Agriculture, Environment and Fisheries Department; and the Home and Health Department was broken up: the new Scottish Office Home Department was still headed by a permanent secretary, but Scottish Office Health Department was not, instead comprising the Management Executive for NHS in Scotland, the Chief Scientist Office, the Public Health Policy Unit, Medical Services, and Nursing Services.

All of the Departments were abolished in 1999 and most of their functions transferred to the newly formed Scottish Executive.

== Ministers ==
The post of Secretary for Scotland was established in 1885. From 1892 the holder sat in Cabinet and in 1926 the post was elevated to the rank of Principal Secretary of State and retitled Secretary of State for Scotland. The addition of responsibility for health functions in 1919 resulted in the creation of a junior ministerial post, the Parliamentary Under-Secretary for Health for Scotland, which in turn became a Parliamentary Under-Secretary of State for Scotland in 1926.

Additional Parliamentary Under-Secretary posts were added in 1940 and 1951 and a Minister of State post was established in 1951. In 1969-70 one of the Under-Secretary posts was replaced by an additional Minister of State. From 1974 to 1979 there were two Ministers of State and three Under-Secretaries, reverting to one Minister of State in 1979.

== Management ==
When the political office of Secretary for Scotland was established in 1885, a permanent under-secretaryship was created, to be occupied by a civil servant. The first office-holder was Francis Sandford, who had previously been secretary to the Scotch Education Department. When the political office became the Secretary of State for Scotland in 1926, the permanent secretary also became formally styled Permanent Under-Secretary of State for Scotland. This position was equivalent to Grade 1 in the Civil Service grading structure introduced in 1971.

The several separate Scottish departments which fell under remit of the Scottish Office were each headed by a Secretary (equivalent to Grade 2 in the 1971 structure) who was responsible directly to the Secretary of State, but would meet with the Permanent Under-Secretary of State at the Scottish Office regularly.

In addition, another Grade-2 office – Deputy Secretary (Central Services) – ranked equally with the Secretaries of each of the Departments, and formed part of the Scottish Office's management group (along with the Secretaries and Permanent Under-Secretary). The office-holder was responsible for matters of devolution, as well as the financial management of the Office and local authority finance. The office was established in response to the devolution policies of the Labour Government of 1974–79; "it became imperative to create devolution units at high level but separate from the departments". The office was abolished in 1991. Responsibility for local government finance was then transferred to the Environment Department (formerly the Development Department), while management responsibilities were vested in Gerry Wilson, secretary of the Education Department; this latter arrangement was not intended to be permanent, but reflected the "relative workload" of the different Grade 2 officials.

== Scottish government bodies ==
- Board of Agriculture for Scotland
  - abolished and recreated as Department of Agriculture for Scotland in 1928.
  - merged with Scottish Office to form Scottish Home Department in 1939.
- Fishery Board for Scotland
  - merged with Scottish Office to form Scottish Home Department in 1939.
- Scottish Board of Health
  - abolished and recreated as Department of Health for Scotland in 1928.
- Scotch Education Department, created in 1839 but only became active in 1872
  - renamed Scottish Education Department in 1918.
  - renamed Scottish Office Education Department in 1991.
  - renamed Scottish Office Education and Industry Department in 1995.
- Scottish Home Department
  - created from the Prison Department, Agriculture Department & the Fishery Board for Scotland in 1939.
- Prison Commission, created in 1877.
  - abolished and recreated as Prison Department in 1928.
  - merged with Scottish Office to form Scottish Home Department in 1939.
