= John McKinnon Crawford =

Scottish painter and teacher (1931–2005)

John McKinnon Crawford (1931–2005) was a Scottish painter and teacher.

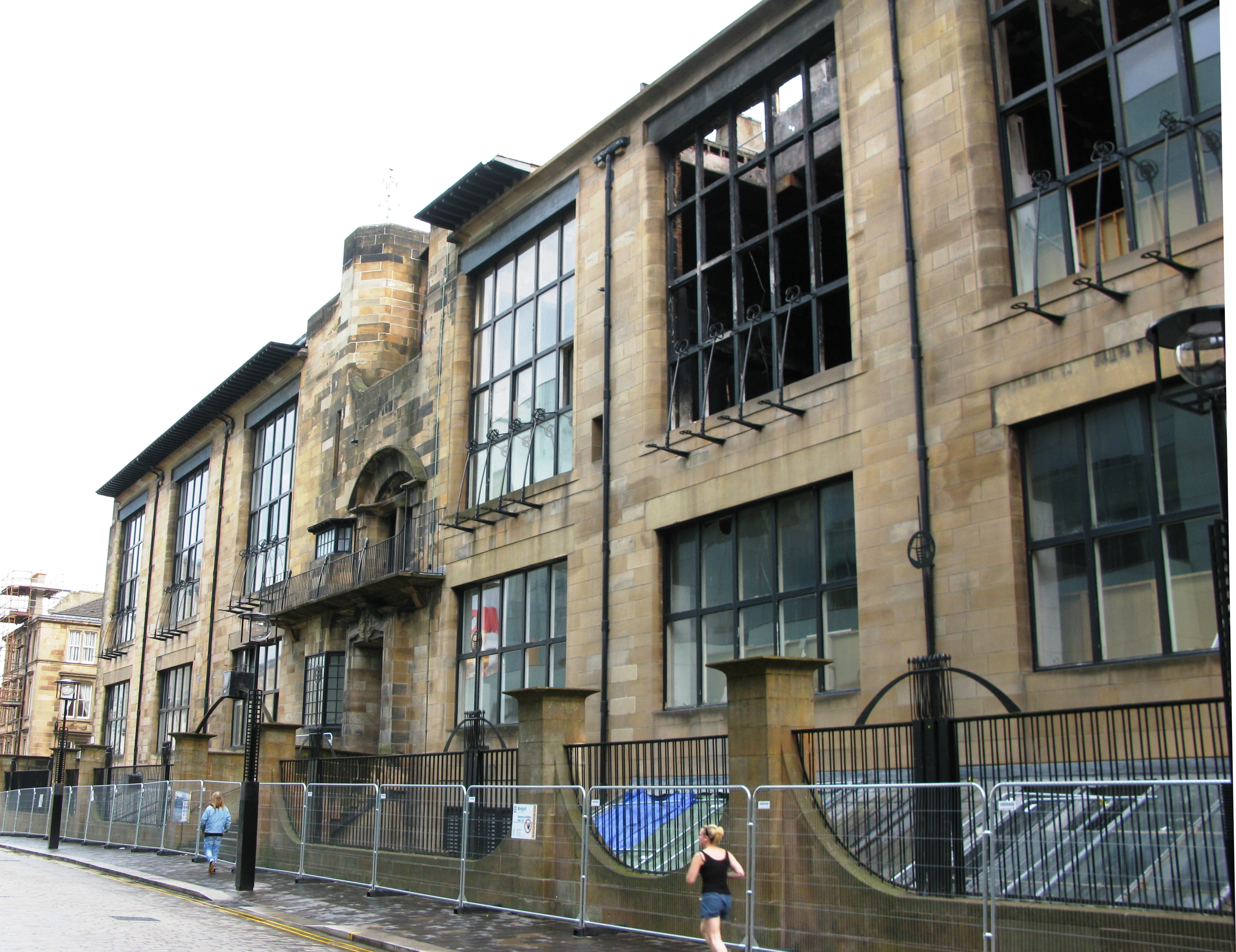
Glasgow School of Art

John McKinnon Crawford was born on 11 April 1931 at Hamilton, South Lanarkshire where his father, Alexander, was Town Officer. His mother, Mary McKinnon, was an amateur artist. A pupil of Hamilton Academy, Crawford continued his studies at Glasgow School of Art, where he was a prominent member of the Glasgow School of Art Students' Association, and one of his lecturers being Mary Armour, another former pupil of Hamilton Academy.

Following national service, and further study at St Martins, London, Crawford taught, as Principal in art and design, at Campbeltown Grammar School, thereafter being appointed in 1966, at 35, to the post of principal advisor on art and design for the Scottish Highlands, and eventually settling in the village of Strathpeffer.

A painter in the Scottish Colourists tradition, Crawford exhibited widely, including at the Royal Scottish Academy and the Royal Glasgow Institute of the Fine Arts.

John McKinnon Crawford DA died aged 73 on 20 March 2005 at Lossiemouth, survived by his wife Morag, and daughters Shuna, Cara (also an artist) and Rona.
