= Hamilton Academy =

- Hamilton, Lanarkshire; Scotland

Information
- Type: Fee-paying senior and junior day and boarding; latterly a Scottish senior selective day school, pupil intake from across the County of Lanark
- Motto: Sola Nobilitat Virtus; Latin: 'Virtue alone ennobles'
- Established: 1588; 438 years ago
- Founder: The 1st Marquess of Hamilton, head of the Ducal House of Hamilton
- Closed: ceased as an independent institution 1972
- Rector: last Rector, Alfred W. S. Dubber
- Gender: from late 19th. century – co-educational
- Age: prep school 5–12 (closed 1952) to senior school 12–18 (last intake 1971)
- Enrolment: last student roll (1971–72 session) – 1025
- Houses: Cadzow, Calder, Clutha and Kilbryde (Avon, Brandon, Clyde and Douglas in last two school sessions only)
- Colours: blue & green
- Publication: Acta – school in-house periodical & the Hamilton Academy (annual school) Magazine (up to last session, 1971–72)
- School song: "Vivat Academia!"

Hamilton Academy was a boarding and day school in Hamilton, South Lanarkshire, Scotland. It was founded in 1588 as a boys' school and was open for nearly four centuries. In the late 19th century, the school began admitting girls.

The school was described as "one of the finest schools in Scotland" in the Cambridge University Press County Biography of 1910, and was featured in a 1950 Scottish Secondary Teachers' Association magazine article series on Famous Scottish Schools.

Having joined the state sector, the school closed in 1972, as a result of the coming of comprehensive schools in Lanarkshire. It was replaced by the new Hamilton Grammar School, which took over its site and most of its pupils and staff.

== History and building ==
=== 1588–1714 ===
No longer existing as an independent institution, Hamilton Academy had a history going back to 1588 when it was endowed by The 1st Marquess of Hamilton (c. 1535-1604), an extremely powerful Scottish nobleman.

Anne, Duchess of Hamilton, by Sir Godfrey Kneller, Hamilton Collection, Lennoxlove

The school, then known as the Old Grammar School of Hamilton (not to be confused with the present Hamilton Grammar School), stood near the churchyard adjoining Hamilton Palace until, in 1714, Anne, 3rd Duchess of Hamilton, great-granddaughter of the founder, re-located the school to a new building on the newly named Grammar School Square also in the lower part of the town, and presented this to the Town Council of Hamilton. The Statistical Account of Lanarkshire of 1835 notes of this school building that it "is a venerable pile, near the centre of the town, containing a long wainscotted hall, emblazoned with the names of former scholars, cut out in the wood, as at Harrow."

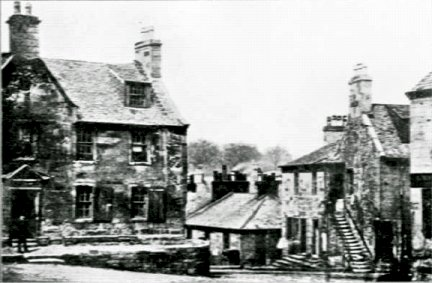
The old school building of 1714–1848

In 1847 this old school building on Grammar School Square was sold for £253 (about £23,000 now) and survived until its demolition in 1932. A plaque commemorating the site of the Old Grammar School of Hamilton (which was renamed Hamilton Academy in 1848) was commissioned by pupils of Hamilton Academy and unveiled by the academy's rector, David Anderson MC, on 21 March 1932 at a public ceremony in the presence of academy pupils and teaching staff; the provost and members of the town council, and members of Hamilton Civic Society.

=== 1848–1900 ===
The town council were sole managers of the school until, in 1848, the school (having been renamed The 'Hamilton Academy') re-located again, to larger premises on the town's Hope Street, with Rector's residence and accommodation for boarders, built by the heritors of the Parish of Hamilton, the town council and subscribers, the school then coming under the management of a Directorate chosen of these three parties. The Report on Schools in Scotland, 1868, notes that Hamilton Academy was unusual in this respect, being "a parochial, burgh and a proprietary school combined." In 1866 the Subscribers passed their interest over to the town council who, along with the heritors, managed the school until in 1872 management was transferred to the newly elected School Board of the Burgh of Hamilton under the terms of the Education (Scotland) Act 1872, under the terms of which Act the school was also confirmed (1876) as being a 'higher-class school.'

By 1900 the school had not only outgrown the Hope Street building, but the building was also subsiding. Robert Gibson MP recalled during a House of Commons debate (November 1939) that during his time at Hamilton Academy (1890s), the junior department had had to be evacuated due to rapid subsidence of that part of the Hope Street building. The school was therefore re-located to temporary accommodation in a building newly erected by the school board as 'Woodside School', until such time as the question of the academy's increasing requirements could be addressed. The school's old site on Hope Street being considered too small, a site for a new Hamilton Academy building was secured on Auchincampbell Road.

=== 1910–1972 ===
At a cost of around £40,000 (£53,000 including equipment), construction of the new building began in 1910 (completed 1913) to competition-winning designs by Cullen, Lochhead and Brown (the former's son, Alexander Cullen Jnr., also an architect, attending Hamilton Academy and the latter, William Brown, attending Hamilton Academy 1889–1894) the competition entries being assessed by George Bell, president of the Glasgow and West of Scotland Institute of Architects.

In 1911 Hamilton Academy's 'prep' (junior) school relocated to its new, separate smaller building behind the main edifice, before completion, in 1913, of the new senior school building in the French Renaissance style and of red freestone from Corncockle Quarry in Dumfriesshire. The main building, with separate entrances for girls and boys, was arranged over three storeys, with additional basements, providing accommodation for rector's office, board room, offices, classrooms, six laboratories, workshops, art rooms and gymnasia. Of particular note were the Central Hall, the large lecture hall (seating 200, gallery-style and communicating with the laboratories) and library, with reading rooms for girls and boys respectively. In addition, a domestic science block was erected in the same style to the south of the main building and near the girls' school entrance.

A feature of the wood-panelled Central Hall, rising two storeys with gallery to an arched ceiling, was the six large stained glass windows with figures representing Literature, Science, Art, Music, Technology and Gymnastics.

This new Hamilton Academy building was officially opened on 22 September 1913, a programme and souvenir of this event being published by the Hamilton Advertiser newspaper. This building remains and is a 'listed building,' category 'B.' (Note: Note that the picture shown in the Wikipedia article on Hamilton Grammar School was the former Hamilton Academy 'new' building of 1913.)

Following the First World War a handsome memorial to masters and former pupils who had fallen in that 1914–18 war was erected in the Central Hall which also housed the girl and boy school Dux medallists commemorative boards.

In 1934 plans were instigated to extend the school's junior department to accommodate up to 500 pupils, and on 3 August 1939 plans were passed that would have seen alterations to the main building to create two new luncheon rooms, further staff rooms, offices and two new libraries; and a new annex to include two new gymnasia. Due to the outbreak of the Second World War in September, these plans were not followed-through. Earlier in 1939 the local Air Raid Precautions committee had announced that it had been arranged that in the event of war and air raids, Hamilton Academy would be used as a first-aid post in case of emergency.

On 19 February 1954 a war memorial, commemorating the one schoolmaster and 68 former pupils who had fallen in the Second World War, was unveiled at the school by its former rector David Anderson, who had himself been awarded the Military Cross (with bar) for gallantry in the Great War.

Hamilton Academy continued at the 'new' Academy building from 1913 to 1972, when it closed down as an independent institution. Most pupils in the last intake (1971) to the former Hamilton Academy are still surviving, the school roll in 1971–2 session being 1025. What would have been Hamilton Academy's quadricentenary (1588–1988) was celebrated in 1988 by a reunion in Hamilton of remaining former pupils and staff.

== Intake and education ==
=== Intake ===
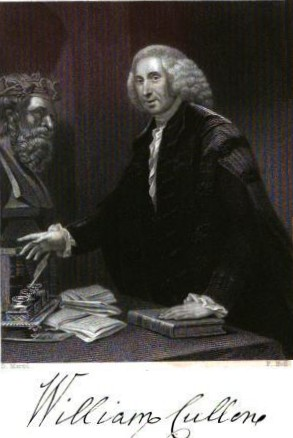
Former pupil, William Cullen, 1710–90, celebrated chemist and physician, and a founding member of the Royal Society of Edinburgh and the Royal Medical Society

Hamilton Academy was a senior and junior fee-paying day and boarding school. The Statistical Account of Scotland, 1792, states that the school "has had, for a long time past, a good reputation, and, besides the youth of the place, a great many boarders at a distance have been educated at it," and the Statistical Account of Lanarkshire, 1835, mentions that "many of (the school's scholars) are from foreign climes, and from all parts of Britain." The 1871 Census and the school's registers 1848–1900 list, among others, pupils from Glasgow, Edinburgh, Paisley, Bridge of Weir, Stewarton, England and Australia. Becoming a Scottish selective day school in the 1900s, Hamilton Academy was to form, as the 'County School', the top-most layer of a four-layer public education system, drawing its pupils from the top stream on a competitive 'Eleven Plus' examination basis from across the whole County of Lanarkshire. The selective nature of the school meant that most children in Hamilton did not attend Hamilton Academy, on the other hand, Hamilton Academy students often had quite long journeys to get to and from school each day.

Although bursaries to allay fees in attending Hamilton Academy's senior school could be won on a competitive basis and were much sought after, following the end of the Second World War fees were phased out. Thereafter the criteria for selection rested solely on academic ability, selection being made from potential pupils from across the whole County of Lanark - the old County of Lanark being, in terms of population and wealth, the most important county in Scotland and comprising a larger area, including most of the city of Glasgow, than the sum of the subsequent late twentieth century local authority areas.

Given the size of the school's catchment area, places at Hamilton Academy were at a premium. Due to its unique academic position in Scotland as the 'County School' of the country's most populous and wealthiest county and the size of its student roll, the Bulletin newspaper reported in its issue of 23 November 1959 that "... there was only one school in Scotland – Hamilton Academy – that had sufficient pupils to qualify its headmaster for such a (special) responsibility salary," and this was noted again in a House of Commons debate on teachers' salaries, 24 February 1960, when Margaret Herbison MP advised that "in the whole of Scotland only the rector of Hamilton Academy (had) qualified for the top grade of teachers' salary."

The Hamilton Academy 'prep' (junior) school continued to operate until 1952.

=== Education ===
==== Academic ====
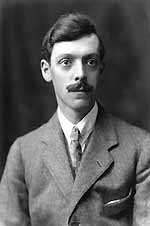
John Anderson (philosopher) awardee, from Hamilton Academy, in the University of Glasgow Bursary Competition 1911

The county-wide selective intake and the academic bias of the teaching meant that Hamilton Academy achieved excellent results in competitions. In his obituary article on former Hamilton Academy pupil Sir John Inch, Sir Tam Dalyell, former Father of the House of Commons, described Hamilton Academy as a "remarkable school" with "a formidable academic reputation" and mentions the large annual intake from Hamilton Academy to the University of Glasgow with which the academy had a particularly long and sustained relationship; a yardstick as measure of its achievements year-on-year being the number of University of Glasgow scholarships won by its students. It usually beat all other schools, by this measure at least. Between 1940 and 1950, Hamilton Academy headed the annual Glasgow University Bursary list on three occasions. Leading the Glasgow University Bursary list again in 1958, in 1959 the Glasgow Evening Times newspaper noted that "Hamilton Academy have scored a triumph by securing 16 places in the first 100. Last year (1958) they led the field with 13 places in the first 100. Next best are Hutchesons' Boys Grammar School, Glasgow, with eight places, and St. Aloysius' College, Glasgow, follow with seven."

The missionary and explorer David Livingstone who presented the awards at Hamilton Academy's annual prize-giving on his return from Africa in 1864

Topping the Glasgow University Bursary List in 1964 and again in 1965, the Evening Times wrote that Hamilton Academy's "reputation is among the highest in the country." In 1966 the same newspaper reported that "for the third year in succession Hamilton Academy has gained the highest number of places in the Glasgow University Bursary Competition. The Academy's old rivals Hutchesons' Boys' Grammar School came second," and in 1967 the Glasgow Herald noted that "Hamilton Academy – with the highest number of pupils for some years now in the first 100 places in the Glasgow University Bursary Competition – has an extremely high and far-flung academic reputation." In 1969 Hamilton Academy pupils took five of the top ten places in the Glasgow University Bursary List.

Such were the school's achievements in university entrance examinations that as late as 1988, Hamilton Academy was remembered (in a House of Lords debate) by Lord Carmichael of Kelvingrove as " (having had) one of the best records in the whole of Scotland." In session 1948–49 the Snell Exhibitioner from the University of Glasgow to Balliol College, Oxford, was a former pupil of the Academy as were, among others, Matthew Baillie, Snell Exhibitioner in 1779, and Sir Edward Hamilton Wallace, Snell Exhibitioner in 1893.

From numerous endowed funds, as an academic incentive the school awarded boy and girl Dux medals, the Blacklock Bursary (both Dux and Bursary erected in memory of James Blacklock, rector 1863–1897); subject-specific medals, and Memorial Prizes, including the Dr. James S. Dixon Bursary, endowed by former pupil James Stedman Dixon.

On his return from Africa in 1864, the celebrated missionary and explorer David Livingstone presented the awards at the school's prize-giving ceremony of that year. His speech was to inspire Hamilton Academy pupil Frederick Stanley Arnot who was later to follow on Livingstone's missionary work in central Africa.

==== Extracurricular ====
===== Sports and the Laigh Bent Playing Fields =====
The inter-house annual sports day was held at the academy's dedicated sports grounds, Laigh Bent Playing Fields, within walking distance of the main school building, in the 1950s and 60s Lady Keith, wife of former Hamilton Academy pupil, Lord Keith of Avonholm, often presenting the annual prizes. The school's inter-schools teams (rugby, soccer, tennis, hockey, cricket, athletics and golf) competed with other similarly ranked British schools in sports competitions, Hamilton Academy's senior soccer teams winning the Scottish Schools Championships (Bank of Scotland Scottish Schools Senior Shield) in 1910, 1919, 1920, 1925, 1926, 1930, 1952 and 1963 and its second senior teams winning the Scottish Schools League Championship (McGowan Cup) and the Ormiston Shield in 1963. Hamilton Academy's senior football teams also won the Division 1 League Cup in 1919, 1930, 1933 and 1935, in the Glasgow and District Secondary Schools Football League.

The Laigh Bent (meaning 'low hill') grounds of eight acres were acquired for the school in 1926. To a design by Mr. John Rennie, a master at Hamilton Academy, a sports pavilion was opened on the site on 29 October 1930. Proceedings were led by Sir Henry Shanks Keith (a past-Provost of Hamilton and Honorary Sheriff of Lanarkshire) whose son, the afore-mentioned Lord Keith of Avonholm, had attended the academy. The pavilion was officially opened by the Marquis of Douglas and Clydesdale (who became in 1940 the 14th Duke of Hamilton, and played a part in the Rudolf Hess incident of 1941). The duke served for many years as president of the Hamilton Academy FP (former pupil) Rugby Club. The pavilion (burnt down by vandals in 1976) comprised eleven changing rooms, dining room, kitchen, baths, two referees' rooms and drying and storage rooms. The grounds found to be too uneven, a scheme was devised (1936) for their levelling which began in March 1939 but due to World War II was not completed until 1947, following also the acquisition of a further six acres of adjoining fields, providing space for an additional three pitches. Costs of the scheme amounted to some £8,000 (about £200,000 now), of which £6,000 was raised by the school through a huge fund-raising campaign to which Hamilton Academy FP (former pupils) Rugby Club and Hamilton Academy FP Society greatly contributed. The new Laigh Bent Playing Fields were opened in September 1948 by the Rt. Hon. Lord Hamilton of Dalzell, K.T. C.V.O. MC, Lord Lieutenant of Lanarkshire, 2nd Baron Hamilton of Dalzell.

Hamilton Rugby Football Club (Hamilton RFC), founded in 1927 as Hamilton Academy FP (former pupil) Rugby Club, continues to play from the former Hamilton Academy's Laigh Bent playing fields.

Among former pupils who pursued careers in sports, in whole or in part, have been Craig Brown CBE (footballer and football team manager), his brother Jock Brown (football club general manager and football commentator), Madge Carruthers (former manager, Scottish women's athletic team, Commonwealth Games), Ian Lang Livingstone CBE OBE (former football club chairman), Douglas McBain (Olympic footballer) and Ian McDougall (former 'American soccer' player and inductee, soccer 'Hall of Fame', U.S.A.) (Refer to their entries on List of former pupils of Hamilton Academy.)

===== Clubs and societies =====
Aligned to the curriculum or extracurricular, many clubs and associations operated in or from or in conjunction with the school, including cadets, scouts, guides, cubs and brownies; the Hamilton Academy Air Training Corps, the Hamilton Academy FP (former pupil) Society, the dramatics, photographic, scientific, music, film and literature clubs and societies. The standard of the school's debating society was high, and long after the academy had ceased to exist this was alluded to in a House of Commons retort in 1997 to the Leader of the Opposition's (Tony Blair) rhetoric, when Peter Atkinson MP replied that if Mr. Blair "had been speaking at a debating society competition between Fettes (Mr. Blair's old school) and Hamilton Academy, I would have given him some points, but this is the House of Commons." The activities of the French, modelling, chess, golf, badminton, swimming, riding, tennis, hockey and stamp clubs were also listed in the in-school periodical, 'Acta'.

===== Music =====
In music, there were the Hamilton Academy Orchestra and various school choirs. From 1932 (apart from the years 1940–42) Hamilton Academy's mixed Choir presented an opera each year. In June 1946 over 80 members of Hamilton Academy's choir opened a week's performances of Gilbert and Sullivan's The Pirates of Penzance to a packed audience on the choir's first appearance on the stage of the Theatre Royal, Glasgow. From 30 June to 5 July 1947 the Hamilton Academy Choir performed in the Wilson Barrett Repertory Company's production of Uncle Tom's Cabin at the Alhambra Theatre, Glasgow. Returning to the Theatre Royal, Glasgow, in May 1950 the choir presented German's Merrie England. In 1967 the Glasgow Herald noted that Hamilton Academy's annual operatic performances were "strengthened by musicians from the BBC Scottish Orchestra."

The musical director of the first operas was Mr G Forbes Forsyth, succeeded by Mr John Howie who was followed by Mr Peter Mooney on his appointment as the academy's (last) head of music. Peter Mooney was to be musical director up to the school's last production in 1972.

Appearing at the jubilee festival concert of the Glasgow Music Festival Association in the St. Andrew's Halls, Glasgow, in April 1961, the Glasgow Herald's critic noted that "the well controlled singing of Hamilton Academy choir showed what excellent results can be obtained in a school where music is allowed to flourish." In December of that year the school's mixed choir joined with the famous Glasgow Phoenix Choir for a choral concert at Hamilton Town Hall (joining again with the Glasgow Phoenix Choir in a concert in 1967) and in 1962 the school's mixed choir achieved the highest mark in the Glasgow Music Festival, in addition to the festival's highest award, the Ailie Cullen Memorial Trophy, being won by Ian McGregor, a former pupil of Hamilton Academy. Also in 1962, the Hamilton Academy former pupils choir was joined, in its performances of Bizet's Carmen at Hamilton Town Hall, by guest tenor, Duncan Robertson, of the Glyndebourne Opera Company. In 1963 the school's junior, mixed voice, ensemble and senior girls choirs all took first places in their categories and shared the highest marks in the Glasgow Music Festival of that year.

The Hamilton Academy (mixed) Choir made recordings, appeared on British radio and television programmes and performed internationally. The February 1963 issue of the 'Gramophone' magazine featured a review of the record album, 'Songs of Praise', recorded by the Hamilton Academy Youth Choir, conducted by Peter Mooney, noting the academy's "long musical tradition" and that it was "very fitting that (the choir) should record a group of Songs of Praise for it earned nationwide praise for the singing of such songs recently in the BBC series of programmes of this name (Songs of Praise.)" Almost fifty years later, excerpts from this Hamilton Academy Youth Choir recording continue to be broadcast.

In June 1967 the planning began for 52 pupils from Hamilton Academy's choirs, together with Mr. Peter Mooney, to go on a three-week tour of North America, reciprocating the 1966 European tour of the Bel Canto choir of Franklin High School, Seattle, United States, when on the Scottish leg of their tour, the members of the Seattle school's choir had stayed with members of the Hamilton Academy choir. Plans were made for Hamilton Academy's choir to perform at Seattle, Portland, Vancouver, Washington D.C., Williamsburg, Arlington and New York. The three-week tour of the United States in 1968 by Hamilton Academy's (mixed) Choir, under the direction of Peter Mooney, began with concerts at the Brooklyn Academy of Music and the Cathedral of Saint John the Divine, New York.

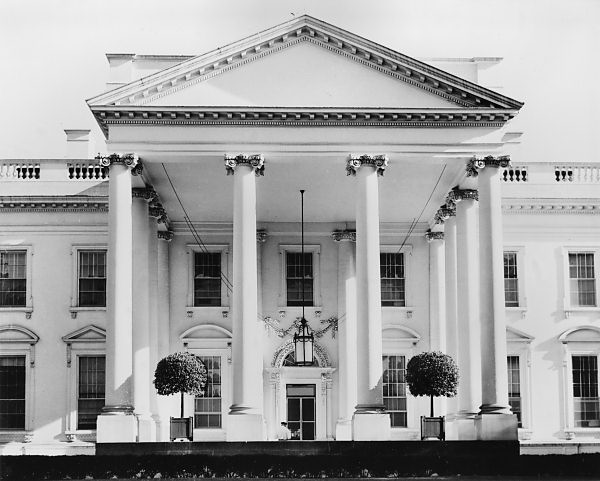
During its 1968 tour in North America, Hamilton Academy's choir sang at the White House, Washington, U.S.A.

In Washington it was arranged that the choir sing on the steps of the White House, and in Seattle the choir sang at Seattle Opera House with colleagues and hosts, the Franklin High School Choir. At Seattle airport the choir was greeted by hundreds of singing well-wishers. Dubbed "the ambassadors of song" the choir and Mr. Mooney appeared on American television and were granted honorary citizenship by Washington State. In 2008 members of that Hamilton Academy school choir of forty years before came together in Hamilton in a reunion. In October 2009 members of the Bell Canto choir from Franklin High School, Seattle, who had been welcomed by Hamilton Academy's choir during their European tour in 1966 came together in Seattle in a reunion, Seattle Mayor Greg Nickels declaring 11 October 2009, "Bel Canto Day" in honor of Dr. Richard Kohler, director, and those who participated in that choir's European tour of 1966, "Seattle's ambassadors to the world."

The North American tour by Hamilton Academy's mixed Choir in 1968 was reciprocated in 1969 when the Bel Canto youth choir of Franklin High School, Seattle, United States re-visited and undertook a month-long series of engagements in Scotland, Ireland, England and Wales. Arriving at Glasgow Central Station from London at the commencement of their tour of the UK and Ireland, the 110 members of the Bel Canto Choir were met by bag-pipes and a 200-strong welcoming party from Hamilton Academy. After engagements in Lanarkshire, the Bel Canto Choir was joined by members of the Hamilton Academy Choir for performances in Belfast and Dublin.

===== Applied and fine arts =====
Designed to catch the best light, the school's art classes and large main studio were located on the top floor; the school's art department educating, among others, the artists Louise Gibson Annand MBE, Mary Nicol Neill Armour, Peter Charles Browne, John McKinnon Crawford, David (A.) Kerr, William McCance and David Morrison. The pioneering photographer James Craig Annan was also educated at Hamilton Academy. (Refer to their entries on List of former pupils of Hamilton Academy.)

The principles of architecture were taught by the school's technical subjects department, (the school also operating the Hamilton Academy Technical School in the evenings.) The architects William Brown, John M. Crawford (the first architect to be elected President of Glasgow Art Club (1903)), Robert Forrest and Robert Hamilton Paterson were educated at Hamilton Academy. (Refer to their entries on List of former pupils of Hamilton Academy.)

===== Drama =====
In drama, performances were given by the school at public venues for communities at large. Among former pupils who went on to careers in theatre, film and television have been the actors Gordon Reid and Tom Watson, the television and radio presenter Dougie Donnelly, Alex Graham Oscar-winning film and television producer and Agnes Wilkie, former Head of Features at STV and producer of BAFTA and BAFTA Scotland award-winning films and television programmes. Former pupil Thomas Laurie OBE went on to chair the board of the Traverse Theatre and serve on the Scottish Arts Council. (Refer to their entries on List of former pupils of Hamilton Academy.)

===== Literature =====
The school's academic reputation was extremely high; this augmented by its wide range of clubs and societies, including literature. Among former pupils who pursued careers in literature have been the authors Robert Russell Calder, Colin Douglas, Robin Jenkins OBE (whose novel Happy for the Child (1953) draws on his experience of being educated at such a school as Hamilton Academy), Margery Palmer McCulloch, Robert Macnish and Walter Perrie. (Refer to their entries on List of former pupils of Hamilton Academy.)

== Staff and pupils ==
=== Staff ===
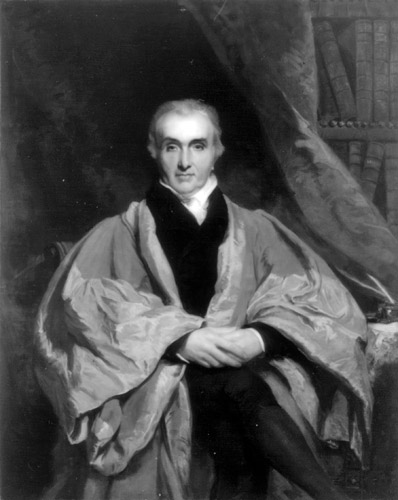
Former pupil Matthew Baillie, 1761–1823, celebrated physician and pathologist. Born Shots Manse. Snell Exhibitioner (1779) from the University of Glasgow to Balliol College, Oxford

Hamilton Academy was headed by the Rector and with such a history, a long list of educationalists served as Rector of the school. Compiled by William Munk, the Munk's Roll of former Fellows of the Royal College of Physicians, London, identifies a "Mr. Whale" as being master of the school when Matthew Baillie was a pupil (leaving the school for the University of Glasgow in 1774) and the Statistical Account of Lanarkshire of 1835 again mentions Whale, between mention of "Pillans" (or Pillance, Richard) and "Gillies", as among the "eminent teachers (who) have been masters of this school," and giving the Rev. George Shaw as master (rector) of the school at 1835. This would seem to indicate an order, but not necessarily of un-interrupted succession, of Pillans, Whale, Gillies and Shaw as Rectors and in the notice in the Glasgow Herald newspaper, 1 August 1851, of the results of the annual examinations at Hamilton Academy, William Dickson is listed as rector. Brown's Directory of Hamilton 1855–56 lists William Dickson as rector and that he was also Church of Scotland Session Clerk and Registrar of Births, Deaths and Marriages for the Burgh of Hamilton.

Identified Rectors:

from	to	Rector
		Richard Pillans or Pillance
	by 1774	Whale
		Gillies
	by 1835	Rev. George Shaw
by 1851	1863	William Dickson
1863	1897	James Blacklock
1897	1908	Donald McLeod
1908	1924	David M. Andrew
1924	1930	Dr. A. R. Murison
1930	1950	David K. Anderson MC
1950	1967	Edwin G. Macnaughton OBE JP
1968	1971	(Capt.) Alfred W.S. Dubber (Interim-Rector 1967–68)

(1971 – end of Hamilton Academy as an independent institution, A. M. Robertson, acting-Rector)

From William Dickson, the Rectors of Hamilton Academy are well recorded. Still identified as being the school's Rector in the Handbook of Hamilton published in 1862, Dickson died in 1863 and James Blacklock previously a teacher at Dundyvan Academy, Coatbridge, was appointed Rector, a position he held to 1897. In memory of Rector Blacklock pupils founded Gold Medals awarded annually for general scholarship to the Dux (boy and girl) of the school and the (James) Blacklock Bursary for pupils of Hamilton Academy to study in the Faculty of the Arts, University of Glasgow. Donald McLeod (who was later to become the first director of studies at the Jordanhill Teacher Training College) followed as Rector (1897–1908); succeeded in the Rectorship (1908–1924) by David M. Andrew (an Exhibitioner of Christ Church, Oxford) who planned the organisation, equipping and the move to the 'new' Academy building of 1913 and steered the school through World War I, and who was subsequently appointed Rector of Aberdeen Grammar School.

From 1924 to 1930 the celebrated Scottish educationalist Dr A. R. Murison was Rector of Hamilton Academy prior to his taking up the appointment as the first Rector of the then new Marr College in Troon, Ayrshire. From 1930 to 1950, the Rector was David K. Anderson (holder of the Military Cross (with bar)), followed (1950–1967) by Edwin G. Macnaughton JP, who as Rector of Hamilton Academy, was awarded the OBE in 1966 for services to education. MacNaughton was also co-author (with James Paterson) of the classic textbook series 'The Approach to Latin', which was used across Britain and the Commonwealth, and also in the United States. The academic bias of the school was such that quite a few of the textbooks used by its students had been written by its own teachers, including mathematics, English and 'Classics' textbooks. Samuel Norris Forrest, a teacher of mathematics at the school, and father of notable alumnus, the physicist John Samuel Forrest, was another master who also wrote text-books.

Succeeding Rector Macnaughton, the last Rector of Hamilton Academy was Alfred W.S. Dubber (appointed 3 April 1968), the school's principal teacher of English since 1956, and acting rector since retirement of Edwin Macnaughton in September 1967. Rector Dubber was an authority on the English language and literature and author of school text books, and on his sudden death at the school's Christmas Dance on 16 December 1971, Mr. A. M. Robertson, depute-Rector and Head of Classics, was appointed Acting Rector (Mr. James Morris being then appointed Head of Classics) prior to the abolition of selective schools (cemented in the 1976 Education Act) such as Hamilton Academy, introduction of comprehensive schooling and the merging of the Hamilton Academy campus and that of nearby St. Johns Grammar School to form a new school called Hamilton Grammar School, which draws its students from its immediate surroundings.

Hamilton Academy's last Head of Music, the late Peter Mooney, was conductor of the Glasgow Phoenix Choir (continuing from the iconic Glasgow Orpheus Choir) which choir established in his memory the Peter Mooney Scholarship in the Royal Scottish Academy of Music and Drama. [See also section above, 'Music and drama']

There was a long tradition of former pupils who had chosen teaching as a career returning to teach at their old school. For instance, Lord Robert Gibson was a former pupil who returned to teach at Hamilton Academy, one of his pupils being another future Member of parliament, Thomas Cassells (Gibson and Cassells serving as MPs over the same period, 1936–41.)

Masters at Hamilton Academy wore shorter academic gowns daily and full-length academic gowns, respective hoods and mortar boards at the annual prize-givings and on other 'high days.'

=== Pupils and school houses ===
Hamilton Academy had four 'houses' named after Lanarkshire rivers or tributaries and, given the selective nature of the intake of pupils from across the whole County of Lanarkshire, every student was allocated to one of these depending on their town or area of origin. The names of the 'houses' were Cadzow, Calder, Clutha (Scots Gaelic for Clyde) and Kilbryde (in the last two school sessions only of Hamilton Academy renamed Avon, Brandon, Clyde and Douglas (under a new 'house' system introduced by Rector Alfred Dubber.)) Each 'house' had its own House Master, and House Captains and Prefects drawn from the student body, being distinguished by the addition of braid on their blazer lapels. School uniform colours were blue with green. School badges changed over the years, from the academy's full 'armorial bearings' (shield, helmet and motto) to stylised variations of inter-twined H and A for Hamilton Academy, accompanied by the school motto (the badge illustrated above for educational purposes only, being an example of Hamilton Academy school badges.) Small coloured lapel badges were also worn, indicating 'house' membership. It is recalled that pupils at other schools referred to those attending Hamilton Academy as the 'Academy Yanks.'

=== Motto and school song ===
Hamilton Academy's motto was Sola Nobilitat Virtus ('Virtue alone ennobles') another credo being Labor Omnia Vincit ('Work conquers all'.)

Composed by Thomas Smith, and set to music by T. S. Drummond, listed as masters at Hamilton Academy when the 'new' Academy building opened in 1913, the school song of Hamilton Academy had as its last verse:

"Vivat Academia!" join the chorus, let it ring,
"Vivat Academia!" young and old we sing,
If they ask us whence thy glory,
This the secret, this the story;
Sola virtus nobilitat,
Sola virtus nobilitat.

=== Publications ===
In addition to Acta, the in-school periodical listing activities, the school published twice-yearly, and latterly, annually, the Hamilton Academy Magazine. The final such magazine was printed in London and issued in Hamilton Academy's last school session, 1971–72. Hamilton reference library holds a collection of the school's magazines, 1929–1948.

== Former pupils ==
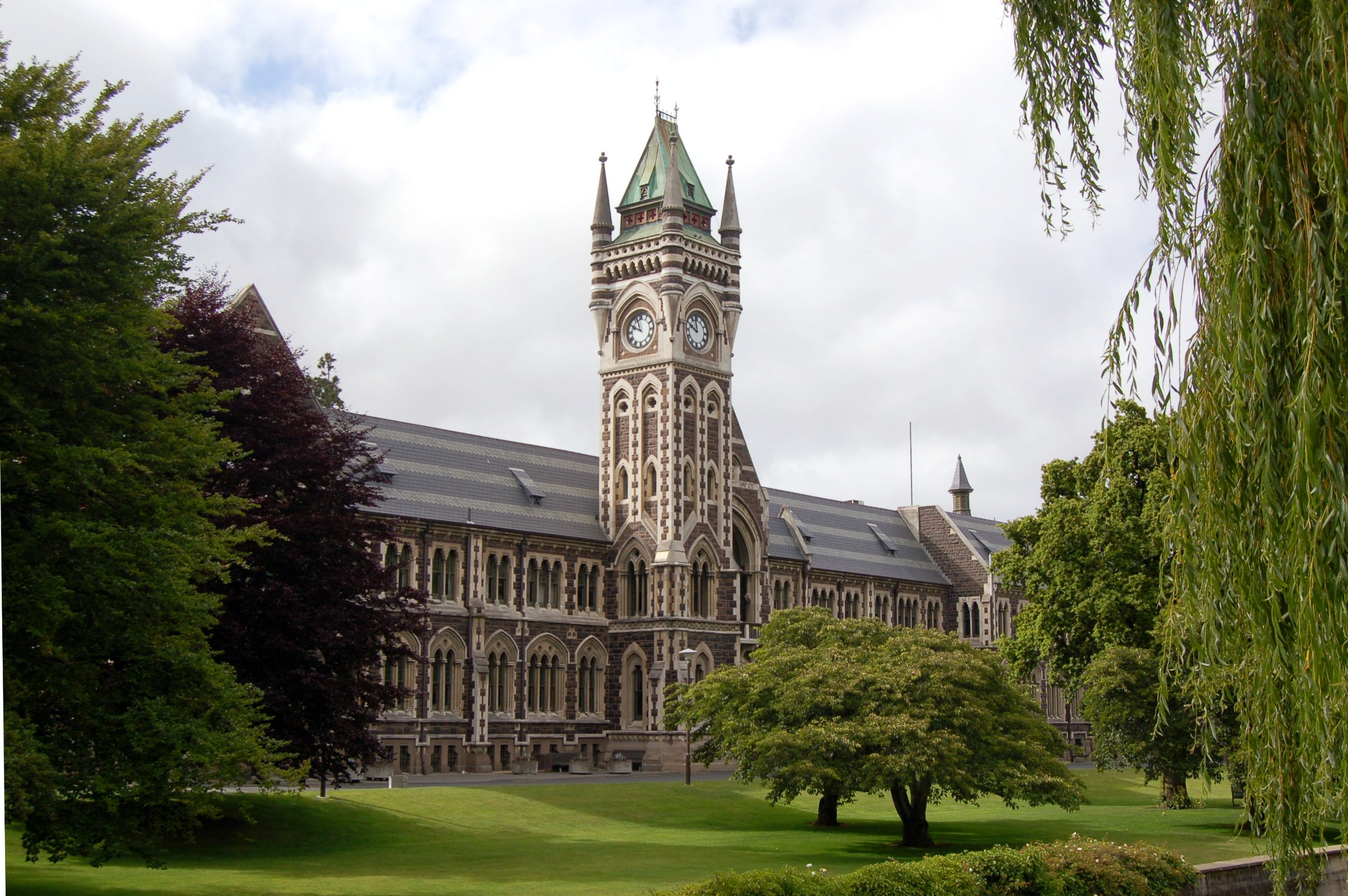
Professors Robert Jack and Robert Bell had been near contemporaries at Hamilton Academy and were later to serve together at the University of Otago, New Zealand's oldest university. The main contractor for the university buildings had been another former pupil of the Academy, Robert Forrest, who had previously emigrated to Dunedin

Those educated at the former Hamilton Academy have made and still make contributions to many spheres of endeavour in the public, business, and cultural life in Scotland and beyond. Half of the 2010 membership of the Rotary Club of Hamilton, including past presidents, were educated at the former Hamilton Academy.

A contender for the oldest surviving former pupil of Hamilton Academy is Mrs. Elsie McBroom (née MacPhail), a graduate of Glasgow University and formerly a teacher of mathematics, in Ayr, in Scotland; aged 100 in 2010.

Two former pupils and near contemporaries at Hamilton Academy were to serve together on the faculty of the University of Otago, Dunedin, New Zealand – the physicist Robert Jack and the mathematician Robert J. T. Bell. In 1914, Jack went out to take up the appointment as Professor of Physics at Otago, in 1920 being joined by Bell, appointed Professor of Pure and Applied Mathematics. They were to be faculty colleagues until Robert Jack's retirement in 1947, Robert Bell retiring the following year. Both also served as chairman of the professorial board and as dean of the Faculty of Arts and Science at the university that had been built by yet another former pupil of Hamilton Academy, Robert Forrest of the firm of McGill and Forrest, contractors, Dunedin. (Refer to their entries on List of former pupils of Hamilton Academy.)

Another former pupil of the school was John Cairncross, (1913–1995), a former Dux medallist at Hamilton Academy who went on to study at the University of Glasgow; the Sorbonne and Trinity College, Cambridge. A brilliant linguist and renowned author, in 1951 Cairncross confessed to spying for the Soviets, associated with the KGB's Cambridge Five (the "Ring of Five".) His brother was the economist Sir Alexander Cairncross, who also attended Hamilton Academy.

=== Notable former pupils ===
- John Anderson
- James Craig Annan
- Louise Gibson Annand
- Walter J D Annand
- Mary Nicol Neill Armour
- Ernest Macalpine Armstrong
- Frederick Stanley Arnot
- Struther Arnott
- Matthew Baillie
- Alastair Balls
- Robert T Beaty
- Robert J. T. Bell
- Archie Bethel
- Craig Brown
- Jock Brown
- Andrew Bryan
- John Cameron Bryce
- Alexander Cairncross
- John Cairncross
- Archibald Y. Campbell
- Matthew Campbell
- Thomas Cassells
- Ken Collins
- Graham Cox
- John McKinnon Crawford
- William Cullen
- Ian Deary
- James Stedman Dixon
- Dougie Donnelly
- Colin Douglas
- Laura Duncan
- Ian Ford
- John Samuel Forrest
- Charles Annand Fraser
- Andrew Froude
- Malcolm Gavin
- Robert Gibson
- Douglas Alston Gilchrist
- Marion Gilchrist
- Alex Graham
- Thomas Haddon
- Alexander Hamilton
- David Willis Wilson Henderson
- John Inch
- Thomas Alexander Irvine
- Robert Jack
- Robin Jenkins
- Lord Keith of Avonholm
- Robert Hamilton Lang
- Thomas Laurie
- Ian Lang Livingstone
- John Duncan Lowe
- Douglas McBain
- William McCance
- Margery Palmer McCulloch
- Margo MacDonald
- Alistair MacFarlane
- Major General John McGhie
- Edward McCombie McGirr
- Robert McIntyre
- Alastair McWhirter
- Phomas J Mackie
- Robert Macnish
- John Millar
- David Morrison
- Robert Franklin Muirhead
- David King Murray
- Robert Hamilton Paterson
- David Paton
- Walter Perrie
- Henry Cunison Rankin
- James Gordon Reid
- David Syme Russell
- James Shepherd
- Lord Stallard
- William Kilpatrick Stewart
- Alexander Burt Taylor
- Samuel Thomson
- David Thorburn
- Dr. David Warnock
- Alan Watson
- Tom Watson
- Robert Wright

== Hamilton Academy and rugby and football clubs ==
Hamilton Academy FP (former pupil) Rugby Club was founded in 1927 (closed for the duration of World War II, 1939–45) and continues as Hamilton Rugby Football Club (Hamilton RFC.) From 1946 to 1955 the 14th Duke of Hamilton, whose ancestors had endowed the school, was president of the club and in later years James Morris, Head of 'Classics' at Hamilton Academy and himself a former pupil of the school, served as club president. The club continues to play its home games at Laigh Bent, the former Hamilton Academy's playing fields.

The school gave its name to Hamilton Academical F.C., founded in 1874 by Hamilton Academy Rector James Blacklock and pupils as the 'Hamilton Academical Cricket and Football Club.' The cricket part of the name was dropped in 1877, but over time the club became known as Hamilton Academicals. The 's' was officially dropped in 1965, the club returning to Academical. On Hamilton Academicals being promoted to the First Division of the Scottish Football League in 1953, a letter to the Editor appeared in the Glasgow Herald of 13 June, suggesting that the club's directors might now consider dropping the 'Academicals' part of the name, although the correspondent acknowledges that the club was founded of "former pupils of that famous school." In testament to its foundation (by the then Rector and former pupils of Hamilton Academy) the club has retained its name, Hamilton Academical F.C. (Hamilton Accies) and is the only professional football club in Britain that was founded of a school team.

Hamilton Academy FP (former pupil) amateur football club, now Hamilton FP AFC, continues as a member of the Scottish Amateur Football League and is based at Hamilton Palace Grounds, near where the school was founded in 1588.
