= Laura Duncan =

Laura Duncan may refer to:

- Laura Duncan (sheriff)
- Laura Duncan (singer)
