= Lily McDougall =

Scottish artist (1875–1958)

- Born: 25 July 1875; Glasgow, Scotland
- Died: 21 December 1958 (aged 83); Edinburgh, Scotland
- Known for: Painter
- Father: William H McDougall

Lily Martha Maud McDougall (25 July 1875 - 21 December 1958), a.k.a. Lily McDougall, was a Scottish artist and hostess.

== Early life ==
McDougall was born in Glasgow. McDougall grew up in Glasgow and Bonnyrigg in an artistic family, and was encouraged to paint by her father, William H McDougall.

== Career ==
McDougall started her studies at the Royal Institution in Edinburgh. She later continued her studies in The Hague School of Art in Antwerp and in the Carrière Academy in Paris, after which McDougall returned to continue her work in Scotland.

McDougall had a studio at 45 Frederick Street in Edinburgh.

Inspired by his daughter's efforts to exhibit her art, McDougall's father founded the Scottish Society of Women Artists (SSWA), currently known as the Visual Arts Scotland, in 1924.

=== Art style ===
McDougall is most notably known for her flower paintings. Her paintings are mentioned to have influenced the works of William Gillies, a Scottish painter who had his studio space next to McDougall's on Frederick Street.
