= David R. Morrison (author) =

- Born: David Ralston Morrison; 4 August 1941; Glasgow, Scotland
- Died: 1 September 2012 (aged 71)
- Education: High School of Glasgow; Hamilton Academy; University of Strathclyde
- Occupations: Author; editor; painter

David Ralston Morrison (4 August 1941 – 1 September 2012) was a Scottish author, editor and painter.

== Education and career ==
David Ralston Morrison was born at Glasgow on 4 August 1941, and educated at the Glasgow High School and the Hamilton Academy before attending Glasgow College of Commerce and the University of Strathclyde, qualifying as a librarian. He subsequently held positions with Lanarkshire Library Services, Edinburgh College of Art and at Caithness, Sutherland, Scotland, as Principal Assistant Librarian. He was appointed County Librarian in 1972.

Following local authority regionalization in 1975, Morrison was appointed Divisional Librarian for Caithness and Sutherland, then Area Librarian for Caithness and Sutherland, under Highland Council.

== Literary work ==
David Morrison founded the Wick Festival of Poetry, Folk and Jazz and is the author or editor of numerous works, including books of poetry and essays, and including those on the works of Neil M. Gunn and Fionn MacColla. In 1970 he founded the Scotia Review, a radical literary magazine which he was to edit for the next 34 years, handing over the editorship in 2004.

In 1984 the National Library of Scotland held an exhibition in celebration of the magazine Scotia Review and holds copies of the magazine, and Morrison's manuscripts.

In 2006 a collection of his poems was published by Poetry Salzburg, at the University of Salzburg, titled The Cutting Edge: Collected Poems 1966-2003 by David Morrison.

David Ralston Morrison died, aged 71, 1 September 2012.
