= Peter Rogers (businessman) =

British businessman (1947–2020)

- Born: Peter Lloyd Rogers; 29 December 1947; Rugby, England
- Died: 28 January 2020 (aged 72)
- Occupation: Businessman
- Years active: 1969–2020
- Title: CEO, Babcock International
- Term: 2003–2016
- Predecessor: Gordon Campbell
- Successor: Archie Bethel
- Children: 2

Peter Lloyd Rogers, CBE (29 December 1947 – 28 January 2020) was a British businessman, who was chief executive of Babcock International Group plc, a British multinational support services company specialising in managing complex assets and infrastructure in safety- and mission-critical environments. He was previously employed by Ford Motor Company and was also an executive director of Courtaulds and deputy chief executive of Acordis.

== Early life ==
Rogers was educated at Wymondham College, Norfolk, and graduated from the University of Manchester in 1969 with a law degree. He gained ACA and FCA accountancy qualifications in the 1970s.

== Career ==
Rogers was the chief executive of Babcock International from 1 August 2003 until he retired in August 2016. He was succeeded as CEO by Archie Bethel, chief executive of Babcock's marine & technology division. He was appointed CBE in the 2011 Birthday Honours.

== Personal life and death ==
Rogers was married twice, with two children and a stepdaughter. He was a keen rugby fan.

Rogers died on 28 January 2020, at the age of 72.
