= Walter J. D. Annand =

Walter "Gus" John Dinnie Annand (21 August 1920 – 26 August 2002) was a Scottish aeronautical research engineer, academic and author.

== Biography ==
Annand was born 21 August 1920 in Uddingston, Lanarkshire, Scotland. He was the younger brother of the painter and film-maker Louise Gibson Annand (MacFarquhar) and like his sister was educated at the Hamilton Academy school, where their father was English principal. Graduating in 1940 from the University of Glasgow, with first class honours in mechanical engineering.

After graduation, in the first year of World War II, Annand began his career engaged in aircraft performance analysis at the government research facility at Boscombe Park. In 1947 he took up a post with Rolls-Royce becoming, before his 30th birthday, head of the section, involved with military research. Subsequently, he transferred to the Rolls-Royce motor-car division at Crewe, where he was the assistant chief development officer.

In 1960 Annand took up the post of lecturer in the Department of Mechanical Engineering at the University of Manchester, becoming senior lecturer within three years, and reader in 1968. Author of numerous research papers during and since World War II, in 1966 Annand wrote the textbook, The Mechanics of Machines, and in 1974, with G E Rowe, he published Gas Flow in the Internal Combustion Engine.

Annand was awarded a DSc in 1972. In the same year he was sponsored by the British Council, as visiting professor in engineering at the Middle East Technical University, at Ankara, Turkey. In 1973 he was seconded to head University of Manchester new Pollution Research Unit, returning to the Mechanical Engineering department in 1978.

Annand retired from the University of Manchester in 1987 as reader in mechanical engineering.

He married Margot Carter, and together they had two daughters. He was a keen chess player and stamp collector. He died at Biddulph, Staffordshire, on 26 August 2002.
