= Robert Wright (surgeon) =

Scottish surgeon (1915–1981)

Sir Robert Wright DSO OBE (1 March 1915 – 4 December 1981) was a senior British surgeon; a former President of the General Medical Council of Great Britain and former President of the Royal College of Physicians and Surgeons of Glasgow.

== Early life and career ==
Robert Brash Wright was born on 1 March 1915 and educated at the famous Hamilton Academy school, from which he matriculated at the University of Glasgow. Graduating MB ChB in 1937, Wright went on to serve in the Royal Army Medical Corps during World War II and at a very young age was awarded the OBE, in 1944, and the DSO, in 1945, for distinguished service.

== Later life and career ==
Rejoining civilian life, in 1946 Robert Wright was appointed assistant surgeon at Glasgow Western Infirmary. The following year he was awarded Fellowship of the Royal College of Surgeons of Edinburgh; in 1952, ChM and, in 1953 appointed Surgeon-in-Charge at the Southern General Hospital, Glasgow. Fellowship of the Royal College of Physicians and Surgeons of Glasgow followed in 1962, of which he was elected president, 1968–70. In 1968, Robert Wright was awarded Honorary Fellowship of the Royal Australasian College of Surgeons and in 1970 elected a member, and in 1980 elected president, of the General Medical Council of Great Britain.

Elected a Fellow of the Royal College of Physicians, London, in 1971, Fellowship of the Royal College of Surgeons of England followed in 1975. Knighted in 1976, Robert Brash Wright died, aged 66, on 4 December 1981.
