= Alistair Hamilton =

President Of The Law Society Of Scotland

Alexander Macdonald "Alistair" Hamilton CBE JP (11 May 1925 – 25 May 2012) was president of the Law Society of Scotland and vice-chairman of the Royal Bank of Scotland.

Born in Motherwell, Lanarkshire, Scotland on 11 May 1925, Alexander Macdonald Hamilton was educated at the Hamilton Academy.

From Hamilton Academy, Hamilton graduated MA, and LLB from the University of Glasgow. A senior partner and latterly consultant with the large Glasgow firm of solicitors, McGrigor Donald, Hamilton was also vice-chairman of the Royal Bank of Scotland Group.

A member of council and convener of the diligence committee of the Law Society of Scotland, Hamilton was to become president of the society, 1977–78. He was also a member of the Court House Committee of the Royal Faculty of Procurators in Glasgow.

Hamilton was appointed JP and, in 1978, CBE.

He was also committed to the Scout movement for most of his life, especially as Scoutmaster of the 150th Glasgow Troop attached to Cambuslang Old Parish Church, where he was an elder for over fifty years.

Alistair Hamilton died in 2012.
