= John McGhie =

Scottish psychiatrist and British Army general

Major-General John McGhie CB (1914–1985) was a Scottish-born leading Army psychiatrist, author, former Director of Army Psychiatry and President of the Ministry of Defence Army Medical Board.

== Early life and career ==
John McGhie received his education at the famous Hamilton Academy school from which he matriculated at the University of Glasgow, graduating in medicine in 1936. The following year McGhie was commissioned in the RAMC . Posted to India in 1938, he was subsequently appointed Medical Officer at the British Military Hospital at Rawalpindi and served in the Burma Campaign from 1942 to 1945, commanding 47 Field Ambulance.

Following the Second World War, McGhie achieved his Diploma in Psychiatric Medicine in 1947, subsequently serving as Command Psychiatrist in UK Commands and from 1949 to 1952 as Advisor in Psychiatry to the Far East Land Forces. For the next nine years McGhie worked at the Royal Victoria Hospital at Netley as Officer in Charge, Psychiatric Division, and latterly as Officer Commanding the hospital and in 1961 he was appointed Director of Army Psychiatry in the Royal Army Medical College. In 1967 McGhie took up the appointment as deputy director of Medical Services in the Malaya and Western Commands before returning, in 1970, to the post of Director of Army Psychiatry as well as being appointed Consultant Psychiatrist to the British Army, with the rank of Major-General.

Retiring from the Army in 1976, John McGhie continued work as a consultant psychiatrist to government bodies and was appointed President of the Ministry of Defence Army Medical Board, finally retiring in the year of his death, dying at Lenham, Kent, on 12 September 1985.

== Publications ==
Among Major General McGhie's published works were A Survey of Service Psychiatry in the Far East, Endocrine Investigations in Psychiatric Casualty in the Army and Anxiety State in the Army associated with Overacting Thyroid.

== Awards and honours ==
John McGhie was Mentioned in Despatches in 1943; awarded the Order of St. John in 1962; appointed Honorary Physician to H. M. Queen Elizabeth II in 1971; awarded the Fellowship of the Royal College of Psychiatrists in the following year and invested CB and Commander of the Order of St John in 1976.
