= John Samuel Forrest =

Scottish physicist

John Samuel Forrest FRS (20 August 1907 – 11 November 1992) was a Scottish-born physicist, writer and Professor Emeritus, University of Strathclyde.

== Early life and education ==
John Samuel Forrest was born at Hamilton, South Lanarkshire, Scotland, on 20 August 1907, one of the three children of Samuel Norris Forrest and his wife Elizabeth. Samuel Norris Forrest was a teacher of mathematics at Hamilton Academy and author of text-books on mathematics, trigonometry and calculus. He also lectured in the Department of Mining at Glasgow Technical College (becoming the University of Strathclyde in 1964.)

John Samuel Forrest attended the famous Hamilton Academy school where he won the Dux Medal, Mathematics Medal and the Science Medal, and coming third in the University of Glasgow Bursary Examination of 1925 was awarded the John Clerk (Mile End) Bursary to study Mathematics and Natural Philosophy at the university. In 1929 while still an under-graduate Forrest was admitted as a research student in the Science Faculty and awarded the Thomson Experimental Scholarship followed by the Mackay-Smith Scholarship. He also won the Thomson Prize in Astronomy and graduated in 1930 with a double degree, BSc in pure science, with a second class honours in Mathematics and Natural Philosophy.

== Career ==
Following graduation Forrest took up his first appointment, as a physicist with the Central Electricity Board, Glasgow, followed the next year (1931) with that of physicist with the Central Electricity Board at London, working on the new National Electricity Grid. His first published paper on the Grid was submitted to the Institution of Electrical Engineers in June 1931, in which month he also attended the Conference Internationale des Grands Reseau Electrique at Paris, with Thomas Allibone.

Forrest's third Paper, The electrical characteristics of 132 kV line insulators under various weather conditions was submitted to the IEE in March 1935, and a further Paper, written in 1940, was sent in February 1941, winning the Coopers Hill War Memorial Prize. In 1942 Forrest was elected a Fellow of the Royal Meteorological Society, later becoming one of the founder-editors of the publication, Weather, one of his own Papers appearing in the publication's first volume, 1946.

Forrest organized a joint meeting, October 1945, of the IEE and the RMS on the effects of weather on power systems. He continued to write scientific Papers and in 1948 was awarded D.Sc. by Glasgow University. Rising to Directorship of the new Central Electricity Research Laboratory with some 800 staff, in 1960 Forrest was invited to give the Hunter Memorial Lecture and was nominated Chairman of the Supply Section (1961–62) of the IEE, and in 1963 he gave the third John Logie Baird Memorial Lecture in the Royal College of Science and Technology and was elected President, Section A of the British Association for the Advancement of Science in Aberdeen. From November 1963 through to April 1964, Forrest gave a series of thirteen deliveries of the Faraday Lectures, plus repeats for sixth form school pupils, to a total audience of some 35,000. Also in 1964, Forrest was invited to become visiting professor at the new University of Strathclyde. By 1966, Forrest had become a member of three of the study committees of the Conference Internationale des Grands Reseau Electrique (and became Chairman of the British National Committee in 1972) and in that year, as President of Section A of the British Association for the Advancement of Science, he was invited to attend the meeting of the Indian Association (which became the Indian Science Congress) meeting in Hyderabad in 1967 where he delivered a lecture on the British electricity supply industry. In 1966, Forrest was elected a Fellow of the Royal Society and in 1972 elected to its Council. Also in 1972, he was awarded an Hon. D.Sc. by Heriot-Watt University, Edinburgh.

== Post-retirement ==
Retiring in 1973, Forrest visited Czechoslovakia and in 1975, Bulgaria, and was received by the respective academies and delivered lectures. Also in 1975, Forrest was invited by the Accademia dei Lincei, Italy, to attend an international congress on geothermal energy at which he was invited to chair the conference's final session. In 1976, with another Fellow of the Royal Society, Forrest visited the Japan Academy of Science and touring power stations and research facilities, this followed by a visit to the Egyptian Academy. Forrest was one of the Founder Fellows of the Fellowship of Engineering created in 1976 at the Royal Society and in 1977 he was awarded the Honorary Fellowship of the Institution of Engineering and Technology (which, through amalgamation, the Institution of Electrical Engineers, the IEE, had become.) In 1979 John Forrest was elected a Foreign Associate of the United States National Academy of Sciences and in 1990 was named a Professor Emeritus at the University of Strathclyde.

Dr. John Samuel Forrest, Director of the Central Electricity Research Laboratories; Professor Emeritus, University of Strathclyde; author.

Married (1940–76) Ivy May Olding. One son.

Retired 1973.

Remarried in 1985, the cousin of his first wife.

Died 11 November 1992.
