= Robert J. T. Bell =

Scottish mathematician

Robert J. T. Bell RSE FRSE (15 January 1876 – 8 September 1963) was a Scottish mathematician. He held the positions of Professor of Pure and Applied Mathematics and Dean of the Faculty of Arts and Science, at the University of Otago in Dunedin, New Zealand.

== Early life and career ==
Robert John Tainsh Bell was born to the Rev. George Bell and Margaret Walker Scott in Falkirk, Stirlingshire, Scotland, on 15 January 1876. The family moving to Hamilton, South Lanarkshire, Bell was educated at Hamilton Academy from which he matriculated at the University of Glasgow, having won a high placement in the university’s Open Bursary Competition. Bell graduated in 1898 as M.A. (with First Class Honours) in Mathematics and Natural Philosophy.

Appointed a William Ewing Fellow, Bell continued at the university as a tutorial assistant and in 1901 was promoted to junior assistant.

In 1902 he married Agnes Thomson.

== Later career ==
In 1911 Bell was appointed Lecturer in Mathematics and awarded a D.Sc. by the university for his treatise on the geometry of three dimensions, published in book form in 1910 as An Elementary Treatise on Co-ordinate Geometry of Three Dimensions. An instant success, this textbook was to be translated into other languages, including Japanese and three of the languages of the Indian sub-continent. The textbook ran to a third edition (1944) and, from 1938, chapters 1–9 were issued separately as Co-ordinate Solid Geometry. It has since been reprinted (BiblioBazaar, 2009.)

In March 1899 Bell had become a member of Edinburgh Mathematical Society and from 1911–1920 he served as editor of the Society’s journal, the Proceedings, during which time he also contributed papers such as Note on the axes of a normal section of the enveloping cylinder of a conchoid, presented to the Society’s meeting of 9 January 1914.

On 6 March 1916, Bell was elected to the Royal Society of Edinburgh, his proposers being George Alexander Gibson, Professor of Mathematics, Glasgow; the physicist Andrew Gray, Professor of Natural Philosophy, Glasgow; Robert Alexander Houstoun, and Diarmid Noel Paton, Regius Professor of Physiology, Glasgow (and eldest son of the artist Sir Joseph Noel Paton.)

In 1920 Bell was appointed Professor of Pure and Applied Mathematics at the University of Otago, Dunedin, New Zealand. At Otago he joined another former pupil of Hamilton Academy and near contemporary, the physicist Robert Jack who had also gone on to graduate from Glasgow M.A. with Honours in Mathematics and Natural Philosophy and who had also been awarded a D.Sc. from Glasgow. Robert Jack had arrived at Otago six years before Bell, in 1914, taking up the appointment as Professor of Physics. Like Robert Jack, Robert Bell went on to serve also as Chairman of the university’s Professorial Board and Dean of the Faculty of Arts and Science. (Bell also held the positions as a representative member on the Academic Board of the University of New Zealand and on the University of New Zealand Senate from 1939 to 1946.) These two former Hamilton Academy boys from Scotland were to serve together on the faculty of the University of Otago (until Robert Jack’s retirement in 1947; Bell retiring a year later) in a building built by another former pupil of Hamilton Academy, Robert Forrest of McGill and Forrest, contractors, Dunedin.

He died in Dunedin.

== Awards ==
Robert Bell received three honorary degrees during his career:

1932 LL.D., University of Glasgow

1948 Sc.D., University of Cambridge

1962 LL.D., University of Otago

He died at Dunedin, New Zealand, on 8 September 1963.
