= Andrew Bryan (engineer) =

Scottish mining engineer and academic

Sir Andrew Meikle Bryan FRSE (1 March 1893 – 26 June 1988) was a Scottish mining engineer and academic.

== Life ==
Andrew Bryan was born on 1 March 1893, the son of John Bryan, of Hamilton, Lanarkshire, and was educated at Greenfields School and at the former Hamilton Academy and is listed as a notable former pupil of the school in the Scottish Secondary Teachers' Association Magazine, February 1950, feature on Hamilton Academy in the article series 'Famous Scottish Schools'.

== Career ==
After school, Bryan began work in a local colliery and studied at evening classes. In 1912 he won a scholarship to the University of Glasgow and following an interruption for service in World War I he graduated with a BSc Mining in 1919, subsequently being awarded a DSc and in 1952 an Honorary LLD, both also from Glasgow. In 1919 he also gained his First Class Certificate of Competence in mine management.

From 1920 to 1932 he was a Junior and later Senior Inspector of Mines in the Mines Inspectorate Northern Division working in the Newcastle and Durham areas of the Division., In 1932 Bryan was appointed to the James S. Dixon Chair of Mining, in the University of Glasgow and the Royal Technical College (renamed in 1956 the Royal College of Science and Technology and in 1964 becoming the University of Strathclyde). This Chair had been endowed in 1907 by another former pupil of Hamilton Academy, James Stedman Dixon. Andrew Bryan was to hold this professorship until 1940, in which year he was appointed General Manager of the Shotts Iron Co. Ltd. in Lanarkshire, Scotland (and despite its name this was now primarily a coal mining company), becoming a Director in 1942 and the company's Managing Director in 1944.

During the Second World War Bryan was appointed Deputy Director of Mining Supplies for Britain from 1939 to 1940 and Group Production Director, Scottish Region (Ministry of Fuel and Power)in 1943.

In 1947 Bryan returned to the Mines Inspectorate as Chief Inspector of Mines in the Ministry of Fuel and Power, a post he held until 1951.

In 1951 he was appointed as a member of the National Coal Board where he was involved in the recruitment, training and development of staff, giving talks to schools and colleges and at the industry's summer schools. He retired from the Board in 1957 but continued as a consultant to the Board on health and safety and staffing matters and generally as a mining consultant.

In 1945 Bryan was elected Fellow of the Royal Society of Edinburgh and in March 1950 knighthood was conferred on him by HM King George VI at Buckingham Palace.

== Professional activity ==
Bryan was a member of various professional bodies during his career, serving as a council member and in positions of responsibility with most of them:

- Institute of Ceramics
- Institute of Fuel (Chairman, Scottish Section 1945)
- Institution of Mining and Metallurgy
- Institution of Mining Engineers (President 1950–1952; Hon. Treasurer 1957–1983)
- Mining Association of Great Britain (Chairman, Fuel Efficiency Committee 1943–46)
- Mining Institute of Scotland (President 1948–49)
- National Association of Colliery Managers (President, Scottish Branch 1942–44; President 1946)
- North of England Institute of Mining and Mechanical Engineers

The successor to a number of these bodies, the Institute of Materials, Minerals and Mining administers the award of the Sir Andrew Bryan Medal ‘'For sustained and outstanding contributions to the Institute and its activities."

Sir Andrew Meikle Bryan died on 26 June 1988.

== Family ==
Bryan married Henrietta Paterson Begg in 1922.

== Publications ==
Andrew Bryan wrote numerous technical articles in mining journals, official reports as part of his work as a Mines Inspector, but also more historical publications, including a book The Evolution of Health and Safety in Mines (1976) and articles such as:

- Bryan, A. Safety in mines Journal – Royal Society of Arts v99 1951-2, 828-843
- Bryan, A. Legislation relating to safety and health in British coal mines – history and development Mining engineer v134 1974-5, 197-203
- Bryan, A.M. A note on the development of technical and mining education in Scotland Transactions – Institution of Mining Engineers v107 1947-8, 556-566
- Bryan, A.M. HM Inspectors of Mines: a centenary address Transactions – Institution of Mining Engineers v109 1949, 875-888
- Bryan. A.M. Sixty years of colliery management Minutes of Proceedings – National Association of Colliery Managers v49 1952, 78-84
