= Margery Palmer McCulloch =

Scottish literary scholar, author and editor

Margery Greenshields Palmer McCulloch (1935 – 29 October 2019) was a Scottish literary scholar, author and co-editor of the Scottish Literary Review.

== Education and academia ==
Dr. Margery Palmer (she became McCulloch upon marrying in 1959) was educated at the former Hamilton Academy, the University of London and the University of Glasgow, and was a senior Honorary Research Fellow in Scottish Literature, University of Glasgow. She was also an elected member of Council of the Association for Scottish Literary Studies and served as Convener of the Association's Publications Board, as well as being co-editor of the Scottish Literary Review. A past Convener of the Society's Glasgow Branch, McCulloch was also a former Honorary Secretary of the Saltire Society. She contributed to literary and cultural programmes on BBC Radio and articles to newspapers and journals, including The Herald, The Scotsman and The Times Literary Supplement.

In 1999, Dr McCulloch discovered a poem by Hugh MacDiarmid which had been lost for 60 years. News of the poem's discovery was welcomed in the literary world. Dr McCulloch made the discovery whilst researching the archives of Catherine Carswell, a novelist and critic.

McCulloch died in Glasgow on 29 October 2019, aged 84.

== Works ==
McCulloch has an extensive list of published books and articles on Scottish literature and writers, her published works including:

=== Books ===
- The Novels of Neil M. Gunn: a critical study (Scottish Academic Press, 1987)
- Edwin Muir: poet, critic and novelist (Edinburgh University Press, 1993)
- The Man Who Came Back: Essays and Short Stories by Neil M. Gunn (edited with a critical introduction. Polygon, 1991. Reprinted 1998)
- Liz Lochhead's Mary Queen of Scots Got Her Head Chopped Off (Association for Scottish Literary Studies, 2000)
- A Flame in the Mearns: Lewis Grassic Gibbon: a centenary celebration (Association for Scottish Literary Studies, University of Glasgow, 2003)
- Modernism and Nationalism: Literature and Society in Scotland, 1918-1939 (Association for Scottish Literary Studies, University of Glasow, 2004), ISBN 0948877596
- Scottish Modernism and its Contexts 1918–1959: Literature, National Identity and Cultural Exchange (Edinburgh University Press, 2009)

=== Articles ===
- The Novels of Neil M. Gunn, in Lindsay, Maurice (ed.), The Scottish Review: Arts and Environment, August 1980, pp. 46 – 50, ISSN 0140-0894
- Late Starters and Early Finishers: The Predicament of Women Writers, in Ross, Raymond (ed.), Cencrastus No. 52, pp. 26 – 29, ISSN 0264-0856
