= Ian Lang Livingstone =

Scottish businessman; former chairman (born 1938)

- Born: February 23, 1938 (age 88); Hamilton, South Lanarkshire, Scotland
- Occupations: Businessman, lawyer
- Known for: Former chairman of Motherwell College and Lanarkshire Health Board
- Awards: Commander of the Order of the British Empire (CBE)

Ian Lang Livingstone CBE DL (born 23 February 1938) is a Scottish businessman; former chairman of the board of Motherwell College; former chairman of Motherwell Football Club; former chairman of Lanarkshire Health Board; and former chairman of the Lanarkshire Development Agency.

== Early life and career ==
Ian Lang Livingstone was born in Hamilton, South Lanarkshire on 23 February 1938 to Margaret Steele (née Barbour) and John Lang Livingstone. He was educated at the Hamilton Academy. From the Academy Livingstone entered the University of Glasgow, graduating with a degree in law in 1960 and subsequently engaged (1962–86) with the firm of Ballantyne & Copland, Solicitors, Motherwell, becoming a senior partner (and, since 1989, consultant solicitor.) Since 1987 he has been chairman and director of his family property investment and development company. Livingstone has been a member of the boards of numerous companies, including serving as chairman of Motherwell Football Club from 1973 to 1987.

== Public and voluntary sector appointments ==
Ian Livingstone served as chairman of the Lanarkshire Development Agency from 1991 to 2000 and as chairman of Lanarkshire Health Board (now NHS Lanarkshire) from 1993 to 2002.

A former chairman of the board of Motherwell College (1989–97), Livingstone is honorary solicitor to the Dalziel High School War Memorial Trust and since 1990, a member of the Dalziel High School Board. He has been a governor of the David Livingstone Memorial Trust since 1988, and chairman of the trust since 2008.

== Awards and honours ==
Ian Livingstone was appointed OBE in the Queen's Birthday Honours List 1993, "For services to business and to the community and health in Lanarkshire." He was appointed CBE in 1998 and, in 2008, a Deputy Lieutenant of Lanarkshire and awarded an Honorary Degree from the University of the West of Scotland in the same year.
