= Robert Jack (physicist) =

Scottish physicist and radio pioneer, New Zealand (1877–1957)

Robert Jack (4 November 1877 – 1 May 1957) was a Scottish-born physicist, professor and Dean of the Faculty of Arts and Science, University of Otago, and pioneer of radio broadcasting, New Zealand.

== Early life and education ==
Robert Jack was born in the village of Quarter, near Hamilton, Lanarkshire, Scotland, on 4 November 1877 and was educated at Hamilton Academy and the University of Glasgow, graduating MA with Honours in mathematics and natural philosophy. Thereafter he attended the University of Paris and the University of Göttingen for postgraduate study and as a result of this research, including that into the effect of magnetic fields on atoms (the Zeeman effect), Jack was awarded a DSc from Glasgow.

== University career ==
Following fours years as a lecturer in physics at Queen's University, Belfast, in 1914 Robert Jack took up the post of professor of physics at the University of Otago, Dunedin, New Zealand. During his subsequent 33 years in the Department of Physics he was to become Chairman of the university's professorial board, a member of the university Council and Dean of the Faculty of Arts and Science. In 1920 Robert Jack was joined on the university's faculty by another former pupil of Hamilton Academy, Scotland, and near contemporary, Robert Bell who had also graduated M.A. with Honours in mathematics and natural philosophy from Glasgow and who had arrived at Otago to take up the appointment as Professor of Pure and Applied Mathematics. Robert Jack and Robert Bell were to serve out the rest of their careers at the University of Otago which had been built by another former pupil of Hamilton Academy, Robert Forrest of McGill and Forrest, contractors, Dunedin.

== Pioneer of radio broadcasting, New Zealand ==
From his arrival at Otago University, and assisted by his technician, Jack Sutherland, and other staff from the university's physics department, Robert Jack undertook research and experiments in wireless radio transmission. 1920–21 saw Jack back in the United Kingdom where he researched developments in naval radio communications and equipment with his brother, Hugh Jack, a respected electrical engineer. He returned to New Zealand with equipment that was to form the basis of his radio broadcasting apparatus and on 21 May 1921 was able to transmit voice and music across the university laboratory. This led to the broadcasting on Saturday 17 November 1921 (from the university's Department of Physics) of New Zealand's first radio programme. The transmission included a rendition of the song "Hello my dearie". Further transmissions were made two nights a week, programmes consisting announcements and live and pre-recorded music; Isabella Finlay Manson (the Scottish-born matron of Knox College, University of Otago who was to become Robert Jack's wife on 22 May 1922) contributing musical content. Each programme began with five minutes of a buzzer, to allow listeners to tune their receivers. In December 1921 Jack received a telegram from Wellington reporting that his broadcast of the tune "Bells of St. Mary" had been heard in Wellington. In April 1922, an attempt was made to transmit a special broadcast specifically directed to the Philosophical Institute of Canterbury, Christchurch. Atmospheric conditions rendered this broadcast only partially successful, but in August of that year, a concert was successfully transmitted from the Allen Hall at the University of Otago.

On 11 November 1921, the Otago Radio Association had been formed by a group of enthusiasts, with Robert Jack elected Association patron. From 15 November 1922 the Association began making regular broadcasts and through the changes in 'call signs' and ownership over the succeeding decades the station, now known as Radio Dunedin, is the oldest outside North America and the fifth oldest in the world.

From 1924 Robert Jack had experimented with television transmission and in 1928, using equipment similar to that developed by John Logie Baird, he successfully transmitted a picture across his laboratory. It was, though, to be another 30 years before the first non-experimental television broadcasts in New Zealand.

Following research for the government into infra-red radiation during World War II, Robert Jack retired in 1947. His wife having predeceased him in 1941, he died at Dunedin on 1 May 1957.
