= Colin Douglas (novelist) =

Scottish novelist

Colin Thomas Currie CBE (born 1945), who writes under the pseudonym Colin Douglas, is a Scottish novelist.

== Biography ==
Born in Glasgow in 1945, Douglas was schooled at Hamilton Academy before graduating in medicine at the University of Edinburgh in 1970.

He wrote a series of mainly darkly humorous novels following the career of a young Edinburgh medical graduate (David Campbell) from the late 1960s into the 70s and possibly 80s. The characters and situations appear exaggerated, but many of the most bizarre are recognisable, but altered and occasionally composite, figures from the Royal Infirmary of Edinburgh and related institutions. The first novel, "The Houseman's Tale," was made into a short series by BBC Television in 1986 but not shown, after being held back for censorship, until 1987.

== Works ==
- The Houseman's Tale (1975)

Edinburgh: Canongate ISBN 0-903937-04-2

- The Greatest Breakthrough Since Lunchtime (1977)

Edinburgh: Canongate ISBN 0-903937-38-7

- Bleeders Come First (1979)

Edinburgh: Canongate ISBN 0-903937-68-9

- Wellies from the Queen (1981)

London: Hutchinson ISBN 0-09-143760-1

- A Cure for Living (1983)

London: Hutchinson ISBN 0-09-151320-0

- For Services to Medicine (1985)

London: Hutchinson ISBN 0-09-159540-1

- Ethics Made Easy (1985)

Mainstream ISBN 1-85158-014-X

- Hazards of the Profession (1987)

Mainstream ISBN 1-85158-065-4

A last much larger novel covered a longer timespan and was well-received as a more serious work than the earlier series.

- Sickness & Health (1991)

London: Heinemann ISBN 0-434-20424-2

Under his real name he has contributed to British Prime Minister Gordon Brown's speechwriting team.

== Honours ==
Currie was appointed Member of the Order of the British Empire (MBE) in 2016 for services to medicine and Commander of the Order of the British Empire (CBE) in the 2020 New Year Honours for charitable and political services.
