= Archie Bethel =

British businessman

- Born: Archibald Anderson Bethel; February 1953 (age 73); High Blantyre, South Lanarkshire, Scotland
- Education: Hamilton Academy; University of Strathclyde
- Occupation: Businessman
- Title: CEO, Babcock International
- Term: August 2016-
- Predecessor: Peter Rogers

Archibald Anderson Bethel CBE FREng FRSE (born February 1953) is a British businessman. He is CEO of Babcock International, and a main board director. He is president of the Society of Maritime Industries (SMI), and vice-president and treasurer of the Institution of Mechanical Engineers in Great Britain. He is a lay member of the Court of the University of Strathclyde. Bethel is the former president of Scottish Engineering, and former CEO of the Lanarkshire Development Agency.

== Early life ==
Archie Bethel was born in February 1953, in High Blantyre, South Lanarkshire, Scotland, and was educated at High Blantyre primary school, Hamilton Academy, and the University of Strathclyde, where he received a degree in mechanical engineering.

== Career ==
Bethel entered the oil industry, joining Vetco Gray in Aberdeen before being transferred to Houston, Texas in the United States to become a design engineer. While in Houston, Bethel was appointed as the director of the research and development section, but then returned to the United Kingdom in 1985, where he was promoted to the position of managing director (also known as Chief Executive) of Vetco Gray's UK Operations.

In 1991, Bethel was appointed chief executive of the Lanarkshire Development Agency, part of the Scottish Enterprise network, a position he held until April 1996. He later accepted a post as chief operating officer at Motherwell Bridge, a major engineering firm located in Motherwell, Scotland. After leaving Motherwell Bridge in January 2004, Bethel became Chief Executive of Babcock Marine, which, with over 8,000 employees at the time, was the largest provider of engineering services to the Royal Navy. During his time at Babcock Marine, Bethel oversaw the building of two Queen Elizabeth-class aircraft carriers, despite cutbacks that were announced in the 2010 Strategic Defence and Security Review. In April 2010, Bethel was appointed to the main board of directors of Babcock International Group PLC.

In January 2016 it was announced that Peter Rogers, CEO of Babcock since 2003, would retire in August 2016, and be succeeded by Bethel, chief executive of Babcock's Marine & Technology division, who will become chief operating officer from April.

In February 2020 it was announced that Bethel would be retiring as CEO of Babcock International after being in the role for more than three years. Bethel is expected to stay in the role until a successor is found.

== Awards and honours ==
- Officer of the Most Excellent Order of the British Empire (awarded 1996)
- Vice-president and treasurer of the Institution of Mechanical Engineers (2001–present)
- Fellow of the Royal Academy of Engineering (elected in 2003) and in 2010, a Fellow of the Royal Society of Edinburgh.
- President of Scottish Engineering (2003-2005)
- Commander of the Most Excellent Order of the British Empire (awarded 2008)
- Honorary Doctor of Science from the University of Strathclyde (awarded November 2009)
