= Peter Mooney (conductor) =

Peter Mooney (18 September 1915 – 19 September 1983) was a Scottish educator and conductor of the renowned Glasgow Phoenix Choir.

Born in 1915, Peter Mooney was to follow a career as a teacher of music and was to become the last principal of Music at Hamilton Academy. In 1955 Mooney was appointed conductor of the Glasgow Phoenix Choir founded in 1951 by members of the former Glasgow Orpheus Choir, established in 1901 by Sir Hugh Roberton. Mooney was to serve as the conductor of the Glasgow Phoenix Choir until his death 28 years later. Under Peter Mooney's leadership the Glasgow Phoenix Choir "toured the United States and Europe, winning friends and prestigious awards on its travels", and since 1960 has engaged in many tours in Europe and North America and appeared at prestigious venues and events, including the BBC Proms at the Royal Albert Hall, London.

As Principal of Music at Hamilton Academy, Mooney conducted the school's choirs. In December 1961 Hamilton Academy's mixed choir joined the Glasgow Phoenix Choir for a choral concert at Hamilton Town Hall (joining them again in a concert in 1967). In 1962 the school's mixed choir achieved the highest mark in the Glasgow Music Festival, in addition to the Festival's highest award, the Ailie Cullen Memorial Trophy, being won by Ian McGregor, a former pupil of Hamilton Academy. Under Peter Mooney's baton, Hamilton Academy's (mixed) Choir issued recordings and appeared on British radio and television programmes and performed internationally. In 1968 Peter Mooney and the Academy's choir undertook a tour of North America that included performances at the White House, Washington, U.S.A., the Seattle Opera House, Brooklyn Academy of Music and the Cathedral of St. John the Divine, New York. Dubbed "the ambassadors of song" the choir and Mr. Mooney appeared on American television and were granted honorary citizenship by Washington State.

Following his death at Hamilton in 1983, the Glasgow Phoenix Choir established in his memory the Peter Mooney Scholarship in the Royal Scottish Academy of Music and Drama.
