= Robert Macnish =

Scottish physician and writer (1802–1837)

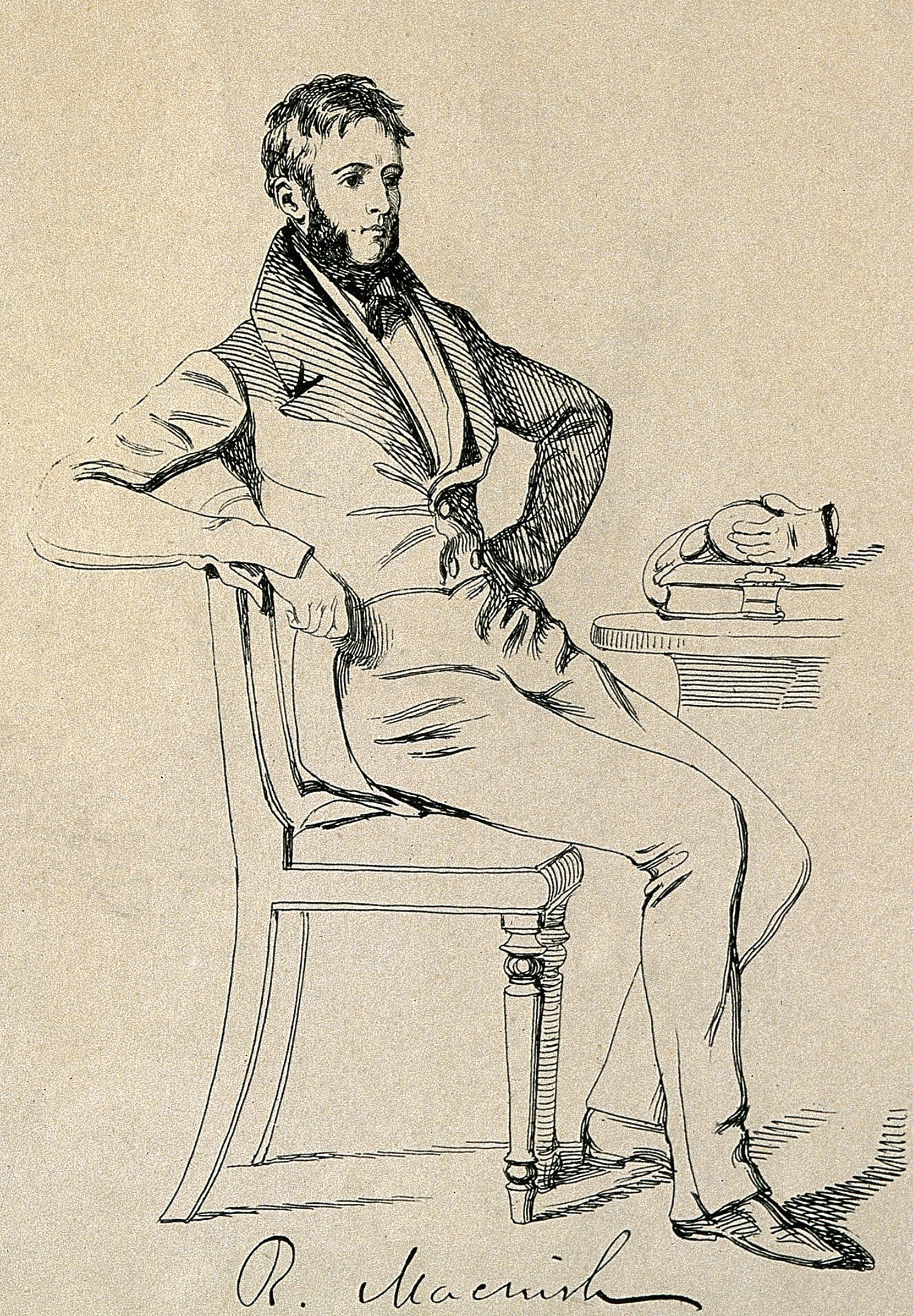
Robert Macnish by Daniel Maclise

Robert Macnish (15 February 1802 – 16 January 1837) was a Scottish surgeon physician, philosopher and writer.

== Early life and education ==
Robert Macnish was born at Henderson’s Court, Jamaica Street, Glasgow. His father and grandfather were doctors and after private education in Glasgow and at the long-established Old Grammar School of Hamilton (renamed the Hamilton Academy in 1848), Robert Macnish undertook his medical studies at the University of Glasgow obtaining a C.M. degree in 1820 and an M.D. in 1825. In 1827 he became a Member of the Faculty of Physicians and Surgeons of Glasgow (now known as the Royal College).

== Career and further studies ==
Macnish’s first professional appointment was as an assistant to a doctor (Henderson) in Caithness, north Scotland. It was during his eighteen months there that he began his philosophical studies and composed his first literary works, including The Tale of Eivor, a Scandinavian Legend, and the Harp of Salem, published in the Inverness Journal. Other works, in prose and verse, were published in the Literary Melange and the Emmet periodicals and in 1822 he submitted to the Edinburgh Magazine the short stories Macvurich the Murderer and The Dream Confirmed, both based on real incidents he learned of during his time in Caithness.

Returning to Glasgow, Macnish then journeyed to Paris where for a year he continued his medical and literary studies and tried to regain his health, damaged during his time in the north of Scotland. From Paris he returned to Glasgow as an assistant to his doctor father and to complete his medical studies, gaining his M.D. from Glasgow University in 1825. In that same year he became a Member of the Faculty of Physicians and Surgeons of Glasgow, giving as his inaugural thesis an essay on The Anatomy of Drunkenness, which he later published in 1827. This was to be expanded until a fifth edition, published in 1834.

== Later works ==
It was from 1825 that Robert Macnish’s association with Blackwood's Magazine began with the publication, as a leading article, of his story The Metempsychosis, followed by publication of his Man with the Nose, and the Barber of Gottingen. 1826 brought publication of his Adventures of Colonel O’Shaughnessy and Who can it be?, and for Macnish the epithet, 'Modern Pythagorean'. His other works included Execution at Paris, Night near Monte Video, A Vision of Robert Bruce, The Philosophy of Sleep, and his Book of Aphorisms, published in 1833. His Introduction to Phrenology followed in 1835.

Macnish’s works were to be translated into French and German, and re-published in the United States. In 1835 he was awarded the honorary degree of LL.D. by Hamilton College, United States.

Contracting influenza that developed into typhus fever, Robert Macnish died at Glasgow and was interred in the cemetery of St. Andrew’s Episcopal Chapel, Glasgow. His portrait by Daniel Maclise, and published by James Fraser as a lithograph in 1835, is held in the National Gallery, London.

== Published works ==
Among the published works by Robert Macnish (or as co-author,) published in his lifetime or re-published after his death in 1837 were:

- The Philosophy of Sleep (Published in three editions from 1830–1836)
- The Constitution Of Man by George Combe, John Foster and Robert Macnish (Original publisher S. Andrus & Son, 1835, republished 10 August 2011)
- The Anatomy of Drunkenness (First published in 1827, and based on his doctoral thesis of a year two years earlier. Re-published 1836)
- An Introduction to Phrenology in the Form of Question and Answer (Published 1836)
- An introduction to phrenology (Published 1837)
- The Modern Pythagorean: a series of tales, essays, and sketches, Volume 2 (Robert Macnish and David Macbeth Moir. Publisher W. Blackwood and Sons, 1838)
- Tales, essays, and sketches (Published 1844)
- The Book of Aphorisms (Originally published 1833, re-published 1859)
- The Confessions of an Unexecuted Femicide
- The Angel and the Spirit
