= David Paton (doctor) =

Scottish medical officer

Lieutenant-Colonel David Paton (30 July 1912 – 10 July 2008) was a Scottish medical officer who was part of the St Nazaire raid of World War II, sometimes called "The Greatest Raid of All."

== Early life and education ==
David Paton was born at Hamilton, South Lanarkshire, Scotland, on 30 July 1912 and was educated at the Hamilton Academy. Paton entered the University of Glasgow reading Medicine; at university joining the Officer Training Corps.

== The War Years ==
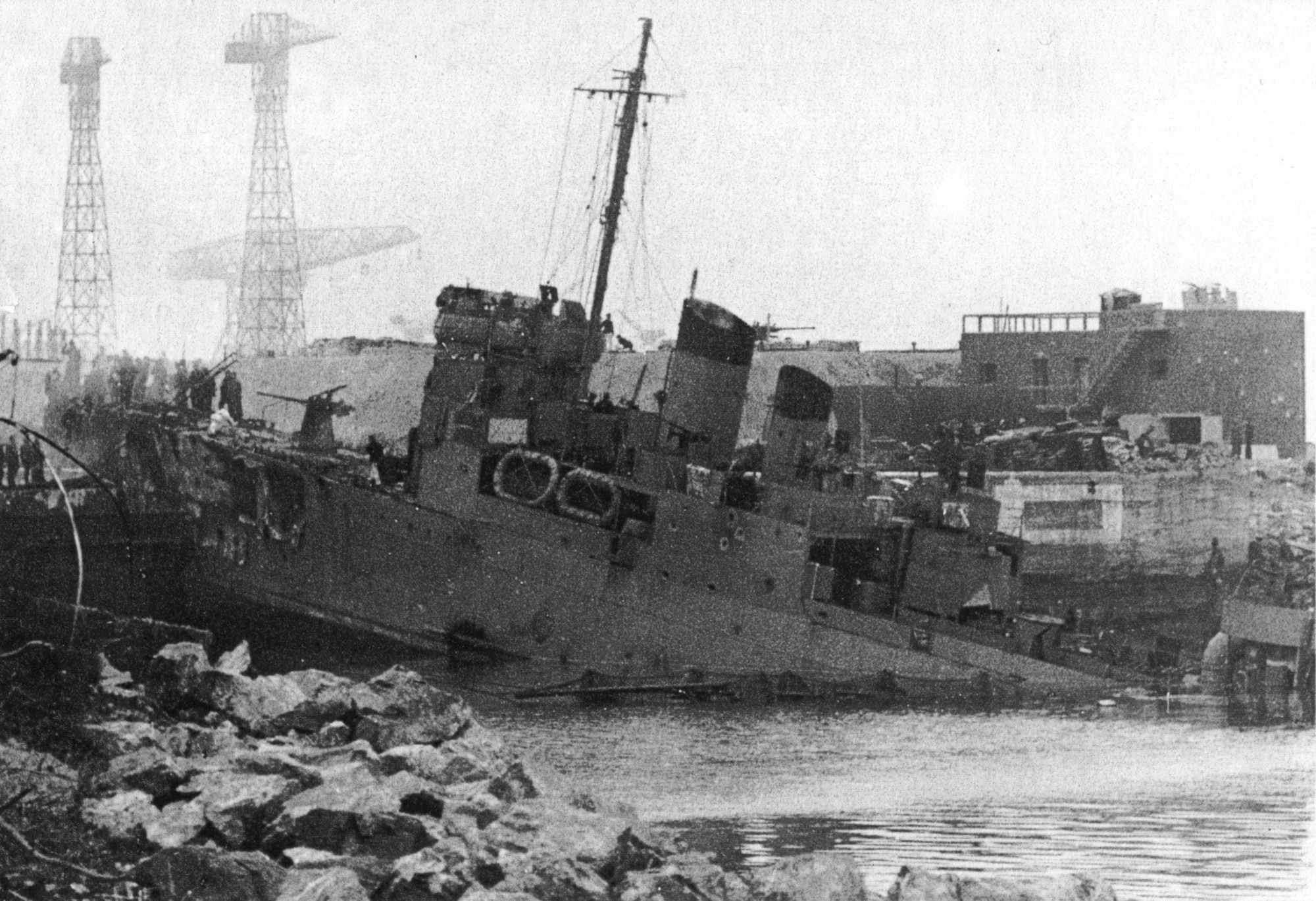
The wreck of HMS Campbeltown used in the St Nazaire raid

On graduation, Paton worked at the Western Infirmary, Glasgow, before he was called up to serve in the Royal Army Medical Corps in 1939. After serving at the War Office and several army camps in southern England, he was appointed as the medical officer to the garrison at Catterick, Yorkshire, England. Around Christmas 1941, he was transferred to the Orkney Isles and subsequently was appointed to Ayr where he was the seconded to the Commandos.

During his time with the commandos, he took part in the raid on the dry dock at the German-occupied French port of St. Nazaire (Operation Chariot) on 28 March 1942. This attack, behind enemy lines, aimed to neutralise the ability of the Germans to use the dock to base ships that could attack the Atlantic supply lines to Britain. The dock was the only one on the Atlantic coast of occupied France large enough to accommodate capital ships such as the German battleship Tirpitz. On 6 June 1944, Paton again went into action with the commandos when he landed at Sword, Normandy, as second-in-command of 223 Field Ambulance of the 1st Special Service Brigade.

He retired from the Army as a Lieutenant-Colonel. In 2002, he provided first-hand background information to the Channel 4 television series on the history of the commandos.

== Retirement ==
On his retirement from General Practice in Buckinghamshire, England, in 1972, Paton was appointed a police surgeon for the Thames Valley Police Force. He was also president of the Windsor Medical Society and secretary of the Thames Valley division of the British Medical Association, of which he was elected an Honorary Member.

Lieutenant-Colonel Dr. David Paton died aged 95 at Slough, Berkshire, England, on 10 July 2008.
