= Thomas Allibone =

English physicist

Thomas Allibone CBE FRS
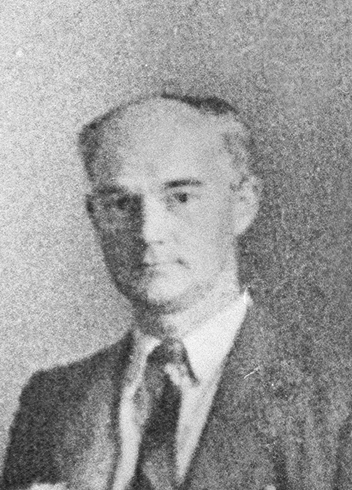
- Thomas Allibone, Manhattan Project
- Born: 11 November 1903; Sheffield, West Riding of Yorkshire, England
- Died: 9 September 2003 (aged 99); Holyport, Berkshire, England
- Scientific career
- Fields: Particle physics

Thomas Edward Allibone, CBE, FRS (11 November 1903 – 9 September 2003) was an English physicist. His work included important research into particle physics, X-rays, high voltage equipment, and electron microscopes.

== Early life ==
Thomas Edward Allibone was born at Nether Hallam, Sheffield in 1903, son of Henry James Allibone, a schoolteacher, and Eliza (née Kidger), a farmer's daughter. He was educated at the Central School in Sheffield, followed by a Pass (Ordinary) degree in physics at Sheffield University at the age of twenty. In 1925, Allibone was awarded a scholarship by the Metropolitan-Vickers company to study the properties of zirconium, and received a PhD from Sheffield University the following year. He left Sheffield in 1926 with a Wollaston scholarship to conduct research at Gonville and Caius College, Cambridge. At Cambridge, he worked in the prestigious Cavendish Laboratory, with eminent scientists such as Rutherford, Cockcroft, and Walton. The use of high voltages to accelerate particles into each other became of particular interest to him. After gaining a further PhD in physics from Cambridge, Allibone returned to Metropolitan-Vickers, to take charge of their high-voltage research laboratory at Trafford Park, Manchester.

== Career ==
Allibone remained at Metropolitan Vickers throughout the 1930s and 1940s, publishing a number of scientific papers on subjects such as high voltage research, and X-ray tubes.

During the Second World War, Allibone was involved in a number of research projects including radar equipment and the highly secretive Tube Alloys project. In 1944 Allibone lead part of a team of British scientists sent to the United States, to work on the Manhattan Project, which developed the world's first atomic bomb.

In 1946, Allibone was appointed director of the AEI research laboratories at Aldermaston Court. Whilst at Aldermaston Court, Allibone was involved in pioneering research into nuclear fusion and electron microscopes, and was elected a Fellow of the Royal Society in 1948.

In 1963, Allibone left Aldermaston Court to become the Central Electricity Generating Board's chief scientist, a post he held until 1970. He also became External Professor of Electrical Engineering at the University of Leeds in 1967.

Allibone was one of the sponsors of the election to Fellowship of the Royal Society of his friend, the physicist John Samuel Forrest, Director of the Central Electricity Research Laboratory. Allibone wrote the obituary on Forrest, published by the Royal Society in 1994.

== Honours ==
In 1959, he presented both the Bernard Price Memorial Lecture in South Africa and the Royal Institution Christmas Lectures.
