= James Shepherd (biochemist) =

Professor James Shepherd FMedSci (1944–2022) is a world-leading pioneer in the investigation of the causes, prevention and treatment of coronary heart disease.

== Education ==
Shepherd attended the Hamilton Academy in South Lanarkshire, Scotland, from which he entered the University of Glasgow. Graduating BSc in 1965, Shepherd achieved MB ChB with Honours in 1968 and gained PhD in 1972.

== Career ==
From 1969 to 1972, James Shepherd held the post of lecturer in biochemistry and from 1972 to 1988, Senior Lecturer in the University of Glasgow, and in 1988 was appointed Professor and head of the Department of Vascular Biochemistry in the University of Glasgow and was to become the principal investigator in the West of Scotland Coronary Prevention Study (WOSCOPS), examining the levels of fat in the blood. From this double-blind controlled trial, he and his colleagues were to make a break-through discovery in that cholesterol-lowering statins reduce the risk of first heart attack rather than just the benefits in these being administered to patients who had already experienced a heart attack.

== Studies results ==
The results of the WOSCOPS study and trial were simultaneously presented at the Annual Conference of the American Heart Association (November, 1995) and in The New England Journal of Medicine. The study findings have led to treatment by administering of pravastatins being adopted around the world in prevention of ischaemic heart disease. In November 2002, Shepherd presented the results of a further study, 1998–2002, ((PROSPER), investigating the benefits of cholesterol-lowering in the elderly, and conducted in The Netherlands, Ireland and the United Kingdom), to the American Heart Association in Chicago. In 2004, the United Kingdom became the first country in the world to make statins available without prescription.

== Later career ==
Serving also as Honorary Consultant at the University of Glasgow Royal Infirmary 'till 2005, Shepherd has subsequently been appointed (2006) Emeritus Professor, Cardiovascular and Medical Sciences, University of Glasgow. A former Chairman of the European Atherosclerosis Society, and a Founder member of the British Hyperlipidaemia Association and the Asian-Pacific Society of Atherosclerosis and Vascular Disease, James Shepherd has also spent time teaching abroad, at the Baylor College of Medicine, Texas, the Cantonal Hospital, Geneva, and the University of Helsinki. Shepherd is a Fellow, Royal Society of Edinburgh; Fellow, Academy of Medical Sciences; Fellow, Royal College of Physicians and Surgeons of Glasgow and Fellow, Royal College of Pathologists.

Professor Shepherd has written widely, his Papers including: Lipoproteins in Coronary Heart Disease (1986), Atherosclerosis: Developments, Complications and Treatment (1987), Coronary Risks Revisited (1989), Lipids and Atherosclerosis Annual 2003 (2003), Statins: The HMG CoA Reductase Inhibitors in Perspective (Taylor & Francis; 2 edition (16 April 2007)
