= James Stedman Dixon =

Scottish coal-mine owner and philanthropist

- Born: 8 January 1845; Glasgow, Scotland
- Died: July 18, 1911 (aged 66); Fairleigh, Bothwell, South Lanarkshire
- Education: Hamilton Academy; University of Glasgow
- Occupations: coal-mine owner Mining Institute of Scotland (President); Institution of Mining Engineers of Great Britain (President)
- Spouse: Isabella Douglas

James Stedman Dixon (8 January 1845 – 18 July 1911) was a leading Scottish coal-mine owner, president of the Mining Institute of Scotland and of the Institution of Mining Engineers of Great Britain, and founder of the James S. Dixon Chair of Applied Geology in the University of Glasgow.

== Early life and education ==
James Stedman Dixon was born at Glasgow on 8 January 1845, son of stockbroker Peter Watson Dixon and Jane Dow. The family moving to Hamilton in 1850, James Dixon attended the prestigious Hamilton Academy school, later attending classes in engineering at the University of Glasgow under Professor Macquorn Rankine.

== Career ==
Apprenticed in 1863 to George Simpson, mining engineer of Glasgow, Dixon was to be made a partner in the Simpson firm in 1869, and on George Simpson's death in 1871, took over the whole business. In the following year, Dixon started the Bent Colliery Company which was to become the largest mining operation in the Hamilton area. In 1890 Dixon expanded his interests by acquiring the mining division of James Dunlop and Co., of Clyde Iron Works, subsequently giving up his engineering business to concentrate on his mining interests which between them were producing some 1,250,000 tons of mined coal per annum. By 1898 his Bent Colliery business having greatly increased, Dixon was able to give up his interest in the Dunlop concern to concentrate on other interests, becoming chairman of the Broxburn Oil Company and a director of both the Edinburgh Colliery Company and the Plean Colliery, among other business concerns.

== Appointments and interests ==
Dixon was twice elected to serve as President of the Lanarkshire Coalmasters' Association, and was to become the first President of the Coalmasters' Insurance Association, formed as a result of the requirements of the Workmen's Compensation Act. He was later to serve (twice) as president of the Mining Institute of Scotland (eventually through mergers becoming in 2002 the Institute of Materials, Minerals and Mining), and as President of the Institution of Mining Engineers of Great Britain; and was appointed to the Royal Commission on Coal Supplies.

In 1902 Dixon endowed a Lectureship in Mining Engineering in the University of Glasgow increasing this endowment in 1907 to found the James S. Dixon Chair of Mining, appointments being made jointly between the University of Glasgow and the Royal Technical College (renamed in 1956 the Royal College of Science and Technology and in 1964 becoming the University of Strathclyde). In 1932, another notable former pupil of Hamilton Academy, Andrew Bryan was appointed to this chair, as Professor of Mining. The founding ordnance being repealed in 1980, in 1989 the funds were relocated to found the present James S. Dixon Chair of Applied Geology in the University of Glasgow. For his services to education, James Dixon was awarded the degree of LLD by the university.

In addition, Dixon founded the Dr. James S. Dixon Bursary in Mining Engineering for pupils in technical subjects at Hamilton Academy, to assist them in attending the University of Glasgow, Faculty of Engineering. As a university benefactor, James Stedman Dixon is formally remembered annually on Glasgow University's Commemoration Day.

A leading member of the Conservative Party in Lanarkshire, Dixon twice served as President of North-East Lanarkshire Conservative Association, in addition to his appointments as a J.P. and Income Tax Commissioner for Lanarkshire. Married to Isabella Douglas in 1883, the couple had no children.

James Stedman Dixon died at his home, Fairleigh, in Bothwell, South Lanarkshire, on 18 July 1911.
