= Louise Gibson Annand =

Scottish painter and filmmaker (1915–2012)

Louise Gibson Annand MBE
- Born: 27 May 1915; Uddingston, Scotland
- Died: 6 January 2012 (aged 96); Glasgow, Scotland
- Education: University of Glasgow
- Known for: Painting, film
- Spouses: Alastair Matheson, Roderick MacFarquhar

Louise Gibson Annand-MacFarquhar MBE (27 May 1915 – 6 January 2012) was a Scottish painter and film-maker. She was a major contributor to Scottish documentary and was an influential female film-maker in a field that was dominated mostly by males.

== Personal life ==
Annand was born in Uddingston, on 27 May 1915, to Emma Gibson and Walter D. Annand, both teachers. She attended Hamilton Academy where her father was English Principal. Her younger brother, Walter J. D. Annand, also attended the Academy and went on to become an aeronautical engineer and academic.

During her lifetime Annand married twice, her first husband was Alastair Matheson of Skye. After the death of her first husband, Annand subsequently married Roderick MacFarquhar, the secretary of the Highland Fund (precursor of the Highlands and Islands Development Board) and a former member of the International Brigade in the Spanish Civil War. With MacFarquhar she travelled all over the world, visiting places such as Lapland, Cuba, China, the Faroes, Russia and Barbados before he, too, predeceased her in 1989.

Some of Annand's other interests included the Soroptimists, climbing - she was a member of the Scottish Ladies Climbing Club, she managed to make it up almost every Munro - and the SNP.

== Education and work ==
In 1933, she entered the University of Glasgow, graduating in 1937 with an MA (Hons) in English literature and language. While studying for her degree Annand took evening classes in art. After university she attended Jordanhill Training College, where the College art master gave her lessons in art and encouraged her to attend evening classes at Glasgow School of Art. On completing college she went on to work as a teacher in various schools in Glasgow. In the summer of 1946 she spent time at Carradale in Argyll working on the illustrations for Naomi Mitchison's novel, The Bull Calves (1947). She joined the Schools Museums Service in 1949 as an assistant at Kelvingrove Art Gallery and Museum, and from 1970 to 1980 as the Museums Education Officer.

Annand produced 16mm films including the first-ever film about Charles Rennie Mackintosh in 1965. She was involved in and directed many other films throughout her life, though she dedicated a lot of time to her art as well. She first put her art-work on display in 1945 though participated in various solo and group exhibitions following. Her art mainly explores barren landscapes of unfrequented areas, mostly in Glasgow. Her style as an artist changed over time, influenced in part by The Glasgow Boys. She also painted abstracts, working with varied materials from pastels to watercolour. She produced her own publication in 1988, A Glasgow Sketch Book: A Quarter-Century of Observation, in which she depicted Glasgow architecture that was to be torn down. The last piece of art she exhibited before she died was a nude and she was honoured with a retrospective exhibition at the Lillie Gallery in Milngavie when she was 90.

Throughout her career, Annand was involved in arts and arts-related organisations and was Chairman of the Scottish Educational Film Association (SEFA) (Glasgow Production Group) and of the Glasgow Lady Artists Club Trust (becoming in 1975, the Glasgow Society of Women Artists of which she was twice elected President (1977–79 and 1988–91).) She was also a National Vice-Chairman, Scottish Educational Media Association (SEMA) (1979–84); twice President of the Society of Scottish Women Artists (1963–66 and 1980–85) (eventually evolving into Visual Arts Scotland) and a Member of the Royal Fine Art Commission for Scotland (1979–86).

In addition, Annand was a Visiting Lecturer (1982) in Scottish Art to the University of Regina, Canada; Chairman of the J.D. Ferguson Foundation from 1982 to 2001, and twice a member of the Business Committee, General Council, University of Glasgow (1981–85 and 1988–91).

In 1993, Annand was elected an Honorary Member of the Saltire Society; an Honorary Member of Visual Arts Scotland; awarded DUniv by Glasgow University in 1994; and appointed MBE.

Papers relating to her studies at the Hamilton Academy; the University of Glasgow and Jordanhill Training College (together with papers of her father from his time as an undergraduate at the University of Aberdeen) are deposited with the University of Glasgow Archives.

== Filmography ==
Year	Film title	Credit/s
1953	At the Museum	director
c. 1955	Annual Art Competition	director
c. 1955	Making a Sporran in Leather	editor
1956	Sauchiehall Street Roof Tops	director
1957	Avantgarde Puddle	director and camera
c. 1958	Application of Experiments Part 1	producer and editor
1958	Rhum and Water/ LSCC 50th Anniversary	director
1959	History of Lighting	director
c. 1960	Application of Experiments Part II	producer and editor
c. 1962	Application of Experiments Part III	producer and editor
c. 1962	History of Glasgow Tramcars	camera and editing
1962	City of Glasgow	director
1962	The Green of Glasgow	producer
1962	Little Miss Muffet	flash cards
1965	Charles Rennie Mackintosh	co-director
1968	Life in the Scottish Highlands - Population and Social Problems	sc. and ph.
1971	Sir William Bruce: Architect	educational advisor
1973	Robert Adam: Architect	educational advisor

(From the Scottish Screen archive.)
