= Thomas Alexander Irvine =

Colonel Thomas Alexander Irvine DSO TD DL (24 June 1907 – 5 May 1963) was a Scottish career soldier and former Commander of the 7th Battalion Worcestershire Regiment, leading the capture of Mandalay, Burma, during World War II.

Irvine was born in Dalziel, Motherwell, into the family of the iron and steel merchants Irvine Brothers of Glasgow. He was the son of Thomas Alexander Irvine and Elizabeth Younger Bowman Irvine. He was educated at the Hamilton Academy.

== Career ==
May 1932 - commissioned into the Cameronians (Scottish Rifles) Territorial Army, joining the 6th (Lanarkshire) Battalion, the Cameronians as a 2nd Lieutenant

May 1935 - promoted to Lieutenant

June 1937 - promoted to Captain

September 1939 – promoted to Major, and second-in-command of the 10th Cameronians

October 1942 – August 1945 - held the rank of T/Lieutenant-Colonel

February 1945 - took command of the 7th Battalion Worcestershire Regiment at Legyi, Burma

May 1945 - awarded the DSO for his part in the crossing of the Irrawaddy River and capture of Mandalay.

March 1946 - awarded the Territorial Efficiency Decoration (and 1st Clasp in 1951)

April 1946 – appointed Honorary Lieutenant-Colonel

May 1947 – granted substantive rank for Lieutenant-Colonel

1948 – transferred from the active duty list to the TA officers' reserve list and appointed commandant of the county cadets; thereafter chairman of T.A.F.A. (Territorial and Aux. Forces' Association) in Lanarkshire, Scotland.

December 1950 – appointed a Deputy Lieutenant of the County of Lanark

August 1962 - granted the rank of Honorary Colonel on 22 August 1962 on retiring from the Army

Colonel Thomas Alexander Irvine died at Symington, South Lanarkshire, Scotland.
