= Samuel James Thomson =

Samuel James Thomson (27 September 1922 – 4 March 2006), also known as Sam Thomson, was a Scottish chemist and author, and was reader, titular professor and director of chemical laboratories at the University of Glasgow.

Born in Hamilton, South Lanarkshire, Thomson was educated at Hamilton Academy. He entered the University of Glasgow in 1940, interrupting his studies to join the army in 1943. Commissioned into the Royal Signals Thomson served as a lieutenant in India and Malaya and, returning to Glasgow in 1946, graduated BSc in 1947 and PhD in 1951, and later, DSc in 1966.

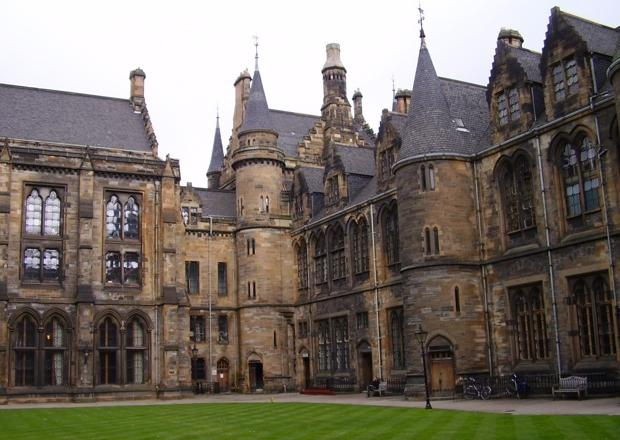
University of Glasgow West Quadrangle

After six years as lecturer in chemistry at the University of Durham (1951–57), Thomson returned to the University of Glasgow as lecturer in chemistry, thereafter promoted to senior lecturer, in 1961; reader, in 1968; and, in 1973, titular professor. In 1970 Thomson had also been appointed assistant director of the chemical laboratories, leading in 1979 to his appointment as director and head of department, a post he held until he retired in September 1987. Thomson went on to serve on the British Railways Board, Scottish Committee, from 1989 to 1994; as a consultant to British Rail's Railfreight Distribution from 1994 to 1996; and consultant to EWS from 1997 to 1998; and to Freightliner, in 1999, being also a director, from 2001 to 2002.

Elected associate of the Royal Institute of Chemistry in 1949, and fellow in 1955, Thomson was also a member of the Chemical Society, and the Faraday Society. From 1959 he was also a university scientific training officer for the Scottish Home Department on aspects of nuclear warfare. Professor Thomson was elected fellow of the Royal Society of Edinburgh on 4 March 1974. Author of numerous articles and papers, Thomson co-wrote, with Professor Geoffrey Webb, the book Heterogeneous Catalysis (1967).

In 2011 Thomson's grandson donated money in his memory to the Riverside Museum and "In Memory of Samuel James Thompson" can now be found on the electronic donors wall within the building. On 20 January 2012 Thomson's great-grandson was born and named Samuel Jack McCormick in his honor.

== Books ==
- "Papers of Samuel James Thomson, 1922-2006, chemist, director of chemical laboratories, University of Glasgow, Scotland, 1979-1987". University of Glasgow Archive Services. Archived from the original on 13 August 2011.
- "Biography of Samuel James Thomson". University of Glasgow.
- "Samuel James Thomson". Frost's Scottish Who's Who. Archived from the original on 7 November 2007.
- Webb, G. "Samuel James Thomson" (PDF). Royal Society of Edinburgh. Archived from the original (PDF) on 4 October 2006.
