= John Inch =

Scottish policeman (1911–1993)

Sir John Ritchie Inch CVO CBE QPM (14 May 1911 – 22 November 1993) was a police officer who was successively Chief Constable of three Scottish police forces.

Inch was born in Lesmahagow, Lanarkshire, Scotland. At the age of eleven he was selected to attend the Hamilton Academy. He then entered the University of Glasgow, graduating MA in law.

Joining Lanarkshire Constabulary in 1931 and posted to Bellshill police station, Inch was promoted sergeant in 1936. Undertaking further studies, Inch obtained an LLB and in 1938, at the age of 27, was promoted to inspector in charge of recruit training. He qualified as an Air Raid Precautions (ARP) instructor and became the organiser of civil defence in Lanarkshire on the outbreak of World War II.

In 1943, at the age of 32, Inch was appointed Chief Constable of Dunfermline Burgh Police. When, in 1949, this merged with Kirkcaldy and Fife County Constabularies into the combined Fife Constabulary, he was appointed Chief Constable of the new force.

Inch's success in combining the three forces into the combined force led him to be appointed in 1955, at the age of 44, as Chief Constable of Edinburgh City Police.

As Chief Constable of Edinburgh, Inch was a member of the organising committee for the Commonwealth Games held in the city in 1970. A keen sportsman, Inch also served as chairman of the Police Athletic Association from 1971 to 1975.

In 1975, Edinburgh City Police amalgamated with Berwick, Roxburgh, Selkirk and Lothian and Peebles Constabularies to form Lothian and Borders Police, and Inch served as Chief Constable of the new force until his retirement in 1976.

Inch was appointed Commander of the Order of the British Empire (CBE) in 1958 and Commander of the Royal Victorian Order (CVO) in 1969, and was knighted in 1972.

He died in Edinburgh on 22 November 1993.
