= Robert T Beaty =

Scottish engineer

Professor Robert T Beaty OBE FREng FIEE, FIProdE, engineer, is a former chairman of Renfrewshire Enterprise, Chairman of the Court of the University of Paisley and the University of the West of Scotland, and member of the Scottish Industrial Development Advisory Board.

Robert Thompson Beaty was born in 1943 and received his schooling at Hamilton Academy before entering the University of Glasgow at which he was Hoover scholar, BSc.

Following further training in engineering with the Hoover Company at Cambuslang, Scotland, Beaty has held numerous positions including those with IBM, of which he was a director (IBM, Greenock, Scotland, 1994–96), the Scottish Electronics Forum (chief executive 1996-97) and Semple Cochrane plc (non-executive director, 1996–99.) From 1996 Beaty has been visiting professor of product design at the University of Glasgow.

In 1995 he was invited to deliver the MacMillan Memorial Lecture to the Institution of Engineers and Shipbuilders in Scotland. He chose the subject "The Growth of Information Technology".

In 1999, Robert Beaty was appointed chairman of Renfrewshire Enterprise, part of the Scottish Enterprise network, a position he held to 2003 in which year he was awarded the OBE for services to enterprise.

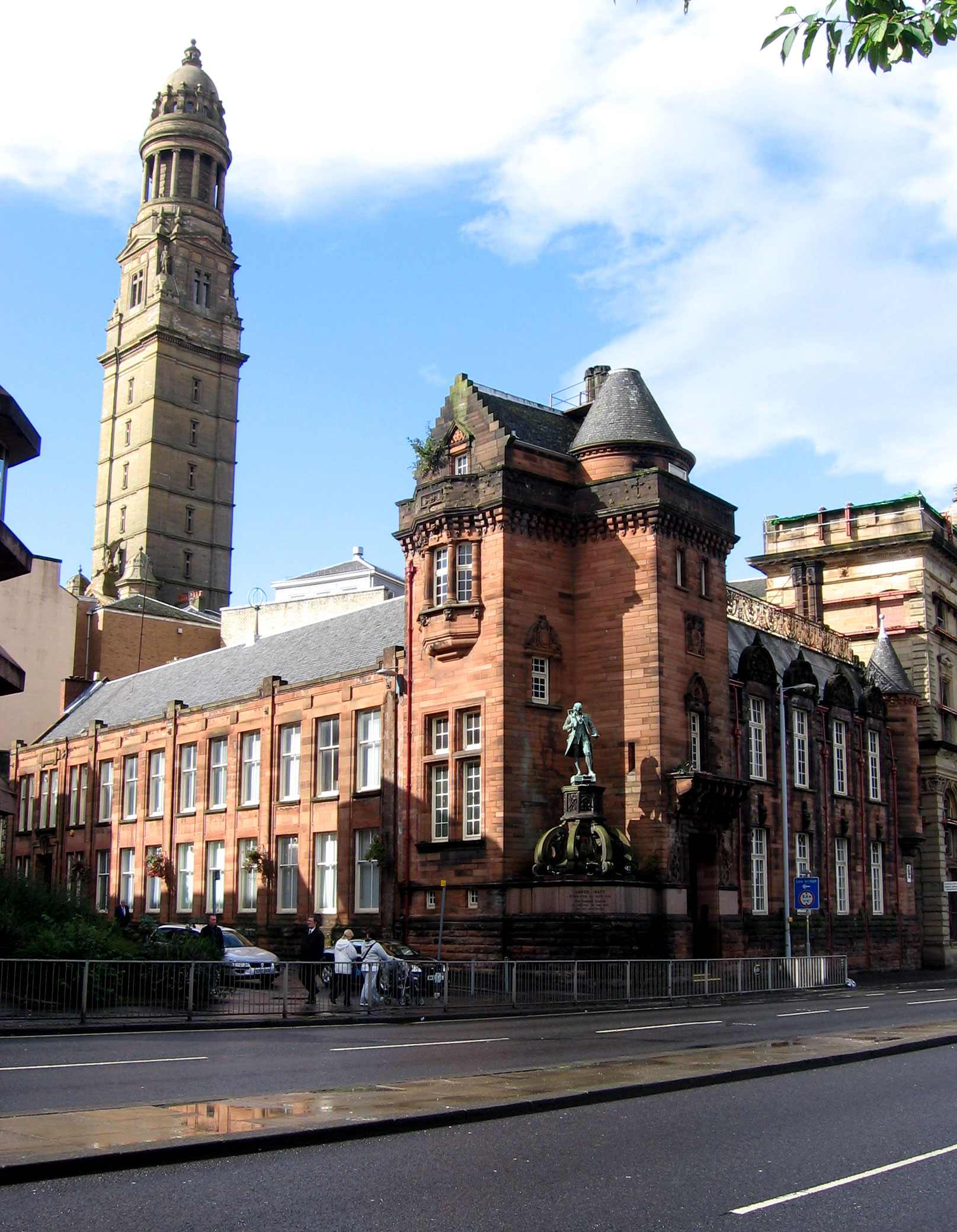
James Watt Memorial College, Greenock, Scotland

Beaty has also served as a member of the board of the Scottish Institute for Enterprise (2002–05) and of the Engineering Education Scheme for Scotland in addition to being a member of the court of the University of Paisley (merging with Bell College in 2007 to become the University of the West of Scotland) since 1999, and chairman 2006–10, and from 2000 a member of the management committee of James Watt College, and vice-chair 2005–07. In 2003 Beaty was also appointed to the Scottish Industrial Development Board.

In 1985 Robert Beaty was elected a Fellow of the Institution of Electrical Engineers (now merged to become in 2006 the Institution of Engineering and Technology) and in 1989 a Fellow of the Royal Academy of Engineering.
