= John Duncan Lowe =

The Honourable Sheriff Lowe

Sheriff of Glasgow and Strathkelvin
- In office 1997–1998

Personal details
- Born: John Duncan Lowe; 18 May 1948 Alloa, Scotland
- Died: 7 September 1998 Edinburgh, Scotland
- Education: University of Glasgow
- Profession: Lawyer

John Duncan Lowe CB (18 May 1948 – 7 September 1998) was a Scottish lawyer, Crown Agent for Scotland and Sheriff of Glasgow and Strathkelvin.

Lowe was born at Alloa, Clackmannanshire, Scotland, in 1948 and received his education at Hamilton Academy and the University of Glasgow, graduating MA, LLB.

Following an apprenticeship with a firm of solicitors and a short period in local government, in 1974 Lowe joined the Procurator Fiscal Service and worked in Procurator Fiscal offices at Kilmarnock, Glasgow and at Edinburgh. Lowe was subsequently appointed Deputy Crown Agent for Scotland (1984–86) and in 1988 took up the post of Regional Procurator Fiscal at Edinburgh, a position he held till 1991.

At the early age of 42, in 1991 Lowe was appointed Crown Agent for Scotland and in 1995 was invested CB, (Companion of the Order of the Bath.) In 1997 Lowe was appointed Sheriff of Glasgow and Strathkelvin, a position he held until his death at Edinburgh the following year.
