= Thomas Laurie =

Scottish surveyor and supporter of the Arts

Thomas Laurie OBE FRICS (11 November 1938 – 23 December 2020) was Chairman of the Traverse Theatre, Chairman of WASPS Trust (Workshop and Artists' Studio Provision Scotland) and Trustee, Scottish Civic Trust. Laurie trained as a chartered surveyor and became a partner in the firm of Robert H. Soper & Co. of Cumbernauld before setting up his own firm, Thomas Laurie Associates of Cumbernauld and Glasgow, in 1977.

== Appointments, the theatre and the arts ==
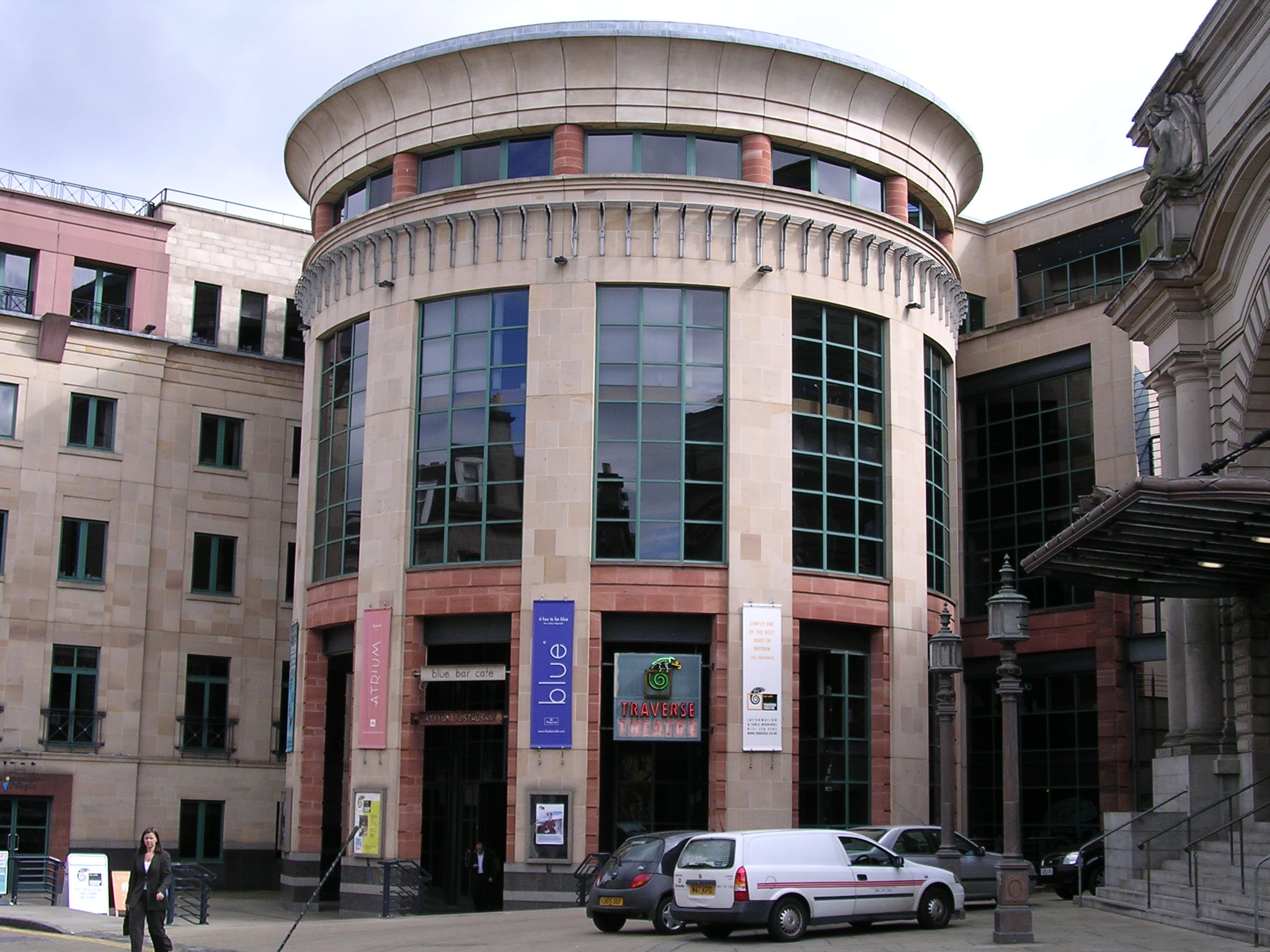
Traverse Theatre, Edinburgh

After meeting Robert Soper in 1962, theatre became a significant part of Laurie's life, which contributed to Glasgow's cultural growth. In 1961, Thomas Laurie became a founder member of the Cumbernauld Theatre Group and from 1964–72 served as a board member at the Cottage Theatre, Cumbernauld. A board member and former Chairman of the Traverse Theatre (1972–76), Laurie is also a past Chairman and Trustee of WASPS Trust (Workshop and Artists' Studio Provision Scotland) and a former member of the Drama Panel, Scottish Arts Council (1973–82) and of the Scottish Arts Council (1976–82). He is also a former Trustee of the Scottish Civic Trust and a Fellow of the Royal Institution of Chartered Surveyors.

== Personal life ==
Thomas Laurie was born in Wishaw on 11 November 1938.

He died on 23 December 2020.
