= Mary Nicol Neill Armour =

Scottish artist (1902–2000)

- Born: Mary Nicol Neill Steel; 27 March 1902; Blantyre, South Lanarkshire, Scotland
- Died: 5 July 2000 (aged 98); Paisley, Renfrewshire
- Education: Glasgow School of Art
- Known for: Painting
- Awards: Guthrie Award, 1937

Mary Nicol Neill Armour LLD, née Steel, (27 March 1902 – 5 July 2000) was a Scottish landscape and still life painter, art teacher and an Honorary President of the Glasgow School of Art and the Royal Glasgow Institute of the Fine Arts.

== Biography ==
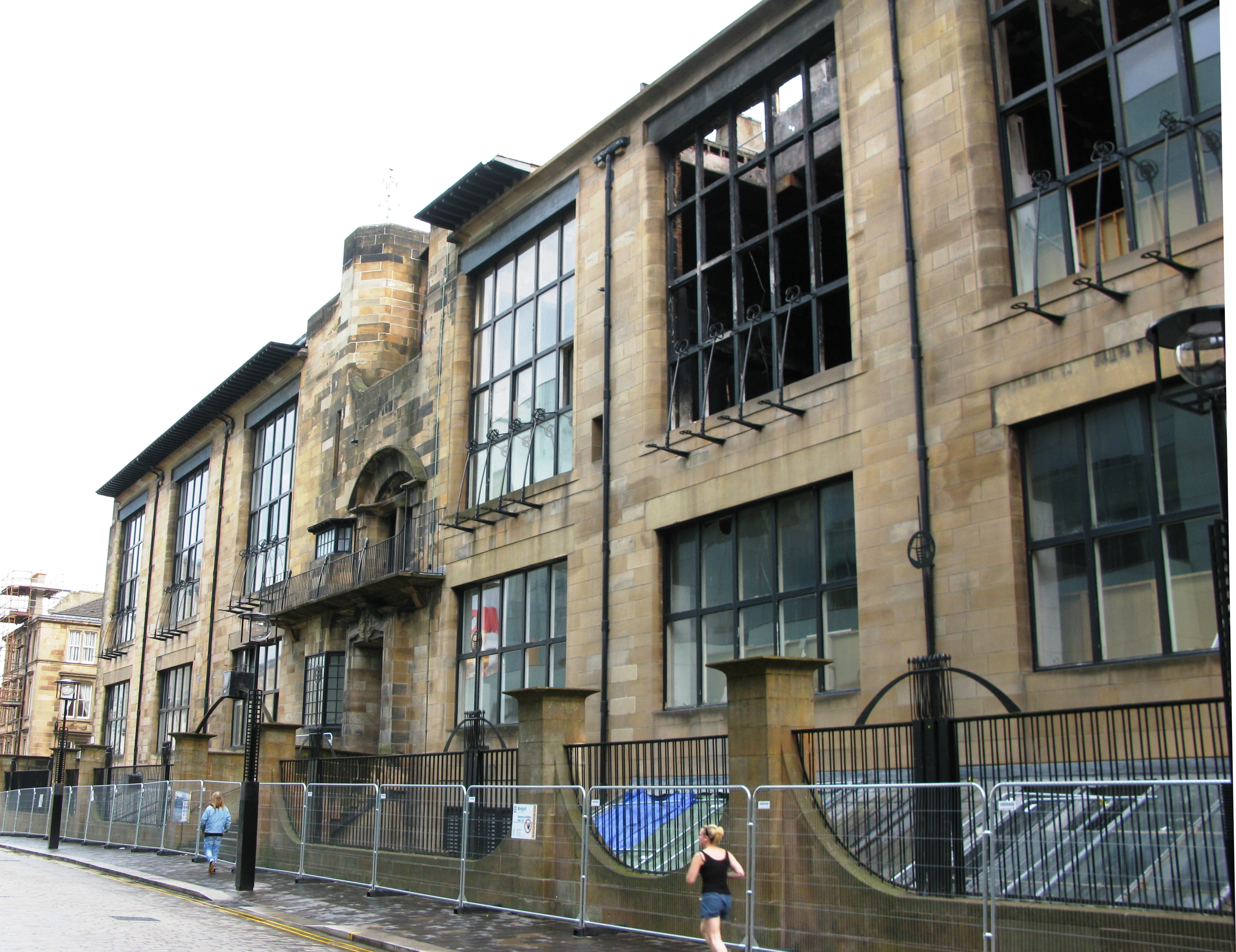
Glasgow School of Art

Mary Nicol Steel was born on 27 March 1902 at Blantyre, Scotland to Jabina Gilbert and William Steel, a steel worker. She was the eldest of six children. As a young girl she initially wanted to train to become a teacher. She won a scholarship to Hamilton Academy and attended between 1914 and 1920. She drew the attention of an art teacher, Penelope Beaton (1886–1963), who was later to become Head of the Junior Department, Edinburgh School of Art. Beaton became a role model for the young Mary and she persuaded her Armour's father to allow her to enrol at Glasgow School of Art, where she studied from 1920 until 1925.

After a post-diploma year and teacher training, Armour became an art teacher working in Glasgow and Cambuslang. In 1927 she married the landscape and figure painter William Armour (1903–1979), settling in Milngavie on the outskirts of Glasgow city. Her marriage resulted in her resigning her teaching post as required under the education authority rules for married women. While this meant she had more time to paint, it went entirely against her preference.

She and her husband founded the Milngavie Art Club in 1927.

Armour exhibited regularly at the Royal Academy in London; the Royal Scottish Academy in Edinburgh and winning the Guthrie Prize in 1937; the Royal Society of Painters in Watercolour, the Scottish Society of Artists and the Royal Glasgow Institute of the Fine Arts. In 1941, she was elected an associate of the Royal Scottish Watercolour Society, becoming a full member in 1956. She became a member of the Royal Scottish Academy in 1958. After the Education Authority legislation for married women had been repealed, Armour returned to teaching still life painting at Glasgow School of Art from 1951 to 1962. Initially many of her students were returning servicemen who had had their training at the School interrupted by the war. Their interest and enthusiasm for modern European art influenced her, bringing more colour and fluidity to her work.

She retired from teaching in 1962 and returned to painting full-time. This allowed a late flourish in her career and her work was in considerable demand. In 1972 she was awarded the Cargill Prize from the Royal Glasgow Institute of the Fine Arts and became a full member of the Institute in 1977. In 1982 she was awarded an honorary LLD from the University of Glasgow. She was also elected Honorary President of both Glasgow School of Art and Royal Glasgow Institute of the Fine Arts.

The Armour Award, named after her, is awarded annually by The Royal Glasgow Institute of the Fine Arts for a work of distinction by a young artist.

Armour continued to paint until 1988 when her eyesight worsened. She died in Paisley on 5 July 2000.

== Artwork ==
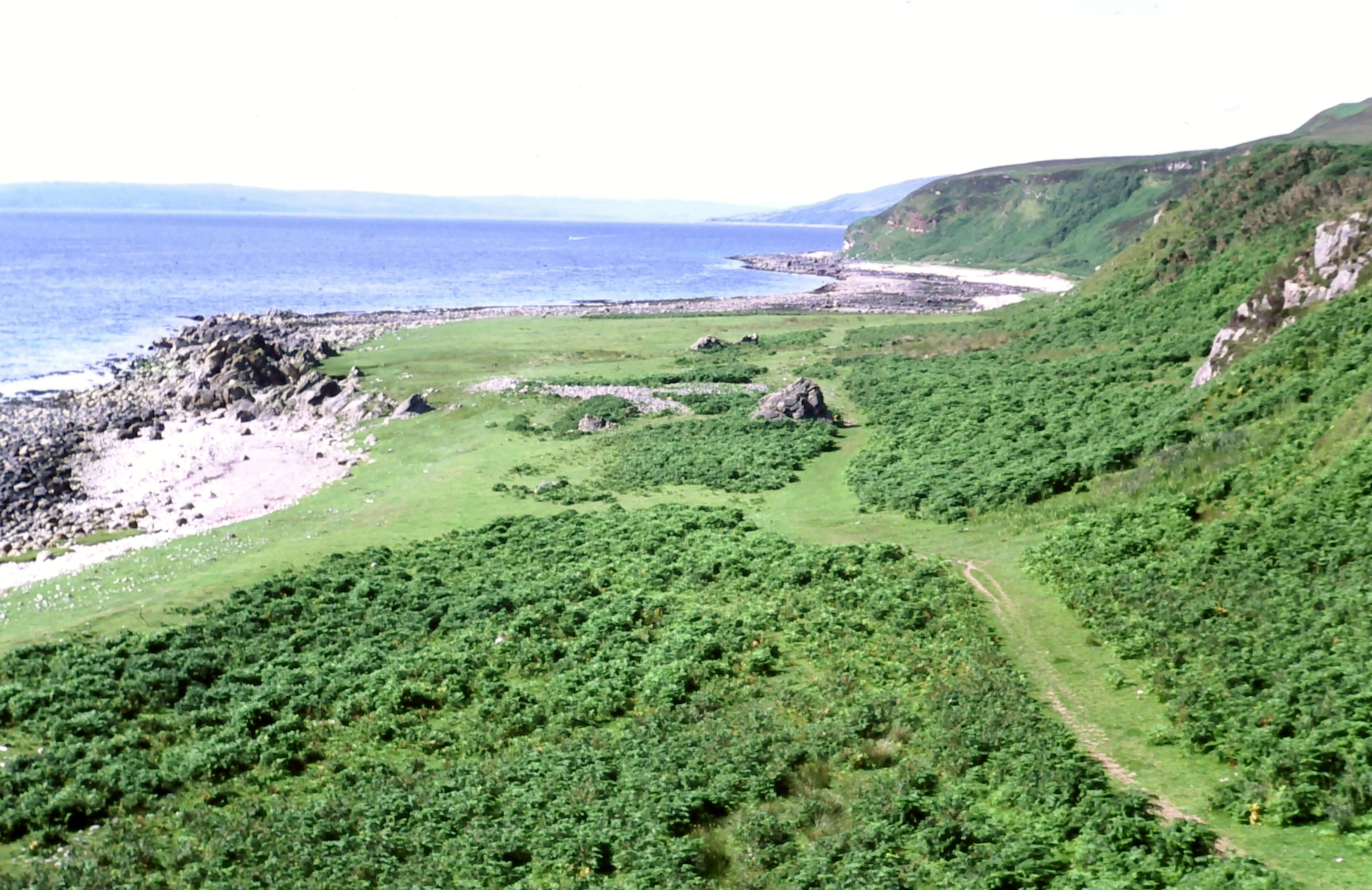
Blackwaterfoot, the seaside village where Armour and her husband painted.

During her training at the Glasgow School of Art from 1920 to 1924, Armour learned a sophisticated respect for strong composition, though her independence can be seen in her decision to paint a 'Pit Head Scene' for her diploma project rather than the expected religious subject painting and against the wishes of her tutor, Maurice Greiffenhagen. Her still life paintings with flowers - even though she also painted still life without flowers, as well as landscapes, seascapes and some portraits - are her most characteristic works. Armour learned from her contemporaries such as Anne Redpath and her close friend David Donaldson, and Still Life with Pomegranate is a fine example of her paintings of the late 1940s. During Armour's teaching at the Glasgow School of Art in the 1950s, she claimed to have learnt much from her students and their response to contemporary painting. As a result, her brushwork became freer and her colour brightened and became more vibrant. Armour and her husband often painted the sea at Blackwaterfoot on the Isle of Arran, and it was for these seascapes that she later told a friend that she would like to be remembered.
