= Laura Duncan (sheriff) =

The Honourable Sheriff Laura Duncan

Sheriff of Glasgow and Strathkelvin
- In office 1982–2006

Personal details
- Education: University of Glasgow
- Profession: Advocate

Laura Duncan, advocate and Sheriff of Glasgow and Strathkelvin.

A Sheriff at Glasgow Sheriff Court, reputed to be the busiest court in Europe, Laura Duncan was born on 17 June 1947 and educated at the Hamilton Academy and the University of Glasgow. Qualifying as a solicitor in 1969 she was two years in private practice before joining the Procurator Fiscal Service.

Deciding to become an Advocate, Duncan was admitted to the bar in 1976. In 1982 she was appointed a floating sheriff and the following year this made a permanent appointment. In 2002 Sheriff Duncan made a landmark court ruling, deciding that a homosexual man who had acted as a sperm donor for a lesbian couple had the same rights as a heterosexual father. Sheriff Duncan retired from the bench in 2006.

A keen sailor, Laura Duncan won the Scottish ladies' single-handed dinghy championships in 1990.
