= Visual Arts Scotland =

Artist group based in Edinburgh, Scotland

Visual Arts Scotland (VAS) is an exhibiting art organisation based in Edinburgh, Scotland representing fine and applied visual artists throughout the country. The society was founded in 1924 as the Scottish Society of Women Artists.

Visual Arts Scotland is a multi-disciplinary body that includes painters, textile artists, sculptors, ceramicists and photographers. It holds an annual exhibition at the Royal Scottish Academy building. It is a registered charity (No. SC006715)

== History ==
In 1924, William McDougall founded the Scottish Society of Women Artists due to the fact that his daughter, Lily McDougall, was a talented painter and could not be recognised simply because she was a woman. In the early 20th century, women didn't have the ability to gain acknowledgment for their artistic skills because it was male dominant. William McDougall created this organisation to give women the opportunity to expand their artistic horizons and to encourage them to continue with their artistic ventures. This organisation lasted until the late 1980s when it was renamed as the Scottish Artists and Artist Craftsmen and admitted men for the first time. Alison Dunlop RSW was President of the Society in 1997-99, when it was re-named Visual Arts Scotland. This organisation has various and diverse artists from across the country as its members In recent years VAS have had Diana Hope, Robbie Bushe, Andrew Mackenzie and Sarah Calmus in President role.

== Notable members ==
- Louise Gibson Annand, twice President of the Scottish Society of Women Artists (1963–6 and 1980–5)
- Alison Kinnaird
- Anne Redpath, President of the Scottish Society of Women Artists (1944-7)

== See also ==
- Scottish art
- Women artists
- Glasgow Society of Lady Artists
- Royal Scottish Academy
- Royal Scottish Society of Painters in Watercolour
- Society of Scottish Artists
