= List of people educated at Hamilton Academy =

Listed in alphabetical order by surname, notable former pupils of the former Hamilton Academy school, Scotland, United Kingdom. (Last intake of pupils to Hamilton Academy, 1971.)

== A ==
- John Anderson, writer, activist and Challis Professor of Philosophy at the University of Sydney; brother of Professor William Anderson, another notable alumnus of Hamilton Academy.
- James Craig Annan, pioneering photographer; Honorary Fellow of the Royal Photographic Society
- Louise Gibson Annand (MacFarquhar), painter; film-maker; member of the Royal Fine Art Commission for Scotland; President of the Society of Scottish Women Artists; chairperson of the J. D. Fergusson Foundation
- Walter J D Annand, aeronautical research engineer; academic and author
- Mary Nicol Neill Armour, artist; Fellow, Royal Scottish Academy; Hon. President, Glasgow School of Art; Hon. President, Royal Glasgow Institute of the Fine Arts; Fellow, the Royal Scottish Society of Painters in Watercolour
- Ernest Macalpine (Mac) Armstrong; former Chief Medical Officer for Scotland; Fellow, Royal College of Surgeons of Edinburgh; Fellow, Royal College of Physicians and Surgeons of Glasgow; Fellow, Royal College of Physicians of Edinburgh; Fellow, Royal College of General Practitioners; Fellow, the Faculty of Public Health; former Secretary to the British Medical Association
- Frederick Stanley Arnot, missionary, explorer of Central Africa; author; friend of Dr. David Livingstone's family; Fellow, Royal Geographical Society
- Struther Arnott, molecular biologist; Fellow, the Royal Society; Fellow, the Royal Society of Edinburgh; Fellow, King's College London; Fellow, Institute of Biology (becoming the Society of Biology); Fellow, the Royal Society of Chemistry; Principal and Vice-Chancellor, University of St. Andrews; Gold Medallist for General Scholarship and Silver Medallist in Chemistry and in Mathematics, Hamilton Academy, 1952; 1st. science place awardee, Open Bursary Competition 1952, University of Glasgow (from Hamilton Academy)

== B ==
- Matthew Baillie, physician, pathologist and writer. Fellow 1790, 'Elect' 1809, of the Royal College of Physicians London; Hon Fellow, 1809, of the Royal College of Physicians of Edinburgh and Fellow, the Royal Society
- Alastair Balls, senior economic adviser to the Treasury; Departments of Environment and Transport, Undersecretary; Chairman, International Centre for Life; former member of the board of the Independent Television Commission; Chairman, Alzheimer's Society; board member, Higher Education Funding Council for England; Chairman, Northern Rock Foundation
- Robert Thompson Beaty, engineer, Chair of the Court of the University of Paisley, visiting professor of product design, University of Glasgow, Fellow of the Royal Academy of Engineering, Fellow of the Institution of Electrical Engineers, FIProdE
- Robert J. T. Bell, mathematician and author; Fellow, Royal Society of Edinburgh; Professor of Pure and Applied Mathematics and Dean of the Faculty of Arts and Science, University of Otago, New Zealand
- Archie Bethel, Chief Executive, Babcock International Group Plc; Fellow, the Royal Society of Edinburgh; Fellow, Royal Academy of Engineering; past vice-President, Institution of Mechanical Engineers; past-President, Scottish Engineering
- David King Murray, Lord Birnam, a judicial title of Sir David King Murray as a Senator of the College of Justice, Scotland
- Major John White Bone, consultant general surgeon. During the Second World War served with the Royal Army Medical Corps in France, evacuated from Dunkirk, returned in the Normandy landings, between times commander of military hospital in Jamaica and seconded to the Johns Hopkins Hospital, Baltimore, U.S.
- Craig Brown, footballer, former manager of the Scotland national football team; and manager of Aberdeen F.C.
- Jock Brown, football commentator; former General Manager, Celtic F.C.
- William Brown, architect; Fellow, the Royal Institute of British Architects; partner in the firm of Cullen, Lochhead and Brown, architects of the 'new' Hamilton Academy building, opened in 1913, and other major buildings
- Sir Andrew Bryan, mining engineer and author; Fellow, the Royal Society of Edinburgh; H.M. Inspector of Mines; The Sir Andrew Bryan Medal awarded by the Institute of Materials, Minerals and Mining
- John Cameron Bryce, first Bradley Professor of English Literature and Emeritus Professor, University of Glasgow; editor, The Glasgow Edition of the Works and Correspondence of Adam Smith; bequeather of The Alexander & Dixon Scholarship (Bryce Bequest) at the University of Glasgow

== C ==
- Sir Alexander Cairncross, economist; Master, St Peter's College, Oxford; Chancellor, University of Glasgow; Fellow, The British Academy; Hon. Fellow, the Royal Society of Edinburgh; first Director of the Economic Development Institute founded by the World Bank; President of the Royal Economic Society
- John Cairncross, former Hamilton Academy Dux medallist, linguist, author, one of the KGB's Cambridge Five ('Ring of Five'), brother of Sir Alexander Cairncross
- Robert Russell Calder, author, editor and critic; formerly editor with Chapman Publishing, Scotland
- Archibald Y. Campbell, classical scholar, published poet and author of emendations of classical texts; (graduate and) Fellow, St John's College, Cambridge; Gladstone Professor of Greek, University of Liverpool
- Sir George Campbell MP, banker; director, P&O; Lieutenant-Governor of Bengal, India
- Sir Matthew Campbell KBE CB, Secretary, Department of Agriculture and Fisheries, Scotland
- Madge Carruthers, President of the Scottish Women's Amateur Athletic Association; manager Scottish women's athletic team, Commonwealth Games, Christchurch, New Zealand, 1974
- James Cassels, son of Provost Andrew Cassels of Hamilton
- Thomas Cassells MP; Sheriff-substitute of Inverness, Elgin and Nairn; Dean of Guild for the Burgh of Falkirk; McFarlane Scholar in Law, University of Glasgow
- Bob Cleland, Chief Executive of the multi-national, the Howden Group
- Sir Ken Collins former MEP; Fellow, the Royal Scottish Geographical Society; Honorary Fellow of the Chartered Institution of Water and Environmental Management, and the Chartered Institution of Wastes Management; past-Chairman of the committee on the Environment, Public Health and Consumer Protection at the European Parliament; past-Chairman of the Scottish Environment Protection Agency (SEPA)
- David Colville Jr., steel magnate, David Colville & Sons, Dalzell works, Motherwell. Largest steel producing plant in Scotland and record output for Great Britain (1901). Uncle of John Colville, 1st Baron Clydesmuir, Viceroy and Governor-General of India
- Squadron Leader Denis Richard Colvin, Inspector of Lighting, Glasgow; President and Honorary Fellow of the Institution of Lighting Engineers
- Robert Craig Connal QC, appointed Scotland's first Solicitor Advocate QC (2002); former Council Member, Royal Faculty of Procurators in Glasgow; Convenor, the Law Society of Scotland Supreme Courts Training Course (Civil)
- Sheriff Principal Graham Cox QC, former Sheriff of Tayside, Central and Fife and Sheriff principal of South Strathclyde, Dumfries and Galloway, in whose Scottish court at Kamp Van Zeist, The Netherlands, the suspects arrested regarding the Lockerbie air disaster first appeared on 6 April 1999
- Thomas Rae Craig, director, British Steel Corporation; former President of the Iron and Steel Institute and chairman of the Hunterston Development Company
- John McKinnon Crawford DA, painter
- John M. Crawford, Fellow of the Royal Institute of British Architects; the first architect to be elected President of Glasgow Art Club (1903)
- Robert N. Cross, Principal, Manchester College, University of Oxford (Harris Manchester College, Oxford)
- Colonel Alexander Cullen, Commander 6th. Battalion of the Cameronian Regiment; Fellow, the Surveyors' Institution; Fellow, the Society of Antiquaries of Scotland; President (1951–53), the Royal Incorporation of Architects in Scotland; Fellow, Royal Institute of British Architects; governor of the Royal College of Art and of Glasgow School of Art. Son of Alexander Cullen Snr., of Cullen, Lochhead and Brown, architects, the 'new' Hamilton Academy building (completed 1913.)
- William Cullen, chemist, Professor of Chemistry and Medicine, University of Edinburgh; Fellow, the Royal Society; a founding member of the Royal Society of Edinburgh and the Royal Medical Society; President of the Glasgow Faculty of Physicians and Surgeons (becoming in 1962, the Royal College of Physicians and Surgeons of Glasgow)
- John E. Cunningham, first Principal, Bathgate Technical College; former Head of Engineering, David Dale Technical College, Glasgow

== D ==
- Ian Deary, psychologist and author; Director, Medical Research Council (UK) Centre for Cognitive Ageing and Cognitive Epidemiology, University of Edinburgh; Fellow, Royal College of Physicians of Edinburgh; Fellow, Royal Society of Edinburgh; Fellow, British Academy; Fellow, Academy of Medical Sciences; Fellow, Royal College of Psychiatrists; Associate Fellow, British Psychological Society; Founder-Member of the International Society for Intelligence Research
- James Stedman Dixon, President of the Mining Institute of Scotland and President of the Institution of Mining Engineers of Great Britain; member of the Royal Commission on Coal Supplies; founder (1907) of the Chair in Mining Engineering (now the James S. Dixon Chair of Applied Geology) University of Glasgow; endowed the Dr. James S. Dixon Bursary in Mining Engineering for pupils of technical subjects at Hamilton Academy
- Squadron Leader Dr. William John Atkinson Dobson, Medical Officer to the National Coal Board
- Dougie Donnelly, television and radio presenter
- Colin Douglas, novelist. Pseudonym of Dr. Colin Currie, lecturer and consultant in geriatric medicine. Trustee of the Institute of Medical Ethics
- Laura Duncan, Sheriff of Glasgow and Strathkelvin, Scotland
- Captain James Churchill Dunn, doctor and author of the book, The War the Infantry Knew, 1914–1919

== F ==
- W Kenneth Fee, former sub-Editor, Glasgow Herald; (past Editor) and Director, The Scots Independent; former President of the National Union of Students Scotland
- Ian Ford, professor and Director, Robertson Centre for Biostatistics and former Dean, Faculty of Information and Mathematical Sciences, University of Glasgow; Fellow, Royal Society of Edinburgh; Fellow, Royal College of Physicians and Surgeons of Glasgow; Member of the American Statistical Association and the Royal Statistical Society
- John Samuel Forrest, physicist, electrical engineer; professor emeritus University of Strathclyde, Fellow, the Royal Society, Fellow, Royal Meteorological Society, Fellow, Institution of Engineering and Technology, a Dux, Mathematics and Science medalist, Hamilton Academy (1925)
- Robert Forrest, architect and contractor; builder of important buildings in New Zealand, including Dunedin University (University of Otago)
- Sir Charles Annand Fraser, former Chairman, Lothian & Edinburgh Enterprise and of Adam and Company PLC; former director, British Assets Trust PLC, Scottish Television PLC, Scottish Business in the Community, Stakis PLC; former Council Member, Law Society of Scotland, and Trustee World Wildlife Fund (UK)
- Andrew Froude, Registrar General for Scotland (appointed 1930)
- William Wright Fulton, physician; Fellow, Royal College of General Practitioners; former Chair, Area Medical Committee, Glasgow

== G ==
- Malcolm Gavin, physicist, engineer and pioneer of radar; Professor of Electronic Engineering Science, University College of North Wales; Principal of Chelsea College of Science and Technology (now King's College, London)
- Robert Gibson, Lord Gibson MP, Senator of the College of Justice, Scotland, and as Chairman of the Scottish Land Court succeeding another Hamilton Academy former pupil, Lord Murray
- Douglas Alston Gilchrist, agriculturalist and academic; Fellow, the Royal Society of Edinburgh (1900)
- Marion Gilchrist, the first woman to graduate from the University of Glasgow and the first woman to qualify in medicine from a Scottish university (1894 University of Glasgow); one of the founders (1902) of the Glasgow and West of Scotland Association for Women's Suffrage; and President of the Glasgow and West Scotland Association of the Medical Women's Federation
- Robert Glen, prison Governor
- Alex Graham, independent television programme producer whose company has won Oscar (Academy Award), Emmy, BAFTA and Peabody Awards; Fellow of the Royal Television Society; Fellow Royal Society of Arts; visiting Fellow, University of Bournemouth Media School

== H ==
- Brigadier Thomas Haddon, Chief of Staff, Hong Kong Land Forces; raised the Singapore Armed Forces; aide-de-camp to H.M. Queen Elizabeth II; Assistant Secretary of the Joint Intelligence Sub-Committee of the War Cabinet; Commanding Officer, 1st battalion, Border Regiment
- Alexander Hamilton, former Vice-Chairman, Royal Bank of Scotland and past-President, the Law Society of Scotland
- Alexander H. Harley, Principal, Madrasah College, Calcutta, India (now Aliah University)
- John C. E. Hay; Sheriff of Glasgow
- David Willis Wilson Henderson, microbiologist; Fellow, the Royal Society; President of the Society for General Microbiology; awarded the U.S. Presidential Medal of Freedom, 1946
- Henry Herron, Procurator-Fiscal for Glasgow
- Major General J. R. Holden CBE DSO, Chief of the British Military Mission to the Soviet Zone of Germany; General Officer Commanding 43rd (Wessex) Infantry Division; Director, Royal Armoured Corps
- Detective Chief Superintendent Ian Hosie, Joint head of Strathclyde Police CID; Director of the Scottish Criminal Record Office (SCRO)
- John Whiteford Hutson, diplomat; former Counsellor, Head of the Communications Operations Department, Foreign and Commonwealth Office and Consul General

== I ==
- Sir John Inch, chief constable Dunfermline City Police (1943–49), Fife Police (1949–55) and Edinburgh City Police (1955–76)
- Colonel Thomas Alexander Irvine, Commanding Officer, 7th Battalion Worcestershire Regiment; Deputy Lieutenant of Lanark to H.M. King George VI (appointed December 1950)
- John Irving, Chair of Theoretical Physics, University of Cape Town
- David Irwin, clinical psychiatrist; a Founder Fellow of the Royal College of Psychiatrists

== J ==
- Robert Jack, mathematician, physicist and pioneer of radio broadcasting, New Zealand; Dean of the Faculty of Arts and Science, University of Otago, New Zealand
- Robin Jenkins, novelist; awarded the Saltire Society Lifetime Achievement Award 2003; portrait, by Jennifer McRae, in the collection of the National Portrait Gallery of Scotland
- William Johnstone, former Dean of the Faculty of Divinity, and Emeritus Professor of Hebrew and Semitic Languages, University of Aberdeen; President, Society for Old Testament Study

== K ==
- James Keith, Baron Keith of Avonholm, Privy Counsellor; Senator of the College of Justice, Scotland; King's Counsel
- Duncan Livingston Kerr, physician; honorary colonel of the 51st (Highland) Infantry Division RAMC.; Deputy Lieutenant of the County of Lanark to HM King George VI and HM Queen Elizabeth II
- W. H. Kerr, one of the Founders, and Fellow of the Royal College of General Practitioners
- John Knox, consultant physician; clinical senior lecturer in medicine, University of Aberdeen; Fellow, Royal College of Physicians, London; Fellow, Royal College of Physicians and Surgeons of Glasgow; Fellow, Royal College of Physicians of Edinburgh

== L ==
- Sir Robert Hamilton Lang, financier; director of the Imperial Ottoman Bank; H.M. Brittanic Consul in Cyprus; collector of antiquities, parts of his collection in the British Museum, the Louvre and donated to Glasgow Art Gallery and Museum at Kelvingrove. Uncle of Cosmo Gordon Lang, Archbishop of Canterbury, 1928–1942.
- Sir Andrew Gibson Latta, shipping line owner, director of Lawther, Latta & Co. Ltd., London; knighted (1921) for services to Ministry of Shipping, war effort, World War I. Brother of Sir John Latta, Bt.
- Thomas Laurie, former board member and Chairman, Traverse Theatre; past Chairman, and Trustee WASPS Trust (Workshop and Artists' Studio Provision Scotland); Trustee, Scottish Civic Trust; former member of the Drama Panel, Scottish Arts Council; Fellow of the Royal Institution of Chartered Surveyors
- John Leggate, former Chief Information Officer, BP; Fellow of the Institution of Electrical Engineers; Fellow of the Royal Academy of Engineering
- David Leslie, international rugby union referee
- David Alexander Liddell, chemist; expert on explosives and propellents; Managing Chemist, Royal Ordnance Factory
- Gilbert Little, Fellow, Institution of Civil Engineers; President of the Institution of Water Engineers
- Ian Lang Livingstone, former Chairman, Motherwell College; former Chairman Motherwell Football Club and Governor, David Livingstone Memorial Trust
- Lieutenant-Colonel Donald Kenneth Lennox, consultant surgeon; senior medical army officer in Hiroshima after bombing
- John Duncan Lowe, Sheriff of Glasgow and Strathkelvin; Crown Agent for Scotland

== M ==
- Douglas McBain, Olympic footballer (Olympic Games, London 1948) and lecturer, Telford College, Edinburgh
- Elsie McBroom (née MacPhail), as of 2010, possibly the oldest surviving former pupil of Hamilton Academy; a graduate of the University of Glasgow and a former teacher of mathematics, Ayr, Scotland. Aged 100, news posted by South Ayrshire Council
- Carlyle McBride McCance, former chief veterinary officer for the City of Glasgow (and former Hamilton Academy Dux)
- William McCance, artist and former controller of the celebrated Gregynog Press, Wales
- Margery Palmer McCulloch, literary scholar and author; Senior Honorary Research Fellow in Scottish Literature, University of Glasgow; former Honorary Secretary of the Saltire Society
- Margo McDonald MSP, politician
- Ian McDougall, Hamilton-born American soccer player elected into soccer Hall of Fame, U.S.; former director, chief financial officer and vice chairman of the board of the multi-national, Inco Ltd. (now Vale Limited)
- Sir Alistair MacFarlane, electrical engineer and academic; former Principal and Vice Chancellor, Heriot-Watt University and Rector, University of the Highlands and Islands Millennium Institute; Fellow and former vice-president, the Royal Society; Fellow, the Royal Society of Edinburgh; Fellow, the Royal Academy of Engineering; Fellow, former Vice-Master and Honorary Fellow, Selwyn College, Cambridge
- Major General John McGhie, President of the Ministry of Defence Army Medical Board; Director of Army Psychiatry; Honorary Physician to HM Queen Elizabeth II (appointed 1971); Fellow of the Royal College of Psychiatrists
- Edward McCombie McGirr, Muirhead professor of medicine at Glasgow Royal Infirmary; Dean of the Faculty of Medicine and Dean of Faculties, University of Glasgow; President of the Royal College of Physicians and Surgeons of Glasgow; Fellow, the Royal Society of Edinburgh; Fellow, the American College of Physicians; honorary consultant physician to the army in Scotland
- William McIlwraith, Sheriff-substitute of Lothian and Peebles
- Robert McIntyre MP; former leader of the Scottish National Party; and Provost of Stirling
- Hugh McPherson, former managing director of A.G. Barr, producers of Irn-Bru and of McVitie's part of the multi-national United Biscuits
- Alastair McWhirter, former Chief Constable of Suffolk Constabulary; Chairman, Suffolk Primary Care Trust
- Thomas J Mackie, bacteriologist, author; Dean of the Faculty of Medicine, University of Edinburgh; Wernher-Beit Chair of Bacteriology, University of Cape Town, S.A.; Member, the Royal College of Physicians of Edinburgh; Fellow, the Royal Society of Edinburgh; Corresponding Member of the Royal Academy of Medicine of Rome
- Robert Macnish; surgeon physician and author; his portrait by Daniel Maclise in the National Gallery, London
- John Millar; philosopher, historian, author and Regius Professor of Civil Law at the University of Glasgow from 1761 to 1800. The John Millar Chair of Law at the University of Glasgow was established in his memory in 1985.
- Ian Mitchell, former Lord Mayor of Exeter
- David Morrison, author, poet and painter; founder and former editor of the 'Scotia Review'
- Robert Franklin Muirhead, mathematician, writer and President of the Edinburgh Mathematical Society
- Sir David King Murray MP, (judicial titles Lord Murray and Lord Birnam), politician; judge; Solicitor General for Scotland; Senator of the College of Justice; and Chairman of the Scottish Land Court
- David King Murray, Lord Birnam, a judicial title of Sir David King Murray, as Chairman of the Scottish Land Court preceding Lord Robert Gibson, another Hamilton Academy former pupil

== N ==
- Rev. Robert Nicol, Principal, Manchester College, Oxford

== P ==
- Robert Hamilton Paterson, architect and surveyor to the Police Commissioners of the County of Lanark
- Lieutenant-Colonel Dr David Paton; medical officer with 2 Commando on the daring St Nazaire raid (sometimes referred to as 'The Greatest Raid of All') in 1942, involving HMS Campbeltown (USS Buchanan (DD-131)), the 1952 film 'The Gift Horse' starring Trevor Howard being loosely based on this raid
- Lieutenant Colonel William Patrick, General Manager, the Caledonian Railway Company
- Walter Perrie, author and Writer in Residence at the University of Stirling and University of British Columbia
- Professor William Henderson Pringle, lecturer in economics at Birkbeck College, University of London; Chair of Economics at the University of New Zealand and lecturer in economics at the London School of Economics

== R ==
- Henry Cunison Rankin, chartered accountant; lecturer and director of student education Institute of Chartered Accountants of Scotland; national Chairman of the Saltire Society; former national Treasurer, Scottish National Party
- James Gordon Reid, actor; member of the Royal Shakespeare Company
- Rev. Dr. David Syme Russell (theologian), General Secretary of the Baptist Union of Great Britain; author
- Lieutenant Colonel Dr. John Russell Grant Rice, 51st Highland Division RAMC; one of the first British officers to enter the Belsen concentration camp on its relief, 15 April 1945; deputy-Chairman, Bury and Rochdale Health Authority; magistrate

== S ==
- Thomas Alexander Scholes, Chief Executive Renfrewshire Council
- James Shepherd; professor in the study of the causes, prevention and treatment of coronary heart disease; Head of the Department of Vascular Biochemistry; Honorary Professor, Cardiovascular and Medical Sciences, University of Glasgow; Fellow, Royal Society of Edinburgh; Fellow, Academy of Medical Sciences; Fellow, Royal College of Physicians and Surgeons of Glasgow; Fellow, Royal College of Pathologists
- Thomas Sommerville, educationalist; former Rector, The High School of Montreal; Director of Education, Montreal, Canada
- Albert Stallard, Baron Stallard MP, Chief Whip and a Lord Commissioner of the Treasury in the Callaghan government
- Air Vice-Marshal William Kilpatrick Stewart, commander RAF Institute of Aviation Medicine; the Stewart Lecture at the Royal Aeronautical Society established in his honour in 1969

== T ==
- Lieutenant-Colonel Joseph Ramsay Tainsh, Director, Iraq State Railways
- Alexander Burt Taylor, former Registrar General for Scotland; Fellow, the Royal Society of Edinburgh
- Peter Dewar Thomson, founder member and Provost of the Northern Faculty of the Royal College of General Practitioners; Fellow, Royal College of General Practitioners; Fellow, Royal College of Surgeons of Edinburgh
- Samuel Thomson, chemist, author; Fellow, Royal Institute of Chemistry (becoming in 1980, the Royal Society of Chemistry); Director of Chemical Laboratories, University of Glasgow
- David Thorburn, Chief Operating Officer and Executive Director, Clydesdale Bank plc and the Yorkshire Bank; former Chairman, CBI (Confederation of British Industry) Scotland; past President of the Chartered Institute of Bankers in Scotland
- Sam Thorburn, Fellow, Royal Academy of Engineering; Former President of the Institution of Structural Engineers; Fellow, Institution of Civil Engineers; Chairman, Building Standards Advisory Committee

== W ==
- George Waddell, Registrar, High Court of Kenya
- James Bernard Walker, Chaplain, St. Andrews University; former Principal, The Queen's College, Birmingham; Awardee of the University of St Andrews University Medal, 2011
- Sir Edward Hamilton Wallace, judge, Supreme Court of Judicature at Madras, India; Snell Exhibitioner from the University of Glasgow to Balliol College, Oxford, 1893; knighted 1931
- David Warnock, veterinary surgeon, politician; Deputy Minister for Agriculture, Government of British Columbia, Canada (1919–1932)
- Alan Watson (William Alexander Jardine Watson), internationally renowned academic and author in the field of Roman law, Comparative law, legal history, and law and religion; former Lecturer at Wadham College, Oxford (1957–1959) and at Oriel College, Oxford (1959–1960) and Fellow, Oriel College, from 1960 to 1965. Appointed to the Douglas Chair of Civil Law at University of Glasgow in 1965 and appointed Professor of Civil Law at the University of Edinburgh (1968–1981). Appointed Professor of Law and Classical Studies at the University of Pennsylvania Law School in 1979, and subsequently appointed at that university Director of the Center for Advanced Studies in Legal History (1980), Nicholas F Gallichio Professor of Law (1984), and University Professor of Law in 1986. Appointed Ernest P Rogers Professor of Law at the University of Georgia in 1989. In 1997, he was elected Visiting Honorary Professor of Private Law at the University of Edinburgh. Elected a Corresponding Fellow, Royal Society of Edinburgh' in 2004. Watson has been awarded Honorary Doctorates by the universities of University of Stockholm, Glasgow, Edinburgh, University of Pretoria, University of Palermo and University of Belgrade, in addition to eight traditional degrees from the universities of Oxford, Glasgow and Edinburgh.
- Tom Watson, stage, television and film actor
- William Frame White, Consultant Orthopaedic Surgeon; Fellow, Royal College of Physicians and Surgeons of Glasgow; Fellow, Royal College of Surgeons of Edinburgh; Fellow, the British Orthopaedic Association; Council member, British Society for Surgery of the Hand
- Agnes Wilkie, film and television programmes producer, former Head of Features Scottish Television (STV), Director of Creative Industry, Northern Film and Industry, Head of International Development, TRC Media. BAFTA Scotland and BAFTA award winning television programmes and films
- Ross Wilson, Director, Scottish Enterprise Renfrewshire; Honorary Fellow, University of Glasgow; Managing Director, James Howden & Co. Ltd., marine engineers; Member, the Institute of Physics
- Captain William Scott Branks Wilson, solicitor and soldier, The Great War. His letters published posthumously, 1919, in a book called 'On Active Service', and one included in 'War Letters of Fallen Englishmen' (London 1930, Laurence Housman, editor.) (Captain Wilson, eldest son of former Provost Wilson of Motherwell, was an Hamilton Academy Dux medallist.)
- Sir Robert Wright, surgeon; President of the General Medical Council; Fellow, Royal College of Physicians; President, Royal College of Physicians and Surgeons of Glasgow; Fellow, Royal College of Surgeons of Edinburgh; Honorary Fellow, Royal Australasian College of Surgeons; Honorary Fellow, Royal College of Surgeons of England
