= Alexander Burt Taylor =

Scottish civil servant (1904–1972)

Alexander Burt Taylor, CBE, FRSE (6 June 1904 – 13 March 1972) was a Scottish civil servant and author who served as the Registrar General for Scotland.

== Life ==
Alexander Burt Taylor was born 6 June 1904 at Earlston, Berwickshire, Scotland, the son of Rev A. B. Taylor of the United Free Church of Scotland.

Following schooling at the Hamilton Academy his father moved to the Paterson United Free Church in Kirkwall on Orkney in 1919 where he witnessed the Scuttling of the German fleet at Scapa Flow. He later completed his schooling at Kirkwall Grammar School. Taylor matriculated at the University of Edinburgh and graduated MA in 1925.

He taught at schools in Stirling and Falkirk in Scotland, then at Columbia University, New York.

In 1933, he became a School Inspector for the Scottish Education Department, a branch of the Scottish Civil Service.

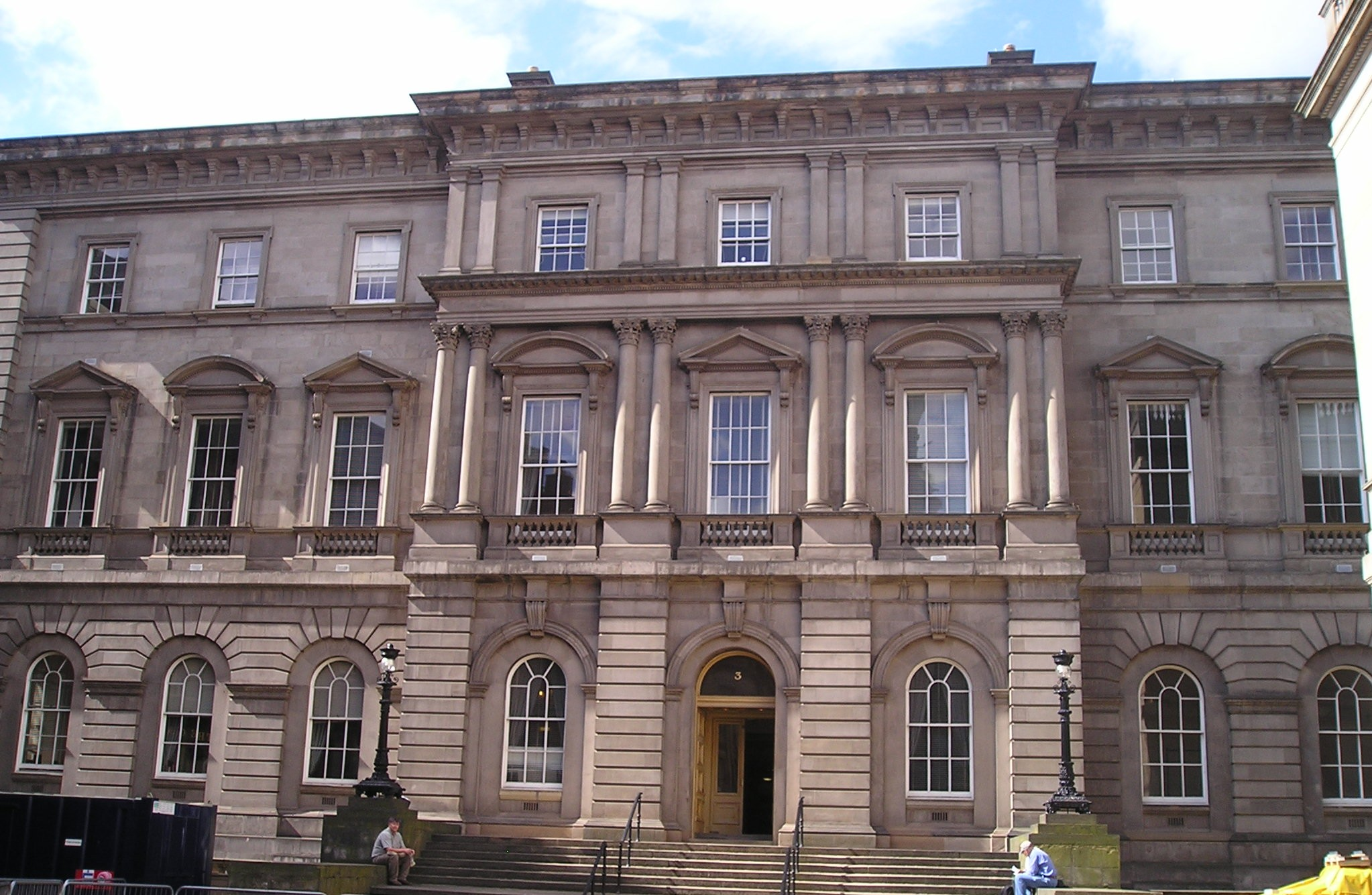
New Register House, Edinburgh, headquarters of the General Register Office for Scotland

At the beginning of World War II he was seconded to the Scottish Department of Health and in 1947 was promoted to Assistant Secretary. In 1959 Taylor was appointed Registrar-General of Births, Deaths and Marriages for Scotland, a post he held until his retirement in 1966. During his term of office he was responsible for the administration of two censuses, the Scottish full census of 1961 and the ten per cent sample in 1966.

In 1961 Taylor was invested Commander of the Order of the British Empire and elected a Fellow of the Royal Society of Edinburgh on 6 March of that year. His proposers were James Norman Davidson, John Ronald Peddie, Sir Michael Swann, Norman Feather, George Montgomery, and John McQueen Johnston.

He was succeeded in his role as Registrar General in 1955 by James Allan Ford.

He died at 35 Balgreen Road, a modest semi-detached house in western Edinburgh on 13 March 1972.

== Publications ==
Taylor was also a Scandinavian philologist and author of a translation of The Orkneying Saga: A new translation with introduction and notes (1938), and British and Irish place-names in Old Norse literature (1953). He was awarded the degree of Doctor of Letters by the University of Edinburgh. Taylor died on 13 March 1972 at the age of 67.

== Family ==
He married twice: firstly to Jean Allardyce, and, following Jean's death in 1959, he married Elizabeth.
