= Ian Ford =

Ian Ford may refer to:

- Ian Ford (statistician)
- Ian Ford (rugby union)
