= Arthur Newnham =

British soldier and cricketer (1861–1941)

Personal information
- Full name: Arthur Tristram Herbert Newnham
- Born: 17 January 1861; Dharwar, Bombay Presidency, British India
- Died: 29 December 1941 (aged 80); Wolborough, Devon, England
- Batting: Right-handed
- Bowling: Right-arm fast
- Role: Bowler
- Relatives: Lance Newnham (son)

Domestic team information
- Years: Team
- 1887–1894: Gloucestershire
- 1892/93–1898/99: Europeans
- 1892/93: Bombay

Career statistics
| Competition | First-class |
|---|---|
| Matches | 23 |
| Runs scored | 337 |
| Batting average | 10.53 |
| 100s/50s | 0/1 |
| Top score | 56 |
| Balls bowled | 2,229 |
| Wickets | 60 |
| Bowling average | 19.25 |
| 5 wickets in innings | 4 |
| 10 wickets in match | 0 |
| Best bowling | 6/64 |
| Catches/stumpings | 11/– |
- Source: CricInfo, 30 March 2014

Lieutenant-colonel Arthur Tristram Herbert Newnham (17 January 1861 – 29 December 1941) was a British soldier and cricketer. Born in British India, Newnham served in the British Army and the British Indian Army, including as a military attaché to the court of Nicholas II in Moscow. He played first-class cricket for Gloucestershire County Cricket Club between 1887 and 1894 and was considered a notable cricketer whilst serving in India.

== Early life ==
Born at Dharwar in British India in 1861, Newnham was the oldest son of William Heurtley Newnham from Clifton in Bristol. His father was serving in the Indian Civil Service at Bombay and was later a judge at Poonah. Arthur Newnham was educated at Malvern College between 1874 and 1879 where he was a school prefect, played association football, and captained the school cricket XI. (Note: Two of Newnham's brothers were also educated at Malvern. Charles (born 1863) worked as a solicitor and was wounded during World War I whilst serving with the North Lancashire Regiment. He died in 1935. Percival (born 1870) served in the British and British Indian armies. He died at the Battle of Spion Kop in 1900 during the Second Boer War after volunteering to serve with Thorneycroft's Mounted Rifles.)

== Military service ==
After leaving school, Newnham attended Royal Military College, Sandhurst, entering in 1880, and was commissioned in the West Yorkshire Regiment as a second lieutenant in 1881. He transferred to the Bombay Staff Corps in 1883, serving for the rest of his career in the British Indian Army, initially with the 10th Bombay Light Infantry. He served as a military attaché in Russia, qualified as an interpreter in Russian, and in 1889 transferred to the intelligence section of the Quartermaster General's Department. He was promoted to captain in 1892 and was an examiner in Russian for the Army. In 1901 he was promoted to major, and served in the Cantonment Magistrates department between 1893 and 1912. After being promoted to lieutenant-colonel in 1907, he retired from the Indian Army in 1913.

== Cricket ==
As a cricketer, Newnham was considered by Wisden to be a player who "would have made a big name in English cricket" if he had not been serving overseas. He played primarily as a fast bowler and took 60 wickets in 23 first-class matches including four five-wicket hauls. He made his first-class cricket debut for Gloucestershire in 1887, taking three wickets on debut against Kent at Blackheath. He played five matches for the team in each of the 1887 and 1888 seasons and appeared for the Gentlemen against the Players at The Oval in 1887 and at Lord's for the Gentlemen of England against the touring Australians the following season.

While he was in India, Newnham played regularly for Bombay Gymkhana and for services teams. Wisden considered that "for many years he was prominent in cricket abroad", and he played matches which are considered first-class for Europeans in the Bombay Presidency tournament and for Bombay against a touring team led by Lord Hawke. He made six further first-class appearances for Gloucestershire 1894 whilst in Britain.

== Family ==
Newnham married Ekaterina Federovna Yonova at St. Andrew's Anglican Church in Moscow in March 1888. (Note: The couple were also married in a Russian church.) The couple had met whilst he was serving as military attaché to the court of Nicholas II in Russia. He died at Newton Abbot Hospital in 1941 aged 80.

The couple's eldest son, Lance Newnham, was born in 1889. He served in World War I and was awarded the Military Cross. By 1941 he held the rank of acting colonel and was serving with the British Army Aid Group at Hong Kong. Following the fall of Hong Kong he was made a prisoner of war by the Japanese, held at Sham Shui Po Barracks. He was executed at Shek O Beach in December 1943 following his involvement in attempts to escape and posthumously awarded the George Cross. Another son, Eric, worked as a botanist.
