= Hector Gray =

Recipient of the George Cross

- Born: 6 June 1911; Gillingham, Kent, England
- Died: 18 December 1943 (aged 32); Sham Shui Prison Camp, Japanese-occupied Hong Kong
- Burial place: Stanley Military Cemetery
- Military career
- Allegiance: United Kingdom
- Branch: Royal Air Force
- Rank: Flight lieutenant
- Service number: 561238; 44061
- Unit: British Army Aid Group
- Conflicts: Second World War: Pacific War; Battle of Hong Kong (POW); Japanese occupation of Hong Kong (executed)
- Awards: George Cross; Air Force Medal

Hector Bertram Gray, GC, AFM (6 June 1911 – 18 December 1943) was an officer of the Royal Air Force, and a member of the British Army Aid Group, who was posthumously awarded the George Cross for "most conspicuous gallantry" in resisting torture after the Japanese occupation of Hong Kong in 1941.

== Early life ==
Gray was born on 6 June 1911 in Gillingham, Kent, the son of Lionel and Adela (née Duff) Gray, his father was a musician. Gray joined the Royal Air Force (RAF) as an aircraft apprentice at RAF Halton.

== Long distance flight ==
In November 1938 Gray, then a sergeant pilot with the RAF Long Range Development Flight, was acting as a radio operator/mechanic in one of three Vickers Wellesley bombers that flew non-stop for two days from Ismailia, Egypt, to Darwin, Australia, (7,162 mi/11,525 km) setting a world distance record. The Wellesley's record remained unbroken until November 1945 but it remains the longest by a single engined aircraft. Gray was awarded the Air Force Medal in recognition of the services he rendered to crews of the two aircraft on the long-distance record flight.

== British Army Aid Group ==
Gray smuggled medicine into the prisoner of war camp to help the many seriously ill prisoners incarcerated there and was a conduit for news from the outside world. When the Japanese grew suspicious he was tortured and interrogated for six months but refused to divulge the names of fellow officers, such as Captain Douglas Ford of the Royal Scots, and Colonel Lanceray Arthur Newnham of the Middlesex Regiment. He was executed by firing squad, with fellow prisoners, on 18 December 1943 and buried in Stanley Military Cemetery in Hong Kong. Notice of his award was published in the London Gazette on 19 April 1946.
