= Stanley Military Cemetery =

Cemetery near St. Stephen's Beach in Stanley, Hong Kong

Coordinates: 22.2135°N 114.2169°E

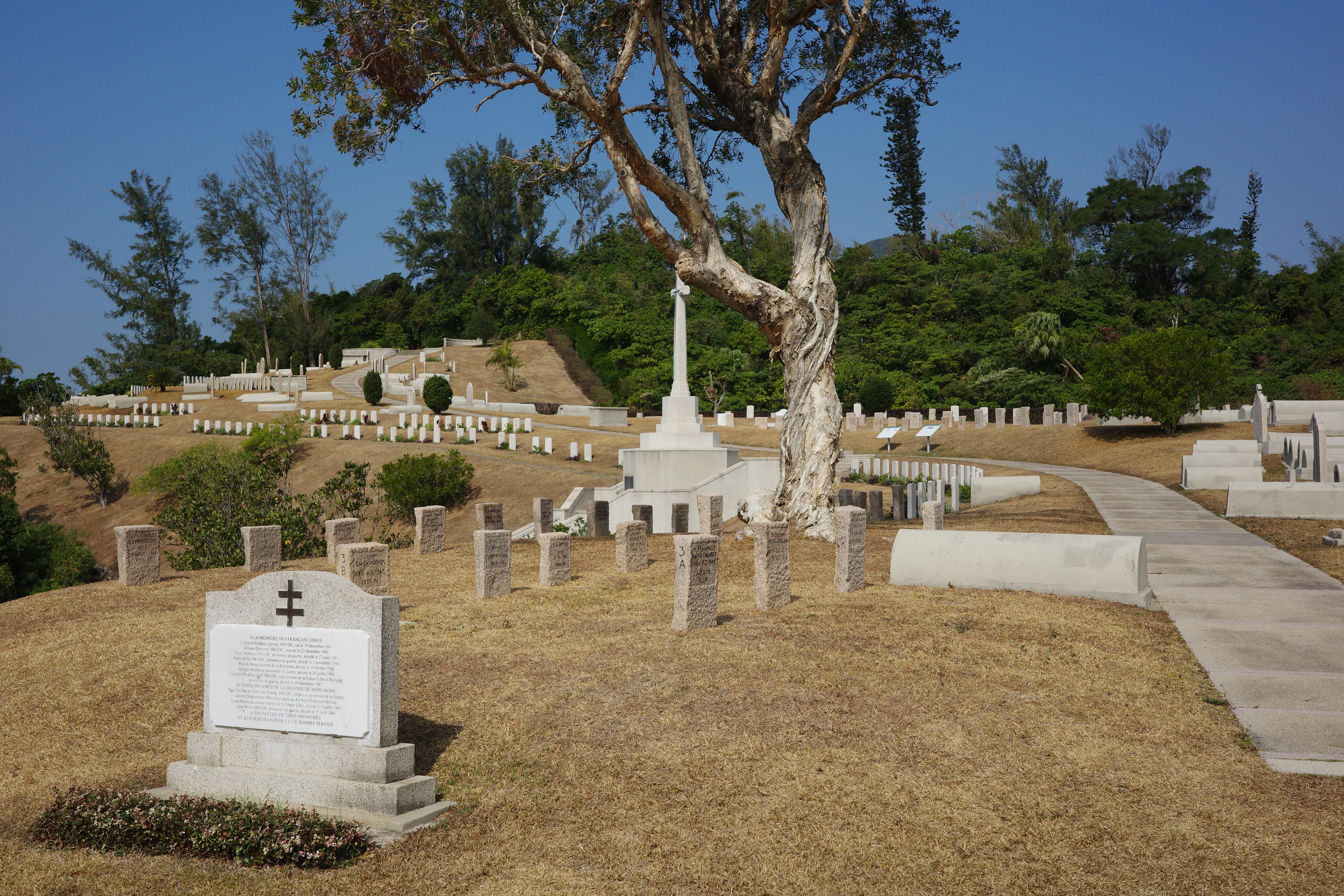
- Stanley Military Cemetery in 2026
- Interactive map of Stanley Military Cemetery

Details
- Established: 1841; 185 years ago
- Location: Wong Ma Kok Road, Stanley, Hong Kong
- Country: Hong Kong
- Type: British Military
- Owned by: Commonwealth War Graves Commission (governing body)
- No. of graves: 427
- Find a Grave: Stanley Military Cemetery

Stanley Military Cemetery
- Traditional Chinese: 赤柱軍人墳場
- Simplified Chinese: 赤柱军人坟场
Transcriptions
Standard Mandarin
- Hanyu Pinyin: Chìzhù Jūnrén Fénchǎng
Yue: Cantonese
- Yale Romanization: Chek chyúh gwān yàhn fàhn
- Jyutping: Cek3 cyu5 gwan1 jan4 fan4 coeng4

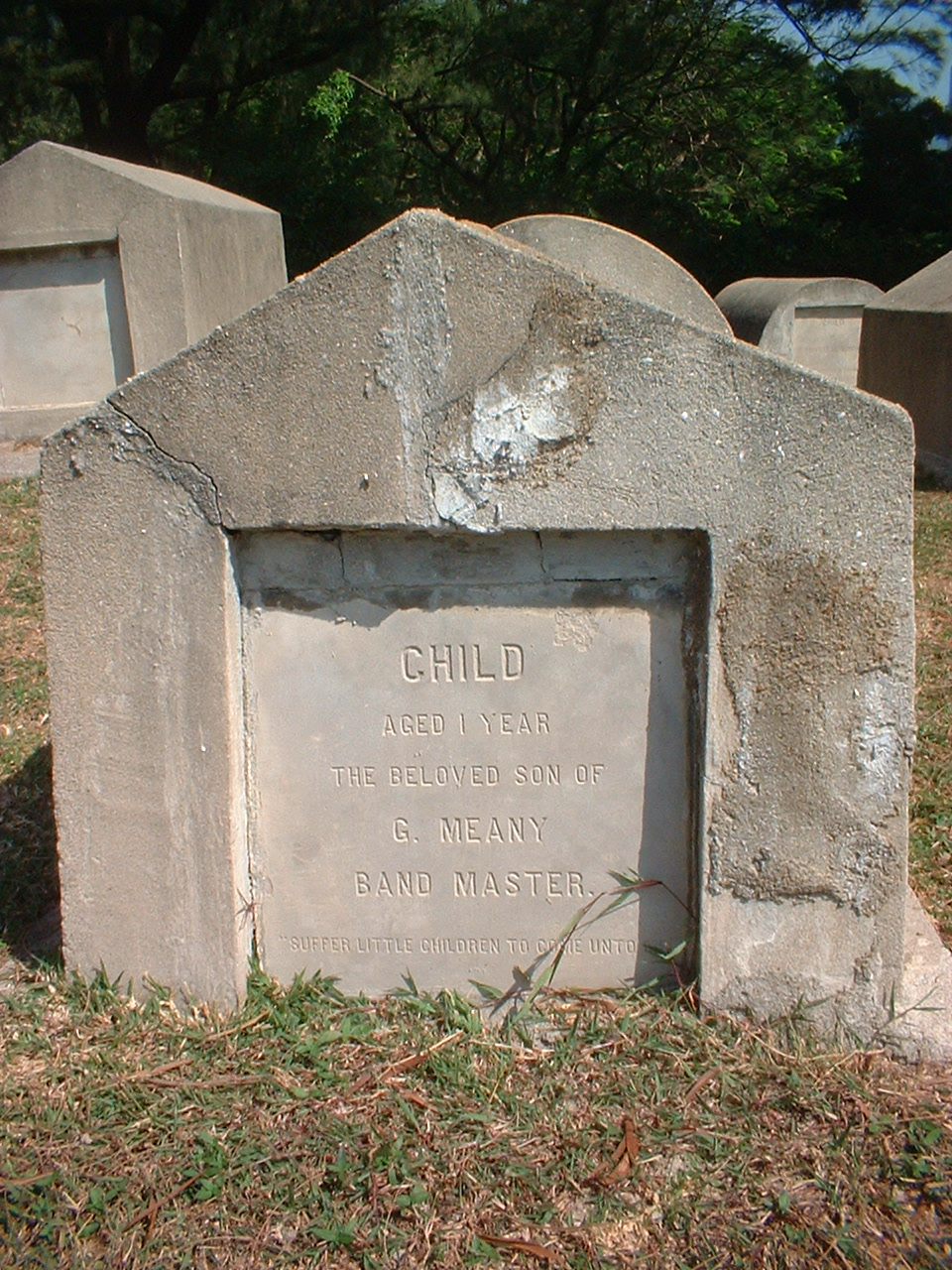
An example of an early burial of soldier's family at the Stanley Military Cemetery

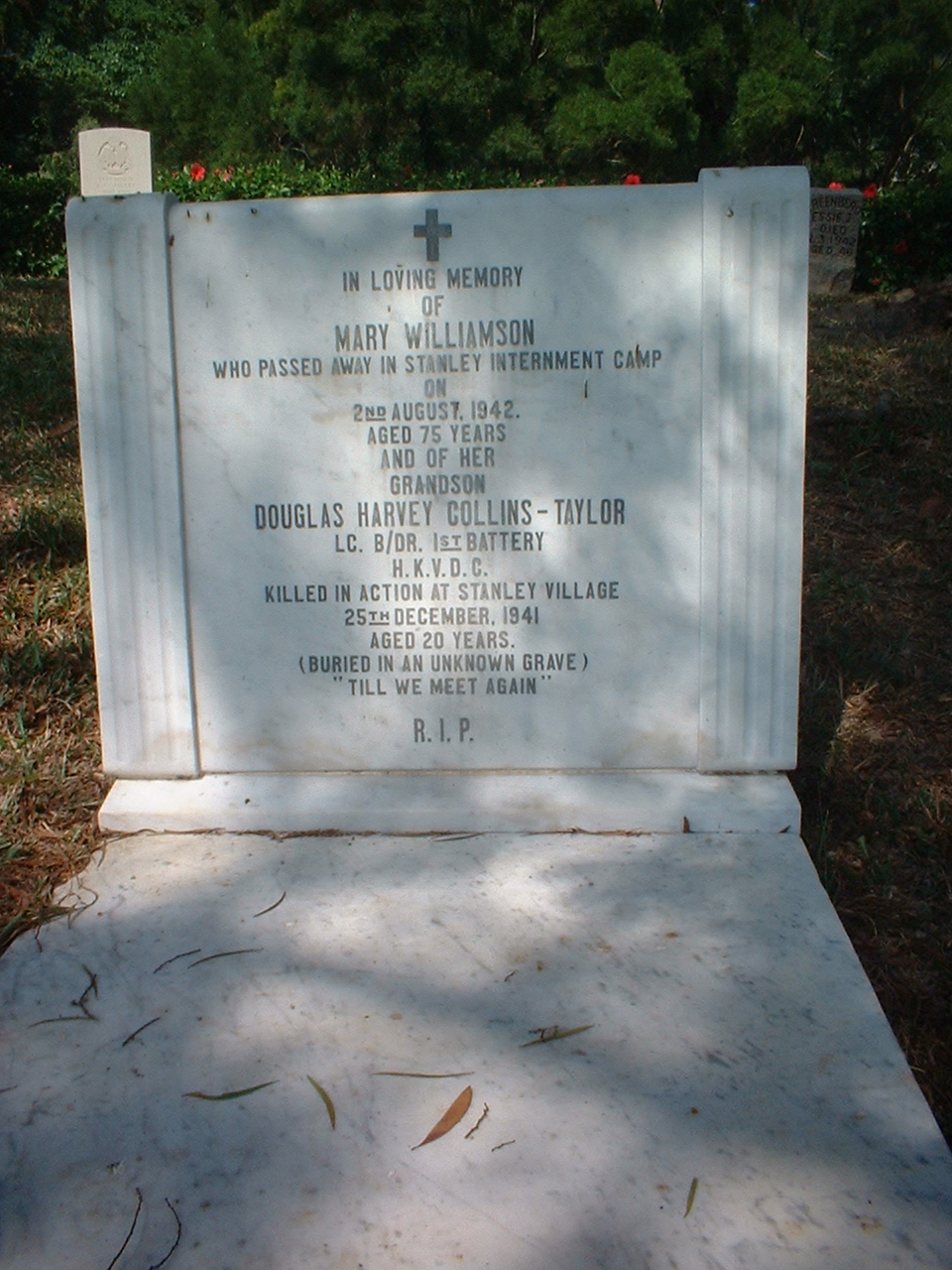
Grave of one Mary Williamson, who died in the Stanley Camp and a cenotaph memorial for her grandson, Lance Corporal Douglas H. Collins-Taylor of Hong Kong Volunteer Defence Corp., who was killed in action at Stanley Village. That grave has given some hints of the final stage of the 1941 defence.

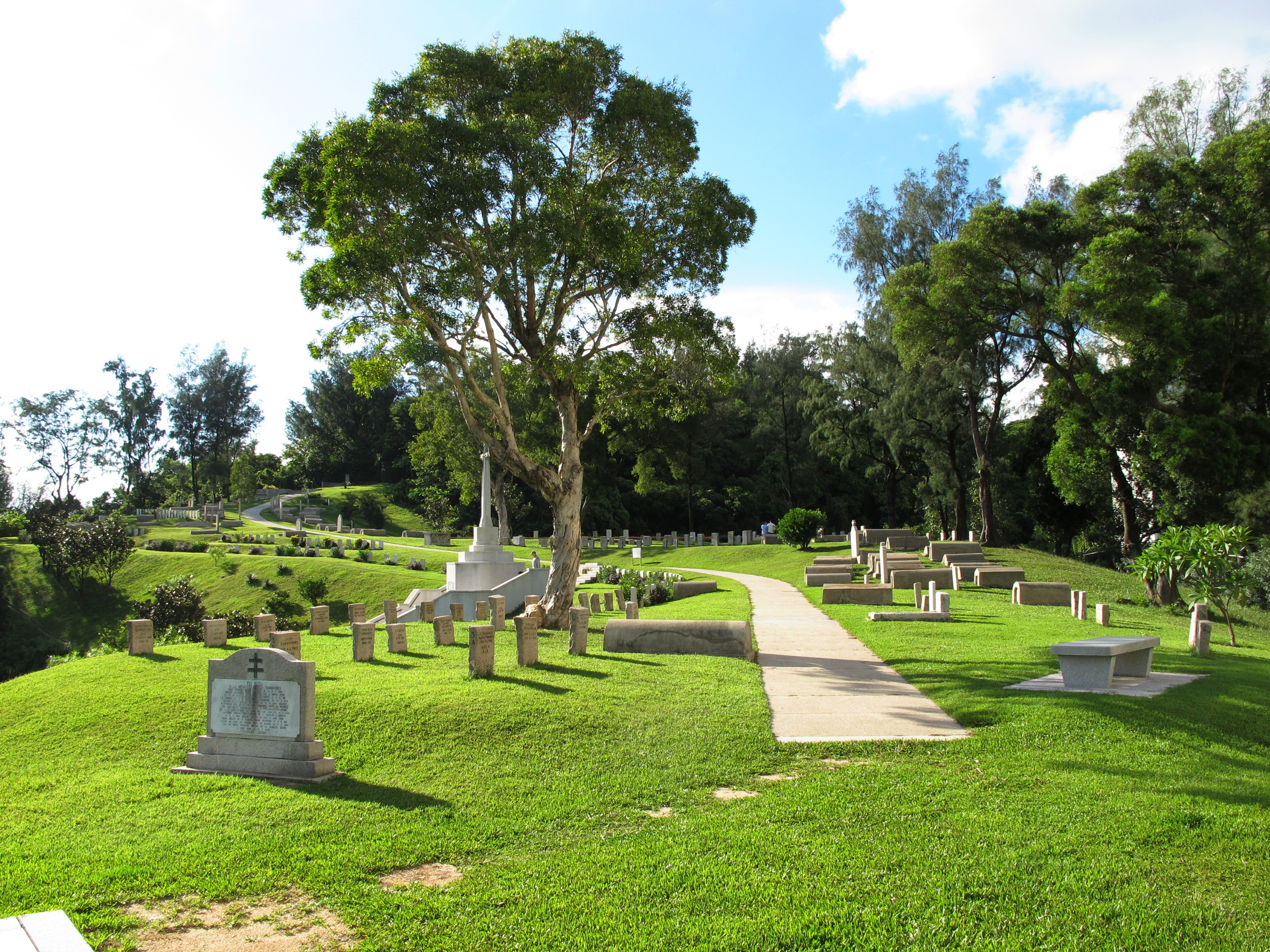
Graves of the people who died in the Stanley Camp. Their fellow prisoners used whatever stone they could get for headstones.

Stanley Military Cemetery is a cemetery located near St. Stephen's Beach in Stanley, Hong Kong. Along with the larger Hong Kong (Happy Valley) Cemetery, it is one of two military cemeteries of the early colonial era, used for the burials of the members of the garrison and their families between 1841 and 1866. There were no further burials here until World War II (1939–1945).

The cemetery is roughly triangular in shape and stands on ground rising sharply from the road side. It is approached by a flight of steps leading up to the Cross of Sacrifice with steep grassy slopes on either side.

== The Cemetery and Hong Kong Defence ==
On 8 December 1941, Japan launched an invasion of Hong Kong, which resulted in the British surrendering on Christmas Day of that year. Stanley Village was one of the last battlefields of the defence. The Royal Rifles of Canada, many elements of the Hong Kong Volunteer Defence Corps, and sections from the Middlesex were stationed there. Fighting occurred in the cemetery itself on the afternoon of Christmas Day, when D Company Royal Rifles of Canada tried to force the advancing Japanese from Bungalow C.

At the British surrender, the majority of the western civilians in Hong Kong were confined at Stanley Internment Camp, which included the grounds of St Stephen's College and the warders accommodation of the prison (which is now Stanley Prison of Hong Kong); while the military personnel were sent to either North Point Camp, Sham Shui Po POW camp, Ma Tau Chung Camp and Argyle Street Camp. Due to the lack of food and medical drugs in the camp, many people died at Stanley and were buried here at the time. Those "raw graves" are still preserved in their original shape. Following the Japanese surrender, many other wartime fatalities from this part of Hong Kong were also re-interred in the cemetery.

== Burials in the 20th century ==
There are 598 World War II burials (including non-British Allied soldiers and two from the Hong Kong Police Force) in the cemetery. Of these burials, 175 of them are unidentified and 96 are civilian internees (including four children). Eric Moreton, a Methodist missionary who died of wounds sustained while driving an ambulance in Wanchai during the fighting at the Royal Naval Hospital on 26 December 1941, is also buried in the cemetery.

War dead from the period 19–26 December 1941 of the defence were buried at Plots 5–6 in the cemetery. Among them were a few Canadians who were sent to Hong Kong three weeks prior the invasion (the majority of the many Canadians who died at the time are interred at Sai Wan).

Another notable group of personnel that were buried or commemorated there are those who served in the British Army Aid Group, which helped POWs in Hong Kong or other Japanese occupied zones to escape to China, and arranged military needs for resistance in those zones. Among them was Captain M.A. Ansari, who was originally in the 5/7th Rajput Regiment but from Ma Tau Chung POW Camp co-ordinated with the British Army Aid Group after the surrender. He was also a posthumous recipient of the George Cross. Also Colonel Lance Newnham of the Middlesex Regiment, John Alexander Fraser of the British Army Aid Group, Captain Douglas Ford of the Royal Scots and Flight Lieutenant Hector Gray of Royal Air Force were also a posthumous recipient of the George Cross for the same reason too.

There are some burials after the war, arranged at Spot 8.

On the other hand, there are three commemorations of casualties (one from Hong Kong Volunteer Defence Corps and two from the Chinese Labour Corps) of the First World War, buried elsewhere in the territory and whose graves are now lost.

The larger group of World War II military burials is at Sai Wan War Cemetery in Chai Wan.

== Gallery ==
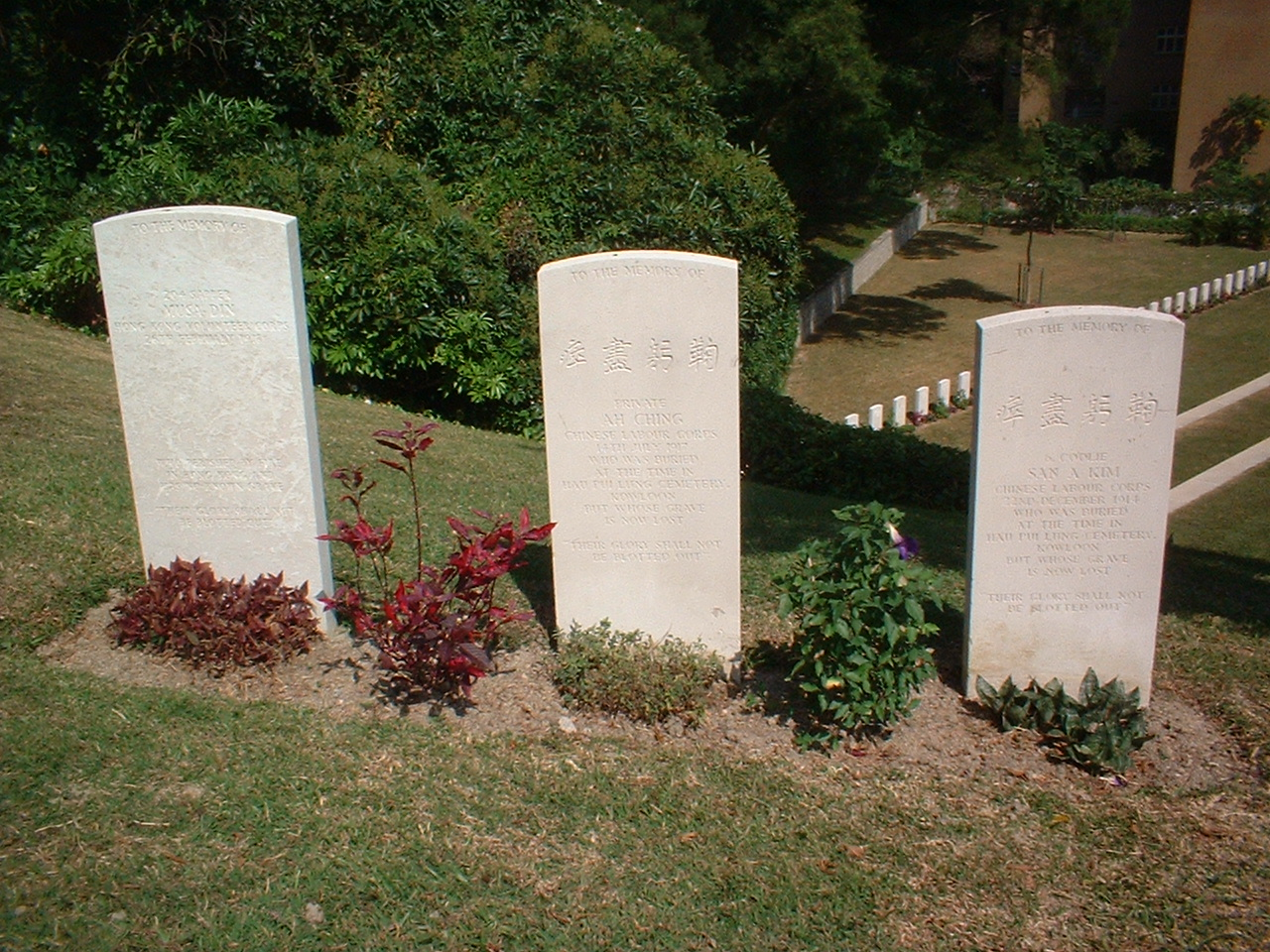
The commemoration of casualties of the First World War, buried elsewhere in the territory and whose graves are now lost.

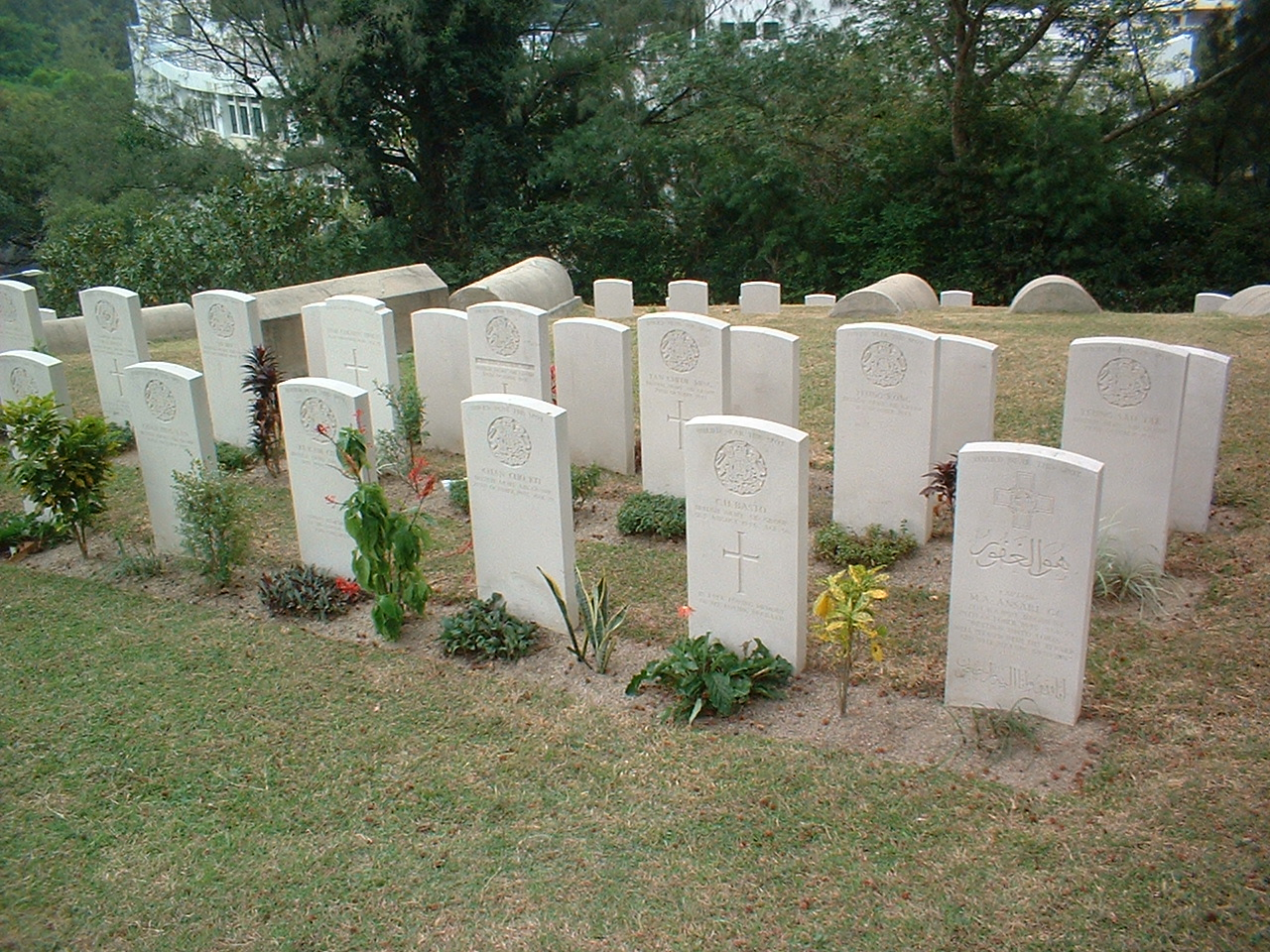
These two line of headstones are for those who fell during World War II whose graves are lost, including Captain M.A. Ansari, a recipient of George Cross.

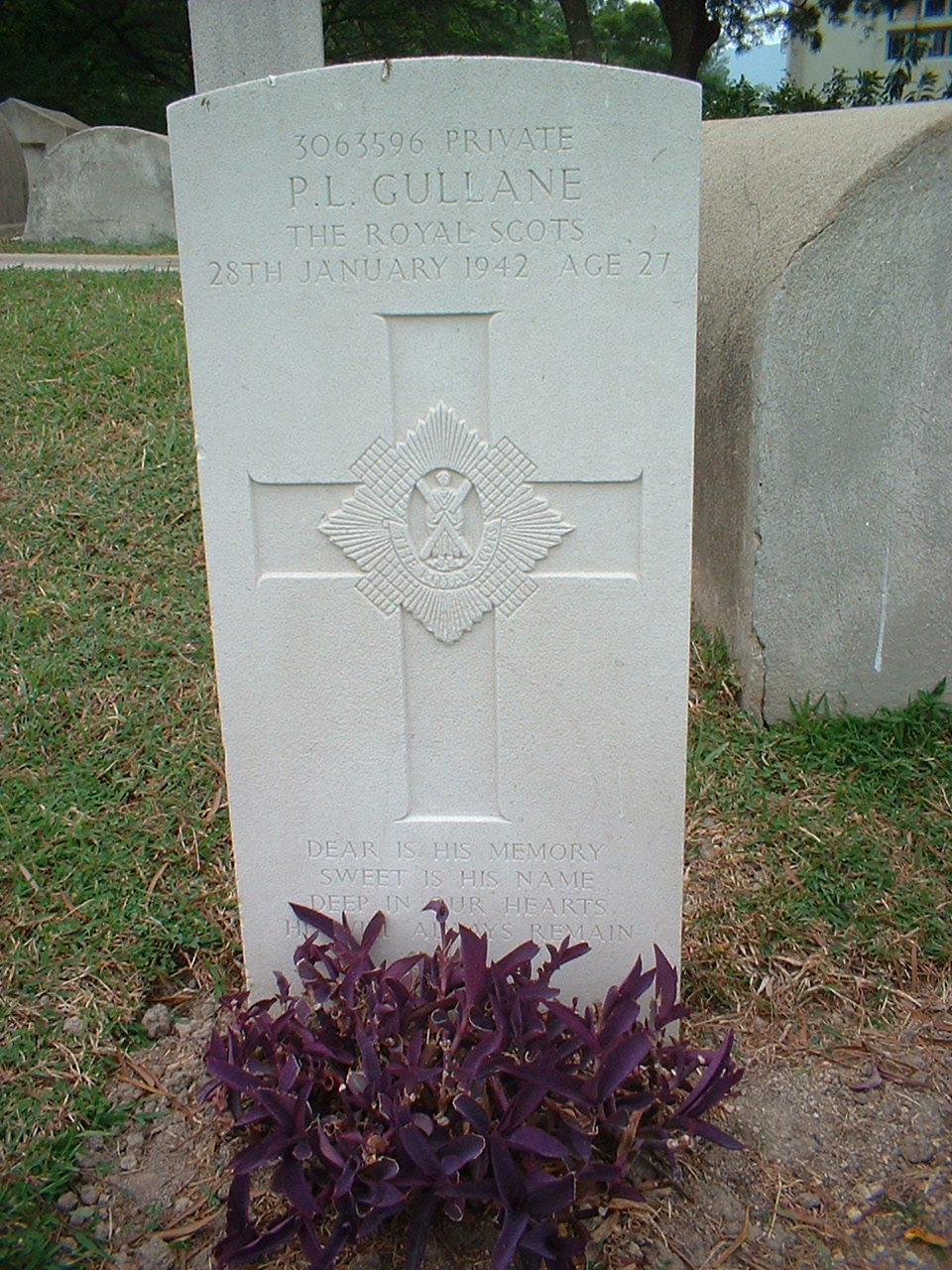
Grave of Pvt. P.L. Gullane of the Royal Scots, died after the British surrender.

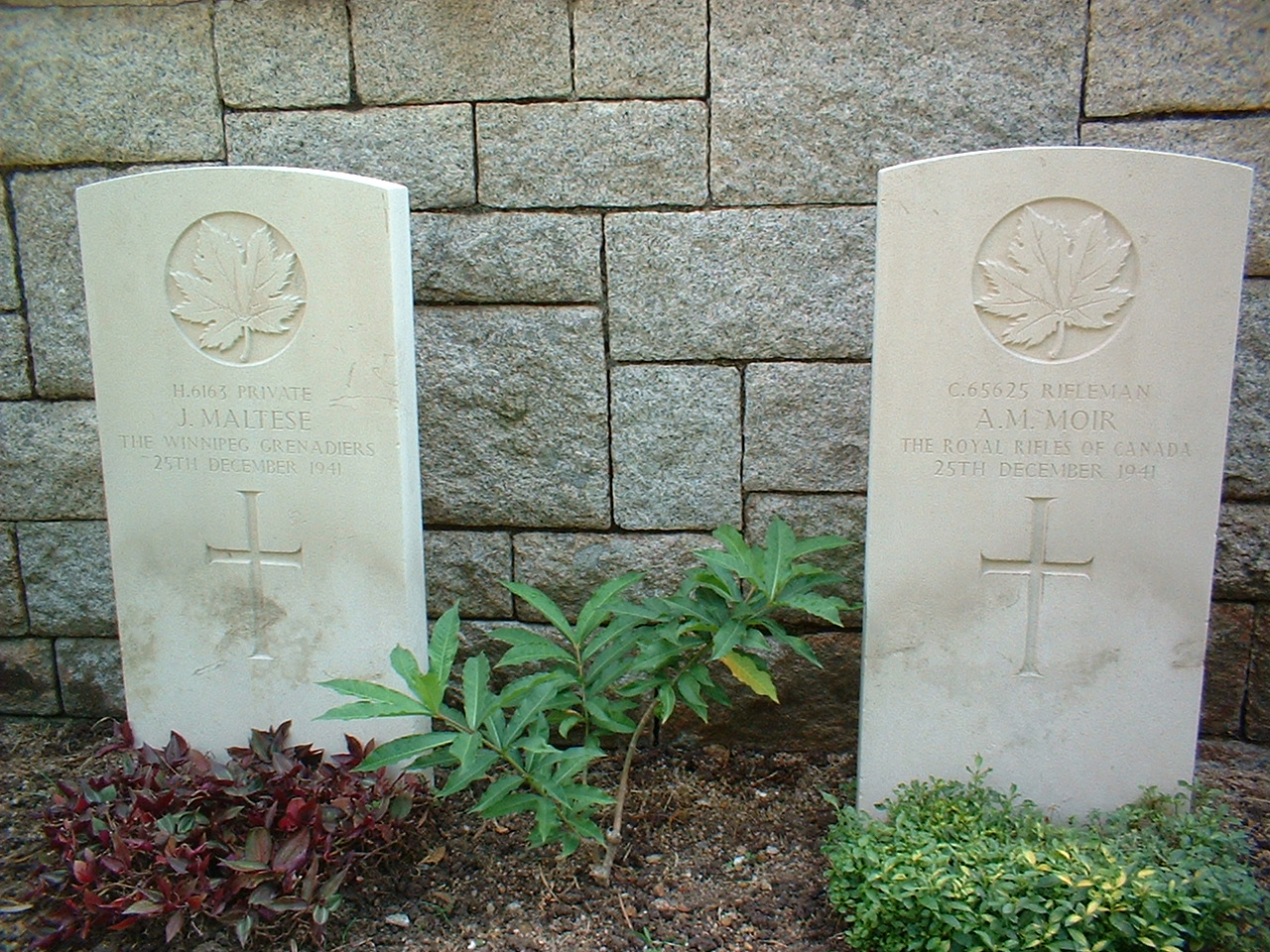
Graves of Pvt. J. Maltese of the Winnipeg Grenadiers and Rifleman A.M. Moir of the Royal Rifles of Canada. Both battalions (commonly known as "C Force") were sent to Hong Kong in November 1941, just three weeks before the invasion.

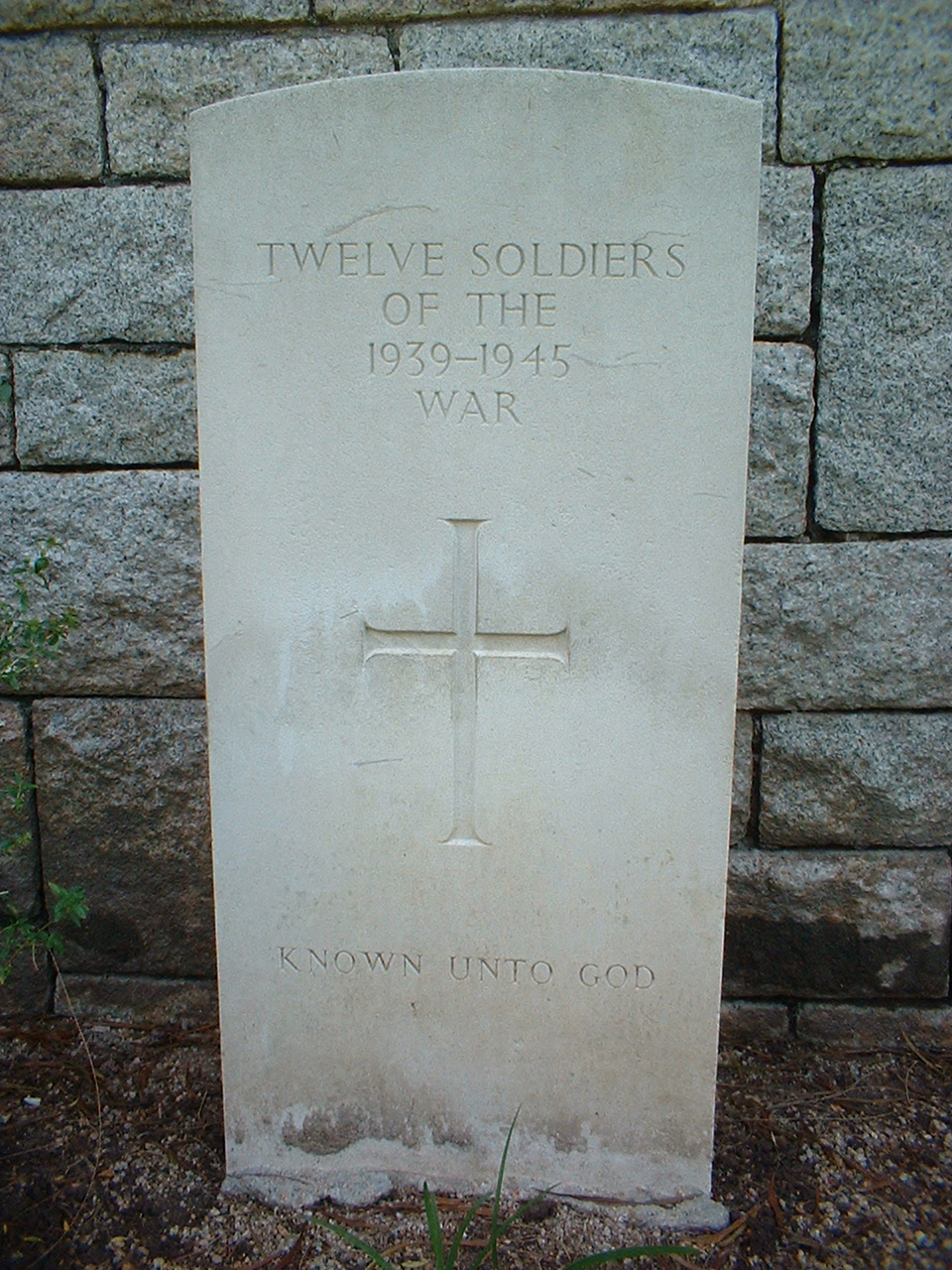
Headstone for 12 unknown soldiers who fell in the war at Stanley Military Cemetery.

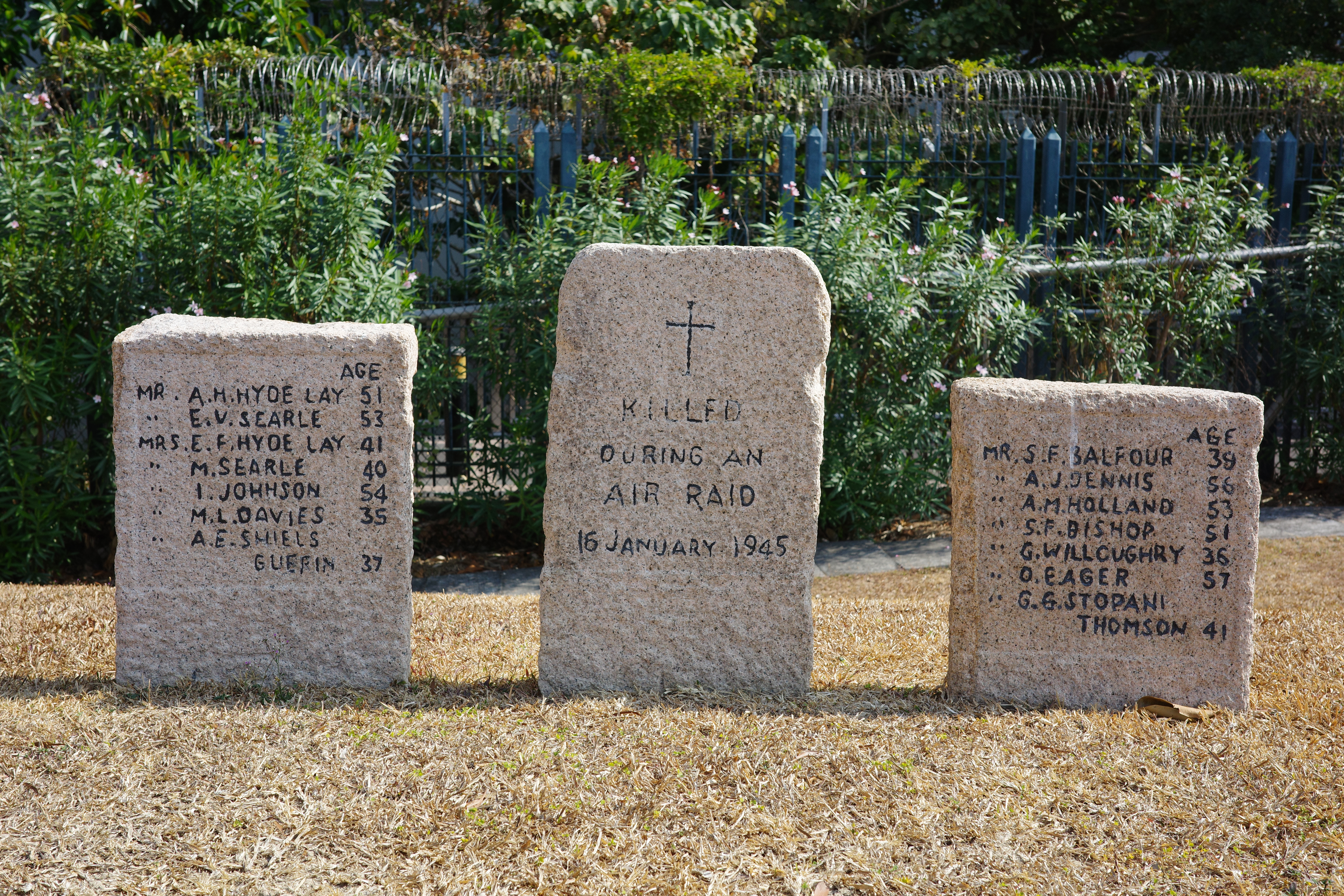
The headstones of the grave for the 14 internees killed in the US Navy raid on Hong Kong on 16 January 1945

== See also ==
- List of cemeteries in Hong Kong
