= Lance Newnham =

Recipient of the George Cross

Colonel Lance Newnham GC MC
- Born: 3 August 1889; British India
- Died: 18 December 1943 (aged 54); Sham Shui Prison Camp, Japanese-occupied Hong Kong
- Relatives: Lt-col Arthur Newnham (father)
- Military career
- Allegiance: United Kingdom
- Branch: British Army
- Service years: 1910–1943
- Rank: Colonel
- Service number: 6265
- Unit: Middlesex Regiment
- Conflicts: World War I: Battle of the Somme; Battle of Arras; World War II: Pacific War; Battle of Hong Kong (POW); Japanese occupation of Hong Kong (executed)
- Awards: George Cross; Military Cross

Colonel Lanceray Arthur Newnham GC MC (3 August 1889 – 18 December 1943), known as Lance or Lan Newnham, was a British Army officer. He was posthumously awarded the George Cross for the gallantry he showed in resisting Japanese torture during the Second World War.

== Early life ==
Newnham was born on 3 August 1889 in India. He was the son of Lieutenant-Colonel Arthur Newnham and his wife, Ekaterina. He was educated at Bedales School in England.

== First World War ==
Newnham was first deployed to France to join the British Expeditionary Force as a Captain with the Middlesex Regiment (Duke of Cambridge's Own) in August 1915.

On 5 February 1916 he was appointed as the Brigade Major, 169th (Infantry) Brigade, 56th (London) Division, Territorial Force, holding the post through the severe fighting of the Somme Offensive of 1916 and the Arras Offensive of 1917, until relinquishing it on 27 May 1917. He then served for five months as General Staff Officer 2nd Class at the New Zealand Divisional Headquarters. On 1 January 1917 Captain Newnham was awarded the Military Cross for service during the First World War.

On 7 January 1918 he married Phillys Edith Henderson at St. Mary's Church, Finchely, Middlesex, England. (Marriage Register, England & Wales).

== Second World War ==
Newnham was serving with the British Army Aid Group in British Hong Kong at the start of the Second World War. He was taken prisoner when the Japanese invaded Hong Kong in December 1941 and, with Captain Douglas Ford and Flight Lieutenant Hector Bertram Gray worked to contact British agents and organise a mass escape. The Japanese discovered the plan and arrested the trio, torturing them in Stanley Prison in an effort to gain more information. They refused to divulge any further names despite being beaten, starved and threatened with death. They were killed by firing squad in Sham Shui Prison Camp on 18 December 1943.

He is buried at the Stanley Military Cemetery in Hong Kong.
