= James Gray Kyd =

Scottish actuary

James Gray Kyd CBE FFA FRSE (9 August 1882 – 25 June 1968) was a Scottish actuary who was Registrar General for Scotland from 1937 to 1949 and president of the Faculty of Actuaries from 1944 to 1946.

== Life ==
He was born in Aberdeen on 9 August 1882, the son of Thomas Kyd, actuary, and later manager of the Northern assurance company. The family lived at 74 Queen's Road in Aberdeen.

Kyd attended Aberdeen Grammar School. He then joined his father's firm at the Northern Assurance and enrolled as an actuary student in 1903. He was admitted as a Fellow of the Faculty of Actuaries in 1907. In 1912, he left to join the Civil Service. This in turn led him to a job in the Irish Insurance Commission in Dublin where he stayed until 1921. He moved to London in 1926 and rose to be Principal Actuary in the Civil Service. In 1937, he returned to Scotland as Registrar General in place of Andrew Froude who had retired due to ill-health.

In 1940, he was elected a Fellow of the Royal Society of Edinburgh. His proposers were John Alexander Inglis, Alexander Aitken, Sir John Jeffrey and Alexander Graham Donald. He was made a Commander of the Order of the British Empire in 1942.

His diverse interests led him to be both chairman (and co-founder) of the Scots Ancestry Research Society from 1945 to 1968 and honorary president of the Scottish Rights of Way Society from 1959 to 1962. His time given to these activities increased following retirement in 1948.

He died on 25 June 1968 at Hurstpierpoint in Sussex.

== Family ==
In 1912, he married Marjorie Amey Chalmers.

== Publications ==
- The Mortality Experience of Scotland 1930-32 (1937)
- Scottish Population Statistics (1952)
- Drove Roads and Bridal Paths Around Braemar (1958)
