= Douglas Ford (British Army officer) =

Recipient of the George Cross

- Born: 18 September 1918; Galashiels, Scotland
- Died: 18 December 1943 (aged 25); Sham Shui Prison Camp, Japanese-occupied Hong Kong
- Burial place: Stanley Military Cemetery, Hong Kong
- Military career
- Allegiance: United Kingdom
- Branch: British Army
- Service years: 1939–1943
- Rank: Captain
- Service number: 99752
- Unit: Royal Scots
- Conflicts: Second World War: Pacific War; Fall of Hong Kong (POW); Japanese occupation of Hong Kong (executed)
- Awards: George Cross

Captain Douglas Ford, GC (18 September 1918 – 18 December 1943) was a British Army officer of the Royal Scots and a British prisoner of war in the Second World War, who was posthumously awarded the George Cross for conspicuous gallantry. His citation was published in the London Gazette on 18 March 1946.

== Early life ==
Ford was born in Galashiels on 18 September 1918. He was a son of Mrs and Mr Douglas Ford, of 25 Bryce Avenue, Portobello. He was educated at the Royal High School, Edinburgh. A keen sportsman, excelling in rugby and cricket, he rose to school captain in 1936. He was 20, and on part-time studies at the University of Edinburgh for chartered accountancy, when he joined the Royal Scots at the outbreak of war. A member of the University OTC, he was commissioned, and posted to Hong Kong. His brother, James Allan Ford, was also a captain in the Royal Scots. This was the first time that two brothers in the regiment had served together in Hong Kong.

== Second World War ==
Ford was still serving in the 2nd Battalion, Royal Scots, when he and his brother were taken prisoner by the invading Japanese upon the fall of Hong Kong in December 1941. During his captivity at Sham Shui Po POW camp he made contact with British agents and planned, in conjunction with other officers, a major break out. Before the plans could be put into operation the Japanese grew suspicious and interrogated him and others they suspected of involvement. Despite torture in Stanley Prison, starvation and a sentence of death he refused to betray his comrades. After being forced to dig his own grave, he was executed by Japanese firing squad, at Sham Shui on 18 December 1943, with two fellow prisoners, Colonel Lance Newnham of the Middlesex Regiment, and Flight Lieutenant Hector Gray of the Royal Air Force. He is buried in Stanley Prison cemetery.

The citation noted:

Captain Ford was interrogated, tortured, starved, and finally met his death with Colonel Newnham. Throughout his terrible ordeal, the behaviour of Captain Ford was superb. He refused to implicate any others. He maintained his spirits and those of his fellow prisoners until the end. His self-control, superb heroism, and self-sacrifice in face of the most brutal torture cannot have been surpassed.

King George VI approved the award '"in recognition of the most conspicuous gallantry in carrying out hazardous work in a very brave manner".

Captain Ford is buried in Stanley Military Cemetery, Hong Kong, grave reference 1.B.41.

His brother, James Allan Ford, survived the war and later wrote a novel based on the life and death of Douglas Ford, Season of Escape, which was awarded the Frederick Niven Award.
