= John Fraser (British Army officer, born 1896) =

Recipient of the George Cross

John Alexander Fraser
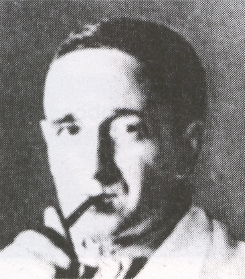
- Born: 12 February 1896; Edinburgh, Scotland
- Died: 29 October 1943 (aged 47); St. Stephen's Beach, Stanley, Japanese Occupation of Hong Kong
- Burial place: Stanley Military Cemetery, Hong Kong
- Military career
- Allegiance: United Kingdom
- Branch: British Army
- Rank: Major
- Units: Royal Scots Fusiliers; Machine Gun Corps; British Army Aid Group
- Conflicts: First World War; Second World War
- Awards: George Cross; Military Cross & Bar

Major John Alexander Fraser, GC, MC & Bar (Chinese: 傅瑞憲, 12 February 1896 – 29 October 1943) was a British colonial officer who was posthumously awarded the George Cross, the highest British Commonwealth award for bravery out of combat, for his "magnificent conduct" and "outstanding courage" in resisting Japanese torture during the Second World War.

== First World War ==
Born in Edinburgh in 1896, and educated at Trinity Academy and the University of Edinburgh, Fraser was commissioned into the Royal Scots Fusiliers during the First World War. He served as a machine gun officer and won the Military Cross (MC) in 1916. The MC was announced in the London Gazette on 20 October 1916, and the citation read:

Temp. 2nd Lt. John Alexander Fraser, R. Sc. Fus. For conspicuous gallantry during operations. When the enemy was working round the position, he took his machine-guns up to a position in the open in a shell-hole. Here he remained for four hours, and materially assisted, first in checking, and then in stopping the enemy's attack.

Fraser transferred to the Machine Gun Corps on 27 March 1916, was promoted lieutenant on 1 November 1916, and won a Bar to his MC in 1917. He later commanded a machine gun company, with the acting rank of major, and was permitted to retain that rank when he was demobilized.

== Second World War ==
Joining the Colonial Government of Hong Kong in October 1919 and having been called to the Bar in 1931, Fraser was an Assistant Attorney General when the Japanese invaded in 1941. Interned in the Civil Internment Camp in Stanley, he was instrumental in organising escape plans and operated a radio in secret. The suspicions of the Japanese were aroused and Fraser was arrested and severely tortured but refused to betray his companions. The Japanese, unable to break his resistance, executed him, most likely by beheading, on 29 October 1943. He is buried in Stanley Military Cemetery.

The full citation for his George Cross was published in a supplement to the London Gazette of 25 October 1946 and read:

St. James's Palace, S.W.1, 29th October, 1946.

The KING has been graciously pleased to make the undermentioned awards of the GEORGE CROSS: —

John Alexander FRASER (deceased), lately Assistant Attorney-General, Hong Kong.

Fraser was interned by the Japanese in the Civilian Internment Camp, Stanley, and immediately organised escape plans and a clandestine wireless service. He was fully aware of the risks that he ran but engaged continuously in, most dangerous activities and was successful, not only in receiving news from outside, but also in getting important information out of the Camp. Eventually he was arrested and subjected to prolonged and severe torture by the Japanese who were determined to obtain information from him and to make him implicate the others who were working with him. Under this treatment he steadfastly refused to utter one word that could help the Japanese investigations or bring punishment to others. His fortitude under the most severe torture was such that it was commented upon by the Japanese prison guards. Unable to break his spirit the Japanese finally executed him. His devotion to duty, outstanding courage and endurance were the source of very real inspiration to others and there can be no doubt the lives of those whom the Japanese were trying to implicate were saved by his magnificent conduct.
