= Mateen Ansari =

British Indian Army officer

Mateen Ahmed Ansari
- Born: 15 December 1916; Hyderabad, Hyderabad State, British India
- Died: 29 October 1943 (aged 26); Hong Kong
- Military career
- Allegiance: British India
- Branch: British Indian Army
- Rank: Captain
- Unit: 7th Rajput Regiment
- Awards: George Cross

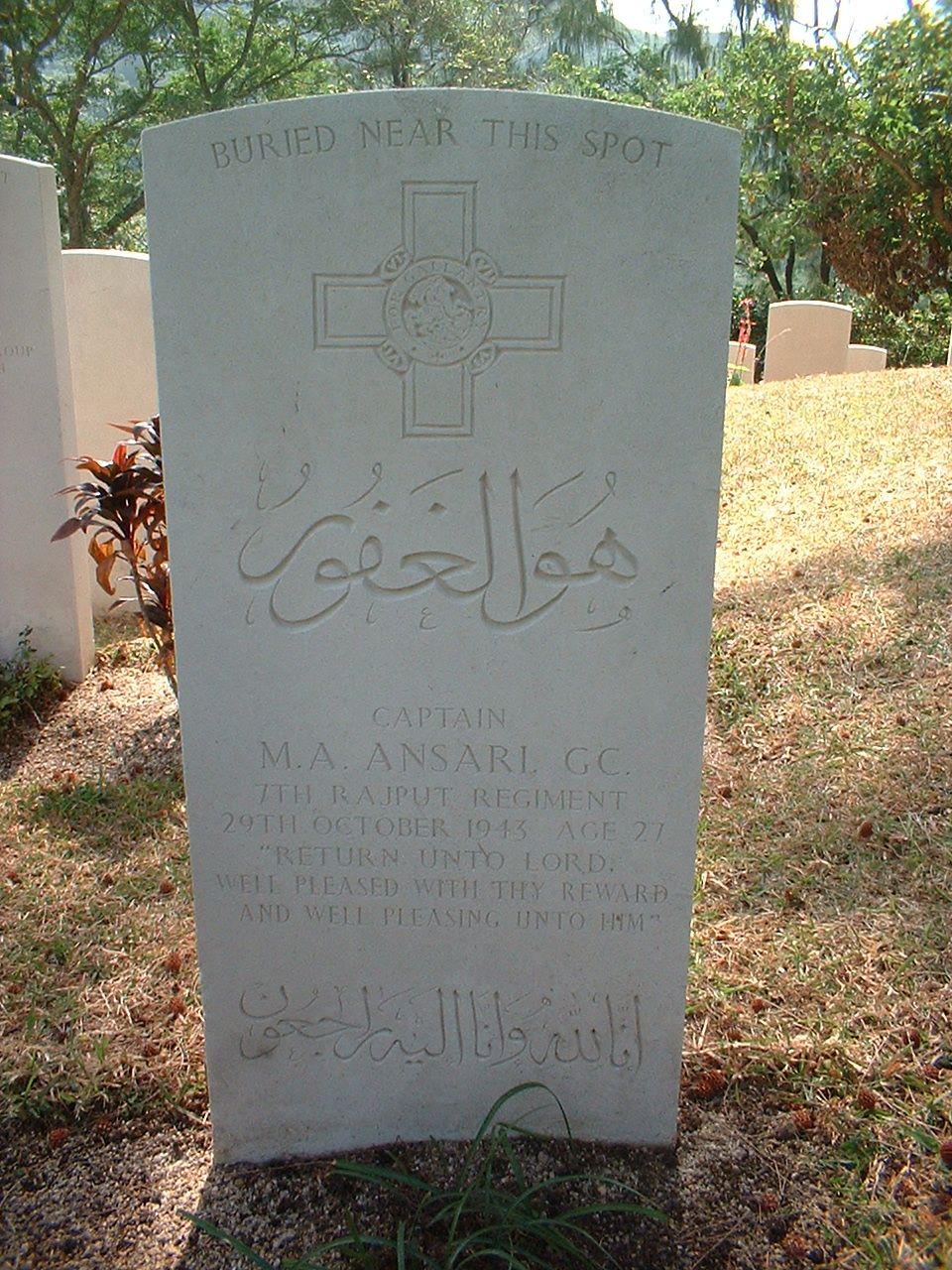
Headstone of Captain Mateen Ahmed Ansari at Stanley Military Cemetery

Captain Mateen Ahmed Ansari GC (15 December 1916 – 29 October 1943) of the 5th Battalion, 7th Rajput Regiment, in the Indian Army during World War II, and member of the British Army Aid Group. He was awarded the George Cross posthumously. The decoration, the highest British (and Commonwealth) award for bravery out of combat, was announced in a supplement to the London Gazette of 16 April 1946 as being awarded for the 'most conspicuous gallantry.'

He was taken prisoner when Japan occupied Hong Kong in December 1941 after the Battle of Hong Kong. After the Japanese discovered that he was related to the ruler of one of the Princely States they demanded that he renounce his allegiance to the British and foment discontent in the ranks of Indian prisoners in the prison camps. He refused and was thrown into the notorious Stanley Jail in May 1942 where he was starved and brutalised. And also held in Ma Tau Chung Camp, where he expended efforts to counter Japanese recruiting work for the collaborationist Indian National Army. When he remained firm in his allegiance to the British on his return to the prison camps he was again incarcerated in Stanley Jail where he was starved and tortured for five months. He was then returned to the original camp, where he continued in his allegiance to the British, and even helped to organise escape attempts by other prisoners. He was sentenced to death, with over thirty other British, Chinese and Indian prisoners and beheaded on 29 October 1943. He is buried in Stanley Military Cemetery in Hong Kong.

== See also ==
- List of George Cross recipients
