= John McQueen Johnston =

Scottish physician and pharmacologist (1901–1987)

John McQueen Johnston FRSE CBE FRCPE FRCSE LLD (1901–1987) was a Scottish physician and pharmacologist. He served as the Principal Medical Officer for the Department of Health in Scotland until 1968.

== History ==
He was born in Falkirk in central Scotland on 26 December 1901, the son of a local schoolmaster. He studied medicine at Glasgow University graduating MB ChB in 1923.

From 1925 to 1931 he served as the local GP to Torridon on the north-west coast of Scotland. He then began lecturing in Materia Medica at Glasgow University. Concurrently he worked direct for the Department of Health in Scotland rising to be Principal Medical Officer to Scotland.

He received his doctorate (MD) in 1934. In 1936 he was elected a Fellow of the Royal Society of Edinburgh. His proposers were Ralph Stockman, Thomas Nicol, John Walton and Sir Edward Battersby Bailey. He was created a Commander of the Order of the British Empire (CBE) in 1968.

Johnston died in Edinburgh on 28 July 1987 but is buried near his early home, in Dalarossie churchyard in Inverness-shire in northern Scotland.
