= Ian Ford (statistician) =

Scottish doctor, academic

Professor Ian Ford FRSE FRCPGlas

Personal details
- Born: Glasgow, Scotland
- Occupation: Biostatistician

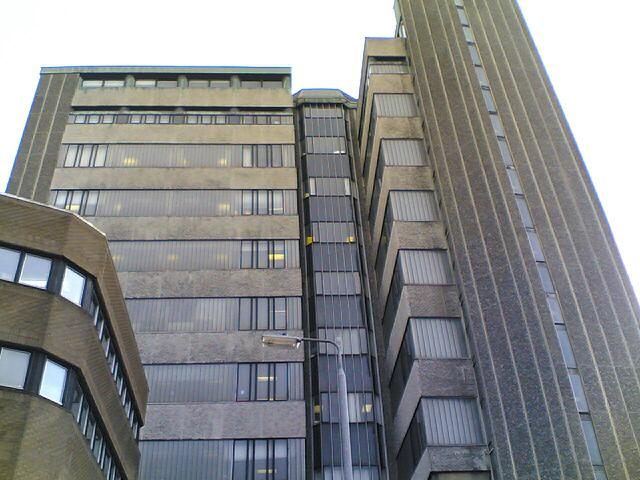
The Robertson Centre for Biostatistics is in the Boyd Orr Building, University of Glasgow

Ian Ford is a Scottish doctor who is a professor of biostatistics and a director of the Robertson Centre for Biostatistics, and a former Dean of Faculty of Information and Mathematical Sciences, at the University of Glasgow.

== Biography ==
Ford was born in Glasgow and educated at the former Hamilton Academy. He studied at the University of Glasgow, graduating with a BSc and in 1976, was awarded a PhD in Statistics. From 1976-77, he was visiting Lecturer to the University of Wisconsin-Madison and since then successively Lecturer, Senior Lecturer, Reader, Personal Professor and Professor at the University of Glasgow. He is the first holder of the Chair of Biostatistics at the University.

Ford has been the Director of the Robertson Centre for Biostatistics since 1991 and Director of the Glasgow Clinical Trials Unit. He is also a member of the editorial boards for the international journals, Statistical Methods for Medical Research; Journal of Evaluation in Clinical Practice and Public Library of Science Medicine. He has written numerous papers.

In 1999, Ford was elected Fellow of the Royal Society of Edinburgh. He is also a Fellow of both the International Statistical Institute and the Royal College of Physicians and Surgeons of Glasgow. A member of the Cholesterol Triallists Collaboration and the Fibrinogen Studies Collaboration, Ford is also a member of the American Statistical Association; Statisticians in the Pharmaceutical Industry; the Drug Information Association; the Royal Statistical Society; and the International Society for Clinical Biostatistics.

From 2000–04, Ford served as Dean of the Faculty of Information and Mathematical Sciences, University of Glasgow.
