= Ian Ford (rugby union) =

Wales international rugby union player

- Full name: Ian Reginald Ford
- Born: 6 June 1929 Cardiff, Wales
- Died: 7 November 2020 (aged 91)
- School: Bassaleg School

Rugby union career
- Position: Lock
International career
Years	Team	Apps	(Points)
1959	Wales	2	(0)

Ian Reginald Ford (6 June 1929 — 7 November 2020) was a Welsh international rugby union player.

Ford was born to English parents in Cardiff and attended Bassaleg School, where he learned his rugby.

A towering lock, Ford was capped twice for Wales in the 1959 Five Nations, against England at Cardiff Arms Park and Scotland at Murrayfield. He made 482 appearances for his club Newport and was regarded as amongst their best performers when they upset the 1963-64 All Blacks, playing beside Brian Price in the second row.

== See also ==
- List of Wales national rugby union players
