= James Allan Ford =

Scottish writer, soldier and civil servant (1920–2009)

James Allan Ford CB MC (10 June 1920 – 30 March 2009) was a Scottish writer, soldier and senior civil servant.

Born in Auchtermuchty, Fife, Ford was brought up in Edinburgh and educated at the Royal High School. In 1938 he entered the civil service, worked in the Ministry of Labour and Inland Revenue.

During the Second World War he served with the Royal Scots in Hong Kong, with the rank of captain. When Hong Kong was taken by the Japanese, Ford and his brother Douglas were captured and held as prisoners-of-war. Douglas was executed, and James was not released until 1945. He received the Military Cross for his service.

Returning to Edinburgh, Ford rejoined the civil service and studied law part-time. From 1966 to 1969 he was Registrar General for Scotland, and went on to the Scottish Office. He was awarded the CB in the 1978 Birthday Honours, shortly before his retirement. Ford was president of the writers' association Scottish PEN during the 1980s, and was a trustee of the national Library of Scotland.

Ford wrote five novels in the 1960s and 1970s. His first two books dealt with his wartime experiences, and the second Season of Escape, was awarded the Frederick Niven Award for its portrayal of his brother Douglas Ford. Two of his later novels, A Statue for a Public Place and A Judge of Men are set in Edinburgh. A quotation from the former is inscribed into Edinburgh's Makars' Court.
