= Andrew Froude =

Andrew Froude ISO (9 August 1876 – 4 June 1945) was a Scottish civil servant who served as the Registrar General for Scotland.

== Life ==
Born the son of a blacksmith in 1876 at Stonehouse, South Lanarkshire, Andrew Froude won a place to attend the Hamilton Academy.

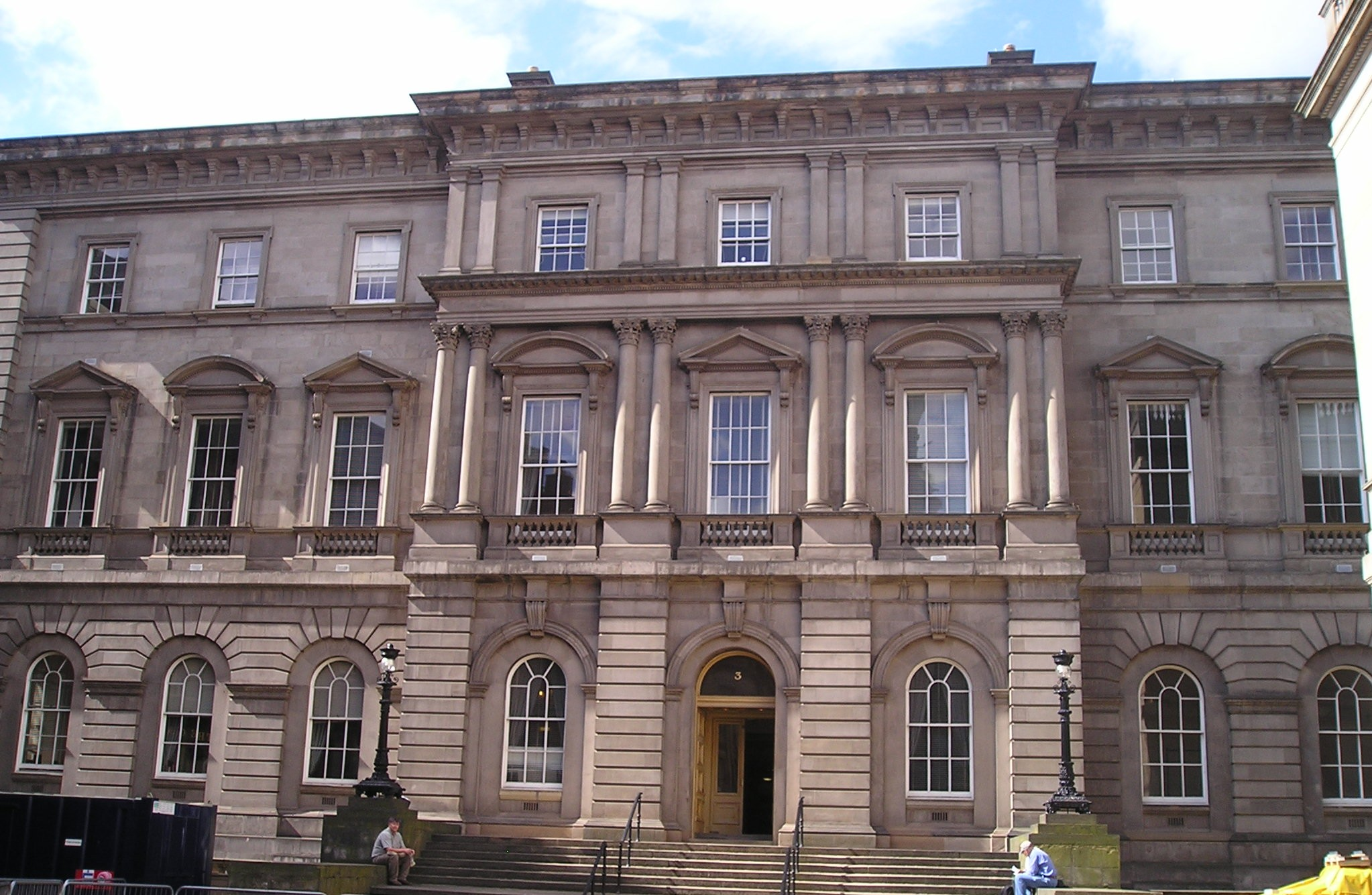
New Register House, Edinburgh - General Register Office for Scotland

Froude entered the civil service in London in 1897, subsequently transferring to the General Register Office for Scotland, at Edinburgh; in 1911 being appointed a superintendent of that year's Census. In 1925 Froude was promoted to Secretary of the General Register Office, the administrative 'second' to the Registrar General, and in 1930 was appointed Registrar General for Scotland, a post he held from 3 September 1930 to 14 February 1937, in which year he retired, due to ill health, awarded the Imperial Service Order. Froude was succeeded in his role by James Gray Kyd.

Andrew Froude died in Edinburgh in June 1945 at the age of 68.
