= John Ronald Peddie =

Sir John Ronald Peddie (1887–1979) was a Scottish educational administrator and author. He was both Secretary and Treasurer of the Carnegie Trust for Scotland.

== Life ==
He was born on 5 January 1887 the son of Richard Dawes Peddie of Grangemouth. He was educated at Grangemouth High School. He then studied at Glasgow University graduating MA in 1909 and immediately beginning lecturing at the university.

In the First World War he served at the rank of adjutant with Glasgow University's Officer Training Corps, receiving a military MBE for his work. After the war he was promoted to senior lecturer. 1925 he moved to Teacher Training, as advisor on arts and in 1941 he moved to the Carnegie Trust.

In 1937 he was made a Knight Commander of the Order of the British Empire by King George VI. In 1942 he was elected a Fellow of the Royal Society of Edinburgh. His proposers were Sir Ernest Wedderburn, James Ritchie, John Edwin MacKenzie, and James Pickering Kendall. He served as the society's treasurer 1957 to 1967 and as vice president from 1967 to 1970.

He retired in 1957 and died in Edinburgh on 11 November 1979.

== Family ==
In 1914 he married Euphemia Scott Houston.

== Publications ==
- The British Citizen (1920)
- The Carnegie Trust for the Universities of Scotland, 1901-1951, the first Fifty Years (1951)
