= General Register Office for Scotland =

Directorate of the Scottish Government

Logo of the General Register Office

The General Register Office for Scotland (GROS) (Scottish Gaelic: Oifis Choitcheann a' Chlàraidh na h-Alba) was a non-ministerial directorate of the Scottish Government that administered the registration of births, deaths, marriages, divorces and adoptions in Scotland from 1854 to 2011. It was also responsible for the statutes relating to the formalities of marriage and conduct of civil marriage in Scotland. It administered the census of Scotland's population every ten years. It also kept the Scottish National Health Service Central Register.

On 1 April 2011 it was merged with the National Archives of Scotland to form National Records of Scotland. All the former department's functions continue as part of the new body.

== History ==
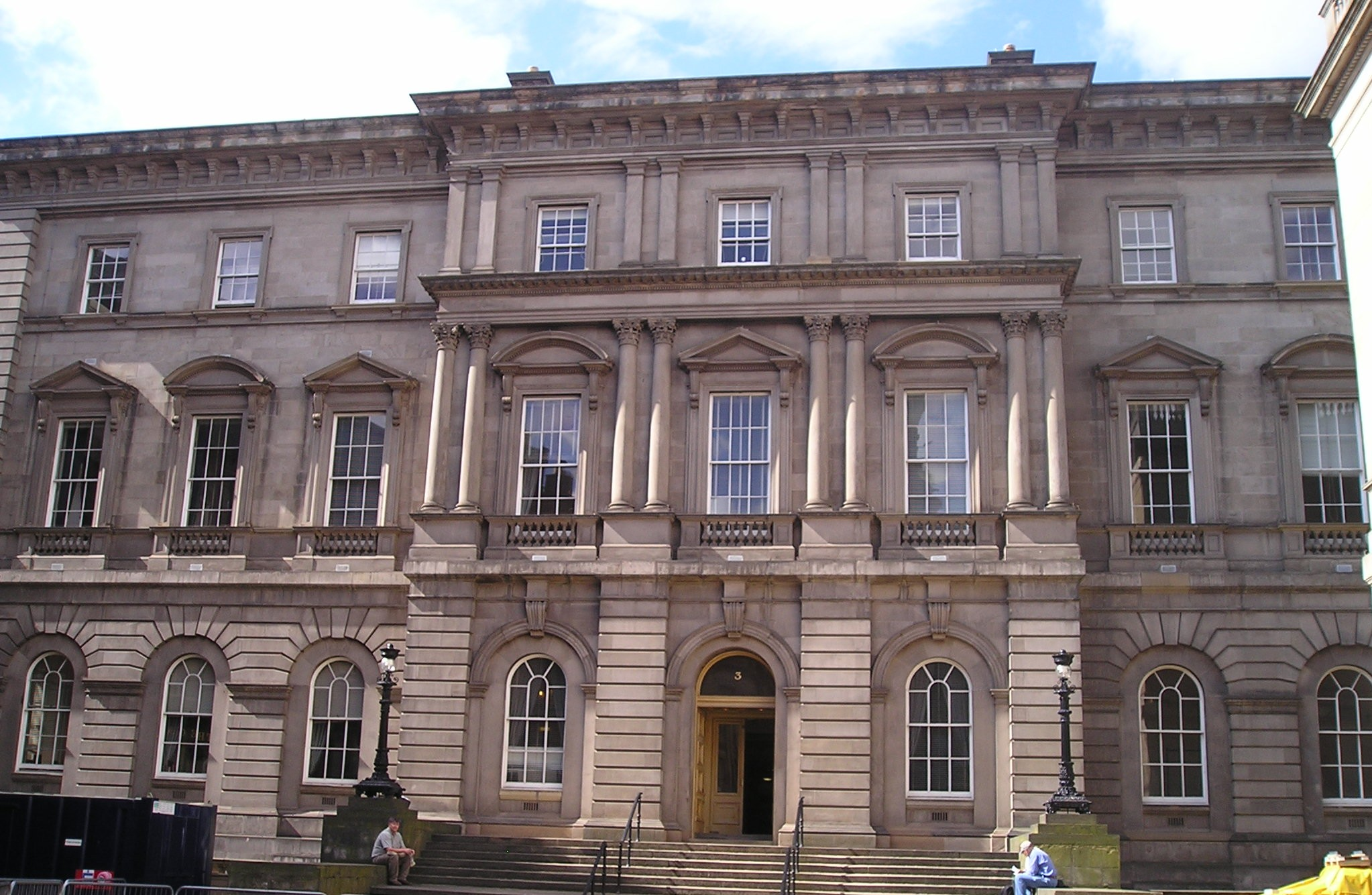
New Register House, Edinburgh

Initially ministers of the Church of Scotland were responsible for keeping parish records of baptisms and marriages, but only for their own church members. Later the Privy Council of Scotland, following the suggestion of the General Assembly of the Church of Scotland enacted that all parish ministers should keep a record of baptisms, burials and marriages. This situation continued until Parliament passed the Registration of Births, Deaths and Marriages (Scotland) Act 1854, transferring responsibility to the state.

The Registration of Births, Deaths and Marriages (Scotland) Act 1854 created the General Register Office of Births, Deaths and Marriages, headed by the Registrar General with the appointment of registrars in every parish. It also provided that the Registrar General should produce an annual report to be forwarded to the Home Secretary to be laid before Parliament, containing a general abstract of the numbers of births, deaths and marriages registered during the previous year. The first general abstract (relating to 1855) was submitted in 1856.

The parochial and burgh divisions in Scotland were adopted as the basis of registration, and the session clerks of the Church of Scotland were, in most cases, appointed as the first registrars under the act. Where the parish or burgh was too large for a single registrar, the sheriff was empowered to divide it into districts. Registers were to be produced in duplicate, and one was to be sent to the Office of the Scottish Registrar General in Edinburgh. Compulsory civil registration began in Scotland on 1 January 1855, and coverage seems to have been complete for marriages and deaths. Birth registration took rather longer to bed down, but by the time of his first annual detailed report, published in 1861, the first Registrar General for Scotland, William Pitt Dundas, claimed that: "there is good reason for believing that very few births indeed now escape registration."

In 1855 and 1860, two acts, the Registration (Scotland) Act 1855 (18 & 19 Vict. c. 29) and the Registration (Scotland, Amendment) Act 1860 (23 & 24 Vict. c. 85), were passed which amended some of the sections of the 1854 act. The original act had placed considerable burdens on the sheriffs of the Scottish counties, who had already played a role in the taking of decennial censuses. The amending acts reduced their responsibilities by appointing registration district examiners to inspect the registers. They also made revised provision for the transmission of the parochial registers up to the year 1820 to the General Register Office Scotland (GROS), and the registers for the years 1820–1855 to the custody of the local registrars. These registers were to be retained by the registrars for 30 years, after which they were to be sent to the GROS.

On 1 April 2011 GROS was merged with the National Archives of Scotland, with which it already had close ties and shared management of the Scotland's People Centre in Princes Street, Edinburgh, to form National Records of Scotland.

== Superintendent of Statistics ==
From 1855 the role of accumulating and publishing statistics from data has fallen to one person. These people were:

- James Stark from 1855 to 1870
- William Robertson from 1871 to 1878
- Robert James Blair Cunynghame from 1879 to 1901
- James Craufurd Dunlop from 1902 to 1929
- Peter Laird McKinlay from 1930 to 1960

== Registrars General for Scotland ==
The Registrar General was also Deputy to the Lord Clerk Register. The Deputy Clerk Register had to be an Advocate of not less than ten years standing.

William Pitt Dundas was the first holder of the combined post of Deputy Clerk Register and Registrar General from September 1854 until April 1880. His successor, Roger Montgomerie, died six months after his appointment, and Mr Pitt Dundas resumed office for around a year, until the appointment of Sir Stair Agnew KCB. The last person to hold the combined posts was Sir James Patten McDougall KCB, in office from May 1909 to March 1919.

Originally, this was the supervision of birth, death and marriage registration. It was expanded to include the conduct of the 1861 Census and all subsequent ones (working closely with the Registrar General to ensure consistency) and other statistical functions.

In 1920 the Registrar General (Scotland) Act 1920 was passed which provided for the appointment by the Secretary of State for Scotland a whole-time Registrar General, Dr James Craufurd Dunlop, (previously Medical Superintendent of Statistics) was appointed.

On the formation of National Records of Scotland, the positions of Registrar General and Keeper of the Records of Scotland were initially kept separate, but on the retirement of Duncan Macniven in August 2011, George Mackenzie was appointed Registrar General in addition to his existing role as Keeper.

=== List of Registrars General for Scotland ===
- William Pitt Dundas, 12 September 1854 – 28 April 1880
- Roger Montgomerie, 19 April 1880 – 25 October 1880
- William Pitt Dundas, C.B., 17 November 1880 – 12 January 1881
- Sir Stair Agnew, K.C.B., 13 January 1881 – 30 April 1909
- Sir James Patten McDougall, K.C.B., 1 May 1909 – 7 March 1919
- Dr. James Craufurd Dunlop, 1 January 1921 – 2 September 1930
- Andrew Froude, I.S.O., 3 September 1930 – 14 February 1937
- James Gray Kyd, C.B.E. FRSE, 1 September 1937 – 30 November 1948
- Edmund Albert Hogan, C.B.E., 1 December 1948 – 31 May 1959
- Alexander Burt Taylor CBE D Litt, 1 June 1959 – 4 September 1966
- James Allan Ford CB MC, September 1966 - September 1969
- Archibald L Rennie, October 1969 - 11 June 1973
- William Baird, 12 June 1973 – 3 August 1978
- Victor Colvin Stewart, 4 August 1978 – 12 April 1982
- Dr Charles Milne Glennie CBE, 13 April 1982 – 31 October 1994
- James Meldrum, 1 November 1994 – 21 February 1999
- John Randall, 22 February 1999 – 1 August 2003
- Duncan Macniven, 4 August 2003 – 5 August 2011
- George MacKenzie, 8 August 2011 – 28 September 2012
- Audrey Robertson, 29 September 2012 - 3 February 2013
- Tim Ellis, 4 February 2013 - April 2018
- Anne Slater (Interim), April 2018 - 16 December 2018
- Paul Lowe, 17 December 2018 – 14 Feb 2023
- Janet Egdell, 15 Feb 2023 - Sep 24
- Alison Byrne, Oct 2024 - present

== New Register House ==
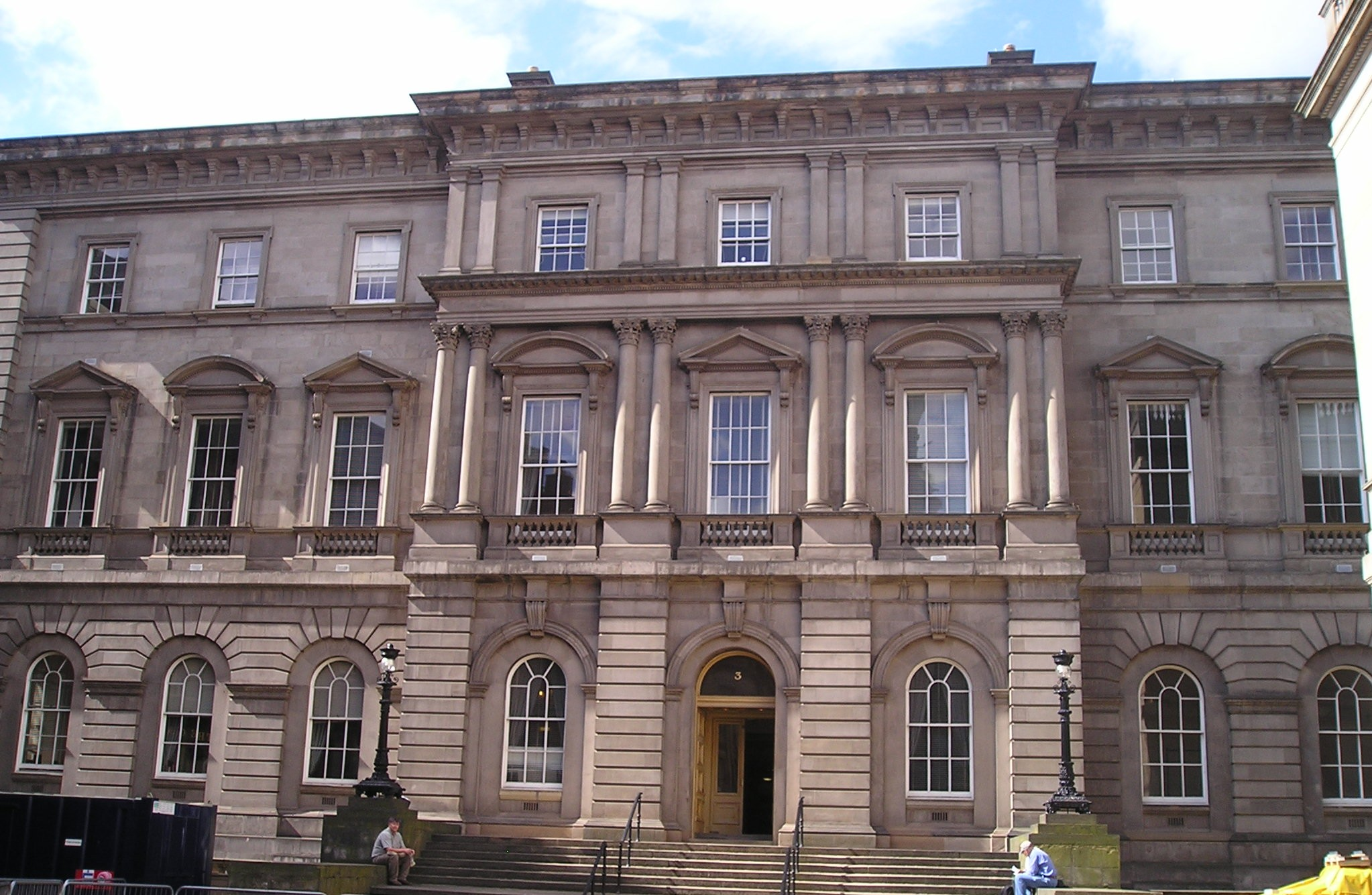
New Register House

New Register House, which houses the registration side of the former GROS's business, is close to the east end of Princes Street in Edinburgh. It was designed by Robert Matheson, the Clerk of Works at the Office of Her Majesty's Works in Scotland. Initially, the General Register Office had been located in General Register House. The building was erected on its present site near the Old Register House. The site was acquired in 1856 and the building was opened on 30 March 1861, though not completed until 1864 at a total cost of £40,000.

== Other buildings ==
GROS had two other main buildings: Ladywell House, in the Corstorphine area of Edinburgh, where population, household and vital statistics data (including Scotland's census) are housed; and Cairnsmore House on the Crichton Estate in Dumfries, home of Scotland's NHS Central Register. All three buildings are now part of the National Records of Scotland estate.

== See also ==
- Demographics of Scotland
- General Register Office for England and Wales
- General Register Office (Northern Ireland)
- General Register Office
- Genealogy
- National Archives of Scotland
- Office for National Statistics
- Registration of Births, Deaths and Marriages (Scotland) Act 1965
