= Robertson Centre for Biostatistics =

Biostatistical research center in Glasgow

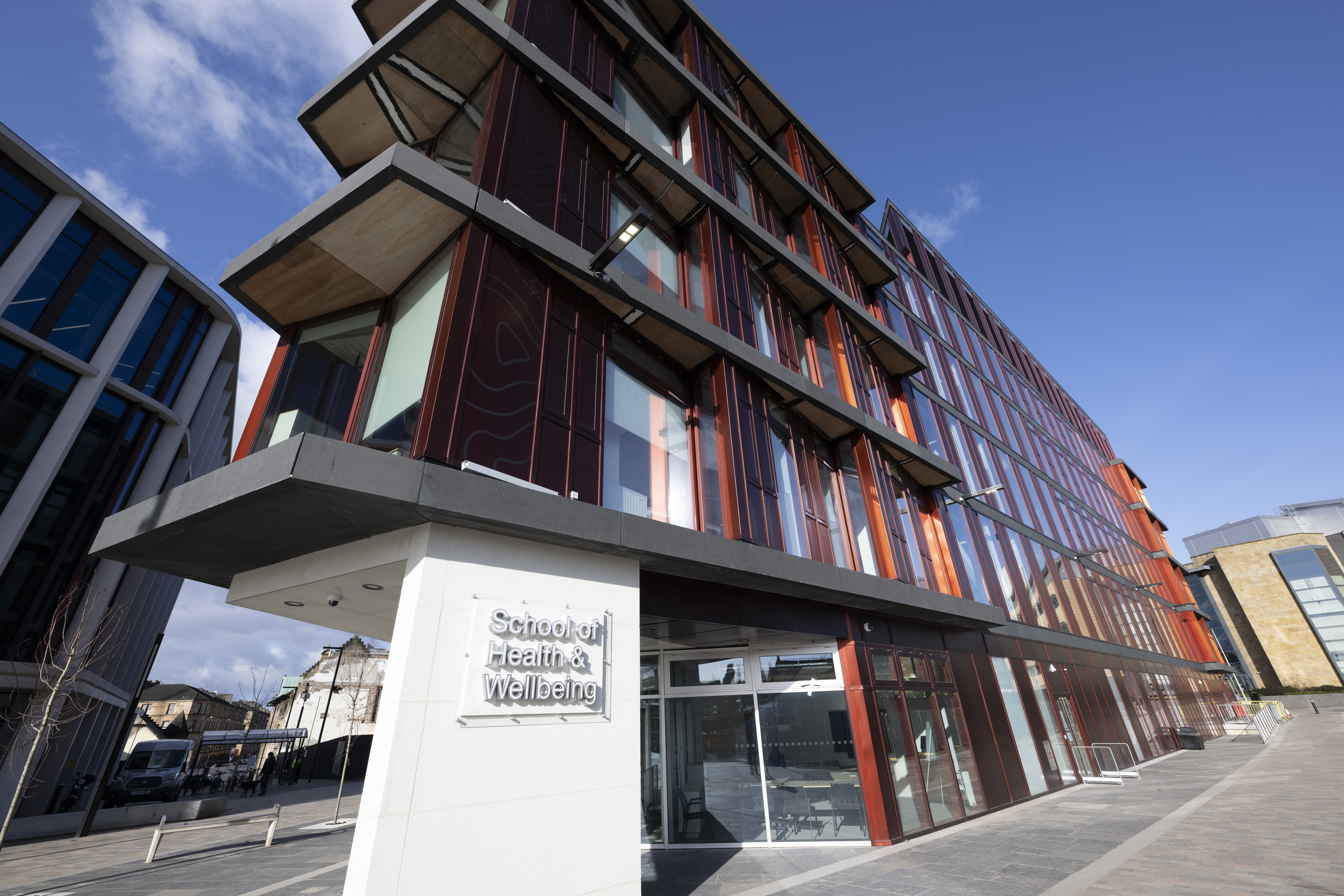
The Robertson Centre for Biostatistics is in the Clarice Pears Building, University of Glasgow, Glasgow, UK

The Robertson Centre for Biostatistics conducts and supports collaborative research in clinical trials and studies as part of the School of Health & Wellbeing in the College of Medical, Veterinary and Life Sciences at the University of Glasgow.
