= Leask =

Leask may refer to:

== Places ==
- Leask, Saskatchewan, a village in Canada
  - Rural Municipality of Leask No. 464, in Canada
- Leask Airport, adjacent to the Canadian village
- Leask Bay, New Zealand

== People ==
- Clan Leask, a Lowland Scottish clan
- Ada Leask (1899–1987), Irish historian and antiquary
- Arthur Leask (1880–1967), Spanish footballer
- Derek Leask (born 1948), New Zealand diplomat
- Devyn Leask (born 1999), Zimbabwean swimmer
- Edward Leask (born 1947), British sailor
- Harold G. Leask (1882–1964), Irish architectural historian and archaeologist
- Harry Leask (born 1995), British rower
- Henry Leask (1913–2004), British Army officer
- Julie Leask, Australian social scientist
- Kenneth Leask (1896–1974), British officer of the Royal Air Force
- Kristopher Leask, Scottish politician
- Laurie Leask (1912–1981), Australian rules footballer
- Lyndsey Leask (1935–2021), New Zealand softball player, coach and administrator
- Marilyn Leask (born 1950), Australian professor of education
- Michael Leask (born 1990), Scottish cricketer
- Nigel Leask (born 1958), British academic publisher
- Rob Leask (born 1971), Canadian-German ice hockey coach
- William Leask (1812–1884), Scottish dissenting minister and religious author
- William Keith Leask (1857–1925), Scottish writer and a classics lecturer
- John Leask Lumley (1930–2015), American professor of mechanical engineering and aerospace engineering

== Other uses ==
- Leask v Commonwealth, a High Court of Australia case that discussed the role of proportionality in the Australian Constitution
