= Alexander Robertson MacEwen =

British historian and writer (1856–1916)

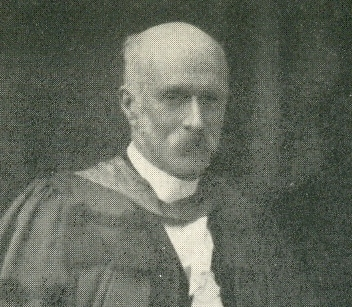
- From the frontispiece portrait of his biography: Life and times of Alexander Robertson MacEwen, D.D
- Born: 14 May 1856; Edinburgh, Scotland
- Died: 26 November 1916 (aged 60); Edinburgh, Scotland
- Occupations: Writer; biographer; teacher; minister; professor; classicist
- Spouse: Margaret Jane Begg
- Children: two sons
- Writing career
- Pen name: A. R. MacEwen
- Genres: Non-fiction, biography, history, classics, theology

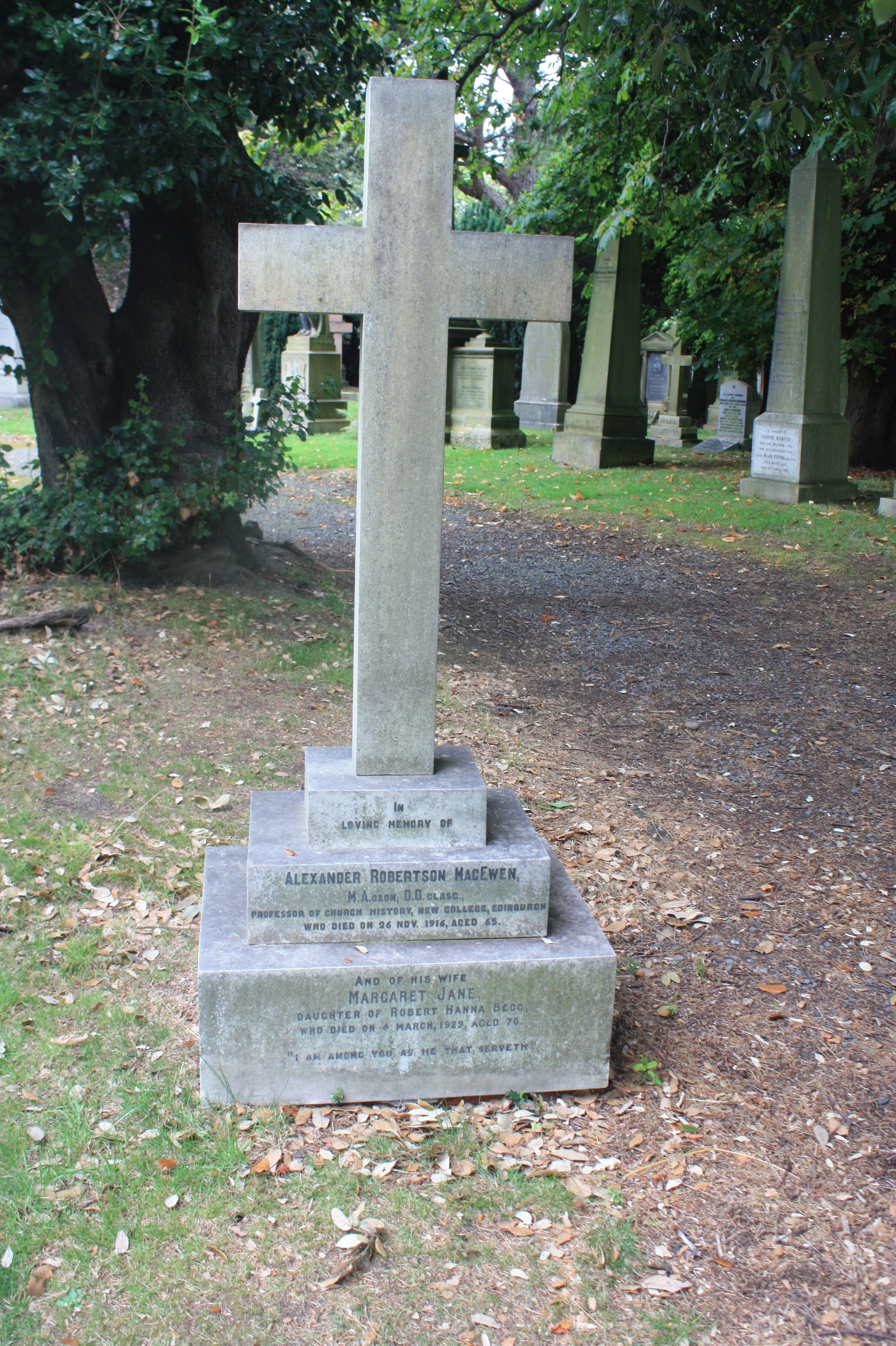
MacEwen's grave, Dean Cemetery

Alexander R. MacEwen (1856–1916) was a Scottish writer, minister, professor and Moderator of the United Free Church of Scotland.

== Life ==
He was born on 14 May 1856 at Edinburgh and was the son of Rev. Alexander MacEwen D.D., and Elisa Robertson. His childhood was spent in Helensburgh (1851–56) and he was then educated at Glasgow Academy (1856–66). He graduated M.A. at University of Glasgow in 1870, and was subsequently awarded B.D. (1879), and D.D. (1892). He attended Balliol College, Oxford (1870–74) and graduated M.A. in 1874. He spent a summer semester at University of Göttingen in 1877 and attended U.P. College, Edinburgh (1877–80). On 29 January 1885, he married Margaret Jane Begg of Moffat, and they had two sons. He travelled widely and visited Greece in 1883 and journeyed through Sinai and Palestine in 1892, writing many letters home about his experiences.

He died in Edinburgh on 26 November 1916 and was buried with his wife, Margaret Jane Begg (d.1929), on the eastern corner of the south-west section of Dean Cemetery. The grave is marked by a simple stone cross.

== Career ==
- 1875-7 – Assistant to George Gilbert Ramsay (1863–1906), Professor of Humanity at Glasgow University;
- 1879 – Student missionary at United Presbyterian Church of Scotland at Colson Street, Leith Walk, Edinburgh;
- May 1880 – Licensed by U.P. Presbytery of Glasgow;
- Dec 1880 – Ordinated and inducted at Moffat U.P. Church;
- 1881-4 – Classical Examiner for Degrees at Glasgow University;
- Sep 1886 – Transferred to Glasgow Anderston U.P. Church;
- Oct 1889 – Transferred to Glasgow Claremount U.P. Church;
- May 1901 – Professor of Church history, New College, University of Edinburgh;
- Deputy Professor of Greek;
- Assistant Professor of Latin;
- 1912 – Lecturer in Church history, Westminster College, Vancouver, Canada;
- 1915 – Moderator of the General Assembly of the United Free Church of Scotland.

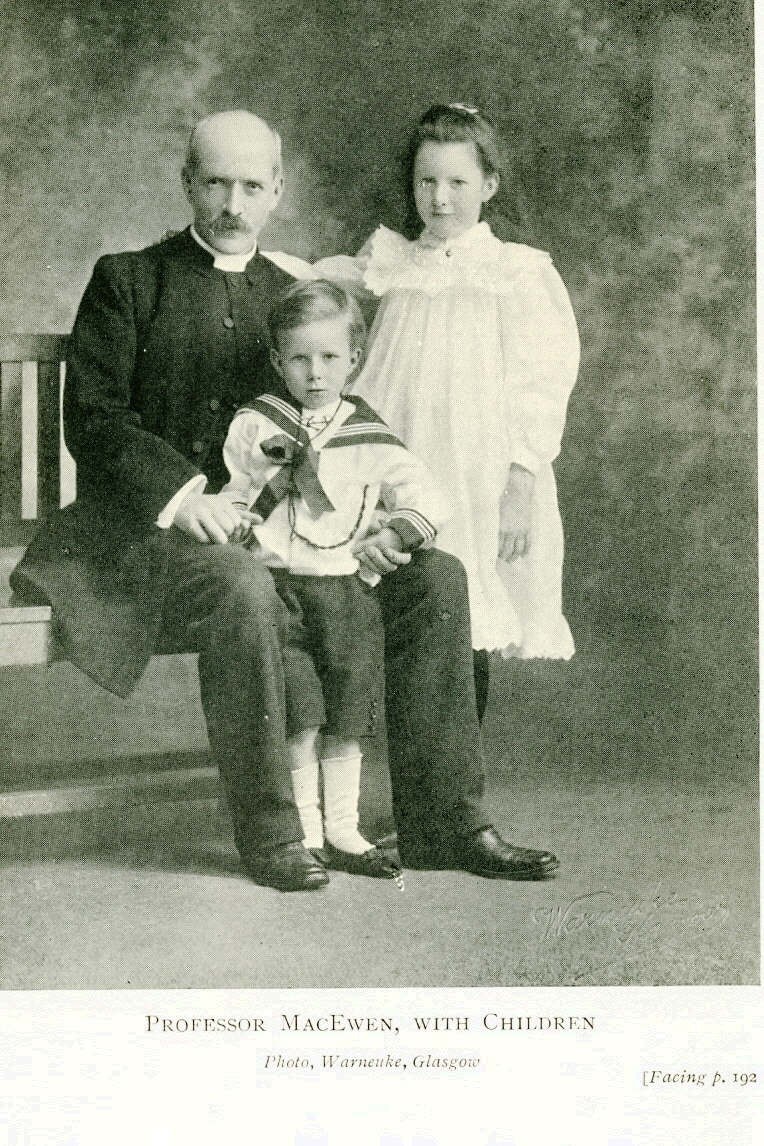
From his biography: Life and times of Alexander Robertson MacEwen, D.D

== Official appointments ==
- Chairman of Moffat School Board;
- Member of Glasgow School Board;
- Governor of Hutcheson's Schools;
- Secretary of Christian Unity Association;
- President of Scottish History Society;
- director of other trusts and societies; educational, charitable, and religious

== Publications ==
=== Classical ===
- The Origin and Growth of the Roman Satiric Poetry. [Arnold Prize]. Oxford: T. Shrimpton and Son, 1877.
- St Jerome, 1878;
- The Eastern Church in Greece, 1890;
- A History of the Church in Scotland. Vols. I, II. London: Hodder & Stoughton, 1913–1918.

=== Biographies ===
- Sermons by Alexander MacEwen D.D., (1822–1874); edited by his son, with a memoir. Glasgow: James MacLehose, 1877.
- Life and letters of John Cairns, D.D., LL.D. London: Hodder and Stoughton, 1895.
- The Erskines. (Ebenezer Erskine and Ralph Erskine). Edinburgh: Oliphant, Anderson and Ferrier, 1900, ("Famous Scots Series")
- Antoinette Bourignon, Quietist. London: Hodder and Stoughton, 1910.

=== Sermons and lectures ===
- The dangers of professional training: an address given to the Glasgow branch of the Educational Institute of Scotland on 16 November 1889. Glasgow : Robert Maclehose, 1889.
- The distress of nations : a sermon preached in Claremont Church, 17 January 1892, on the occasion of the death of H.R.H. the Duke of Clarence and Avondale. Glasgow : James MacLehose & Sons, 1892.
- A sermon on the death of the Right Hon. W.E. Gladstone: preached in Claremont Church on 22 May 1898. Glasgow : James MacLehose and Sons, 1898.
- A sermon on union with the Free Church: preached in Claremont Church on 25 September 1898. Glasgow: James MacLehose and Sons, 1899.
- The Province of Church History: introductory lecture delivered on 16 October 1901. Edinburgh: Macniven & Wallace, 1901.
- various articles and reviews

== Sources ==
- The Fasti of the United Free Church of Scotland, 1900–1929. Edited by the Rev. John Alexander Lamb. Edinburgh and London: Oliver & Boyd, 1956. p. 579.
- Who Was Who, A & C Black, 1920–2008; online edn, Oxford University Press, Dec 2007 MacEwen, Dr Alexander R., (1851–26 Nov. 1916), Moderator, General Assembly, United Free Church, 1915; Professor of Church History, New College, Edinburgh, since 1901
- A roll of the graduates of the University of Glasgow, from 1727 to 1897 : with short biographical notes / compiled by W. Innes Addison. Glasgow : MacLehose, 1898.University of Glasgow :: Story :: Biography of Alexander Robertson MacEwen
- Dean 2g Cemetery, Edinburgh, Lothian, Scotland indexed by Gravestone Photographic Resource Project
- David Smith Cairns (1862–1946),Life and times of Alexander Robertson MacEwen, D.D., Professor of Church History, New College, Edinburgh. London: Hodder and Stoughton, 1925.
- Glasgow University Library catalogue: University of Glasgow - MyGlasgow - Library - Specific search - Quicksearch
