= John Cairns =

John Cairns may refer to:

- John Cairns (biochemist) (1922–2018), biochemist who first demonstrated the structure and replication of the E. coli genome
- John Cairns (cricketer) (1925–2014), English cricketer
- John Cairns (politician) (1859–1923), British politician, MP for Morpeth
- John Cairns (1818–1892), Scottish divine and writer
- John Cairns (1857–1922), United Presbyterian Church minister, writer and biographer
- John Cairns (born 1942), former moderator of the general assembly of the Church of Scotland
- John Cairns (footballer) (1902–1965), Scottish football forward

== See also ==
- David Cairns (politician) (John David Cairns, 1966–2011), British politician, MP for Inverclyde
- John Cairnes (disambiguation)
