= George William Thomson Omond =

Scottish writer and historian

- Born: 13 September 1846; Craigentor, Crieff, Perthshire, U.K.
- Died: 18 June 1929 (aged 82); U.K.
- Occupations: Lawyer; advocate; writer; historian; biographer
- Spouse: Margaret Isabella Alice Wright
- Children: one son and three daughters
- Writing career
- Pen name: G.W.T. Omond
- Genres: Non-fiction, biography, history, Scottish law

George William Thomson Omond MA FRHistS (1846–1929) was a Scottish advocate and a prolific writer of history books.

== Life ==
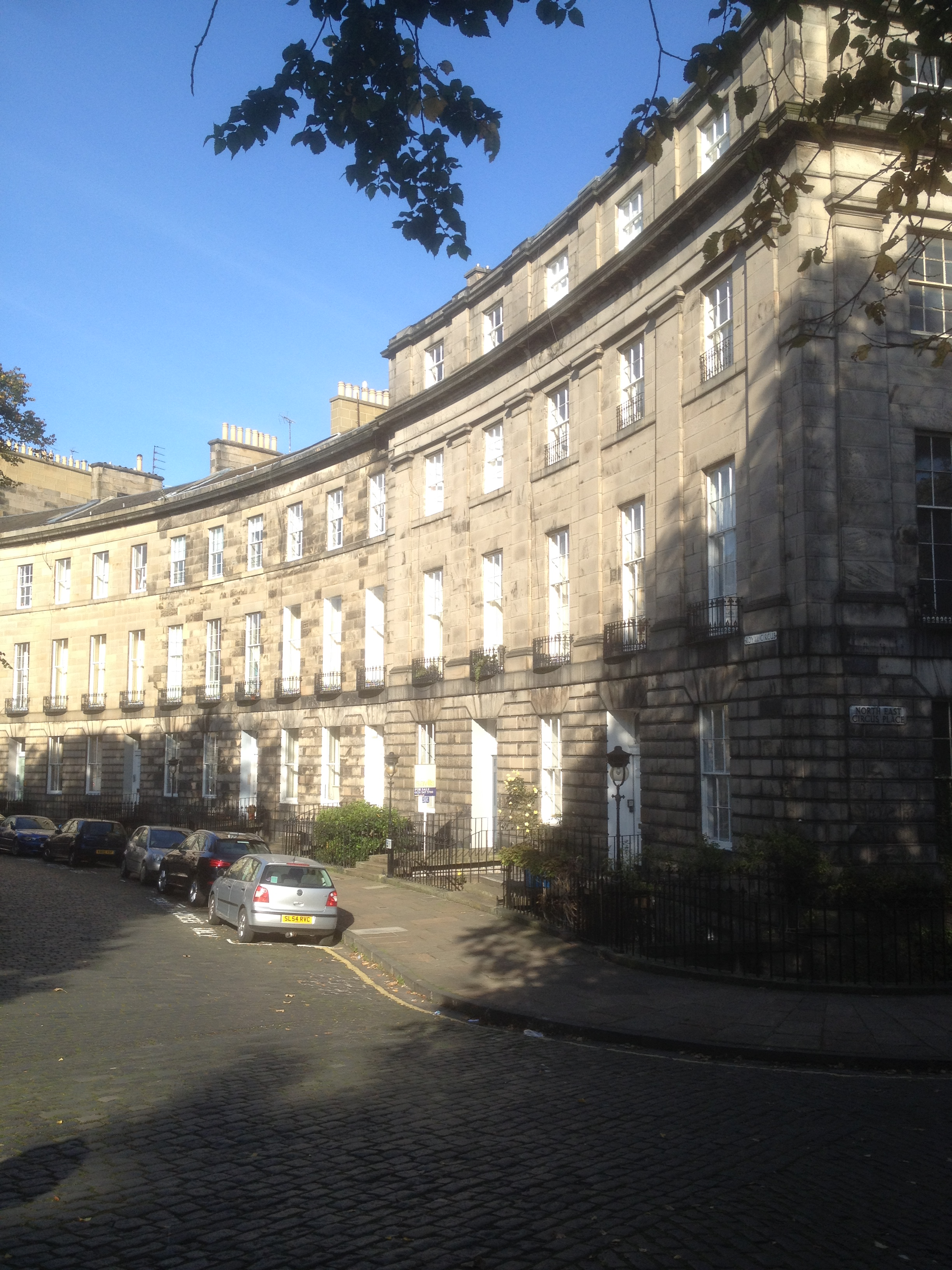
Royal Circus, Edinburgh

He was born at Craigentor, near Crieff, Perthshire on 13 September 1846. His father was the Rev. John Reid Omond (1804-1892) from Orkney, minister of the Free Church of Scotland at the parish of Monzie, Perthshire, and his mother Margaret Jane Thomson.

George was educated at Edinburgh Academy and the University of Edinburgh where he graduated in 1868 with first class honours in classics and second class in philosophy. He was a fellow of the Royal Historical Society and was created Chevalier de l’Ordre de la Couronne (Belgium) for his books on that country.

In Edinburgh he lived at 32 Royal Circus in the New Town.

He died on 18 June 1929.

== Family ==
He married Margaret Isabella Alice Wright on 23 July 1878 at Edinburgh, and they had one son and three daughters.

== Career ==
- 1871 - Called to the Scottish Bar as an advocate
- 1885 – Appointed Advocate Depute
- 1886 – Contested West Perthshire constituency in the general election of 1886. He stood as a Liberal Party candidate but was defeated by the standing Liberal Unionist Member of Parliament.

== Publications ==
- The Merchant Shipping Acts, 1854 to 1876. With notes, and index, and an appendix of relative statutes, etc, Edinburgh, 1877.
- The Lord Advocates of Scotland, from the Close of the Fifteenth Century to the Passing of the Reform Bill, Edinburgh: D. Douglas, 1883
- The Arniston Memoirs: Three Centuries of a Scottish House, 1571-1838, Edited from the family papers, Edinburgh: D. Douglas, 1887.
- Miserrima, [A novel], London: T. F. Unwin, 1895.
- The Story of Maurice Lestrange, Being an Account of His Travels and Adventures in Scotland during the Year 1765, London: A. & C. Black, 1896.
- The Barton House Conspiracy: a tale of 1886, Edinburgh: E. & S. Livingstone, [1896.]
- Fletcher of Saltoun, Edinburgh: Oliphant, Anderson and Ferrier, 1897, ("Famous Scots Series")
- The Early History of the Scottish Union Question, Edinburgh: Oliphant, Anderson and Ferrier, 1897.
- The Boers in Europe: A Sidelight on History, London: A. & C. Black, 1903.
- Bruges and West Flanders, painted by Amédée Forestier, London: A. & C. Black, 1906.
- Brabant and East Flanders, painted by Amédée Forestier, London: A. & C. Black, 1907.
- Liège and the Ardennes, painted by Amédée Forestier, London: A. & C. Black, [1908].
- Belgium, illustrated by Amédée Forestier, London: A. & C. Black, Series: Peeps at Many Lands, 1908.
- The Lord Advocates of Scotland. Second series, 1834-1880, London: Andrew Melrose, 1914.
- The Law of the Sea: A Short History of Some Questions Relating to Neutral Merchant Shipping, 1756-1916, London: A. & C. Black, 1916.
- The Wielingen dispute through British eyes, 1920.
- 'The Scheldt and the Wielingen', in Transactions of the Grotius Society, Vol. 6, Problems of Peace and War, Papers Read before the Society in the Year 1920, pp. 80–88.
- Belgium and Luxembourg, [with maps], London: Hodder & Stoughton, 1923, Series: Nations of Today.

== Sources ==
- Who Was Who, A & C Black, 1920–2008; online edn, Oxford University Press, Dec 2007 http://www.ukwhoswho.com/view/article/oupww/whowaswho/U214964
- www.bl.uk
- www.openlibrary.org
- www.worldcat.org
