= Alexander Balloch Grosart =

Scottish clergyman and literary editor (1827–1899)

Alexander Balloch Grosart (18 June 1827 – 16 March 1899) was a Scottish clergyman and literary editor. He is chiefly remembered for reprinting much rare Elizabethan literature, a work which he undertook because of his interest in Puritan theology.

== Life ==
The son of a building contractor, he was born at Stirling and educated at the University of Edinburgh. In 1856 he became a minister of the United Presbyterian Church of Scotland at Kinross, serving the congregation known as First United Presbyterian Church. In 1865 he went to Liverpool, and three years later to Blackburn.

He resigned from the ministry in 1892, and died at Dublin.

== Editorial work ==
Among the first writers whose works he edited were the Puritan writers Richard Sibbes, Thomas Brooks and Herbert Palmer. Editions of Michael Bruce's Poems (1865) and Richard Gilpin's Demonologia sacra (1867) followed. In 1868 he brought out a bibliography of the writings of Richard Baxter, and from that year until 1876 he was occupied in reproducing for private subscribers the “Fuller Worthies Library,” a series of thirty-nine volumes which included the works of Thomas Fuller, Sir John Davies, Fulke Greville, Edward de Vere, Henry Vaughan, Andrew Marvell, George Herbert, Richard Crashaw, John Donne and Sir Philip Sidney. The last four volumes of the series were devoted to the works of many little known and otherwise inaccessible authors. He also wrote a biography of the Scottish poet Robert Fergusson (Edinburgh: Oliphant, Anderson and Ferrier, 1898) in the “Famous Scots Series”.

His Occasional Issues of Unique and Very Rare Books (1875–1881) included among other things the Annalia Dubrensia of Robert Dover. In 1876 still another series, known as the “Chertsey Worthies Library,” was begun. It included editions of the works of Nicholas Breton, Francis Quarles, Dr Joseph Beaumont, Abraham Cowley, Henry More, and John Davies of Hereford.

The two last-named series were being produced simultaneously until 1881, and no sooner had they been completed than Grosart began the “Huth Library,” so called from the bibliophile Henry Huth, who possessed the originals of many of the reprints. It included the works of Robert Greene, Thomas Nashe, and Gabriel Harvey, as well as the prose tracts of Thomas Dekker. He also edited the complete works of Edmund Spenser and Samuel Daniel. From the Townley Hall collection he reprinted several manuscripts and edited Sir John Eliot's works, Sir Richard Boyle's Lismore Papers, and various publications for the Chetham Society, the Camden Society and the Roxburghe Club.

=== Religious works ===
- Jesus 'mighty to save': Isaiah lxiii.1 or, Christ for all the world, and all the world for Christ (1863)
- The Prince of Light and the Prince of Darkness in Conflict (1864)
- Joining the Church, Or, Materials for Conversations Between a Minister and Intending Communicant (1865)
- The Lambs All Safe: Or, the Salvation of Children (1865)

== See also ==
- Thomas Traherne
