= Eve Blantyre Simpson =

Scottish writer

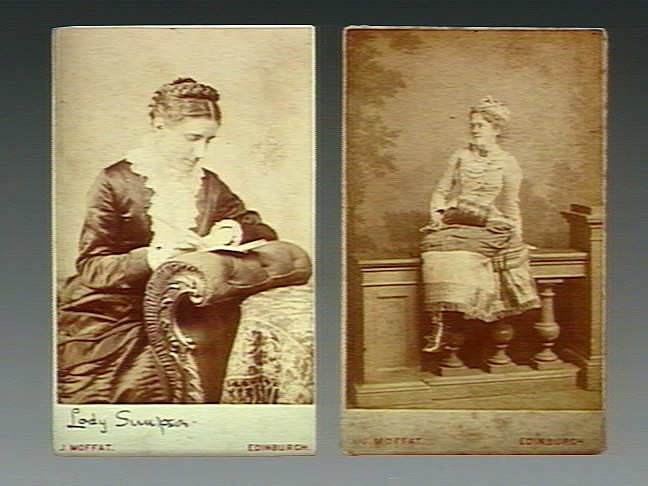
- Photographs of Eve Blantyre Simpson in the Wellcome Library collection.
- Born: 15 December 1855; Edinburgh, Scotland
- Died: 23 January 1920 (aged 64); Edinburgh, Scotland
- Occupations: Writer; historian; biographer
- Writing career
- Genres: Biography, folklore

Eve Blantyre Simpson (15 December 1855 – 23 January 1920), sometimes credited as Evelyn Blantyre Simpson, Eva Blantyre Simpson, or E. Blantyre Simpson, was a Scottish writer, author of biographies, short stories, a book about dogs, and a book on the folklore of lowland Scotland.

== Early life ==
Eve Blantyre Simpson was born in Edinburgh, one of the nine children of professor James Young Simpson (1811–1870) and Janet "Jessie" Grindlay Simpson (1812–1870). She was still a girl when both parents died, within a few weeks of each other, in 1870. Her father, an obstetrician, popularised the use of chloroform as an anaesthetic.

== Career ==
Simpson wrote biographies of her father and two of her brother Walter's friend, Robert Louis Stevenson, one a study of his early life, and one a shorter work, "a flashlight biography, a nutshell appreciation." She also wrote a "readable, if not authoritative" book on folklore in Scotland, including the tradition of Beltane, lore about fairies, and fishermen's superstitions. Of her book Nelson and Puck: Dogs of Other Days (1882), one London reviewer predicted that it "will no doubt be duly appreciated by those for whom it is intended, but cannot be of the slightest interest to others." She also wrote short stories and articles, often about dogs, for periodicals and newspapers.

Simpson toured as an author in the United States and Canada in 1899, and was described as "a devoted bicyclist" and "animated and witty".

== Personal life ==
Simpson died from liver cancer on 23 January 1920 at Edinburgh, aged 64 years. She was the last surviving member of her father's large family.

== Published books ==
- Nelson and Puck: Dogs of Other Days, Edinburgh: Blackwood & Sons, 1882.
- Sir James Y. Simpson, Edinburgh: Oliphant, Anderson and Ferrier, 1896, ("Famous Scots Series")
- Robert Louis Stevenson's Edinburgh Days, London: Hodder & Stoughton, 1898.
- Robert Louis Stevenson, Edinburgh: T. N. Foulis, 1905. "Spirit of the Age Series", no. 2.
- Folk Lore in Lowland Scotland, London: J.M. Dent, 1908.
- The Robert Louis Stevenson Originals, London & Edinburgh: T. N. Foulis, 1912.
