= William Henry Oliphant Smeaton =

- Born: 24 October 1856; Aberdeen, Scotland, UK
- Died: 31 March 1914 (aged 57); Edinburgh, Scotland, UK
- Occupations: Writer, journalist, editor, historian, educator
- Writing career
- Pen name: Oliphant Smeaton
- Genres: Fiction, adventure fiction, children's fiction, non-fiction, travel literature

William Henry Oliphant Smeaton (24 October 1856 – 31 March 1914), sometimes using the pen name Oliphant Smeaton, was a Scottish writer, journalist, editor, historian and educator. He was popularly known for his writing on Australian life and literature for various British publications as well as for his adventure and children's fiction novels during the 1890s. Later in his career, Smeaton also published books on Scottish antiquities and edited English literary text, ballads and collections of verse and prose. His best known work, The Life and Works of William Shakespeare (1911), was especially successful and enjoyed several reprints. He also contributed several biographies for the "Famous Scots Series" published by Oliphant, Anderson and Ferrier.

== Biography ==
William Smeaton was born in Aberdeen, Scotland on 24 October 1856, the youngest son of a clergyman and university professor. He was educated at Edinburgh University and intended to enter the clergy himself but abandoned his religious studies for personal reasons. He left for New Zealand in 1878 where he taught school for several years. Smeaton then travelled to Australia where he spent ten years as a journalist before finally returning to Britain in 1893. Moving to Edinburgh, he began writing about Australian life and literature for various publications in Victorian Britain, including a multi-volume effort popularly known as the "Famous Scots Series". He also began writing several adventure and children's fiction novels such as By Adverse Winds (1895), Our Laddie (1897) and A Mystery of the Pacific (1899).

Smeaton became associated with the Dent publishing firm during this time and worked with JM Dent on the editorial work for the Temple Classics and the Everyman Library series. In addition, he also edited books on Scottish antiquities and English literature including works by William Shakespeare, Thomas Dekker, John Ford and others. His The Life and Works of William Shakespeare (1911) was especially popular and was reprinted several times. He edited The World's Epoch-Makers series for the T. & T. Clark publishing firm.

He died in Edinburgh on 31 March 1914.

== Bibliography ==
- By Adverse Winds (1895)
- Allan Ramsay (1896) ("Famous Scots Series")
- Our Laddie (1897)
- Tobias Smollett (1897) ("Famous Scots Series")
- Treasure Cave of the Blue Mountains (1899)
- A Mystery of the Pacific (1899)
- William Dunbar (1898) ("Famous Scots Series")
- English Satires and Satirists (1899)
- Thomas Guthrie (1900) ("Famous Scots Series")
- The Medici and the Italian Renaissance (1901)
- Edinburgh and its Story (1904)
- The Life and Works of William Shakespeare (1911)
