= Alexander Taylor Innes =

Scottish lawyer, writer, biographer and church historian

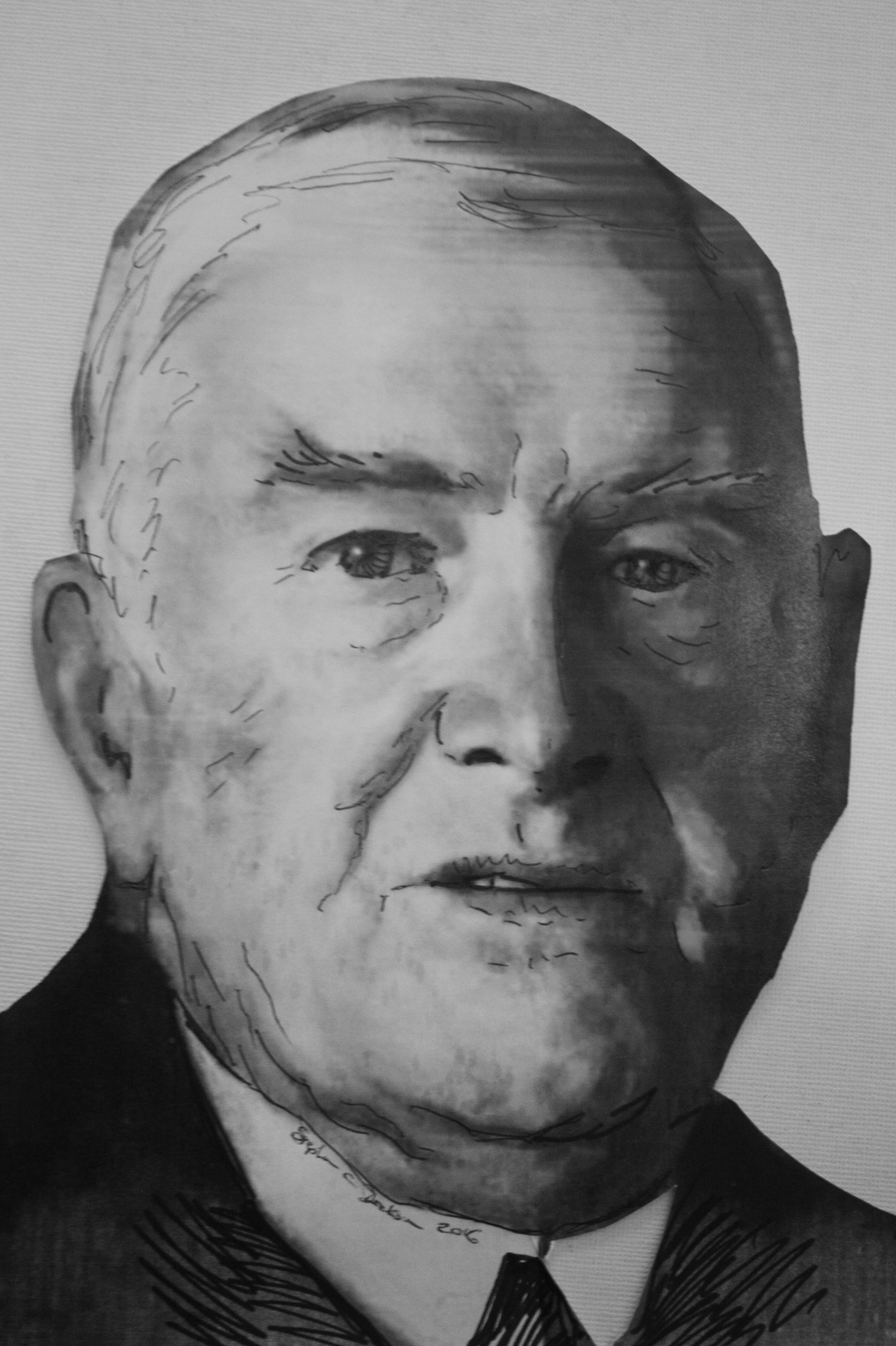
- Born: 18 December 1833; Tain, Ross and Cromarty, Scotland, UK
- Died: 27 January 1912 (aged 78); Edinburgh, Scotland
- Occupations: Writer; lawyer; church historian; biographer
- Spouse: Sophia Fordyce
- Writing career
- Pen name: A. Taylor Innes
- Genres: Non-fiction, biography, church history

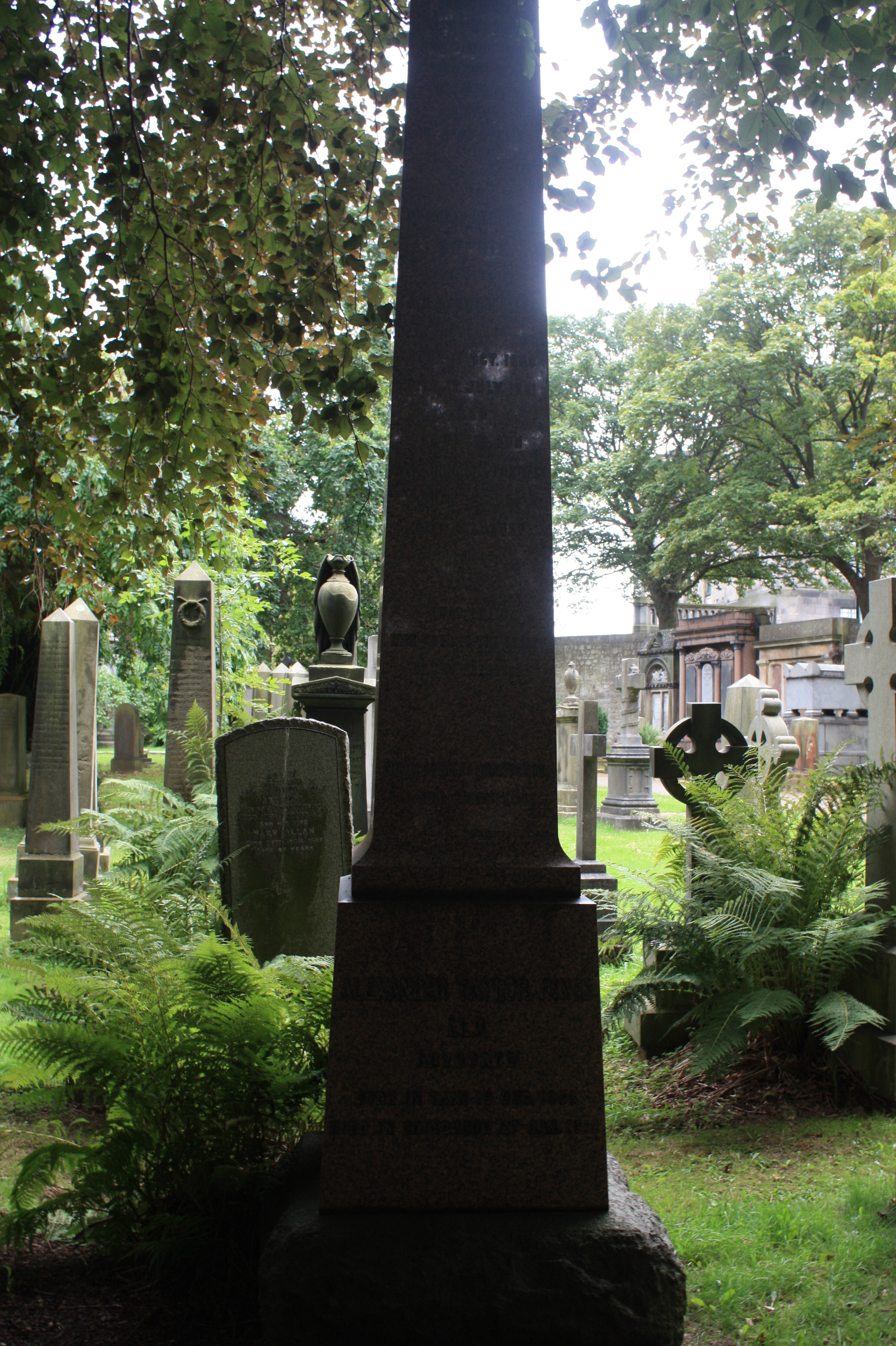
The grave of Alexander Taylor Innes, Dean Cemetery

Alexander Taylor Innes FRSE LLD (18 December 1833 – 27 January 1912), was a lawyer, writer, biographer and church historian. In authorship he is usually abbreviated as A.T.I.

== Life ==
He was born on 18 December 1833 at Tain, Ross and Cromarty. His father was Alexander Innes, an accountant and bank agent, and his mother, Martha Taylor. He was educated at Tain Royal Academy and from 1848 to 1852 at the University of Edinburgh, where he graduated MA. Taylor Innes entered the legal profession although he originally intended to study theology and become a minister. His scruples about accepting the Westminster Confession of Faith prevented him from doing so although he remained within the Free Church communion. He contributed to articles on a religious theme to various journals, and his interest in the legal aspects of church creeds and traditions led to the publication of his pioneering work, The Law of Creeds in Scotland, in 1867. He corresponded with W. E. Gladstone on the subject of the disestablishment of the Scottish Church and visited him in May 1868. He also wrote a scholarly paper called "Gladstone in Transition" in which he defended Gladstone's views, and for which he received the latter's appreciation. In 1881, Taylor Innes was appointed Advocate Depute under Gladstone's second government (1880–1885) and was reappointed under the subsequent Gladstone (1892–94) and Rosebery (1894–95) governments. In later life he withdrew from active legal practice to concentrate on ecclesiastical issues, where perhaps his historical significance lies.

In 1880, he married Sophia Dingwall Fordyce, daughter of Alexander D. Fordyce, a landowner and Liberal MP. She died less than a year later.

In 1906 he was elected a Fellow of the Royal Society of Edinburgh. His proposers were John McLaren, Lord McLaren, John Horne, John Rankine and John Sutherland Black.

In later life he lived at 48 Morningside Park in south-west Edinburgh. He died in Edinburgh on 27 January 1912 and was buried in Dean Cemetery, Edinburgh.

The tall pink granite obelisk marking his grave lies at the west end of the main east-west path under the trees opposite the pyramid to Rutherfurd.

== Legal career ==
- 1852–1854 – Legal training in a law office in Tain, Ross-shire.
- 1854–1857 – Completed his law apprenticeship in Edinburgh.
- 1857–1869 – Legal practice in Edinburgh and Glasgow.
- 1870 – Called to the Scottish bar.

== Publications ==
- College Years: the valedictory address of the Dialectic Society of the University of Edinburgh for session 1856/57, by A. T. I., Edinburgh, 1857.
- The Law of Creeds in Scotland: A Treatise on the Legal Relation of Churches in Scotland Established and not Established, to their Doctrinal Confessions, Edinburgh & London: William Blackwood & Sons, 1867;
- The Church of Scotland Crisis 1843 and 1874: and the Duke of Argyll, Edinburgh: Maclaren & Macniven, 1874.
- The Scotch Law of Establishment, an answer to the two new positions of the Duke of Argyll, Edinburgh: 1875
- Letters from the Red Beech. Six Letters from a Layman [i.e. Alexander Taylor Innes] to a Minister of the Free Church of Scotland on the Canon, the Pulpit, and Criticism, Edinburgh: John Maclaren & Son, 1880.
- The Assembly of 1881 and the case of Professor Robertson Smith, Edinburgh: J. Maclaren & Son, 1881.
- The Confidence of the Church. A letter to Sir Henry W. Moncreiff, Bart., D.D., Edinburgh: J. Maclaren & Son, 1881.
- Samuel Rutherford, Edinburgh: Macniven and Wallace, 1883.
- Open Teaching in the Universities of Scotland, Edinburgh: D. Douglas, 1885.
- Church and State, a Historical Handbook, Edinburgh: T. & T. Clark, 38 George Street, 1890.
- "Hypnotism in Relation to Crime and the Medical Faculty", The Contemporary Review, Vol.58, No.4, (October 1890), pp. 555-566.
- Studies in Scottish History, chiefly Ecclesiastical, London: Hodder and Stoughton, 1892.
- John Knox, Edinburgh: Oliphant, Anderson and Ferrier, May 1896, ("Famous Scots Series").
- Trial of Jesus Christ: A legal monograph, Edinburgh: T. & T. Clark, 1899.
- The Law of Creeds in Scotland: a treatise on the relations of churches in Scotland, established and not established, to the civil law, Edinburgh & London: William Blackwood & Sons, 1902.
- Scottish Churches and the Crisis of 1907, London: Hodder & Stoughton, 1907.
- Chapters of Reminiscence, London: Hodder & Stoughton, 1913.

== Sources ==
- "Innes, Alexander Taylor (1833–1912), lawyer and church historian | Oxford Dictionary of National Biography". Oxford Dictionary of National Biography (online ed.). Oxford University Press. 2004. doi:10.1093/ref:odnb/41289. (Subscription, Wikipedia Library access or UK public library membership required.)
- "The British Library - The British Library". bl.uk.
- "Welcome to Open Library". Open Library.
