= John C. Smith =

John C. Smith may refer to:

- John C. Smith (politician) (1832–1910), American politician
- John Campbell Smith (1828–1914), Scottish writer
- John Carraway Smith (ca. 1819–1868), American military officer
- John Chaloner Smith (1827–1895), Irish engineer
- John Christopher Smith (1712–1795), English composer
- John Cotton Smith (1765–1845), American lawyer
- John Cyril Smith (1922–2003), British legal scholar
- John C. Smith (war correspondent), see New York Herald Tribune
