= Margaret Black =

Margaret Black is the name of:

- Margaret Moyes Black (1855–1920), Scottish novelist
- Maggie Black (1930–2015), American ballet teacher

== See also ==
- Jill Black (Jill Margaret Black, born 1954), British jurist
