= Agnes Grainger Stewart =

Scottish writer (1871–1956)

Agnes Grainger Stewart (26 April 1871 – 25 September 1956) was a Scottish writer.

== Life ==
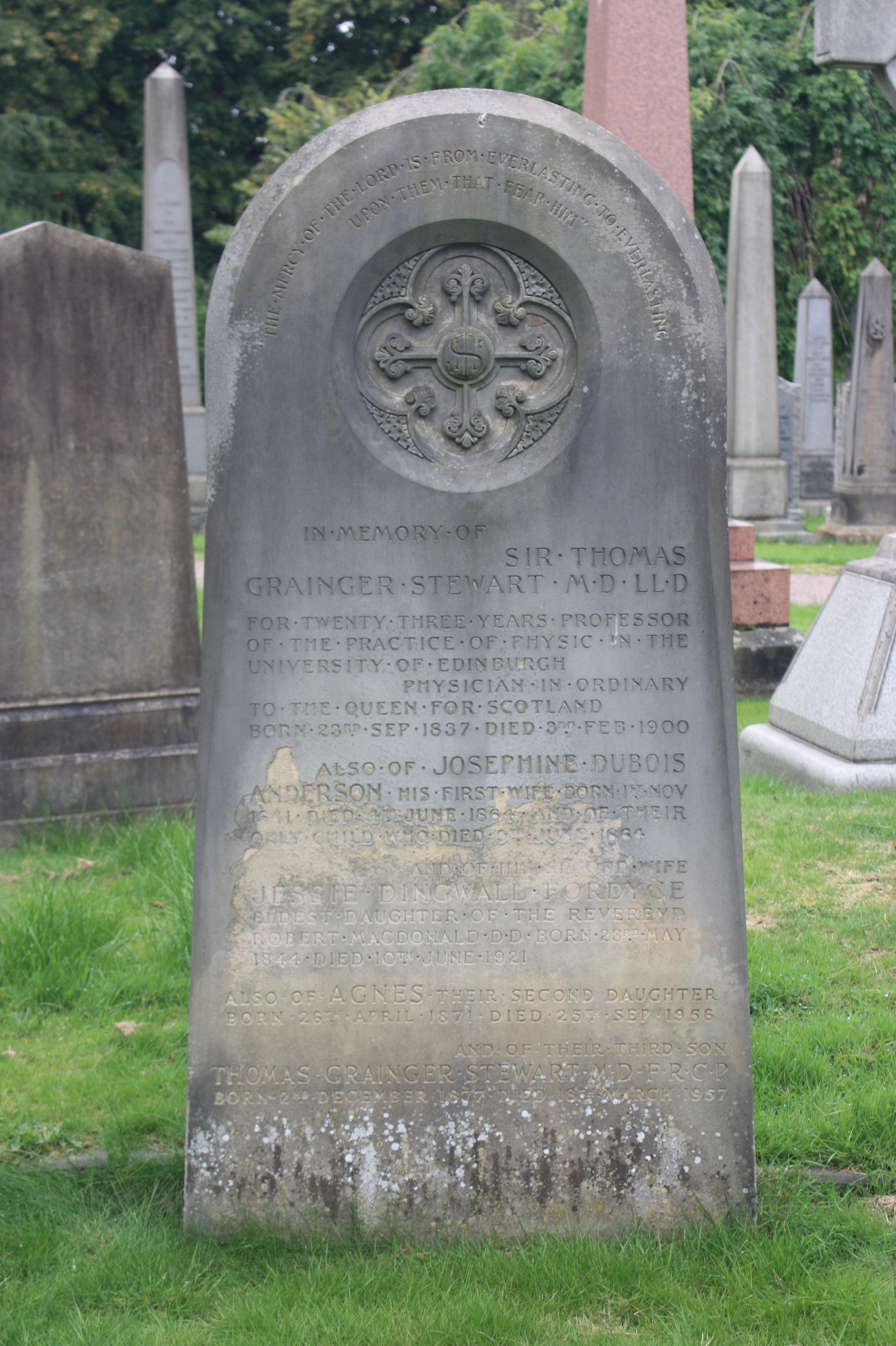
Agnes Grainger Stewart's grave, Dean Cemetery

She was born in Edinburgh, Scotland, on 26 April 1871. Her father was Sir Thomas Grainger Stewart, an eminent physician, and her mother was Jessy Dingwall Fordyce McDonald. They lived at 32 Queen Street in Edinburgh's First New Town.

Her only published work appears to be The Academic Gregories (1901). The Gregories dealt with in this book include: John Gregory, James Gregory, William Gregory, etc. In all, the book outlines the lives of twelve Gregories from 1638 to 1858. Otherwise she seems to have led a sheltered life, presumably in charge of the Stewart household: later at 19 Charlotte Square in Edinburgh.

Her mother Lady Grainger Stewart died on 10 June 1921, at Glendee Cottage, West Cults, which was the home of her daughter Agnes Grainger Stewart. At this time, Agnes Grainger Stewart is noted as being the Lady Warden of Aberdeen Training Centre for Teachers.

She died in Edinburgh on 25 September 1956, aged 85. She is buried with her parents in Dean Cemetery.

== Selected works ==
- The Academic Gregories, Edinburgh: Oliphant, Anderson and Ferrier, 1901, ("Famous Scots Series")
