= Louis Auguste Barbé =

French biographer (1845–1926)

Louis A. Barbé (1845 – 1926) was born in France and came to Glasgow as a French teacher. He settled in Scotland and wrote innumerable books on Scottish history and biography. He was born on 15 November 1845, son of Charles Barbé, Commissaire de Marine, Cherbourg. His mother was Desirée Barbé, née Javelot. He was educated in France and began his teaching career as Professor of English at the College Jean-Bart, Dunkerque. For six years he was tutor to the Princes of Schaumburg-Lippe. In 1880, he married Alice Rosa Allen, who was the daughter of John George Allen of Guernsey. He moved to Glasgow in 1884 and was head of the Modern Languages department at the Glasgow Academy from 1884 to 1918. He was employed as a reviewer with the Glasgow Herald from 1887 to 1926 and joined the Institute of Journalists in 1893. He acted as an examiner in French at the University of Edinburgh from 1901 and in Modern Languages at the Faculty of Advocates in Edinburgh. His books are remarkably well-written and show no obvious French influence. He died on 10 September 1926 at Dunbar, East Lothian.

== Some published works ==
- Pélerinages à Notre-Dame de Lourdes. Guérison de Mademoiselle Marie Poirer, de Saint-Aubin de Terregate, etc, Paris, 1875.
- The Tragedy of Gowrie House; an Historical Study, Paisley and London: Alexander Gardner, 1887.
- A Third French Reader and Writer, London: S. Sonnenschein & Co., 1893.
- Kirkcaldy of Grange, Edinburgh: Oliphant, Anderson and Ferrier, Oct 1897, ("Famous Scots Series")
- Viscount Dundee, Edinburgh: Oliphant, Anderson and Ferrier, 1903, ("Famous Scots Series")
- The Bass Rock and its Story, Glasgow & Edinburgh: William Hodge & Co, 1904.
- Longer Poems for Recitation, London : Blackie & Son, 1905. Blackie's little French classics.
- Histoire d'Aladdin, (Edited by L.A.Barbé) Blackie & Son, 1906. Blackie's Modern Language Series.
- A Book of French Songs, Phonetic Edition, London : Blackie & Son, 1910. Blackie's little French Classics.
- Bannockburn. A Poem for Recitation, London : Blackie & Son, 1910.
- In Byways of Scottish History, London [etc.], Blackie & Son; New York, Scribner, 1912.
- Margaret of Scotland and the Dauphin Louis: an Historical Study, based mainly on original documents preserved in the Bibliothèque Nationale, London: Blackie & Son, 1917.
- Sidelights on the History, Industries & Social Life of Scotland, London: Blackie & Son, 1919.
- Épisodes Mémorables de l’Histoire de France, (General editor: Louis A. Barbé), Blackie & Son, 1919–20.

== Sources ==
- http://www.scoop-database.com/bio/barbe_louis_a
- Death certificate available on the Scotland's People website
