= Technical and Vocational Education Initiative =

The Technical and Vocational Education Initiative (TVEI) was an initiative in education in the United Kingdom in the 1980s

== Description ==
According to the UK Government's National Audit Office: "The Technical and Vocational Education Initiative (TVEI) is designed to encourage 14-18 year olds to obtain qualifications and skills needed for work. It provides, initially on a pilot basis, full-time, integrated, four-year courses of general, technical and vocational education covering the whole curriculum. The Manpower Services Commission are responsible for developing and funding TVEI, but courses are provided in schools through local education authorities so that individual projects meet local needs."(National Audit Office, 1985),

TVEI was announced in 1982 and a pilot scheme started in 1983. TVEI was extended nationally in 1987 , and was thereafter often known as TVEI extension, sometimes abbreviated TVEE. It ended in 1997

== Management ==
It was the first major intervention by central government in curriculum development in England and unusually, the initiative was not given to the Ministry of Education to run but to a government agency responsible for workforce planning - the Department of Employment and Manpower Services Commission. The MSC worked on a one to one basis with local authorities, with each local authority able to develop and implement plans relevant to their area. Computers were revolutionising the workplace and providing new opportunities for employment as well as requiring new skills and attitudes in the workforce and in society. The BBC and the UK Government developed the BBC micro computer for the schools sector and TVEI supported the channelling of funds and training into the schools sector to enable computer rooms, equipped by BBCs to be set up in schools. Prior to this, typically, the mathematics department might have had access to one computer at a remote location.

The TVEI initiative supported curriculum and assessment innovation and development and provided the catalyst for the subjects of woodwork and metal work to be replaced by design and technology and art and design (computer-aided). Home Economics as a subject was transformed to become Food Technology.

The strategy for the implementation of TVEI provides an example of positive change management in an education system with government engaging with educators and industry to support innovation and development in uncertain times. It can be argued that this investment which led to pupils having access to the latest technology, a supported creative curriculum and an encouragement with experimentation, had a seminal role in providing the foundations for the successful UK animation industry.

== Projects ==
The direct engagement of teachers in this curriculum development led to innovations which were to have impact on the lives of millions of young people. Spin off developments included, from TVEI in the north-east of England, the establishment of Centre for Evaluation and Monitoring led by Professor Carol Fitzgibbon working on TVEI Professor Peter Tymms (initially a TVEI teacher) which now provides baseline tests used internationally, across the age range, used for measuring pupil progress (ALIS, MIDYIS etc). Millions of children have taken these assessments. The knowledge and skills gained by local authority staff through TVEI in Bedfordshire stimulated the spin off development of SIMS (Schools Information Management Systems) which was later bought out by CAPITA and provides schools’ information management systems widely used in the English schools sector..

The history of this period is recorded in publications by several UK organisations - the Association for IT in Teacher Education (Hammond et al. 2011), the Mirandanet initiative. The ITTE Voices project provides a record of educators experiences in this period.

Evaluation of the TVEI initiative was obligatory. In the London Borough of Enfield, the evaluation strategy was to use teacher-researchers based in schools (Leask, 1998), following Lawrence Stenhouse's effective teacher-research model used for the evaluation of the Humanities Curriculum Project. Professor Helen Simons, a colleague of Stenhouse, set up the Enfield model, later managed by Professor David Hopkins at what was the Cambridge Institute of Education. Hopkins, 1989, includes a section explaining the system. Teacher Researchers were trained and gathered data in schools on agreed topics using agreed methodologies. The data were then anonymised and reported giving schools a basis for comparison with their peers. The archive of the Enfield Teacher Researcher approach is held by Professor Marilyn Leask, De Montfort University, UK.

MirandaNet established 1992, specialises in education/industry collaboration and with industry hosted seminars for educators where forthcoming technologies were showcased for educators. Many leading IT companies appointed education staff to support strong education/industry partnerships. The UK Austerity Period fuelled by the international banking crises of the early 21st century, curbed UK industry investment in educational innovation.

A Museum of Educational Computing holding programmes and equipment from this period to more recent times is in the care of Dr Richard Millwood deputy and researcher and developer at what at the time was a leading innovation unit - Ultralab (closed around 2008), Anglia Ruskin University, UK. A National Museum of Computing at Bletchley Park has more general information about the development of computing.

== Sources ==
Gleeson, Denis & McLean, Monica (1994) Whatever happened to TVEI?: TVEI, curriculum and schooling, Journal of Education Policy, 9:3, 233-244, DOI: 10.1080/0268093940090304

Hammond, M. el al (2011) Voices, The Association for IT in Teacher Education

Hansard (1987) TVEI Grants. UK Parliament

Hopkins, David (1989) Evaluation for School Development, Milton Keynes, Open University

Leask, Marilyn Marilyn Leask (1988) Reliability and validity of teacher-evaluator approach to project evaluation MPhil thesis, Cambridge Institute of Education UK. Now available from the University of Cambridge library and on Open Repository

Williams, E. (1995) Can there be life after TVEI? Times Educational Supplement

Yeomans, David Constructing vocational education: from TVEI to GNVQ. University of Leeds Post 14 Research Group
