= John Wellwood =

Scottish poet, writer, biographer and minister

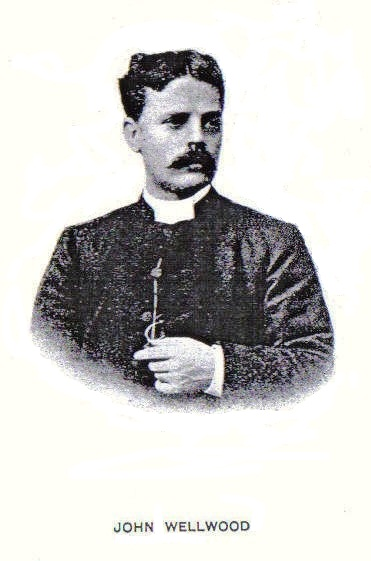
- Born: 18 December 1853; Glasgow, Scotland, U.K.
- Died: 7 February 1919 (aged 65); Edinburgh, Scotland, U.K.
- Occupations: Poet; writer; biographer; minister of the Church of Scotland
- Spouse: Isabella Herkless
- Children: Five sons and two daughters
- Writing career
- Genres: Non-fiction, biography, poetry, religion

John Wellwood (1853–1919) was a poet, writer, biographer and minister of the Church of Scotland. He was born at George Street, Glasgow on 18 December 1853. His father was John Wellwood, a commission agent, and his mother was Margaret Thomson. He was educated at Annfield School, Bridgeton, Glasgow and at the University of Glasgow. He chose the Church of Scotland instead of the United Presbyterian Church of which his parents were members, mainly because it "offered more scope for freedom and breadth of thought." After he was licensed by the Presbytery of Glasgow, he served as an assistant Minister at Auchterderran, at Glasgow Cathedral, and at Campbeltown. He was ordained on 5 April 1883 and immediately became minister in the parish of Drainie in the Presbytery of Elgin. Besides poetry, his interests included Liberal politics and musical composition and he composed several hymn tunes. On 26 April 1883, he married Isabella Herkless, the only daughter of William Herkless, Glasgow and the sister of Sir John Herkless, Principal of St. Andrews University. They had five sons and two daughters. Two of their sons were officers in Scottish regiments who died in action during the 1914-18 War. Wellwood remained Minister at Drainie till his death on 7 February 1919. The untimely death of his two sons contributed to his demise.

== Publications ==
- The Praise and Blame of Love, With Other Verses, [with Robert Kemp, Minister of Blairgowrie], Glasgow: Wilson & McCormick, 1882, second edition, 1885.
- Norman Macleod, Edinburgh: Oliphant, Anderson and Ferrier, 1897, ("Famous Scots Series")
- Memoir of A.H. Fairley in Prayers, (1897).
- Memoir of James Slater in Seaside Idylls, (Elgin, 1898).
- Contributions [stories, etc.] to Cornhill Magazine and others.
- Poems [edited by Rev. John R. Duncan], Elgin, 1920. (with memoir and portrait).
- The "Borough" Guide to Lossiemouth, etc., Cheltenham: Edward J. Burrow, [1919.]

== Sources ==
- Fasti Ecclesiae Scoticanae: the Succession of Ministers in the Church of Scotland from the Reformation, ed. By Hew Scott, D.D., Volume VI, The Synods of Aberdeen and Moray, Edinburgh: Oliver and Boyd, 1926.
- Memoir by Rev. John R. Duncan, Minister of St. Andrews-Llanbryd (Morayshire) in Poems by John Wellwood, Elgin: W. R. Walker & Co., 1920. His photograph is on the frontispiece of that book.
- British Library catalogue at www.bl.uk.
