= William Morison (minister) =

Scottish Presbyterian minister (1843–1937)

- Born: 6 December 1843; Moffat, Dumfries and Galloway, Scotland, U.K.
- Died: 9 March 1937 (aged 93); Edinburgh, Scotland, U.K.
- Occupations: Writer; biographer; minister
- Spouse: Annie Douglas
- Children: three daughters
- Writing career
- Genres: Non-fiction, biography, history

William Morison (6 December 1843 – 9 March 1937) was a Scottish presbyterian minister, writer and biographer. He was born in Moffat, Dumfries and Galloway. His father was Alexander Moffat, a master builder. and his mother was Catherine Campbell. He was educated at Moffat Academy, the University of Edinburgh where he graduated M.A. in 1862, and at the United Presbyterian College, Edinburgh. He married Anne Primrose Douglas on 24 March 1869. They had three daughters – Annie, Catherine and Helen. He died on 9 March 1937 at his home at Corstorphine, Edinburgh.

== Career as minister ==
- 1863 – Licensed by U. P. Presbytery of Annandale, Scottish Borders.
- 1882-3 – Assistant at Dumbarton Bridgend
- 1883-4 – Assistant at Dumfries Buccleuch Street
- 29 Apr 1868 – Ordained and inducted as Minister at Leeds U. P. Church.
- 6 Sep 1870 – Transferred to Pendleton.
- 26 June 1877 – Transferred to Leith St. Andrews.
- 28 Dec 1880 – Transferred to and inducted at Rosehall, Edinburgh.
- 1914 – Retired from ministry.

== Publications ==
- Andrew Melville. Edinburgh: Oliphant, Anderson and Ferrier, 1899, ("Famous Scots Series")
- Johnston of Warriston. Edinburgh: Oliphant, Anderson and Ferrier, 1901, ("Famous Scots Series")
- Milton and Liberty. Edinburgh & London: William Green and Sons, 1909

== Sources ==
- The Fasti of the United Free Church of Scotland, 1900-1929. Edited by the Rev. John Alexander Lamb. Edinburgh and London: Oliver & Boyd, 1956. p. 26.
- Scotlandspeople internet site: www.scotlandspeople.gov.uk.
- www.ancestry.com
