= James Hadden =

James Hadden may refer to:

- James Cuthbert Hadden (1861–1914), Scottish author, journalist, biographer and organist
- James Murray Hadden (1757–1817), British Army officer
