= Thomas Banks Maclachlan =

British writer

- Born: 1 January 1865; Glasgow, Scotland, U.K.
- Died: 13 April 1952 (aged 87); Camperdown, Victoria, Australia
- Occupations: Writer; journalist; biographer
- Spouse: Jessie Gilchrist Dunlop
- Writing career
- Pen name: T. Banks Maclachlan
- Genres: Non-fiction, biography, journalism

T. Banks Maclachlan (1865–1952) was born in Glasgow in 1865. His father was John Maclachlan, a clothier, and his mother was Agnes Jameson. He was educated at George Watson's College, Glasgow, and at Edinburgh University, where he attended Professor David Masson's English Literature class. He joined the Institute of Journalists in 1890. He married Jessie Gilchrist Dunlop on 21 July 1893 at Edinburgh, and apparently emigrated with his 81-year-old wife to Australia in February 1949. He died on 13 April 1952. His wife Jesse Gilchrist died on 1 December 1954 at Camperdown, Victoria.

== His career in journalism ==
- Weekly Scotsman, staff reporter from 1893 to 1898, and then editor "for 20 years".
- Edinburgh Evening Dispatch, Editor from 1909 to 1943.

== Publications ==
- William Blacklock, journalist: A love story of press life., Edinburgh and London: Oliphant, Anderson and Ferrier, 1894.
- David Finlayson, Edinburgh and London: Oliphant, Anderson and Ferrier, 1896.
- Mungo Park, Edinburgh: Oliphant, Anderson and Ferrier, 1898, ("Famous Scots Series")
- David Livingstone, Edinburgh: Oliphant, Anderson and Ferrier, 1901, ("Famous Scots Series")

== Sources ==
- Births and deaths information available at the General Register Office for Scotland, Scotlands People Centre in Edinburgh, and also at http://scotlandspeople.gov.uk
- 'MACLACHLAN, Thomas Banks', Who Was Who, A & C Black, 1920–2008; online edn, Oxford University Press, Dec 2007 at http://www.ukwhoswho.com/view/article/oupww/whowaswho/U240212
- Institute of Journalists biography at http://www.scoop-database.com/bio/maclachlan_thomas_banks_1
- British Library catalogue: http://www.bl.uk
- http://openlibrary.org
- http://worldcat.org
