= James Cuthbert Hadden =

Scottish author, journalist, biographer and organist

- Born: 9 September 1859; Banchory, Aberdeenshire, Scotland, U.K.
- Died: 2 May 1914 (aged 54); Edinburgh, Scotland, U.K.
- Occupations: Writer; journalist; biographer; organist
- Spouse: Elizabeth Couper Gordon
- Children: one daughter
- Writing career
- Pen name: J. Cuthbert Hadden
- Genres: Non-fiction, biography, music, opera

J. Cuthbert Hadden (1861–1914) was a prolific Scottish author, journalist, biographer and organist.

== Life ==
Hadden was born in Banchory, Aberdeenshire on 9 September 1859. His father was James Hadden, a general labourer, and his mother was Elizabeth Mathieson.

He began his working life as a bookseller's assistant in Aberdeen and afterwards studied music in London while employed in the publishing house of George Routledge & Sons.

He entered the musical profession and returned to Aberdeen as an organist. In 1881, he became organist of St Michael's Parish Church, Crieff. In 1886, he married Elizabeth Couper Gordon and they had one daughter.

He removed to Edinburgh in 1889, where he abandoned music in favour of literature and his remarkable literary output is shown below.

His recreations are listed as 'walking and gardening.' Hadden wrote at least 98 articles for the Dictionary of National Biography, and the list on this page is taken from the following site s:Author:James Cuthbert Hadden though it may not be complete. Articles written by him in the DNB were designated by the initials "J. C. H."

He died in Edinburgh on 2 May 1914.

== Works ==
=== Biographical ===
- George Frederick Handel. [A biography.] (London: W. H. Allen & Co., 1888.)
- Mendelssohn. [A biography.] (London: W. H. Allen & Co., 1888.)
- The Story of James Hogg, the "Ettrick shepherd": With a Selection from his Poetical Works. (Glasgow: David Bryce and Son [1893.])
- Are You Married? Papers on Love, Courtship, Marriage and Kindred Subjects. (Glasgow: Morison Bros., 1894.)
- George Thomson, the friend of Burns: his life & correspondence. (London: J. C. Nimmo, 1898.)
- Thomas Campbell. (Edinburgh: Oliphant, Anderson and Ferrier, 1899, "Famous Scots Series")
- Haydn, (London: J. M. Dent & Sons, 1902. Series: 'The Master Musicians'.)
- Chopin, (London: J. M. Dent & Sons, 1903. Series: 'The Master Musicians'.)
- The Life of Handel. (London: J. J. Keliher. Series: The Kelkel series of volumes relative to song, music, and biography.)
- The Life of Mendelssohn. (London, J.J. Keliher & Co., 1904. Series: The Kelkel series of volumes relative to song, music, and biography.)
- Prince Charles Edward, His Life, Time, and Fight for the Crown. (London: Sir Isaac Pitman & Sons, 1913).
- Composers in Love and Marriage. (London: John Long, 1913.)

=== Operatic and Other Musical ===
- The Guildhall School of Music. (London: Cassell, 1889.)
- Bell Inscriptions. (London, Griffith, Farran, Okeden, and Welsh, 1891).
- The Great Operas. (London: T.C. & E.C. Jack, 1907.)
- Meistersingers, Wagner. (London: T.C. & E.C. Jack, 1907.)
- Lohengrin, Wagner. (London: T.C. & E.C. Jack [1907?])
- Carmen, Bizet. (London: T.C. & E.C. Jack [1907?])
- The Bohemian Girl, Balfe. (London: T.C. & E.C. Jack, [1907.])
- The Operas of Wagner: Their Plots, Music and History. (London: T. C. & E. C. Jack: London, [1908.])
- Master Musicians. (Edinburgh & London: T. N. Foulis, 1909.)
- Modern Musicians: A Book for Players, Singers & Listeners. (Edinburgh & London: T. N. Foulis, 1913) – companion volume for Master Musicians
- Favourite Operas from Mozart to Mascagni: Their Plots, History, and Music, with twenty-four drawings in colour by Byam Shaw. (London & Edinburgh: T. C. & E. C. Jack:, 1911.)

=== Boys' Books ===
- The Boy's Life of Nelson. (London: S. W. Partridge & Co.[1905.])
- The Nelson Navy Book. (London: Blackie & Son, 1906 [1905].)
- Stirring Sea Fights: A Book for British Boys. (London: S. W. Partridge & Co., [1908.])
- The Boy's Book of the Navy: Its Ships and its Services. (London: S. W. Partridge & Co., [1910.])

== Sources ==
- Who Was Who, A & C Black, 1920–2008; online edn, Oxford University Press, Dec 2007
- http://en.wikisource.org/wiki/Author:James_Cuthbert_Hadden
- Scotlandspeople internet site: www.scotlandspeople.gov.uk.
- British Library catalogue at www.bl.uk.
- Open Library catalogue at www.openlibrary.org
- World Cat at www.worldcat.org
