= William Keith Leask =

Scottish writer and classics lecturer

- Born: 16 April 1857; Aberdeen, Scotland, UK
- Died: 2 May 1925 (age 68); Aberdeen, Scotland, UK
- Occupations: Writer; biographer; historian; lecturer
- Writing career
- Pen name: W. Keith Leask
- Genres: Non-fiction, biography, history, classics

W. Keith Leask (16 April 1857 – 2 May 1925) was a writer and a classics lecturer at the University of Aberdeen. He wrote several biographies and works in classics.

== Biography ==
Leask was born in the parish of Old Machar in Old Aberdeen on 16 April 1857. He was the son of James Leask who attended King's College, Aberdeen 1844-6 and was an advocate in Aberdeen. His mother was Mary Ann Allan. Leask attended Aberdeen Grammar School and graduated M.A. at the University of Aberdeen in 1877. He then studied at the University of Oxford and graduated first class Class. Mods. at Oxford in 1879 and second class Litt. Hum. in 1881. He was employed by the University of Aberdeen as assistant to W D Geddes, Professor of Greek from 1882 to 1887. He returned to Oxford from 1889 to 1894 but was not offered a permanent post. Blair, in his Obituary of Leask, suggests that he should have gone to London and devoted himself to journalism. But Leask returned to Aberdeen and earned his living by writing books and articles for newspapers such as the Glasgow Herald. He died of heart disease at his lodgings at 82 Union Grove, Aberdeen on 2 May 1925. Leask was not married.

== Published works ==
- Hugh Miller. Edinburgh: Oliphant, Anderson and Ferrier, April 1896, ("Famous Scots Series")
- James Boswell. Edinburgh: Oliphant, Anderson and Ferrier, December 1896, ("Famous Scots Series")
- Dr Thomas M'Lauchlan, with Introduction by Principal Rainy. Edinburgh: Oliphant, Anderson and Ferrier, 1905
- Musa Latina Aberdonensis: Poetae Minores. Volume Three, edited by W.K. Leask. Aberdeen: Printed for the New Spalding Club, 1910
- Interamna Borealis: Being Memories and Portraits from an old University Town between the Don and the Dee. Aberdeen: Rosemount Press, 1917
- Presentation of Portrait of Mr. W. K. Leask to Aberdeen Grammar School, 21 October 1922. Aberdeen: Rosemount Press, 1923.
- 'The Record Class', The Aberdeen University Review, March 1924, Vol. XI, No. 32, pp. 97–113

== Sources ==
- www.scotlandspeople.gov.uk
- Roll of the Graduates of the University of Aberdeen, 1860–1900. Aberdeen: Aberdeen University Press, 1906
- University Calendar of Aberdeen University, available at Special Libraries and Archives, Library and Historic Collections, University of Aberdeen, King's College, Aberdeen AB34 3SW
- P. J. Blair, 'William Keith Leask' [Obituary], The Aberdeen University Review, Volume XII, 1924–25. Aberdeen University Press, 1925, pp. 231–8, available at Special Libraries and Archives, Library and Historic Collections, University of Aberdeen, King's College, Aberdeen AB34 3SW
- www.bl.uk
