= John Campbell Smith =

- Born: 12 December 1828; Wellfield, Leuchars, Scotland, UK
- Died: 3 September 1914 (aged 85); Dundee, UK
- Occupations: Writer; biographer; judge; advocate
- Spouse: Hannah Spence Thomson
- Children: Two sons and two daughters
- Writing career
- Pen name: J. Campbell Smith
- Genres: Non-fiction, biography, law
- Notable work: Writings by the Way

John Campbell Smith (1828–1914) was a Scottish writer, advocate and Sheriff-substitute of Forfarshire. He was a typical 'lad o' pairts' – a talented Scots boy of the 19th century who raised himself from extremely humble beginnings.

== Life ==
Campbell Smith was born at Wellfield, near Leuchars in Fife on 12 December 1828. His father, John Smith was a weaver and farmer, and his mother was Anne Campbell. He was educated at the village subscription school till the age of twelve when he became an apprentice mason. He worked at that trade until he earned what he thought was enough to obtain a university education. After saving about £25, he left his work on a Saturday afternoon in St. Andrews where he was working. On the Monday morning he went to Madras College in St. Andrews and, after receiving ten-month's teaching, he gained a bursary through public competition to enter St. Andrews University. The bursary enabled him to pay his fees and he supported himself by private teaching. Graduating M.A. in 1852, he was advised by Sir David Brewster and others to go on to Cambridge University but a teaching vacancy arose at Dundee Academy where he was appointed and held the post of second master for two years. After studying for the Bar, he practised as a successful advocate in Edinburgh. Besides working in the Court of Session, he also defended ministers in the General Assembly of the Church of Scotland. Becoming the Sheriff-substitute at Dundee in 1885, he distinguished himself as judge and was publicly presented with his portrait. His best known work is Writings by the Way (1885), which consists of sketches and biographies of famous Scotsmen previous published as articles in The Scotsman. According to his Obituary: "He believed he could have climbed higher if he had dodged like as a fox, or crawled like an adder" but he valued his own soul too much "to gain the world" or "the applause of multitudes." He married Hannah Spence Thomson on 21 March 1871 at Edinburgh and they had two sons and two daughters. He died in Dundee on 3 September 1914.

== Career ==
- 1852 – School teacher at Dundee Academy
- 1856 – Called to the Bar as an advocate
- 1885 – Appointed Sheriff-substitute of Forfarshire at Dundee
- 1912 – Retired from the legal profession

== Publications ==
- Testimonials to J. C. Smith ... now a candidate for the Chair of Scots Law in the University of Edinburgh. (Edinburgh, 1861.)
- Writings by the Way. Edinburgh: Blackwood & Co., 1885.
- George Buchanan, by Robert Wallace, completed by J. Campbell Smith. Edinburgh: Oliphant, Anderson and Ferrier, 1900, ("Famous Scots Series").
- Robert Wallace: Life and Last Leaves. Edited by J. Campbell Smith and William Wallace. London: Sands & Co., 1903. (William Wallace was the brother of Robert Wallace.)
- Annals of Lodge Fortrose, A.F. & A. M., No. 108, Stornoway. Compiled from the Lodge records. The foreword and a sketch of the Hebrides by J. Ross Robertson. Toronto: J. Ross Robertson, 1905.
- The Marriage Laws of England, Scotland, and Ireland. Being a paper read at the meeting of the Social Science Association at Edinburgh on 13 October 1863. Edinburgh, 1864.

== Sources ==
- Obituary (unattributed), "The Late Sheriff Campbell Smith, Dundee" in the Scotsman newspaper, 4 September 1914, p. 4.
- Births and deaths information available at the General Register Office for Scotland, Scotlands People Centre in Edinburgh, and also at http://scotlandspeople.gov.uk
- British Library catalogue at www.bl.uk.
- National Library of Scotland catalogue at www.nls.uk.
