= John Cairns (1818–1892) =

Scottish Presbyterian minister (1818–1892)

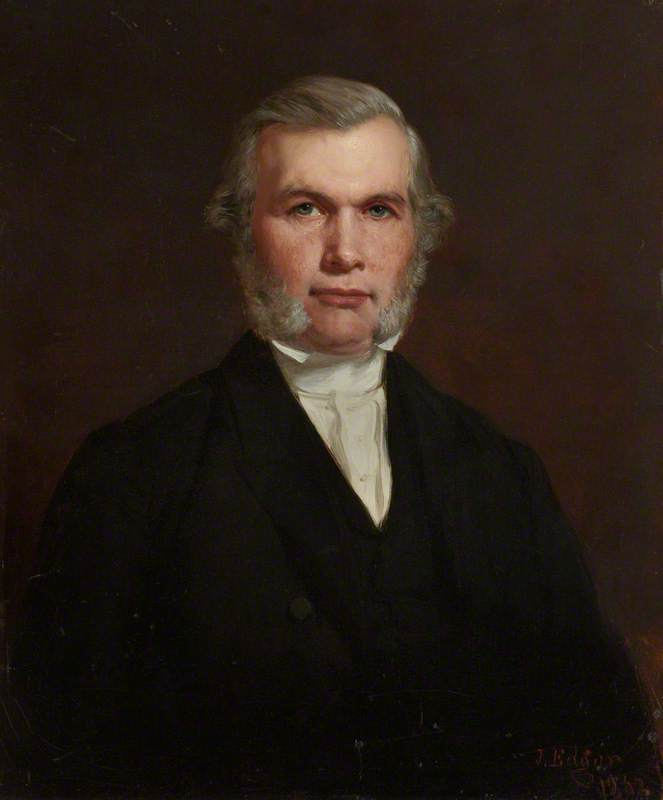

Personal details
- Born: 23 August 1818 Ayton Hill, Berwickshire, Scotland
- Died: 12 March 1892 (aged 73) Edinburgh, Scotland
- Buried: Echo Bank Cemetery, Edinburgh
- Denomination: (1) New Licht United Secession Church; (2) United Presbyterian Church (Scotland)
- Occupation: Minister

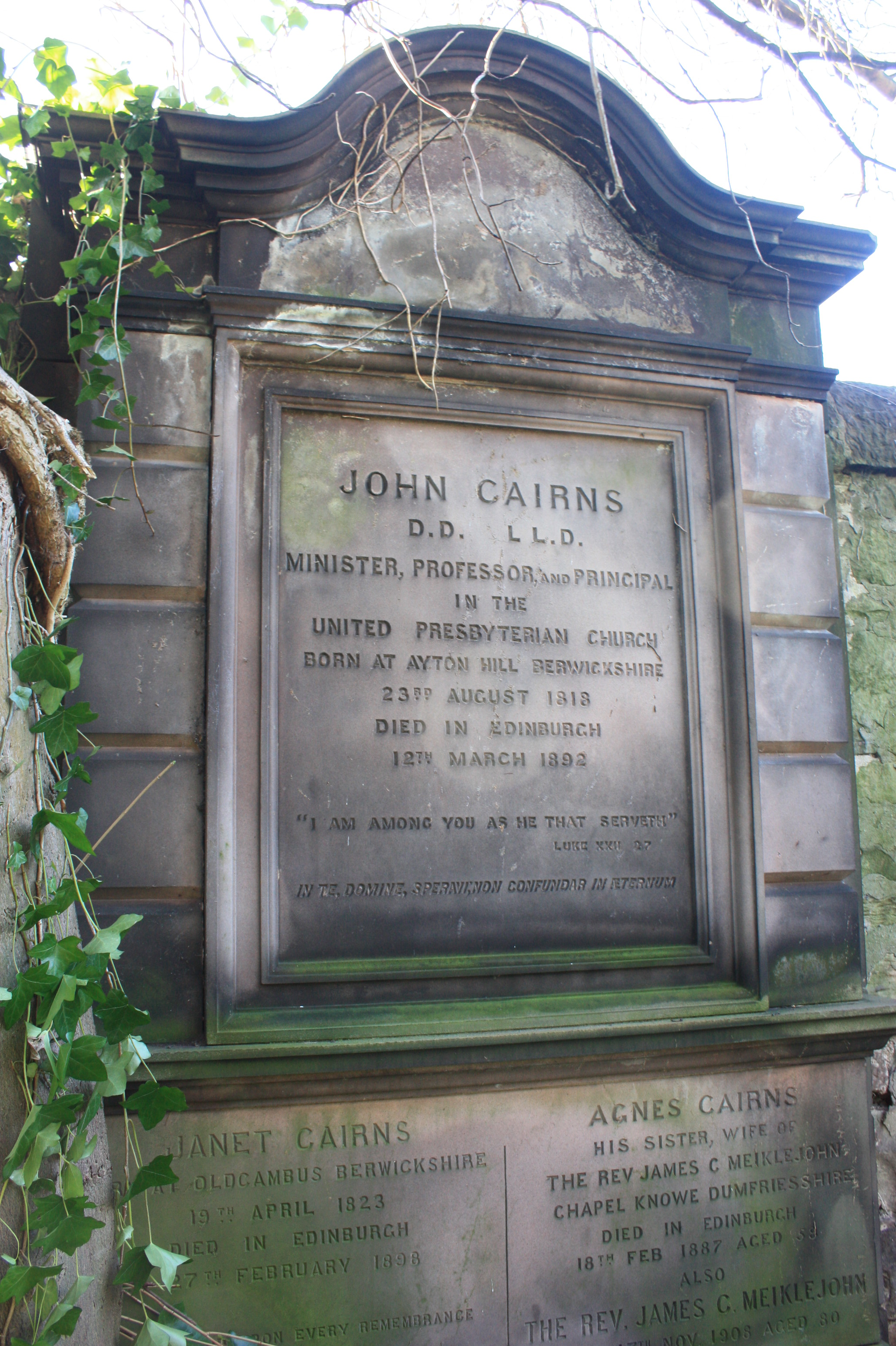
The grave of John Cairns, Newington Cemetery, Edinburgh

John Cairns (23 August 1818 – 12 March 1892) was a Scottish Presbyterian minister.

== Life ==
He was born at Ayton Hill, Berwickshire, on 23 August 1818, the son of John Cairns, a shepherd, and his wife, Alison Murray.

Educated at Ayton and Old Cambus, Berwickshire, he was for three years a herd boy, doing meanwhile private work for his school-master. In 1834, he entered the University of Edinburgh, and, while diversifying his curriculum with teaching in his native parish and elsewhere, became the most distinguished student of his day. Sir William Hamilton (1788–1856), in some instances, discussed Cairns's metaphysical opinions at considerable length in the class-room, and Professor Wilson highly eulogised his talents and his attainments in literature, philosophy, and science. Speaking to his class of a certain mathematical problem that Cairns had solved, Professor Kelland said that it had been solved by only one other of his thousands of students. Cairns was associated with Alexander Campbell Fraser, David Masson, and other leading students in organising the Metaphysical Society for weekly philosophical discussions. He graduated MA in 1841, being facile princeps in classics and philosophy, and equal first in mathematics.

Having entered the Presbyterian Secession Hall in 1840, Cairns continued his brilliant career as a student. In 1843 the movement that culminated in the formation of the Free Church aroused his interest, and an article of his in the 'Secession Magazine' prompted inquiries regarding the writer from Thomas Chalmers. At the end of 1843, Cairns officiated for a month in an English independent chapel at Hamburg, and he spent the winter and spring of 1843–4 at Berlin, ardently studying the German language, philosophy, and theology. On 1 May, he went on a three months' tour through Germany, Austria, Italy, and Switzerland, writing home descriptive and critical letters of great interest. Returning to Scotland, he was licensed as a preacher on 3 February 1845, and on 6 August of the same year he was ordained minister of Golden Square Church, Berwick-on-Tweed. Here he became one of the foremost of Scottish preachers—notable for certain quaint but attractive peculiarities of manner, but above all for his force and impressiveness of appeal—and he declined several invitations to important charges, metropolitan and other, and to professorships both in Great Britain and Canada.

In 1849, visiting the English lakes, Cairns met Wordsworth, from whom he elicited some characteristic views on philosophy and the descriptive graces of Cowper. Interesting himself in public questions at home, he delivered his first great platform speech at Berwick in 1856, when he successfully combated a proposal favouring the introduction into Scotland of the methods of the continental Sunday. In 1857, he addressed in German the members of the Evangelical Alliance in Berlin, having been chosen to represent English-speaking Christendom on the occasion. In 1858 the University of Edinburgh conferred on him the honorary degree of D.D., and in 1859, on the death of John Lee (1779–1859), principal of the university, he declined the invitation of the Edinburgh town councillors to be nominated as his successor.

From 1863 to 1873, the question of union between the United Presbyterian Church and the Free Church of Scotland occupied much of Cairn's attention, but the difficulty was unripe for settlement. Meanwhile, in August 1867, Cairns became professor of apologetics in the United Presbyterian Theological Hall, retaining his charge at Berwick. His students testify to his zeal and success, especially recalling his insistence on the essential harmony between culture and reason. His numerous engagements impaired his strength, and in the autumn of 1868 he recruited on the continent, continuing the process next spring by a walking tour on the Scottish borders, and spending the following autumn in Italy. In May 1872, he was moderator of the United Presbyterian synod, and a few weeks later he officially represented his church in Paris at the first meeting of the Reformed Synod of France. On 16 May 1876, he was appointed joint professor of systematic theology and apologetics with James Harper, principal of the United Presbyterian Theological College. On 18 June, he preached a powerful and touching farewell sermon to an enormous congregation, thus severing his official connection with Berwick, where, however, he frequently preached afterwards.

In the spring of 1877, at the request of Bishop Laughton, Cairns lectured on Christianity in London in the interests of the Jews, and in April the Free Church, making the first exception in his case, appointed him its Cunningham lecturer. In the autumn, he preached for some weeks at Christiania, responding to an invitation to check a threatened schism in the state church of Norway.

He preached in Norsk, specially learned for the purpose. Next summer he was a fortnight in Paris, in connection with the M'All missions, and on the way formed one of a deputation of Scottish ministers who expressed sympathy with Mr. Gladstone in his attitude on the Bulgarian atrocities. While thus assisting elsewhere he worked hard at the United Presbyterian synod this same year in connection with the declaratory act of the church. Diversity of occupation and interest—even on occasion the learning of a new language—seemed indispensable for the exercise of his extraordinary energies and activities. On the death of Principal Harper he was appointed principal of the United Presbyterian Theological College, 8 May 1879. He delivered the Cunningham lecture in 1880, his subject being the unbelief of the eighteenth century. Five months of the same year he spent in an American tour, his personality and preaching everywhere making a deep impression. About the same time he was chairman of a committee of eminent Protestant theologians, European and American, who discussed the possibility of formulating a common creed for the reformed churches.

In 1884, on the occasion of her tercentenary celebrations, University of Edinburgh included Cairns among the distinguished Scotsmen on whom she conferred the honorary degree of LL.D. The death of a colleague in 1886 greatly increased his work, and yet about this time he completed a systematic study of Arabic, and between 1882 and 1886 he had learned Danish and Dutch, the former to qualify him for a meeting of the Evangelical Alliance at Copenhagen, and the latter to enable him to read Kuenen's theological works in the original. In May 1888, his portrait, by W. E. Lockhart, R.A., was presented to the synod by united presbyterian ministers and laymen. He spent some time of 1890 in Berlin and Amsterdam, mainly acquainting himself with the ways of younger theologians. On his return he wrote an elaborate article on current theology for the Presbyterian and Reformed Review. In July 1891, he preached his last sermon in the church of his brother at Stitchel, near Kelso, and in the autumn of that year the doctors forbade further professional work. He resigned his post on 23 February following, and he died at 10 Spence Street, Edinburgh, on 12 March 1892.

He was buried in Echo Bank Cemetery in southern Edinburgh, now known as Newington Cemetery. A large monument against the northern boundary marks his grave.

== Family ==
Cairns never married, and from 1856 onwards his housekeeper was his sister Janet.

== Principal Publications ==
- An Examination of Ferrier's Knowing and Being, and the Scottish Philosophy (a work which gave him the reputation of being an independent Hamiltonian in philosophy)
- Memoir of John Brown, D.D. (1860)
- Romanism and Rationalism (1863)
- Outlines of Apologetical Theology (1867)
- The Doctrine of the Presbyterian Church (1876)
- Unbelief in the 18th Century (1881)
- Doctrinal Principles of the United Presbyterian Church (Dr Blair's Manual, 1888).

== Biographies ==
- MacEwen, Life and Letter of John Cairns (1895).
- Cairns, John, Principal Cairns. Edinburgh: Oliphant, Anderson and Ferrier, 1903, ("Famous Scots Series")
