= Thomas Grainger Stewart =

Scottish physician (1837–1900)

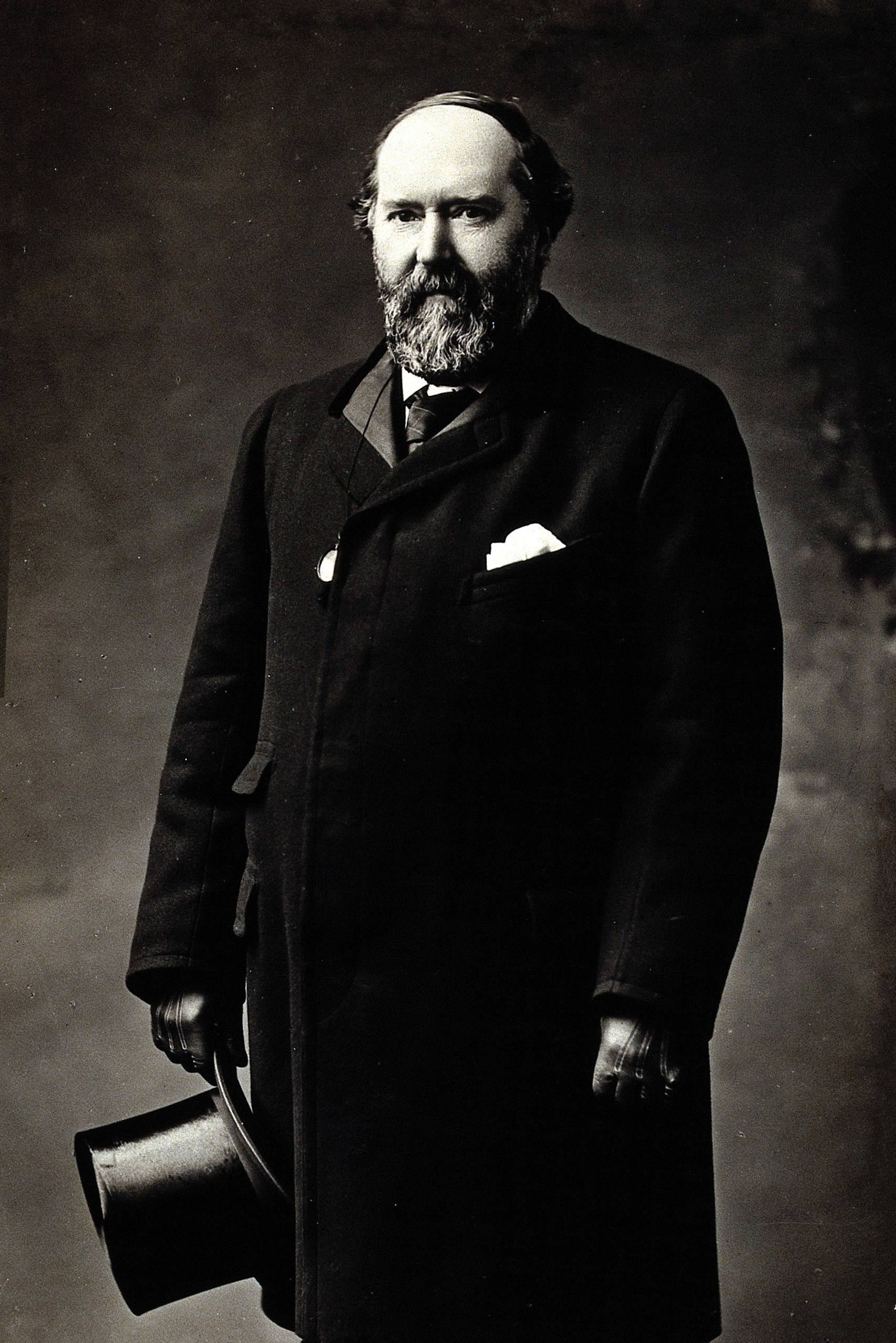
Thomas Grainger Stewart

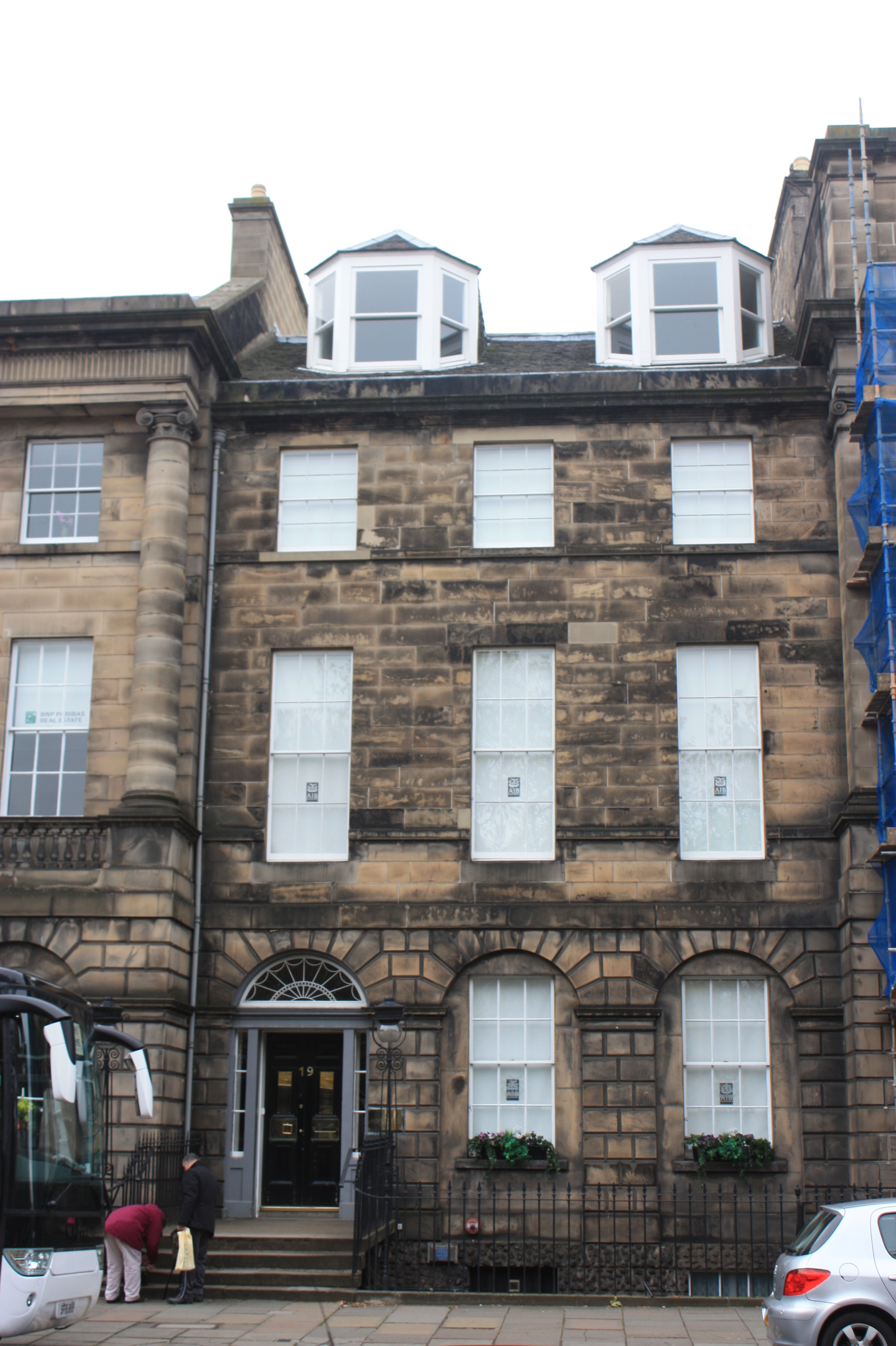
Thomas Grainger Stewart's home at 19 Charlotte Square, Edinburgh

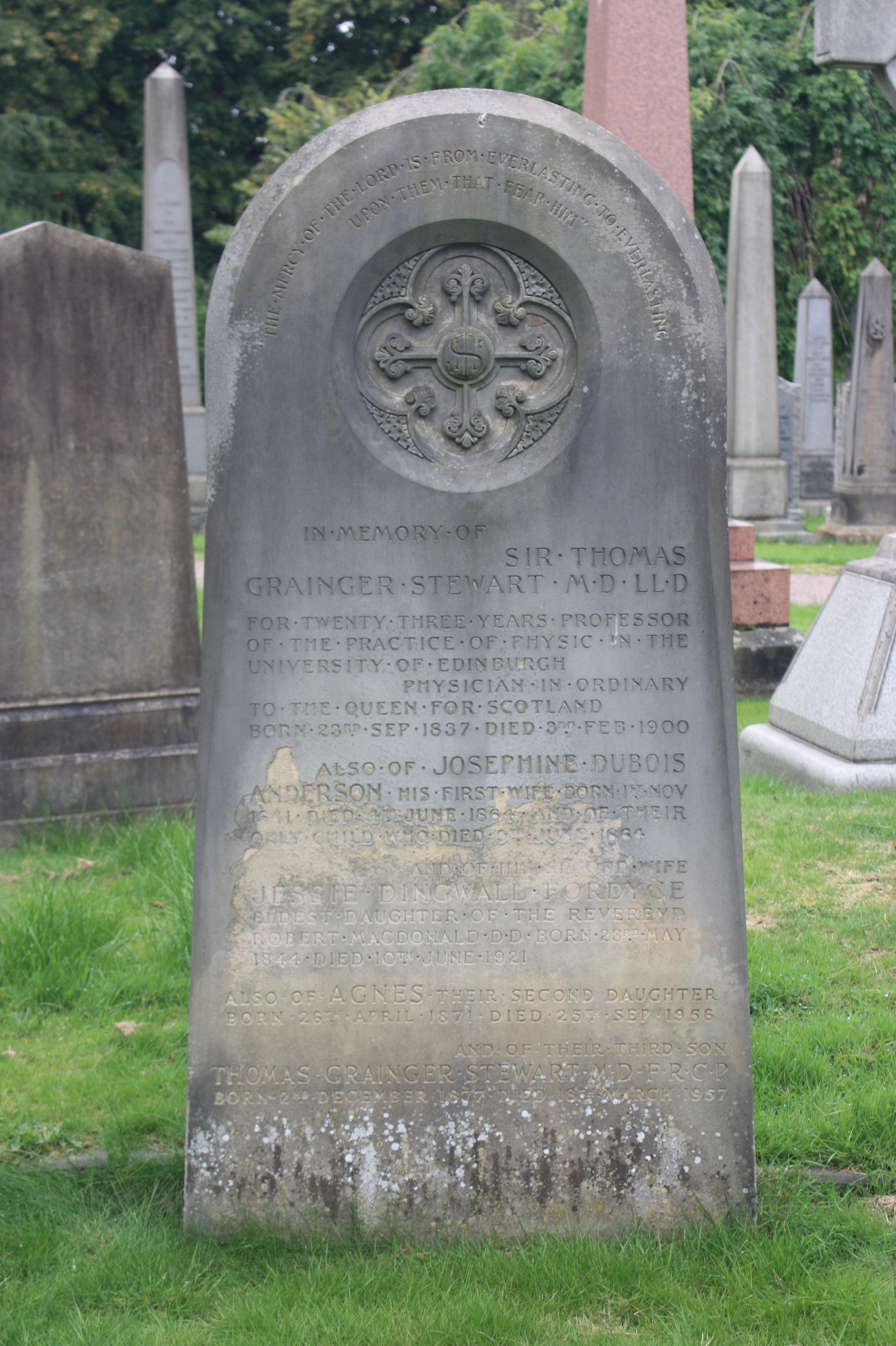
Thomas Grainger Stewart's grave, Dean Cemetery

Sir Thomas Grainger Stewart FRSE FRCPE (23 September 1837, in Edinburgh – 3 February 1900, in Edinburgh) was an eminent Scottish physician who served as president of the Royal College of Physicians of Edinburgh (1889–1891), president of the Medico-Chirurgical Society of Edinburgh, president of the medicine section of the British Medical Association, and Physician-in-Ordinary to the Queen for Scotland. He was perhaps best known for describing the condition known as multiple neuritis as well as directing scientific attention in Great Britain to the deep reflexes.

== Life ==
Thomas Grainger Stewart was born in Edinburgh the son of Alexander Stewart, a painter and decorator, and his wife, Agnes Grainger. The family lived at 88 Princes Street facing Edinburgh Castle.

He was educated at the High School in Edinburgh

He was then accepted at the University of Edinburgh Medical School, graduating MD in 1858, and studied further as a postgraduate in Berlin, Prague and Vienna.

On his return to Edinburgh he became resident physician in the Royal Infirmary. In 1862 he was appointed pathologist to the Royal Infirmary and lecturer on pathology and on diseases of children at the Edinburgh Extramural School of Medicine at Surgeon's Hall. During the following seven years he published numerous papers on pathological and clinical subjects, and in 1869 unsuccessfully contested the chair of general pathology at the University of Edinburgh.

In 1865 he was elected a member of the Harveian Society of Edinburgh and served as president in 1893. In 1866 he was elected a Fellow of the Royal Society of Edinburgh his proposer being John Hutton Balfour. At this time he was living with his family at 32 Queen Street, a fashionable Georgian townhouse.

He resigned his post as pathologist, and was in early 1876 elected ordinary physician to the Royal Infirmary and lecturer on clinical medicine. On the death of Dr. Thomas Laycock later the same year, Grainger Stewart succeeded him as Professor of Medicine at the University of Edinburgh, serving as such until his own death in 1900. He wrote several prominent medical works, notably on kidney, lung and nervous diseases, and the popular textbook On the position and prospects of therapeutics: a lecture introductory to a course on materia medica and dietetic (1862).

Grainger Stewart was president of the tenth International Medical Congress in Berlin, and in 1898 was president of the British Medical Association at its meeting in Edinburgh. From 1889 to 1891 he was president of the Royal College of Physicians of Edinburgh. In 1882 he was appointed a Physician-in-Ordinary to Queen Victoria for Scotland, and in 1894 received a knighthood on the recommendation of the Prime Minister, Lord Rosebery. He received the honorary degree Legum Doctor (LL.D.) from Aberdeen University in 1897.

He was also a literary critic, playwright, and amateur archaeologist, an elder of the Free Church and in politics a Liberal.

In later life Stewart lived at 19 Charlotte Square, one of Edinburgh's most prestigious addresses, just off Princes Street. He died at his residence in Edinburgh on 3 February 1900, and is buried in an east-facing grave in one of the smaller south sections in Dean Cemetery in Edinburgh. The grave is marked by a modest curved stone.

== Family ==
He married twice: first in 1863 to Josephine Dubois Anderson, who died the following year; second, in 1866, to Jessy Dingwall Fordyce MacDonald, daughter of Robert MacDonald. Both wives are buried with him.

His daughter, Agnes Grainger Stewart, was a writer.

== Artistic recognition ==
His sketch portraits of 1884, by William Brassey Hole, are held by the Scottish National Portrait Gallery.
