= List of books for the "Famous Scots Series" =

This is a list of books published as the "Famous Scots Series" by the Edinburgh publishers, Oliphant, Anderson and Ferrier, from 1896 to 1905. Forty-two of these books were published though least one volume in the series was planned but never published. These books are distinctive for their bright red covers and uniform presentation. They are generally of a quite high scholarly quality. The authors often had access to biographical material which is no longer available. Two versions of each volume were published. An upmarket version has gilded lettering and motifs on the front cover and has gilt tape as book marker. It is about a quarter of inch longer than the ordinary version which is gilded only on the edge.

Thirty-three of the authors were men and five were women. It appears that all the women were educated at home, presumably by tutors or governesses. Three of the women wrote biographies of Robert Louis Stevenson, namely, Margaret Moyes Black, Rosaline Masson and Eve Blantyre Simpson.

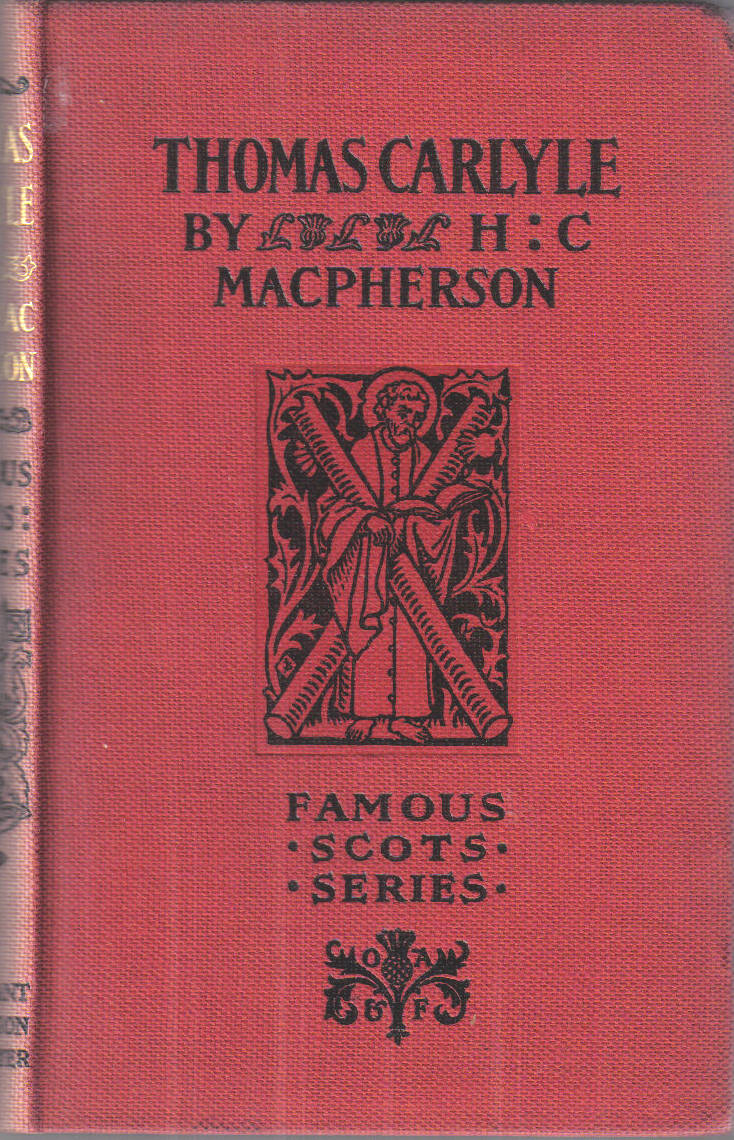
Front cover of Thomas Carlyle, no. 1 in the series. The plain version of the book

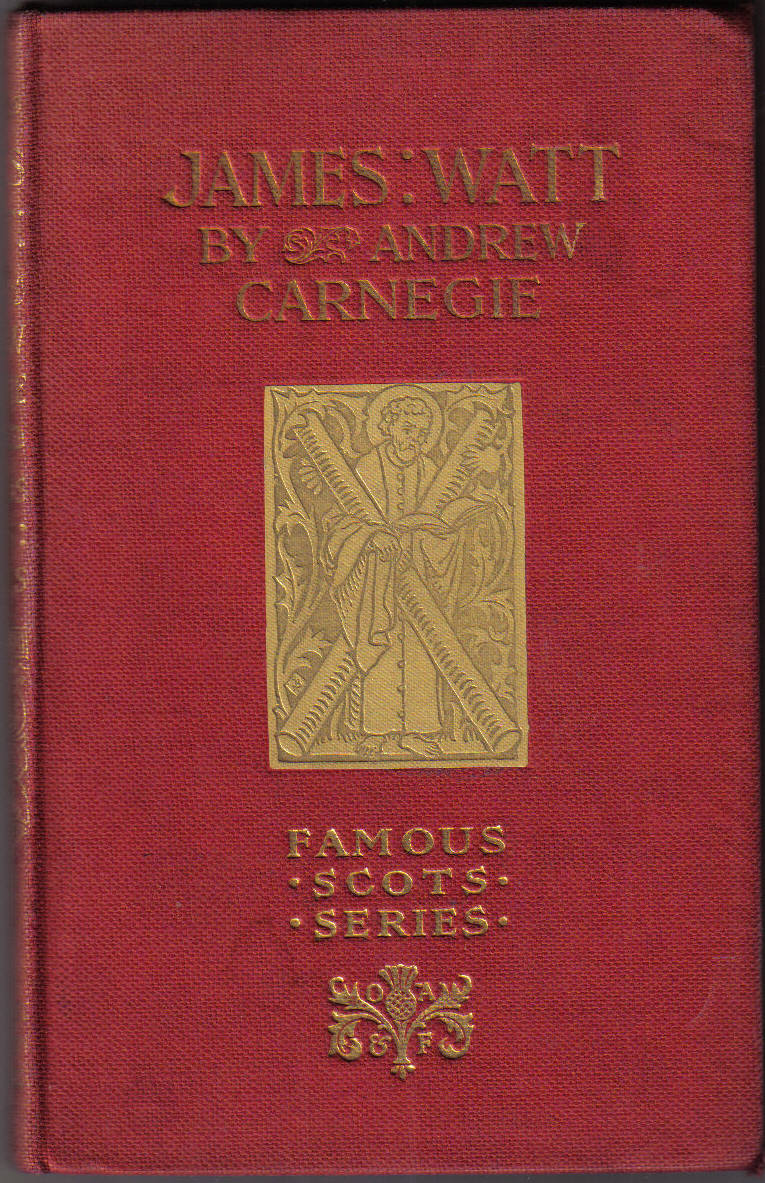
Front cover of James Watt, no. 42 in the series. This shows the gilt upmarket version of the book

No	Title	Author	Date	Notes
1	Thomas Carlyle	Hector C. Macpherson	Feb 1896	A biography by Macpherson's son states that "his volume on Carlyle, which appeared in February 1896, was the first of the 'Famous Scots' Series."
2	Allan Ramsay	Oliphant Smeaton	March 1896	There is a copy of this book signed by "Daniel K. Campbell" and dated by him "March 1896".
3	Hugh Miller	W. Keith Leask	March 1896	
4	John Knox	A. Taylor Innes	May 1896	
5	Robert Burns	Gabriel Setoun	Jun 1896	"Gabriel Setoun" is the nom de plume of Thomas Nicoll Hepburn.
6	The Balladists	John Geddie	Jul 1896;	Balladists including:Thomas the Rhymer, Robert Henryson, Lady Wardlaw, Lady Nairne, Lady Anne Barnard, Robert Burns, Sir Walter Scott, etc.
7	Richard Cameron	John Herkless	Oct 1896	
8	Sir James Y. Simpson	Eve Blantyre Simpson	Oct 1896	
9	Thomas Chalmers	W. Garden Blaikie	Dec 1896	
10	James Boswell	W. Keith Leask	Dec 1896	
11	Tobias Smollett	Oliphant Smeaton	Feb 1897	
12	Fletcher of Saltoun	G.W.T. Omond	Mar 1897	
13	The “Blackwood” Group	Sir George Douglas	Apr 1897	This group includes John Wilson, John Galt, D. M. Moir, Susan Ferrier, Michael Scott, and Thomas Hamilton.
14	Norman Macleod	John Wellwood	Apr 1897	
15	Sir Walter Scott	George Saintsbury	Jun 1897	
16	Kirkcaldy of Grange	Louis A. Barbé	Oct 1897	
17	Robert Fergusson	A. B. Grosart	Jan 1898	
18	James Thomson	William Bayne	Jan 1898	
19	Mungo Park	T. Banks Maclachlan	Mar 1898	
20	David Hume	Henry Calderwood	Feb 1898	
21	William Dunbar	Oliphant Smeaton	Apr 1898	
22	Sir William Wallace	A. F. Murison	Jun 1898	
23	Robert Louis Stevenson	Margaret Moyes Black	Aug 1898	
24	Thomas Reid	A. Campbell Fraser	Feb 1898	
25	Pollok and Aytoun	Rosaline Masson	Nov 1898	
26	Adam Smith	Hector C. Macpherson	Feb 1899	
27	Andrew Melville	William Morison	Jul 1899	
28	James Frederick Ferrier	E. S. Haldane	May? 1899	E. S. Haldane's full name is Elizabeth Sanderson Haldane
29	King Robert the Bruce	A. F. Murison	Jul 1899	
30	James Hogg	Sir George Douglas	Sep 1899	Also included are short biographies of the poets Robert Tannahill, William Motherwell, and William Thom
31	Thomas Campbell	J. Cuthbert Hadden	Oct 1899	
32	George Buchanan	Robert Wallace	Dec 1899	Completed by J. Campbell Smith.
33	Sir David Wilkie and the Scots school of painters	Edward Pinnington	Jan? 1900	These include: Allan Ramsay (artist), James Tassie, David Allan, Sir Henry Raeburn, Sir William Allan, Sir Noel Paton etc.
34	The Erskines	A. R. MacEwen	Apr 1900	They are the brothers: Ebenezer and Ralph Erskine.
35	Thomas Guthrie	Oliphant Smeaton	May 1900	
36	David Livingstone	T. Banks Maclachlan	Jan? 1901	
37	The Academical Gregories	Agnes Grainger Stewart	Apr 1901	These include: John Gregory, James Gregory, William Gregory, etc. The book outlines the lives of twelve Gregories from 1638 to 1858
38	Johnston of Warriston	William Morison	May 1901	
39	Henry Drummond	James Y. Simpson	Oct 1901	The author's father was nephew of his namesake, James Young Simpson, the discoverer of chloroform.
40	Principal Cairns	John Cairns	Mar 1903	John Cairns (1857-1922) was the nephew of Principal Cairns.
41	Viscount Dundee	Louis A. Barbé	1903	
42	James Watt	Andrew Carnegie	1905	The year 1905 is mentioned on page 28 of the book where Carnegie states: "Even in 1905 we have still a far road to travel."

No more books in this series were published, as is evidenced by the following report in the New York Times in 1904:
"LONDON, Sept. 16. -- Andrew Carnegie has written a little book on James Watt, the great engineer. It will be the concluding volume of the Famous Scots Series, published by Messrs. Oliphant, Anderson Ferrier."
