= John Cairnes =

John Cairnes may refer to:

- John Cairnes (politician), Irish MP for Augher
- John Elliott Cairnes (1823–1875), Irish economist

== See also ==
- John Cairns (disambiguation)
