= John Cairns (1857–1922) =

- Born: 13 April 1857; Stichill, Roxburghshire, Scotland, U.K.
- Died: 13 May 1922 (aged 65); Edinburgh, Scotland, U.K.
- Occupations: Writer; biographer; minister
- Writing career
- Genres: Non-fiction, biography, history

John Cairns (1857–1922) was a United Presbyterian Church minister, writer and biographer. He was born on 13 April 1857 at Stichill in Roxburghshire. He was the son of Rev. David Cairns, United Presbyterian Church minister at Stichill, and of Elizabeth Williamson Smith. He was educated at Edrom Parish School in Berwickshire and at University of Edinburgh where he graduated M.A. in 1878. He trained for the ministry at United Presbyterian College, Edinburgh and at Leipzig University. He wrote a biography of his uncle, John Cairns in the "Famous Scots Series". He died in Edinburgh on 13 May 1922.

== Career as Minister ==
- June 1882 – Licensed by U. P. Presbytery of Kelso
- 1882-3 – Assistant at Dumbarton Bridgend
- 1883-4 – Assistant at Dumfries Buccleuch Street
- 16 Oct 1884 – Ordained and inducted as Minister at Dumfries Buccleuch Street
- April 1922 – Retired as Minister at Dumfries Buccleuch Street

== Administrative Posts with UF Church ==
- 1907-8 – Vice-Convener of Continental Committee
- 1909 – Convener of Continental Committee
- 1913–22 – Convener of Colonial and Continental Committee

== Publications ==
- Principal Cairns. Edinburgh: Oliphant, Anderson and Ferrier, 1903, ("Famous Scots Series")
- Our Continental Mission Field and its Historic Background. Edinburgh: United Free Church of Scotland, 1921.

== Sources ==
- The Fasti of the United Free Church of Scotland, 1900–1929. Edited by the Rev. John Alexander Lamb. Edinburgh and London: Oliver & Boyd, 1956. p. 102.
- Scotlandspeople internet site: www.scotlandspeople.gov.uk.
