= Margaret Moyes Black =

Scottish novelist and biographer

- Born: 27 April 1853; Scoonie, Fife, Scotland, UK
- Died: 16 October 1935 (aged 82); Montrose, Angus, UK
- Occupations: Writer; novelist; biographer; botanist
- Writing career
- Pen name: M.B. Fife
- Genres: Non-fiction, novels, biography, botany

Margaret Moyes Black (pseudonym, M.B. Fife; 1853–1935) was a Scottish novelist and biographer. She was born on 27 April 1853 in the parish of Scoonie, Fife. Her father was William Black, a shipmaster, and her mother was Margaret Moyes Deas. She wrote her first novel, In Glenoran, under the pseudonym of M.B. Fife. Of the volume on Robert Louis Stevenson, in the Famous Scots Series, Black stated in her preface that it is, "only a reminiscence and an appreciation by one who, in the old days between 1869 and 1880, knew him and his home circle well." She was unmarried and died on 16 October 1935 at Montrose, Angus. (Note: Adapted from the births and deaths information available at the General Register Office for Scotland, Scotlands People Centre in Edinburgh, and also at http://scotlandspeople.gov.uk)

== Selected works ==
- In Glenoran. [A Novel.] Edinburgh & London: Oliphant, Anderson and Ferrier, 1888 (pseudonym).
- Tempted: An Episode. Edinburgh & London: Oliphant, Anderson and Ferrier, 1889.
- Between the Ferries. A Story of Highland Life. Edinburgh & London: Oliphant, Anderson and Ferrier, 1890
- Disinherited. Edinburgh & London: Oliphant, Anderson and Ferrier, 1891
- A Woman and Pitiful. A Deeside Story. Edinburgh & London: Oliphant, Anderson and Ferrier, 1893
- The Ghost of Gairn. A Tale of "The Forty-Five.". Edinburgh & London: Oliphant, Anderson and Ferrier, 1894
- The House of Cargill. A Tale of the Smuggling Days. Edinburgh & London: Oliphant, Anderson and Ferrier, 1895.
- A Most Provoking Girl. A Tale of the East Coast, etc. Edinburgh & London: Oliphant, Anderson and Ferrier, [1896.]
- Facts and Fancies about Flowers. Edinburgh & London: Oliphant, Anderson and Ferrier, 1897. Series: Science Talks to Young Thinkers
- Robert Louis Stevenson, Edinburgh: Oliphant, Anderson and Ferrier, Aug 1898, ("Famous Scots Series")
