= William Leask =

Scottish dissenting minister and religious author

William Leask (1812–1884) was a Scottish dissenting minister and religious author. He served as Editor to several Christian periodicals. His views were far from mainstream, including the coming of a Theocratic Utopia and hoping for the mass conversion of all Jews to Christianity.

== Life ==
Leask was born at Churchbank in Kirkwall, Orkney on 4 March 1812. He suffered from encephalitis as a child but recovered in his teenage years. In 1828 he joined the Scottish Secession church.

In 1834 he moved to Edinburgh. He had employment as a clerk and Sunday School teacher. He also became a religious agitator and began writing theological works. In 1835 he and his new wife moved to Liverpool in England. In 1839 he moved to Dover as a lay preacher. In 1846 he moved to Esher Street in Kennington, London. In 1857 he moved to Ware, Hertfordshire.

He became Editor of several Christian periodicals: the Christian Examiner (1853–54); the Christian Times (1864), and The Rainbow (1864–66). For his services to Christianity Jefferson University in the USA awarded him an honorary Doctor of Divinity (DD).

He died at 34 Sandringham Road in Dalston on 6 November 1884 and his funeral service took place at Maberley Chapel on 9 November. He is buried in Abney Park Cemetery in London.

== Publications ==
- The Hall of Vision (1838)
- Philosophical Lectures (1846)
- The Evidences of Grace (1846)
- The Footsteps of Messiah (1847)
- The Two Lights (1856)
- Autobiography of a Dissenting Minister (1864)
- Carey Glynn the Child Teacher (1868)
- The Scripture Doctrine of a Future Life (1877)
