= Harold G. Leask =

Irish architectural historian and archaeologist

Harold Graham Leask
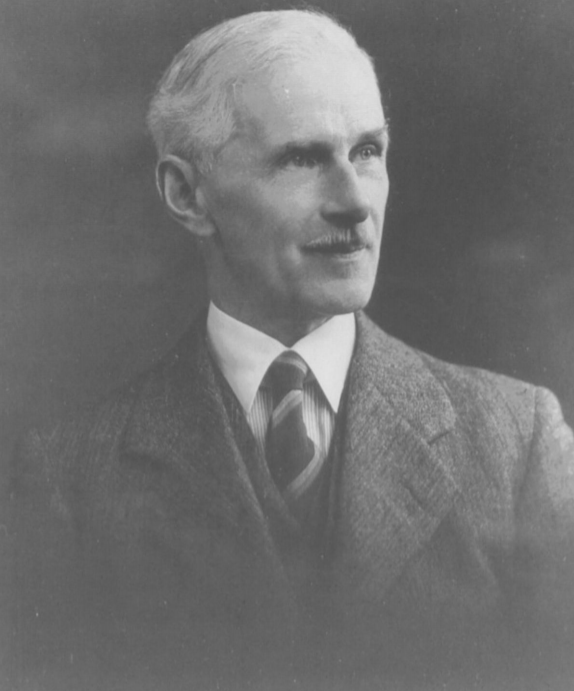
- Leask in 1942
- Born: 7 November 1882; Dublin, Ireland
- Died: 25 September 1964 (aged 81); Dublin, Ireland
- Resting place: Mount Jerome Cemetery
- Spouse: Ada Leask

Harold G. Leask (7 November 1882 – 25 September 1964) was an Irish architectural historian, archaeologist and the first Inspector of National Monuments of the Irish Free State.

== Early life ==
Harold Graham Leask was born in Dublin on 7 November 1882, most likely at the family home in Harold's Cross. His parents were Anna Louisa (née Molloy) and Robert Leask. He was the youngest of at least 3 brothers and 3 sisters of the Presbyterian family.

== Career ==
From 1898 to 1902, Leask was apprenticed to his father, a Scottish-born architect and engineer, and then went on to work firstly in a Dublin ironfounders, followed by some time in a Waterford drawing office, before working for George Patrick Sheridan for two years. He rejoined his father for a time, but left when he was appointed a temporary assistant surveyor in the Office of Public Works around 1908 or 1909. His position was made permanent, and he rose to the position of assistant architect.

Leask was appointed the first Inspector of National Monuments in 1923, just after the foundation of the Irish Free State, and served in the position until his retirement in September 1949. For a number of years Leask held practically sole responsibility for all elements relating to the access, assessment and conservation of the most important Irish historical and archaeological sites. He oversaw the scheduling of a large number of monuments, including many neglected Anglo-Norman sites. This was despite the chronic under-funding and under-staffing of his department. He developed a uniquely deep knowledge of specific sites across Ireland, which allowed him to speak to architectural styles and trends in Ireland holistically.

He oversaw the initial restoration of the Casino at Marino and Dunsoghly Castle. He also advocated for the establishment of a government body for "buildings of historic, architectural or antiquarian interest" which fell outside of his remit.

=== Publication ===
He wrote scholarly articles and notes, both describing and illustrating archaeological sites and buildings for a wide range of journals and periodicals, but a large number were published by the Royal Society of Antiquaries of Ireland (RSAI) Journal. Among his most important contributions were Irish castles and castellated houses (1941) and Irish churches and monastic buildings in three volumes (1955, 1960). He spoke and lectured widely, and often led RSAI field trips. He continued to study the stone built architecture of early Christian and medieval Ireland after his retirement in 1949, while taking up a post as professor of archaeology in the National College of Art and Design for a short time.

== Recognition ==
In 1930, he was elected as a member of the Royal Irish Academy, and served on its committee for "polite literature" and antiquities as secretary for over 30 years. From 1941 to 1944, he was president of the Royal Society of Antiquaries of Ireland, and in 1950 was awarded an honorary fellowship of the Society. The National University of Ireland awarded him an honorary degrees of master of architecture in 1942, and Trinity College Dublin awarded him a D.Litt in 1951.

== Personal life ==
Until her death in January 1939, Leask lived with his older sister. He married Ada Longfield, a fellow historian and antiquary, on 31 January 1940 in St Bartholomew's church, Clyde Road, Dublin. He died on 25 September 1964 at home and is buried in Mount Jerome Cemetery.

=== Art ===
Leask exhibited artworks with the Water Colour Society of Ireland between 1924 and 1935.

== Legacy ==
The National Library of Ireland, the Library of Trinity College Dublin, and the Office of Public Works all hold drawings and manuscripts by Leask. The Irish Architectural Archive hold a photography album by Leask.
