= Ada Leask =

Irish historian and antiquary

- Born: Ada Kathleen Longfield; 27 October 1899; Kanpur, Uttar Pradesh, India
- Died: 12 August 1987 (aged 87); Dublin
- Resting place: Mount Jerome Cemetery
- Spouse: Harold G. Leask

Ada Leask (27 October 1899 – 12 August 1987) was an Irish historian and antiquary.

== Life ==
Ada Leask was born Ada Kathleen Longfield in Kanpur, Uttar Pradesh, India, on 27 October 1899. Her parents were Major Alfred Percival Longfield (1862–1916) and Constance Ada (née Sanders) (died 1967) of Edinburgh. She was their eldest daughter. Due to her ill health, she spent much of her childhood with relatives in west County Cork. While attending Trinity College Dublin, she won prizes each year, and graduated in 1921 with a BA and LLB. She then began a Masters in the London School of Economics, graduating in 1926. In 1929 she published her thesis on Anglo-Irish trade in the 16th century. Having briefly worked as a teacher, she took up a position in the National Museum of Ireland in 1932 in the art and industrial section. She was one of the last employees to receive some training in the Victoria and Albert Museum in London.

Upon her marriage to the architect and archaeologist Harold G. Leask, she left her job into the museum owing to the marriage bar. She continued with her own research, writing books and articles on Irish lace, delftware, tombstones, embossed pictures, wallpaper, wall-paintings, and textiles. She worked with the Irish Manuscripts Commission, resulting in the Shapland Carew papers in 1946 and the Fitzwilliam accounts 1560–65 in 1960. She worked alongside her husband in his inspections of archaeological sites. In 1952 she was elected a member of the Royal Irish Academy, and was an active member of the County Kildare Archaeological Society, the Royal Society of Antiquaries of Ireland and the Irish Georgian Society.

Amongst Leask's close friends was the poet John Betjeman. She was a supporter of the Irish language, and attended the Christ Church Cathedral Irish services. She continued her research and writing despite her deteriorating eyesight in the 1970s. Leask died in Dublin on 12 August 1987, and was buried in Mount Jerome Cemetery.
