= Leask v Commonwealth =

Judgement of the High Court of Australia

- Court: High Court of Australia
- Full case name: Stephen Arthur Leask v The Commonwealth of Australia
- Decided: 5 November 1996
- Citation: (1996) 187 CLR 579

Case history
- Prior action: none
- Subsequent action: none

Court membership
- Judges sitting: Brennan CJ, Dawson, Toohey, Gaudron, McHugh, Gummow and Kirby JJ

Case opinions
- (7:0) The Financial Transactions Reports Act 1988 (Cth) is a valid law under the currencies power (per Brennan CJ, Dawson, Toohey, Gaudron, McHugh, Gummow & Kirby JJ)

Leask v Commonwealth (1996) 187 CLR 579 is a High Court of Australia case that discussed the role of proportionality in the Australian Constitution.

== Background ==
The act under question was the Financial Transactions Reports Act 1988 (Cth), which imposed an obligation on 'cash dealers' to report all transactions above $10,000 to a statutory authority. It was also an offence if it could be proved the transactions were designed to avoid tracking. The offence was a strict liability offence.

== Decision ==
=== Incidentality ===
Once there is a sufficient connection, between the Act and the head of power, proportionality is irrelevant for non-purposive powers. Whether or not there is a sufficient connection does not rely on the desirability of the legislation.

=== Proportionality ===
It was noted that the law was disproportionate to the currency and coins power (section 51(xii)), and that it was an inappropriate means to achieving the end. (Proportionality may be examined by testing if the law is appropriate and adapted to some means.) Dawson J. noted that the test of whether the measures in a law are appropriate and necessary to achieve certain objectives, while used in Europe, was irrelevant for the Australian Constitution; "[t]hey are essentially political rather than judicial considerations".

Re Dingjan; Ex parte Wagner described the process by which it is determined whether a law is "with respect to" a section 51 head of power:

1. By reference to the rights, powers, liabilities, duties and privileges which it creates (Commonwealth v Tasmania)
2. A judgment as to the connection of this characterisation to the head of power

Thus, the connection involves some kind of degree, but once it has been established, it does not matter whether the law is appropriate for its aims.

However, proportionality may be relevant, and a law not invalid, if an immunity conferred by a limitation of a power is affected incidentally by the achievement of a legitimate end.

== See also ==
- Australian constitutional law
