= Marilyn Leask =

Education researcher

- Born: Marilyn Markwell; 1950 (age 74–75); Beaudesert, Queensland, Australia
- Education: Cambridge Institute of Education/UEA; De Montfort University, UK

Marilyn Leask (née Markwell; born 1950) is an academic and author who researches in education in the UK. She is Professor of Education at De Montfort University, and was previously Professor of Educational Knowledge Management at the University of Bedfordshire and a professor at Brunel University. Many of her works involve the educational use of information and communications technology (ICT).

== Education and career ==
She received a Diploma in Radiography from the Australasian Institute of Radiologists and Radiographers, a BA from the Open University, a PGCE from the Institute of Education, University of London (now UCL IOE), an MPhil from the Cambridge Institute of Education/UEA and a PhD from De Montfort University, UK.

Leask worked as a teacher and government policy officer. She has written several books for Routledge and is the series editor, with Susan Capel, of the book series, Learning to Teach in the Secondary School, used in training secondary-school teachers in the UK.

She then moved into academia, holding positions at the University of Bedfordshire and Brunel University. As of 2021, she is Visiting Professor of Education in the School of Applied Social Sciences at De Montfort University, Leicester.

Leask was a trustee of the Bedford & Milton Keynes Waterway Trust.

== Books ==
- Hargreaves, D, and Hopkins, D, with Leask, M. (1991) The Empowered School: The management and practice of development planning. London: Continuum.
- Goddard D., Leask M. (1992). The Search for Quality: Planning for Improvement and Managing Change. London: Paul Chapman Publishing/Sage Publications.
- Leask M., Terrell I. (1997). Development Planning and School Improvement for Middle Managers. London: Kogan Page.
- Leask M., Meadows J. (eds). (2000) Learning to Teach with ICT in the Primary School. London: Routledge.
- Leask M., with Dawes L., Litchfield B. (2000) Keybytes for Teachers. Evesham: Summerfield Publishing.
- Leask M. (ed.) (2001) Issues in Teaching with ICT. London: Routledge.
- Capel S., Leask M., Turner T. (2nd edition 2004, 1996). Starting to Teach in the Secondary School. London: Routledge.
- Younie S., Capel S., Leask M. (2009) Supporting Teaching and Learning in the Secondary School: a companion for higher level teaching assistants. London. Routledge.
- Capel S., Leask M., Turner T. (2009) Reading for Learning to Teach in the Secondary School. London: Routledge.
- Younie S., Leask M. (2013) The Essential Guide to Teaching with Technologies. MK: Open University Press.
- Leask M., Pachler, N. (eds) (3rd edition 2013). Teaching and Learning with ICT in the Secondary School. Abingdon: Routledge.
- Younie S., Leask M., Burden K. (2014, 2nd edition) Teaching and Learning with ICT in the Primary School. Abingdon: Routledge. ISBN 1317667603
- Capel S., Leask M., Turner T. (2019, 8th edition) Learning to Teach in the Secondary School. Abingdon: Routledge. ISBN 978-0415518369
- Hudson, B., Leask, M and Younie, S. (eds) (2020) Education System Design: Foundations, Policy Options and Consequences. Routledge. ISBN 9780429261190
