= Oliphant, Anderson and Ferrier =

Scottish publishing company

Oliphant, Anderson and Ferrier was a Scottish publishing company based in the national capital Edinburgh.

It produced many hundreds of books mainly on religious and biographical themes, especially during its heyday from about 1880 to 1910. It is probably best remembered for its memorable ‘Famous Scots Series’ with their distinctive red and gilt covers. Forty-two of them were published from 1896 to 1905 and many have been reprinted recently by other publishers. The firm also published the works of Annie S. Swan, a very popular writer in her time. It existed in some form from 1807 to 1968. It was incorporated as ‘Oliphants Ltd’ in 1915 and taken over by the publishers, Marshall, Morgan & Scott in 1946. Oliphants Ltd was voluntarily liquidated without debt in 1968.

== Origins ==
The firm originated with William Oliphant (1773–1842) as a bookseller in 1807. He had been apprenticed with William Creech, the publisher of Robert Burns' poems and began his publishing business in 1818 with juvenile books. He was apparently still selling books as there exists a catalogue of 1823 which offers a variety of religious books for sale. In 1830, Oliphant took his sons into partnership and the firm was renamed ‘W. Oliphant & Sons’. William Oliphant died in 1842 and he was succeeded by his son William (1807–1860) who continued the business successfully until 1858 when ill-health forced him to take on two partners, Robert Anderson and Thomas Robertson, who ran the business under the name of 'W. Oliphant & Co.'

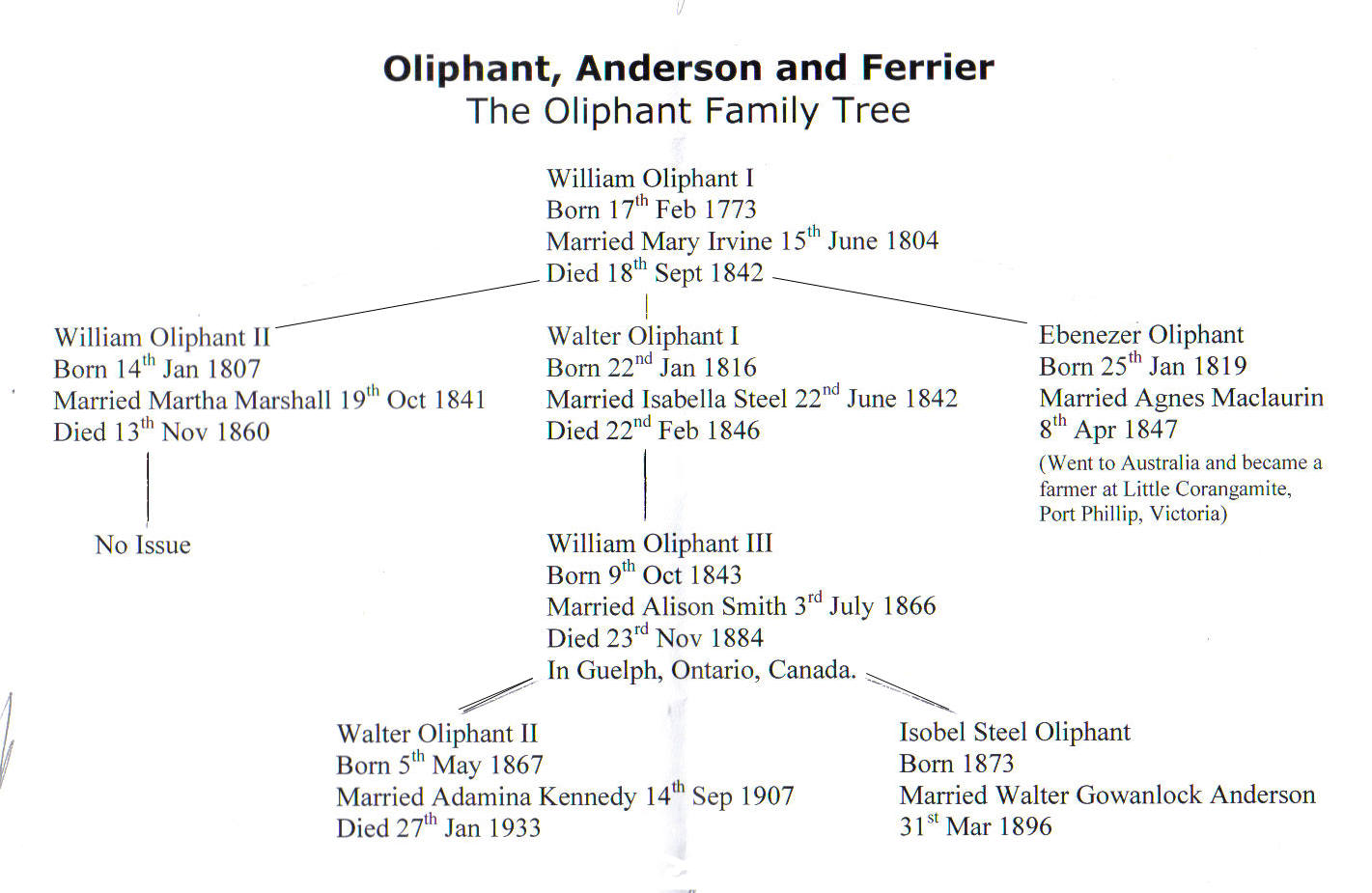
This family tree is compiled from births, deaths and marriages information available at the General Register Office for Scotland, ScotlandsPeople Centre in Edinburgh.

Addresses

- 1807 - Oliphant and Brown, booksellers, High Street
- 1808 – Oliphant and Brown, 2 Hunter Square
- 1809–1810 – Oliphant and Balfour, booksellers, 2 Hunter Square
- 1811–1817 – Oliphant, Waugh and Innes, booksellers, same address
- 1818–1832 – William Oliphant, 22 South Bridge
- 1833–1835 – William Oliphant, 7 South Bridge
- 1836–1860 – William Oliphant & Son, 7 South Bridge
- 1861–1871 – William Oliphant & Co., 7 South Bridge
- 1872–1874 – William Oliphant & Co., 57 Frederick Street
- 1875–1880 – William Oliphant & Co., 24 St. Giles Street, and 35–37 St. Mary Street
- 1880 onwards – Oliphant, Anderson and Ferrier

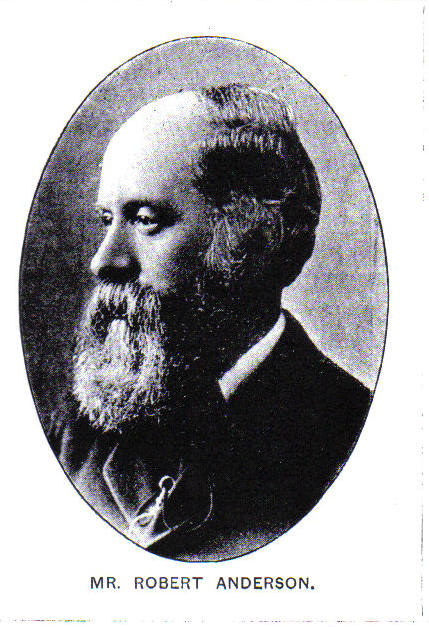
Anderson was the head of the firm during his lifetime.

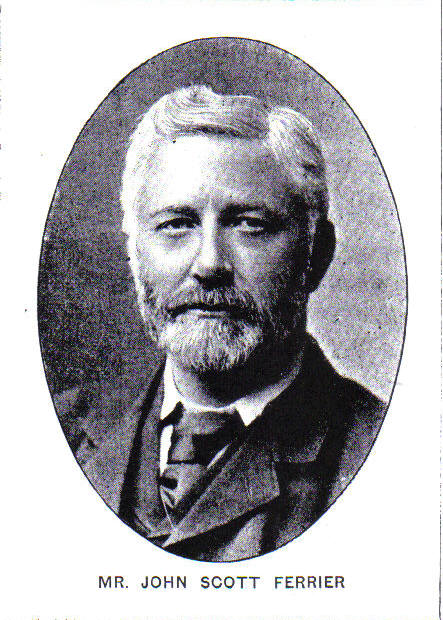
These photographs are copied from The Publishers' Circular of 1891 and are reproduced courtesy of Edinburgh City Libraries and Information Services - Edinburgh Room.

== Oliphant, Anderson and Ferrier ==
In 1880, Thomas Robertson retired and John Scott Ferrier took his place. The firm was then named ‘Oliphant, Anderson and Ferrier’ although Robert Anderson was head of the firm and the Oliphants were no longer involved in the day-to-day running of the firm. William Oliphant III (1866–1884) went to Canada and died there, although his son, Walter Oliphant II (1867–1933) remained in Edinburgh as a solicitor of the Supreme Courts in Scotland. During this latter period, the firm had a showroom at 100 Princes Street, and offices and a warehouse (with bookbinding) at 29-37 St. Mary Street, Edinburgh. Its London office was at 21 Paternoster Square.

Robert Anderson (1830–1901) lived all his life in Edinburgh and had an intimate knowledge of the publishing industry in Edinburgh. In 1891, he gave a talk to the Edinburgh Bibliographical Society on 'Reminiscences of Edinburgh Booksellers of My Early Days, Forty-eight Years Ago'. After his death in 1901, the firm began its slow decline and, apparently, no more works in the "Famous Scots Series" were commissioned. The last of them was published in 1905.

John Scott Ferrier (1844–1910) was born in Brechin and began as a bookseller there. He moved to Elgin where he established a wholesale and retail bookselling business before moving to Edinburgh.

== Family connections ==
Four related Oliphants, three Andersons and two Ferriers were involved with this firm at some stage. Isobel Steel Oliphant (born 1873), the daughter of William Oliphant III, married Walter Gowanlock Anderson (1866–1914), the eldest son of Robert Anderson, in 1896. These family connections with the firm effectively ended when Walter Oliphant II (1867–1933), an Edinburgh solicitor, sold his shares in Oliphants Ltd in 1920.

== Oliphants Ltd ==
Following the death of Walter Gowanlock Anderson in 1914, the firm was incorporated as ‘Oliphants Ltd’ on 11 June 1915. The directors were: Walter Oliphant, solicitor, Edinburgh; John Davidson, publisher, London; Angus Ferrier, publisher, Edinburgh; Thomas Craig Muir, journalist, London; and William Walker Grant, journalist, London. Walter Oliphant was the great grandson of William Oliphant (see family tree) and Angus Ferrier was the son of John Scott Ferrier. The company continued to publish books mainly on a religious theme. It was taken over by the London publishers, Marshall, Morgan & Scott Ltd. in 1945 and was liquidated voluntarily and without debts on 27 March 1968.

== Some books published by Oliphants Ltd ==
- The Rev. John Ross D.D. The Origin of the Chinese People, Edinburgh: Oliphants Ltd., 1916.
- C.F. Hogg, Touching the Coming of the Lord, Edinburgh and London: Oliphants Ltd., 1919.
- W.E. Vine, Vine’s Expository Dictionary of Old and New Testament Words, London: Oliphants Ltd., 1940.
- Phyllis Matthewman, William Chalmers Burns, London: Oliphants Ltd., 1953 (Heroes of the Cross series).
- Jean A. Rees, Antonia : Told by the Lady with the Sun Lamp, Edinburgh and London, Oliphants Ltd., 1957.
- Eugenia Price, Woman to Woman, London: Oliphants Ltd., 1963.

== Book series ==
- Bible Characters (Alexander Whyte)
- Bunyan Characters
- Butterfly Series
- Famous Scots Series
- Heroes of the Cross
- Lakeland Series
- Oliphant, Anderson and Ferrier's Popular Series
- Oliphant, Anderson and Ferrier's Popular Two Shilling Series
- Oliphant's Shilling Series
- Pocket Novels
- Reformation Bookshelf
