= Scotland's National Book Awards =

Scottish literary awards

Scotland's National Book Awards, formerly known as the Saltire Society Literary Awards, are made annually by the Saltire Society. First awarded in 1937, they are awarded for books by Scottish authors or about Scotland, and are awarded in several categories.

== History ==
The first Saltire Society Book Award was given in 1937, the year after the Saltire Society was established. No awards were given after 1939 due to the Second World War, and the next award was made 1956. The History Book of the Year award was inaugurated in 1965. In 1982 sponsorship was obtained and since then the awards have been made annually. First books have been recognised since 1988, and in 1998 the award for Scottish Research Book of the Year was established.

Until around 2021, the awards were known as the Saltire Society Literary Awards, subtitled Scotland's National Book Awards, but then took on the subtitle as the name covering all of the literary awards that the society awards: Scotland's National Book Awards, and are known by this name as of May 2023.

== Description ==
The awards seek to recognise books which are either by "living authors of Scottish descent or residing in Scotland," or which deal with "the work or life of a Scot or with a Scottish question, event or situation".

As of 2022, the winner in each category receives an award created by artist Simon Baker of Evergreen Studios, based in Inverness; the winners of each literary award receive a cash prize of £2,000, while the winner of the Saltire Society Book of the Year is given a further £4,000.

== Categories ==
A one-off Homecoming Book of the Year award was made in 2009 to celebrate the "Year of homecoming": the award was presented to American professor Donald Worster for his biography of John Muir, A Passion for Nature. The shortlist consisted of The Bard: Robert Burns, A Biography, by Robert Crawford, The Testament of Cresseid and Seven Fables, by Seamus Heaney, The Lamplighter, by Jackie Kay and Piano Angel, by Esther Woolfson.

In 2014, the Scottish Literary Book of the Year was awarded, but was replaced after only one year by separate awards for Fiction Book of the Year and Non-Fiction Book of the Year

As of 2022, the Saltire Society presents awards in seven categories for books, and three awards for publishers:

- Saltire Society Scottish Book of the Year Award (formerly "Scottish Book of the Year")
- Saltire Society First Book of the Year
- Saltire Society History Book of the Year
- Saltire Society Research Book of the Year
- Saltire Society Poetry Book of the Year (introduced in 2014)
- Saltire Society Fiction Book of the Year (introduced in 2015)
- Saltire Society Non-Fiction Book of the Year (introduced in 2015)
- Saltire Society Book Cover Design of the Year
- Saltire Society Publisher of the Year
- Saltire Society Emerging Publisher of the Year (awarded in partnership with Publishing Scotland)

In 2019, a Lifetime Achievement Award was introduced, the inaugural prize going to Alasdair Gray.

Subsequent winners of the lifetime achievement have been:

- Douglas Dunn (2021)
- Alexander McCall Smith (2022)
- Liz Lockhead (2023)
- James Kelman (2024)
- Kate Atkinson (2025)

In addition, an annual student travel bursary is awarded to a creative writing graduate, and the Ross Roy Medal is awarded for the best PhD thesis on a subject related to Scottish literature.

== Past winners ==
=== Scottish Book of the Year ===
The Scottish Book of the Year award was established in 1937, and was given annually since 1982 until 2024. The award is open to novels, poetry and plays as well as non-fiction works on Scottish subjects.

Year	Work	Author	Ref(s)
1937	Highland River	Neil M. Gunn	
1937	The Lord Bothwell	Robert Gore-Browne	
1939	Three Plays	Robert McLellan	
1956	One Foot in Eden	Edwin Muir	
1958	Scotland Before History	Stuart Piggott	
1982	Lanark: A Life in Four Books	Alasdair Gray	
1983	Collected Poems	Derick Thomson	
1983	Poems of Thirty Years	Edwin Morgan	
1984	God and the Poets: The Gifford Lectures	David Daiches	
1984	Intimate Voices: Selected Works	Tom Leonard	
1985	Collected Poems	Norman MacCaig	
1986	A Storm from Paradise	Stuart Hood	
1987	The Stories of Muriel Spark	Muriel Spark	
1988	Games with Shadows	Neal Ascherson	
1988	The Enchanted Glass: Britain and Its Monarchy	Tom Nairn	
1989	A Question of Loyalties	Allan Massie	
1990	O Choille gu Bearradh / From Wood to Ridge	Sorley MacLean	
1991	Scottish Art 1460–1990	Duncan Macmillan	
1992	Collected Poems	Iain Crichton Smith	
1993	Robert Burns – A Biography	James A. Mackay	
1994	Beside the Ocean of Time	George Mackay Brown	
1995	Black Sea	Neal Ascherson	
1996	The Kiln	William McIlvanney	
1997	Grace Notes	Bernard MacLaverty	
1998	The Sopranos	Alan Warner	
1999	Pursuits	George Bruce	
2000	The Lantern Bearers	Ronald Frame	
2001	Medea	Liz Lochhead	
2002	Clara	Janice Galloway	
2003	Joseph Knight	James Robertson	

Year	Work	Author	Result	Ref(s)
2004	In Another Light	Andrew Greig	Winner	
2004	An Oidhche Mus Do Sheol Sinn	Aonghas Padraig Caimbeul	Shortlist	
2004	Visiting the Bard	Alisdair Campbell	Shortlist	
2004	The Soap Man	Roger Hutchinson	Shortlist	
2004	You Have to be Careful in the Land of the Free	James Kelman	Shortlist	
2004	Paradise	A L Kennedy	Shortlist	
2004	All The Poems	Muriel Spark	Shortlist	
2005	Case Histories	Kate Atkinson	Winner	
2005	The Fahrenheit Twins	Michel Faber	Shortlist	
2005	Robert Louis Stephenson	Claire Harman	Shortlist	
2005	Blackbird	David Harrower	Shortlist	
2005	Gymnippers Diciadain	Martainn Mac an t-saoir	Shortlist	
2005	The People's Act Of Love	James Meek	Shortlist	
2005	Narrating Scotland: The Imagination of Robert Louis Stevenson	Barry Menikoff	Shortlist	
2005	The Accidental	Ali Smith	Shortlist	
2006	A Lie About My Father	John Burnside	Winner	
2006	Scott of the Antarctic, A Life of Courage and Tragedy in the Extreme South	David Crane	Shortlist	
2006	Rapture	Carol Ann Duffy	Shortlist	
2006	Collected Poems 1965-2005	Duncan Glen	Shortlist	
2006	Bad Shaman Blues	W N Gilbert	Shortlist	
2006	Be Near Me	Andrew O'Hagan	Shortlist	
2006	The Testament of Gideon Mack	James Robertson	Shortlist	
2007	Day	A. L. Kennedy	Winner	
2007	Soirbheas	Meg Bateman	Shortlist	
2007	Scotland's Books: The Penguin History of Scottish Literature	Robert Crawford	Shortlist	
2007	The Last Mughal, The Fall of a Dynasty, Delhi, 1857	William Dalrymple	Shortlist	
2007	My Father: Reith of the BBC	Marista Leishman	Shortlist	
2007	A History of Modern Britain	Andrew Marr	Shortlist	
2007	Snìomh Nan Dual - 6 Cluichean	Iain Moireach	Shortlist	
2007	Orpheus	Don Paterson	Shortlist	
2007	The Flowers of the Forest, Scotland and the First World War	Trevor Royle	Shortlist	
2008	Kieron Smith, Boy	James Kelman	Winner	
2008	The Red Book	Meaghan Delahunt	Shortlist	
2008	The Lost Leader	Mick Imlah	Shortlist	
2008	An Latha as Fhaide	Màrtainn Mac an t-Saoir	Shortlist	
2008	We Are Now Beginning Our Descent	James Meek	Shortlist	
2008	The Atlantic Ocean	Andrew O'Hagan	Shortlist	
2008	Girl Meets Boy	Ali Smith	Shortlist	
2009	The Bard: Robert Burns, a Biography	Robert Crawford	Winner	
2009	Fighting It	Regi Claire	Shortlist	
2009	The Gate Of Air	James Buchan	Shortlist	
2009	This Is Not About Me	Janice Galloway	Shortlist	
2009	What Becomes	A L Kennedy	Shortlist	
2009	When I Heard The Bell Toll: The Loss Of The Iolaire	John MacLeod	Shortlist	
2010	And the Land Lay Still	James Robertson	Winner	
2010	At the Loch of the Green Corrie	Andrew Greig	Shortlist	
2010	Dunsinane	David Greig	Shortlist	
2010	Da Happie Land	Robert Alan Jamieson	Shortlist	
2010	Gormshuil an Righ	Fionnlagh Macleoid	Shortlist	
2010	Hamish Henderson: v. 2: Poetry Becomes People (1954-2002)	Timothy Neat	Shortlist	
2010	Rain	Don Paterson	Shortlist	
2010	Adam Smith, An Enlightened Life	Nick Phillipson	Shortlist	
2010	The Stars in the Bright Sky	Alan Warner	Shortlist	
2011	A Life in Pictures	Alasdair Gray	Winner	
2011	A Summer Of Drowning	John Burnside	Shortlist	
2011	Fiere	Jackie Kay	Shortlist	
2011	The Blue Book	A L Kennedy	Shortlist	
2011	There But For The...	Ali Smith	Shortlist	
2011	Reading Shakespeare's Sonnets	Don Paterson	Shortlist	
2011	The Cuillin 1939 and other Unpublished Poems	editor Christopher White	Shortlist	
2012	Mo Said She Was Quirky	James Kelman	Winner	
2012	Sightlines	Kathleen Jamie	Shortlist	
2012	The Bees	Carol Ann Duffy	Shortlist	
2012	Deanamh Gaire ris a’ Chloc (or Laughing at the Clock)	Aonghas MacNeacail	Shortlist	
2012	Tales From The Mall	Ewan Morrison	Shortlist	
2012	Deadman's Pedal	Alan Warner	Shortlist	
2012	Skagboys	Irvine Welsh	Shortlist	
2013	Something Like Happy	John Burnside	Winner	
2013	Life After Life	Kate Atkinson	Shortlist	
2013	The Professor Of Truth	James Robertson	Shortlist	
2013	Empire Antarctica	Gavin Francis	Shortlist	
2013	Mairi Dhall agus Sgeulachdan	Donnchadh Macgilliosa	Shortlist	
2013	Looking For Mrs Livingstone	Julie Davidson	Shortlist	
2013	Artful	Ali Smith	Shortlist	

Year	Work	Author	Ref(s)
2014	The Scottish Town in the Age of Enlightenment 1740–1820	Bob Harris and Charles McKean	
2015	The Book of Strange New Things	Michel Faber	
2016	The Bonniest Companie	Kathleen Jamie	
2017	Border: A Journey to the Edge of Europe	Kapka Kassabova	
2018	All That Remains	Sue Black	
2019	Working Verse in Victorian Scotland: Poetry, Press, Community	Kirstie Blair	
2020	No award given		
2021	Duck Feet	Ely Percy	
2022	Slaves and Highlanders: Silenced Histories of Scotland and the Caribbean	David Alston	
2023	Womb: The Inside Story of Where We All Began	Leah Hazard	
2024	Thunderclap	Laura Cumming	

=== Scottish Literary Book of the Year ===
The award for Literary Book of the Year was introduced in 2014, and was open to fiction, non-fiction or plays. The award only existed for one year before being replaced by separate awards for Fiction and Non-Fiction.

Year	Work	Author	Result	Ref(s)
2014	How to Be Both	Ali Smith	Winner	
2014	All the Rage	A L Kennedy	Shortlist	
2014	Gone Are the Leaves	Anne Donovan	Shortlist	
2014	Where Memories Go	Sally Magnusson	Shortlist	
2014	Cala Bendita	Martin MacIntyre	Shortlist	
2014	The James Plays	Rona Munro	Shortlist	

=== Scottish Fiction Book of the Year ===
The fiction book of the year award was inaugurated in 2015.

Year	Work	Author	Result	Ref(s)
2015	The Book of Strange New Things	Michel Faber	Winner	
2015	The Illuminations	Andrew O'Hagan	Shortlist	
2015	A Decent Ride	Irvine Welsh	Shortlist	
2015	Jellyfish	Janice Galloway	Shortlist	
2015	An Dosan	Norma Nicleod	Shortlist	
2015	God in Ruins	Kate Atkinson	Shortlist	
2016	His Bloody Project	Graeme Macrae Burnet	Winner	
2016	The Blade Artists	Irvine Welsh	Shortlist	
2016	Dirt Road	James Kelman	Shortlist	
2016	The Sunlight Pilgrims	Jenni Fagan	Shortlist	
2016	This Must Be the Place	Maggie O'Farrell	Shortlist	
2016	The Brilliant and Forever	Kevin MacNeil	Shortlist	
2017	Memory and Straw	Angus Peter Campbell	Winner	
2017	Midwinter Break	Bernard MacLaverty	Shortlist	
2017	The Long Drop	Denise Mina	Shortlist	
2017	That Was a Shiver	James Kelman	Shortlist	
2017	Dalila	Jason Donald	Shortlist	
2017	Ashland and Vine	John Burnside	Shortlist	
2018	Elsewhere, Home	Leila Aboulela	Winner	
2018	A Treachery of Spies	Manda Scott	Shortlist	
2018	Dead Men's Trousers	Irvine Welsh	Shortlist	
2018	The Growing Season	Helen Sedgwick	Shortlist	
2018	The Great Chain of Unbeing	Andrew Crumey	Shortlist	
2018	The Sealwoman's Gift	Sally Magnusson	Shortlist	
2019	Nina X	Ewan Morrison	Winner	
2019	Bird Summons	Leila Aboulela	Shortlist	
2019	You Will Be Safe Here	Damian Barr	Shortlist	
2019	Tiger	Polly Clark	Shortlist	
2019	Ducks, Newburyport	Lucy Ellmann	Shortlist	
2019	Còig Duilleagan na Seamraig (Five Leaves of the Shamrock)	Ruairidh MacIlleathain (Roddy MacLean)	Shortlist	
2020	No award given			
2021	Duck Feet	Ely Percy	Winner	
2021	Scabby Queen	Kirstin Innes	Shortlist	
2021	Shuggie Bain	Douglas Stuart	Shortlist	
2021	Luckenbooth	Jenni Fagan	Shortlist	
2021	There's Only One Danny Garvey	David F. Ross	Shortlist	
2022	Blood & Gold: A Journey of Shadows	Mara Menzies	Winner	
2022	Be Guid Tae Yer Mammy	Emma Grae	Shortlist	
2022	Cwen	Alice Albinia	Shortlist	
2022	News of the Dead	James Robertson	Shortlist	
2022	The Pharmacist	Rachelle Atalla	Shortlist	
2022	Young Mungo	Douglas Stuart	Shortlist	
2023	In Ascension	Martin MacInnes	Winner	
2023	crann-fie/Fig Tree	Duncan Gillies	Shortlist	
2023	Electricity	Andrew Peter Campbell	Shortlist	
2023	Hell Sans	Ever Dundas	Shortlist	
2023	Mother Sea	Lorraine Wilson	Shortlist	
2023	Orpheus Builds a Girl	Heather Parry	Shortlist	
2024	What Doesn't Kill Us	Ajay Close	Winner	
2024	Study for Obedience	Sarah Bernstein	Shortlist	
2024	Clear	Carys Davies	Shortlist	
2024	Lost People	Margaret Elphinstone	Shortlist	
2024	Hazardous Spirits	Anbara Salam	Shortlist	
2025	A Woman of Opinion	Sean Lusk	Winner	
2025	Idle Grounds	Krystelle Bamford	Shortlist	
2025	This Bright Life	Karen Campbell	Shortlist	
2025	Phantom Limb	Chris Kohler	Shortlist	
2025	Hermit	Chris McQueer	Shortlist	
2025	Muckle Flugga	Michael Pedersen	Shortlist	

=== Scottish First Book of the Year ===
The first book of the year award was inaugurated in 1988 and recognises an author who has not previously published a book. As with the book of the year, the award is open to novels, plays, poems and non-fiction. After 2006, books shortlisted for the award were listed alongside the winner.

Year	Work	Author	Ref(s)
1988	The Richt Noise	Raymond Vettese	
1989	Cells of Knowledge	Sian Hayton	
1990	The Ballad of Sawney Bain	Harry Tait	
1991	Night Geometry and the Garscadden Trains	A. L. Kennedy	
1992	Adoption Papers	Jackie Kay	
1992	Uirsgeul/Myth	Christopher Whyte	
1993	Robert Louis Stevenson: Dreams of Exile	Ian Bell	
1994	Music, in a Foreign Language	Andrew Crumey	
1995	Free Love and Other Stories	Ali Smith	
1996	Slattern	Kate Clanchy	
1997	A Painted Field	Robin Robertson	
1998	The Pied Piper's Poison	Christopher Wallace	
1998	Two Clocks Ticking	Dennis O'Donnell	
1999	Some Rain Must Fall	Michel Faber	
2000	The Rising Sun	Douglas Galbraith	
2001	In the Blue House	Meaghan Delahunt	
2002	Burns the Radical	Liam McIlvanney	
2002	The Cutting Room	Louise Welsh	
2003	Ath – Aithne	Martainn Mac an t-saoir	

Year	Work	Author	Result	Ref(s)
2004	Stargazing: Memoirs of a Young Lighthouse Keeper	Peter Hill	Winner	
2004	Nineteen Seventy-Nine, A Big Year in a Small Town	Rhona Campbell	Shortlist	
2004	The Glass House	Sophie Cook	Shortlist	
2004	An Abridged History	Andrew Drummond	Shortlist	
2004	Consider An Island	Rhona Rauszer	Shortlist	
2005	Amande's Bed	John Aberdein	Winner	
2005	After Elizabeth: How King James of Scots won the Crown of England in 1603	Leanda de Lisle	Shortlist	
2005	Ghosting	Jenny Erdal	Shortlist	
2005	Whit Lassyz Ur Inty	Alison Flett	Shortlist	
2005	No Fireworks	Rodge Glass	Shortlist	
2005	The Knife Man: The Extraordinary Life and Times of John Hunter, Father of Modern Surgery	Wendy Moore	Shortlist	
2006	George Mackay Brown: The Life	Maggie Fergusson	Winner	
2006	These Are Only Words	Simon R Biggam	Shortlist	
2006	White Host Girls	Alice Greenway	Shortlist	
2006	The Observations	Jane Harris	Shortlist	
2006	Demo	Alison Miller	Shortlist	
2007	Fresh	Mark McNay	Winner	
2007	Writing in the Sand	Angus Dunn	Shortlist	
2007	The Tenderness of Wolves	Stef Penney	Shortlist	
2007	Shadow Behind the Sun	Remzije Sherifi with Robert Davidson	Shortlist	
2008	The Good Mayor	Andrew Nicoll	Winner	
2008	The Wall	D C Jackson	Shortlist	
2008	James Kelman	Simon Kövesi	Shortlist	
2008	The Redemption Of Alexander Seaton	Shona MacLean	Shortlist	
2008	Moonshine In The Morning	Andrea McNicholl	Shortlist	
2008	The Peachgrower's Almanac	Elaine di Rollo	Shortlist	
2009	The Tin-Kin	Eleanor Thom	Winner	
2009	Chokechain	Jason Donald	Shortlist	
2009	Eating Pomegranates	Sarah Gabriel	Shortlist	
2009	Cainnt na Caileige Caillte	Alison Lang	Shortlist	
2009	Chapel at the Edge of the World	Kirsten McKenzie	Shortlist	
2010	The History of Orkney Literature	Simon W. Hall	Winner	
2010	The Death of Lomond Friel	Sue Peebles	Winner	
2010	The Prisoner of St Kilda: The True Story of the Unfortunate Lady Grange	Margaret Macauley	Shortlist	
2010	And This Is True	Emily Mackie	Shortlist	
2010	A' Ghlainne agus Sgeulachdan Eile	Màiri E. NicLeòid	Shortlist	
2010	Homecomings	Donald Paterson	Shortlist	
2011	The Echo Chamber	Luke Williams	Winner	
2011	Island of Wings	Karin Altenberg	Shortlist	
2011	This Road Is Red	Alison Irvine	Shortlist	
2011	Let Not the Waves of the Sea	Simon Stephenson	Shortlist	
2012	The Last Highlander: Scotland’s Most Notorious Clan-Chief, Rebel and Double Agent	Sarah Fraser	Winner	
2012	Air Bilean an t-Sluaigh: Sealladh air Leantalachd Beul-Aithris Ghàidhlig Uibhist a Tuath	Maighread A. Challan	Shortlist	
2012	Tony Hogan Bought Me an Ice Cream Float Before He Stole My Ma	Kerry Hudson	Shortlist	
2012	The Incomers	Moira McPartlin	Shortlist	
2012	Furnace	Wayne Price	Shortlist	
2012	Ramshackle	Elizabeth Reeder	Shortlist	
2013	Air Cuan Dubh Drilseach	Tim Armstrong	Winner	
2013	As Far As I Can See	Eunice Buchanan	Winner	
2013	The Necessary Death of Lewis Winter	Malcolm Mackay	Shortlist	
2013	Nothing Is Heavy	Vicky Jarrett	Shortlist	
2013	Kaleb's List	Kellan MacInnnes	Shortlist	
2014	Moontide	Niall Campbell	Winner	
2014	Any Other Mouth	Anneliese Mackintosh	Shortlist	
2014	The Legacy of Elizabeth Pringle	Kirsty Wark	Shortlist	
2014	The Monster's Wife	Kate Horsley	Shortlist	
2014	The Last Pair of Ears	Mary F McDonough	Shortlist	
2014	The Rental Heart	Kirsty Logan	Shortlist	
2015	On the Edges of Vision	Helen McClory		
2015	60 Degrees North	Malachy Tallack	Shortlist	
2015	Airstream	Audrey Henderson	Shortlist	
2015	Lie of the Land	Michael F Russell	Shortlist	
2015	The Liepzig Affair	Fiona Rintoul	Shortlist	
2015	The Peoples Referendum	Peter Geogheghan	Shortlist	
2016	Trials on Death Row	Isabel Buchanan	Winner	
2016	Expecting	Chitra Ramaswamy	Winner	
2016	Infinite Ground	Martin McInnes	Shortlist	
2016	This Changes Things	Claire Askew	Shortlist	
2017	Goblin	Ever Dundas	Winner	
2017	The Case Room	Kate Hunter	Shortlist	
2017	Language of My Choosing: The Candid Life-Memoir of an Italian Scot	Anne Pia	Shortlist	
2017	Beneath the Skin	Sandra Ireland	Shortlist	
2017	Mary's the Name	Ross Sayers	Shortlist	
2017	Fallow	Daniel Shand	Shortlist	
2018	Sal	Mick Kitson	Winner	
2018	Amphibian	Christina Neuwirth	Shortlist	
2018	St Kilda: The Silent Islands	Alex Boyd	Shortlist	
2018	A' Togail an t-Srùbain	Calum L. MacLeòid	Shortlist	
2019	Threads of Life	Clare Hunter	Winner	
2019	Seafarers: A Journey Among Birds	Stephen Rutt	Winner	
2019	Overlander: Bikepacking Coast to Coast Across the Heart of the Highlands	Alan Brown	Shortlist	
2019	Escape from Earth: A Secret History of the Space Rocket	Fraser MacDonald	Shortlist	
2019	A Superior Spectre	Angela Meyer	Shortlist	
2020	No award given			
2021	Bleak: The Mundane Comedy	Roddy Murray	Winner	
2021	Ray Harryhausen: Titan of Cinema	Vanessa Harryhausen	Shortlist	
2021	The Young Team	Graeme Armstrong	Shortlist	
2021	A Kind of Spark	Elle McNicoll	Shortlist	
2021	Mother, Nature	Aoife Lyall	Shortlist	
2021	If Rivers Could Sing	Keith Broomfield	Shortlist	
2022	In: The Graphic Novel	Will McPhail	Winner	
2022	A Sky Full of Kites	Tom Bowser	Shortlist	
2022	I Am Not Your Eve	Devika Ponnambalam	Shortlist	
2022	Limbo	Georgi Gill	Shortlist	
2022	The Second Sight of Zachary Cloudesley	Sean Lusk	Shortlist	
2022	The Voids	Ryan O’Connor	Shortlist	
2023	For Thy Great Pain Have Mercy on My Little Pain	Victoria MacKenzie	Winner	
2023	Confessions of a Highland Art Dealer	Tony Davidson	Shortlist	
2023	Ginger and Me	Elissa Soave	Shortlist	
2023	My Margaret, Your Toshie	Keith Adamson	Shortlist	
2023	The Maiden	Kate Foster	Shortlist	
2023	The Two-Headed Whale	Sandy Winterbottom	Shortlist	
2024	Night Train to Odesa	Jen Stout	Winner	
2024	Fragile Animals	Genevieve Jagger	Shortlist	
2024	Remember, Remember	Elle Machray	Shortlist	
2024	The Old Haunts	Allan Radcliffe	Shortlist	
2024	The Department of Work and Pensions Assesses a Jade Fish	Nualla Watt	Shortlist	
2025	Phantom Limb	Chris Kohler	Winner	
2025	Russia Starts Here	Howard Amos	Shortlist	
2025	Idle Grounds	Krystelle Bamford	Shortlist	
2025	Good Sons	Tim Craven	Shortlist	
2025	Foreign Fruit	Katie Goh	Shortlist	
2025	The Bone Folder	Cait O’Neill McCullagh	Shortlist	

=== Scottish Non-Fiction Book of the Year ===
The award for Non-Fiction Book of the Year was introduced in 2015

Year	Work	Author	Result	Ref(s)
2015	Adventures in Human Being	Gavin Francis	Winner	
2015	Young Eliot	Robert Crawford	Shortlist	
2015	Lifeblood	Gill Fyfe	Shortlist	
2015	This Is Scotland	Daniel Gray & Alan McCredie	Shortlist	
2016	Other People's Money	John Kay	Winner	
2016	A Little History of Religion	Richard Holloway	Shortlist	
2016	Fallen Glory	James Crawford	Shortlist	
2016	Glasgow: Mapping the City	John Moore	Shortlist	
2016	The Outrun	Amy Liptro	Shortlist	
2017	Border: A Journey to the Edge of Europe	Kapka Kassabova	Winner	
2017	Al Britannia, My Country: A Journey Through Muslim Britain	James Ferguson	Shortlist	
2017	Scotland: Mapping the Islands	edited by Christopher Fleet, Charles W.J. Withers, and Margaret Wilkes	Shortlist	
2017	Love of Country	Madeleine Bunting	Shortlist	
2017	Waypoints: Seascapes and Stories of Scotland's West Coast	Ian Stephen	Shortlist	
2017	The Passion of Harry Bingo: Further Dispatches from Unreported Scotland	Peter Ross	Shortlist	
2018	All That Remains: A Life in Death	Professor Sue Black	Winner	
2018	Appointment in Arezzo	Alan Taylor	Shortlist	
2018	Moscow Calling	Angus Roxburgh	Shortlist	
2018	Robert Louis Stevenson in Samoa	Joseph Farrell	Shortlist	
2018	The Story of Looking	Mark Cousins	Shortlist	
2018	Waiting for the Last Bus	Richard Holloway	Shortlist	
2019	The World I Fell Out Of	Melanie Reid	Winner	
2019	Some Kids I Taught and What They Taught Me	Kate Clanchy	Shortlist	
2019	Lowborn: Growing Up, Getting Away and Returning to Britain’s Poorest Towns	Kerry Hudson	Shortlist	
2019	Seòl Mo Bheatha (My Life Journey)	DòmhnallEachann Meek (Donald E. Meek)	Shortlist	
2019	Jane Haining: A Life of Love and Courage	Mary Miller	Shortlist	
2019	My Life with Murderers: Behind Bars with the World’s Most Violent Men	Dr David Wilson	Shortlist	
2020	No award given			
2021	A Tomb with a View	Peter Ross	Winner	
2021	Native: Life in a Vanishing Landscape	Patrick Laurie	Shortlist	
2021	Islands of Abandonment	Cal Flyn	Shortlist	
2021	Ruxton: The First Modern Murder	Tom Wood	Shortlist	
2021	The See-Through House: My Father in Full Colour	Shelley Klein	Shortlist	
2021	Checkpoint	Joe Donnelley	Shortlist	
2022	Homelands: The History of a Friendship	Chitra Ramaswamy	Winner	
2022	Alison Watt: A Portrait Without Likeness	Alison Watt	Shortlist	
2022	Alternatives to Valium	Alistair McKay	Shortlist	
2022	One Body	Catherine Simpson	Shortlist	
2022	The Eternal Season: A Journey Through Our Changing British Summer	Stephen Rutt	Shortlist	
2022	Seven Ways to Change the World	Gordon Brown	Shortlist	
2023	Womb: The Inside Story of Where We All Began	Leah Hazard	Winner	
2023	A Pebble in the Throat: Growing Up Between Two Continents	Aasmah Mir	Shortlist	
2023	Boy Friends	Michael Pederson	Shortlist	
2023	Avacado Anxiety	Louise Gray	Shortlist	
2023	The Edge of the Plain	James Crawford	Shortlist	
2024	Thunderclap	Laura Cumming	Winner	
2024	The Unfamiliar: A Queer Motherhood Memoir	Kirsty Logan	Shortlist	
2024	Already Too Late	Carl MacDougal	Shortlist	
2024	O Brother	John Niven	Shortlist	
2024	Ian Fleming: The Complete Man	Nicholas Shakespeare	Shortlist	
2025	My Good Bright Wolf	Sarah Moss	Winner	
2025	Russia Starts Here	Howard Amos	Shortlist	
2025	The Ayrshire Nestling	Gerry Cambridge	Shortlist	
2025	Ootlin	Jenni Fagan	Shortlist	
2025	Nature’s Genius	David Farrier	Shortlist	
2025	Foreign Fruit	Katie Goh	Shortlist	

=== Scottish Poetry Book of the Year ===
The award for Poetry Book of the Year was introduced in 2014.

Year	Work	Author	Result	Ref(s)
2014	Bones and Breath	Alexander Hutchison	Winner	
2014	All in One Breath	John Burnside	Shortlist	
2014	Byssus	Jen Hadfield	Shortlist	
2014	The Cartographer Tries to Map a Way to Zion	Kei Miller	Shortlist	
2014	At Maldon	J O Morgan	Shortlist	
2014	Locust and Marlin	J L Williams	Shortlist	
2015	Killochries	Jim Carruth	Winner	
2015	Cream of the Well	Valerie Gillies	Shortlist	
2015	Not All Honey	Roddy Lumsden	Shortlist	
2015	The Good Dark	Ryan Van Winkle	Shortlist	
2016	The Bonniest Companie	Kathleen Jamie	Winner	
2016	40 Sonets	Don Paterson	Shortlist	
2016	Galore	Peter MacKay	Shortlist	
2016	Interference Pattern	J O Morgan	Shortlist	
2016	This Far Back Everything Shimmers	Vicki Husband	Shortlist	
2016	The Golden Mean	John Glenday	Shortlist	
2017	Bird-Woman	Em Strang	Winner	
2017	Still Life with Feeding Snake	John Burnside	Shortlist	
2017	Farm By the Shore	Thomas A Clark	Shortlist	
2017	Twist	Pippa Little	Shortlist	
2017	In Search of Dustie-Fute	David Kinlock	Shortlist	
2017	Moon For Sale	Richard Price	Shortlist	
2018	Wristwatch	Jay Whittaker	Winner	
2018	Bantam	Jackie Kay	Shortlist	
2018	So Glad I'm Me	Roddy Lumsden	Shortlist	
2018	The Long Take	Robin Robertson	Shortlist	
2018	Who Is Mary Sue?	Sophie Collins	Shortlist	
2019	Hand Over Mouth Music	Janette Ayachi	Winner	
2019	The Games	Harry Josephine Giles	Shortlist	
2019	I'm a Pretty Circler	Iain Morrison	Shortlist	
2019	Moder Dy	Roseanne Watt	Shortlist	
2019	Ceum air Cheum	Christopher Whyte	Shortlist	
2019	Line Drawings	Ross Wilson	Shortlist	
2020	No award given			
2021	Life Without Air	Daisy Lafarge	Winner	
2021	Nàdar De (Some Kind Of)	Padraigh Macaoidh (Patrick Mackay)	Shortlist	
2021	The Threadbare Coat	Thomas A Clark	Shortlist	
2021	Clydebuilt	Owen Gallagher	Shortlist	
2021	Ben Dorain	Garry Mackenzie	Shortlist	
2021	Later That Day	Andrew Greig	Shortlist	
2022	How to Burn a Woman	Claire Askew	Winner	
2022	At Least This I Know	Andrés N Ordorica	Shortlist	
2022	Blood Salt Spring	Hannah Lavery	Shortlist	
2022	Polaris	Marcas Mac an Tuairneir	Shortlist	
2022	The Luna Erratum	Maria Sledmere	Shortlist	
2023	Dastram / Delirium	Taylor Strickland	Winner	
2023	Another Way to Split Water	Alycia Pirmoham	Shortlist	
2023	Burning Season	Yvonne Reddick	Shortlist	
2023	The Swailing	Patrick James Errington	Shortlist	
2023	Too Hot to Sleep	Elspeth Wilson	Shortlist	
2024	RUIN, BLOSSOM	John Burnside	Winner	
2024	Quick Fire, Slow Burning	Janet Ayachi	Shortlist	
2024	May Day	Jackie Kay	Shortlist	
2024	The Wrong Person To Ask	Marjorie Lotfi	Shortlist	
2024	Three Births	K Patrick	Shortlist	
2024	The Cat Prince: & Other Poems	Michael Pederson	Shortlist	
2025	Polkadot Wounds	Anthony Vahni Capildeo	Winner	
2025	I Sugar the Bones	Juana Adcock	Shortlist	
2025	The Island in the Sound	Niall Campbell	Shortlist	
2025	Good Sons	Tim Craven	Shortlist	
2025	The Keelie Hawk	Kathleen Jamie	Shortlist	
2025	The Bone Folder	Cait O’Neill McCullagh	Shortlist	

=== Scottish History Book of the Year ===
The award for History Book of the Year was established in 1965 in honour of the historian Agnes Mure Mackenzie (1891–1955). It was only awarded intermittently until 1994 when it became an annual award. It has not been awarded since 2023.

Year	Work	Author	Ref(s)
1965	Robert Bruce	G W S Barrow	
1974	Kings and Kingship in Early Scotland	Marjorie O Anderson	
1975	Scottish Banking: A History 1695-1973	Sydney Checkland	
1977	Scottish Population History	M Flinn, P T C Smout, Rosalind Mitchison, Judith Gillespie, Nancy Hill, Ailsa Maxwell	
1982	Thomas Chalmers and the Godly Commonwealth	Stewart J. Brown	
1986	A Century of the Scottish People 1830–1950	T. C. Smout	
1994	James I	Michael Brown	
1995	The Great Highland Famine	Tom Devine	
1996	No award given		
1997	The Early Stewart Kings: Robert II and Robert III 1371–1406	Stephen Boardman	
1998	The Identity of the Scottish Nation	William Ferguson	
1999	Patrick Sellar and the Highland Clearances: Homicide, Eviction and the Price of Progress	Eric Richards	
2000	The Rough Wooings: Mary Queen of Scots 1542–1551	Marcus Merriman	
2001	The Late Medieval Scottish Parliament: Politics and the Three Estates 1424–1488	Roland Tanner	
2002	The Culture of Protestantism in Early Modern Scotland	Margo Todd	
2004	Adventurers and Exiles: The Great Scottish Exodus	Marjory Harper	
2005	David II	Michael Penman	
2006	Native Lordships in Medieval Scotland: The Earldoms of Strathearn and Lennox c.1140–1365	Cynthia J. Neville	
2006	Scotland's Historic Heraldry	Bruce A. McAndrew	
2007	The Scots and the Union	Christopher Whatley	

Year	Work	Author	Result	Ref(s)
2008	From Pictland to Alba 789–1070	Alex Woolf	Winner	
2008	Bannockburn: The Scottish War and the British Isles, 1307 - 1323	Michael Brown	Shortlist	
2008	Portmahomack: Monastery of the Picts	Martin Carver	Shortlist	
2008	Iron Road: The Railway In Scotland	PJG Ramsden	Shortlist	
2009	A History of Scottish Philosophy	Alexander Broadie	Winner	
2009	From Caledonia to Pictland Scotland to 795	James E Fraser	Shortlist	
2009	Edinburgh: A History of the City	Michael Fry	Shortlist	
2009	Homage to Caledonia	Daniel Gray	Shortlist	
2009	From Peat Bog to Conifer Forest	Ruth Tittlensor	Shortlist	
2010	Whaur Extremes Meet: Scotland's Twentieth Century	Catriona M. M. MacDonald	Winner	
2010	lmpaled Upon a Thistle Since 1880, New Edinburgh History of Scotland	Ewan A Cameron	Shortlist	
2010	Famine in Scotland: The 'Ill Years' of the 1690s	Karen J Cullen	Shortlist	
2010	So Foul and Fair a Day A History of Scotland's Weather and Climate	Alistair Dawson	Shortlist	
2010	Mighty Subjects The Dunbar Earls in Scotland c. 1072-1289	Elsa Hamilton	Shortlist	
2010	The Visions of Isobel Gowdie Magic, Witchcraft and Dark Shamanism in Seventeenth Century Scotland	Emma Wilby	Shortlist	
2011	The Inner Life of Empires: An Eighteenth Century History	Emma Rothschild	Winner	
2011	Scottish Ethnicity and the Making of New Zealand Society	Tanya Bueltmann	Shortlist	
2011	To the Ends of the Earth: Scotland's Global Diaspora, 1750-2010	T M Devine	Shortlist	
2011	Elite Women and Polite Society in 18th Century Scotland	Katharine Glover	Shortlist	
2011	Andrew Melville and Humanism in Renaissance Scotland 1545-1622	Ernest R Holloway III	Shortlist	
2011	Men of Spirit and Enterprise	Suzanne Rigg	Shortlist	
2011	Reading the Scottish Enlightenment: Books & their Readers in Provincial Scotland, 1750-1820	Mark Towsey	Shortlist	
2011	Enlightened Evangelicalism - The Life and Thought of John Erskine	Jonathan M Yeagher	Shortlist	
2012	A Military History of Scotland	E. Spiers, J. Crang and M. Strickland (editors)	Winner	
2012	Women of Morray	S. Bennett, M. Byatt, J. Main, A. Oliver, J. Trythall	Shortlist	
2012	Scotland's Radical Export - The Scots Abroad- How they Shaped Politics and Trade Unions	Pat Kelly	Shortlist	
2012	Scotland's First Oil Boom - The Scottish Shale-Oil Industry, 1851–1914	John MacKay	Shortlist	
2012	The Two Unions: Ireland, Scotland, and the Survival of the United Kingdom, 1707-2007	Alvin Jackson	Shortlist	
2013	An Enlightened Duke: The Life of Archibald Campbell (1682–1761), Earl of Ilay, 3rd Duke of Argyll	Roger L. Emerson	Winner	
2013	Death,Life and Religious Change in Scottish Towns, C. 1350 – 1560	Mairi Cowan	Shortlist	
2013	Scotland No More? The Scots who left Scotland in the Twentieth Century	Marjory Harper	Shortlist	
2013	The Firth of the Forth: An Environmental History	T C Smout and Mairi Stewart	Shortlist	
2013	Annie's Loo: the Govan origins of Scotland's Community Based Housing Associations	Raymond Young	Shortlist	
2014	Scottish Gods, Religion in the Modern Scotland 1900–2012	Steve Bruce	Winner	
2014	Cosmo Innes and the Defence of Scotland's Past	Richard A Marsden	Shortlist	
2014	Governing Gaeldom:The Scottish Highlands and the Restoration State, 1600-1688	Allan Kennedy	Shortlist	
2014	A New Race of Men	Michael Fry	Shortlist	
2014	Painting the Town: Scottish Urban History in Art	E P Dennison, S Eydmann, A Lyell, M Lynch & S Stronach	Shortlist	
2015	A Chasm in Time – Scottish War Art and Artists in the Twentieth Century	Patricia R. Andrew	Winner	
2015	A History of Drinking: The Scottish Pub since 1700	Anthony Cook	Shortlist	
2015	John Knox	Jane Dawson	Shortlist	
2015	The Going Down of the Sun: The Great War and a Rural Lewis Community	Donald A Robinson (editor)	Shortlist	
2016	Set Adrift Upon the World	James Hunter	Winner	
2016	A Tale of Three Cities	Bob Harris	Shortlist	
2016	Castles in the Mist	Robin Noble	Shortlist	
2016	Oil Strike North Sea	Mike Stephen	Shortlist	
2016	Shetland and the Great War	Linda K. Riddell	Shortlist	
2016	St Kilda	A Gannon Geddes	Shortlist	
2017	No award given			
2018	The Drowned and the Saved	Les Wilson	Winner	
2018	Sir David Nairne. The Life of a Scottish Jacobite at the Court of the Exiled Stuarts	Edward Corp	Shortlist	
2018	Scotland's Populations from the 1850s to Today	Michael Anderson	Shortlist	
2018	Scots & Catalans: Union and Disunion	J H Elliott	Shortlist	
2018	Scottish Presbyterianism and Settler Colonial Politics: Empire of Dissent	Valerie Wallace	Shortlist	
2019	Alexander III, 1249–1286: First Among Equals	Norman Reid	Winner	
2019	John Law, A Scottish Adventurer of the Eighteenth Century	James Buchan	Shortlist	
2019	The Sea Kings: The Late Norse Kingdoms of Man and the Isles, c.1066-1275	R Andrew Macdonald	Shortlist	
2019	The Darkest Dawn: The Story of the Iolaire	Malcolm Macdonald and Donald John MacLeod	Shortlist	
2019	Lord Seaforth, Highland Landowner, Caribbean Governor	Finlay McKichan	Shortlist	
2019	Frederick Douglass and Scotland: Living an Antislavery Life	Alasdair Pettinger	Shortlist	
2020	No award given			
2021	Stuart Style: Monarchy, Dress and the Scottish Male Elite	Maria Hayward	Winner	
2021	History with Heart and Soul	Ness Historical Society Editorial Team with Rachel Barrowman	Shortlist	
2021	Coal Country: The Meaning and Memory of Deindustrialization in Postwar Scotland	Ewan Gibbs	Shortlist	
2021	Union and Revolution: Scotland and Beyond 1625 – 1745	Laura Stewart and Janay Nugent	Shortlist	
2021	David I: King of Scots 1124 – 1153	Richard Oram	Shortlist	
2021	Gaelic Influence in the Northumbrian Kingdom: The Golden Age and the Viking Age	Fiona Edmonds	Shortlist	
2022	Slaves and Highlanders: Silenced Histories of Scotland and the Caribbean	David Alston	Winner	
2022	Blood Legacy: Reckoning with a Family's History of Slavery	Alex Renton	Shortlist	
2022	Mael Coluim III, Canmore	Neil McGuigan	Shortlist	
2022	R.B. Cunninghame Graham and Scotland: Party, Prose, and Political Aesthetic	Lachlan Gow Munro	Shortlist	
2022	Embroidering Her Truth	Clare Hunter	Shortlist	
2022	Putting the Tea in Britain	Les Wilson	Shortlist	
2023	The People Are Not There: The Transformation of Badenoch 1800–1863	David Taylor	Winner	
2023	The Material Landscapes of Scotland's Jewellery Craft, 1780-1914	Sarah Laurenson	Shortlist	
2023	Majestic River: Mungo Park and the Exploration of the Niger	Charles Withers	Shortlist	
2023	One Mans Legacy: Tom Patey	Mike Dixon	Shortlist	
2023	The Whalers of Harris	Ian Hart	Shortlist	
2023	The Early Life of James VI: A Long Apprenticeship, 1566–1585	Stephen J. Reid	Shortlist	
2024	No award given			
2025	No award given			

=== Scottish Research Book of the Year ===
This award was initiated in 1998, and is made jointly by the Saltire Society and the National Library of Scotland. It aims to recognise books which "represent a significant body of research and offer new insight or dimension to the subject".

Year	Work	Author	Ref(s)
1998	The Edinburgh History of the Scots Language	Charles Jones	
1999	The Poems of William Dunbar (Volumes I & II)	Priscilla Bawcutt	
2000	Jessie Kesson: Writing her Life	Isobel Murray	
2000	The Highland Pipe and Scottish Society	William Donaldson	
2001	The Scottish Book Trade 1500−1720	Alastair J. Mann	
2002	Sorley MacLean, Poems to Eimhir	Christopher Whyte (editor)	
2002	Public Sculpture of Glasgow	Ray McKenzie	
2003	The Greig-Duncan Folk Song Collection	Emily B. Lyle and Katherine Campbell	
2004	The Last of England?	Randall Stevenson	
2004	Maritime Enterprise and Empire: Sir William MacKinnon and his Business Network 1823–1893	J. Forbes Munro	
2005	Weights and Measures in Scotland	R. D. Connor and A. D. C. Simpson, edited by Alison Morrison-Low	
2006	Dùthchas Nan Gàidheal: Selected Essays of John MacInnes	Michael Newton	

Year	Work	Author	Result	Ref(s)
2007	Scotland's Books: The Penguin History of Scottish Literature	Robert Crawford	Winner	
2007	Auld Campaigner, A Life of Alexander Scott	David Robb	Winner	
2007	Heart and Soul The Arts and Crafts Movement in Scotland	Elizabeth Hand Cumming	Short Leet	
2007	James Hogg, A Life	Gillian Hughes	Short Leet	
2007	Crofts Land of Mountain and Flood	Gordon McKirdy	Short Leet	
2007	The Flowers of the Forest, Scotland and the First World War	Trevor Royle	Short Leet	
2007	The Scots and the Union	Christopher Whatley	Short Leet	
2008	Scott's Shadow: The Novel in Romantic Edinburgh	Ian Duncan	Winner	
2008	Scottish Life and Society: A compendium of Scottish Ethnology: Volume 5: The Food of the Scots	Alexander Fenton	Shortlist	
2008	A Floating Commonwealth: Politics, Culture, and Technology on Britain's Atlantic Coast, 1860-1930	Christopher Harvie	Shortlist	
2009	Historical Thesaurus of the Oxford English Dictionary	Christian Kay, Jane Roberts, Michael Samuels and Irené Wotherspoon	Winner	
2010	Robert Burns & Pastoral: Poetry and Improvement in Late Eighteenth-Century Scotland	Nigel Leask	Winner	
2010	Adam Smith: An Enlightened Life	Nicholas Phillipson	Winner	
2010	The Scots Imagination and Modern Memory	Andrew Blaikie	Shortlist	
2010	Robert Owen	Robert Davis & Frank O'Hagan	Shortlist	
2010	Charles Rennie Mackintosh: A Biography	James MacAuley	Shortlist	
2010	Land, Law and People in Medieval Scotland	Cynthia Neville	Shortlist	
2010	The Lore of Scotland: A Guide to Scottish Legends	Jennifer Westwood & Sophia Kingshill	Shortlist	
2011	Beyond the Last Dragon: A Life of Edwin Morgan	James McGonigal	Winner	
2011	Noble Power in Scotland from the Reformation to the Revolution	Keith M Brown	Shortlist	
2011	The History of the Scottish Parliament	Keith M Brown & Alan R MacDonald	Shortlist	
2011	Scottish Ethnicity and the making of New Zealand Society, 1850-1930	Tanja Bueltmann	Shortlist	
2011	To the Ends of the Earth: Scotland’s Global Diaspora, 1750-2010	T M Devine	Shortlist	
2011	George Mackay Brown: The Wound and the Gift	Ron Ferguson	Shortlist	
2011	Domination and Lordship Scotland 1070-1230	Richard Oram	Shortlist	
2012	Scotland: Mapping the Nation	C. Fleet, C. Withers and M. Wilkes	Winner	
2012	The Sexual State - Sexuality and Scottish Governance 1950-80	R. Davidson & G. Davis	Shortlist	
2012	The Grand Designer	Rosemary Hannah	Shortlist	
2012	Dear Grieve: Letter to Hugh MacDiarmid	John Mansen	Shortlist	
2012	Jamieson's Dictionary of Scots	Susan Rennie	Shortlist	
2013	The Sunlit Summit: The Life of W. H. Murray	Robin Lloyd-Jones	Winner	
2013	A Dictionary of Scottish Phrase and Fable	Ain Crofton	Shortlist	
2013	Visions of Britain, 1730-1830	Sebastian Mitchell	Shortlist	
2013	Nancy Brysson Morrison: A Literary Life	Mary Seenan	Shortlist	
2014	The Scottish Town in the Age of Enlightenment 1740–1820	Bob Harris and Charles McKean	Winner	
2014	The Eagles Way	Jim Crumley	Shortlist	
2014	The K2 Man (and his Molluscs)	Catherine Moorehead	Shortlist	
2014	Material Culture and Sedition 1688—1760	Murray Pittock	Shortlist	
2014	Lexical Variation and Attrition in the Scottish Fishing Communities	Robert McColl Millar, William Barras & Lisa Maria Bonnici	Shortlist	
2014	Landscapes of Protest in the Scottish Highlands after 1914	Iain J M Robertson	Shortlist	
2015	Clubbing Together: Ethnicity, Civility and Formal Sociability in the Scottish Diaspora to 1930	Tanja Bueltmann	Winner	
2015	Microbes and the Fetlar Man: The Life of Sir William Watson Cheyne	Jane Coutts	Shortlist	
2015	The Voice of the People: Hamish Henderson and Scottish Cultural Politics	Corey Gibson	Shortlist	
2015	The Native Woodlands of Scotland	Scott Wilson	Shortlist	
2016	The Literary Culture of Early Modern Scotland	Sebastiaan Verweij	Winner	
2016	Vikings in Islay: The Place of Names in Hebridean Settlement History	Alan McNiven	Shortlist	
2016	James Hogg and British Romanticism: A Kaleidoscopic Art	Meiko O'Halloran	Shortlist	
2016	Scottish Arctic Whaling 1750-WWI	Chesley Sanger	Shortlist	
2016	The Wild Black Region: Badenock 1750-1800	David Taylor	Shortlist	
2017	The Light Blue Book: 500 Years of Gaelic Love and Transgressive Verse	Peter Mackay & Iain MacPherson	Winner	
2017	The Campbells of the Ark: Men of Argyll in 1745 (Vol I and II)	Ronald Black	Shortlist	
2017	Muslims in Scotland: The Making of Community in a Post-9/11 World	Stefano Bonino	Shortlist	
2017	History as Theatrical Metaphor	Ian Brown	Shortlist	
2017	Immortal Memory: Burns and the Scottish People	Christopher Whatley	Shortlist	
2018	What the Victorians Made of Romanticism: Material Artifacts, Cultural Practices, and Reception History	Tom Mole	Winner	
2018	Early Cinema in Scotland	John Caughie, Trevor Griffiths and María A. Vélez-Serna	Shortlist	
2018	Literature and Union: Scottish Texts, British Contexts	Gerard Carruthers and Colin Kidd	Shortlist	
2018	Tea and Empire: James Taylor in Victorian Ceylon	Angela McCarthy and Sir Tom Devine	Shortlist	
2018	The Chair of Verity: Political Preaching and Pulpit Censure in Eighteenth-century Scotland	Ronald Lyndsay Crawford	Shortlist	
2019	Working Verse in Victorian Scotland: Poetry, Press, Community	Kirstie Blair	Winner	
2019	The Scottish Clearances: A History of the Dispossessed, 1600-1900	T M Devine	Shortlist	
2019	Energy at the End of the World: An Orkney Islands Saga	Laura Watts	Shortlist	
2020	No award given			
2021	Darkness Visible: The Sculptor’s Cave, Covesa, from the Bronze Age to the Picts	Ian Armit and Lindsey Buster	Winner	
2021	Gaelic in Scotland: Politics, Movements, Ideologies	Wilson McLeod	Shortlist	
2021	Stepping Westward	Nigel Leask	Shortlist	
2021	Terrorists, Anarchists and Republicans	Richard Whatmore	Shortlist	
2021	The Changing Outer Hebrides	Frank Rennie	Shortlist	
2022	Surveying the Anthropocene: Environment and Photography Now	(ed) Patricia Macdonald	Winner	
2022	A Long and Tangled Saga	Bob Chambers	Shortlist	
2022	Ainmean Tuineachaidh Leòdhais /The Settlement Names of Lewis	Richard A v Cox	Shortlist	
2022	Recovering Scottish History: John Hill Burton and Scottish National Identity in the Nineteenth Century	Craig Beveridge	Shortlist	
2022	Scripting the Nation: Court Poetry and the Authority of History in Late Medieval Scotland	Kathernie H Terrell	Shortlist	
2023	The Old Red Sandstone, or, New Walks in an Old Field	Hugh Miller	Winner	
2023	Mousa to Mackintosh: The Scottishness of Scottish Architecture	Frank Arneil Walker	Shortlist	
2023	Cha Till Mise	Ruaraidh G MacIlleathain	Shortlist	
2023	Politics and the People: Scotland, 1945–1979	Malcolm Petrie	Shortlist	
2023	Scotland's Lascar Heritage	various	Shortlist	
2023	French Paintings 1500–1900	Michael Clarke and Frances Fowle	Shortlist	
2024	England’s Insular Imagining	Lorna Hudson	Winner	
2024	Somhairle MacGill-Eathain na Bhriathran Fhèin	Mairi Sìne Chaimbeul, Jo NicDhòmhnaill & Iseabail NicGill-Eain	Shortlist	
2024	The Afterlife of Mary, Queen of Scots	Stephen J Reid	Shortlist	
2024	Salt: Scotland’s Newest Oldest Industry	eds. Christopher A. Whatley, Joanna Hambly	Shortlist	
2024	Scotland's Royal Women and European Literary Culture, 1424 – 1587	Emily Wingfield	Shortlist	
2025	Art Deco Scotland	Bruce Peter	Winner	
2025	Plagues of the Heart: Crisis and Covenanting in a Seventeenth-Century Scottish Town	Michelle D Brock	Shortlist	
2025	Neil MacCormick: A Life in Politics, Philosophy and Law	Maksymilian Del Mar	Shortlist	
2025	History of a Revoluter: The life of James Lesley Mitchell/Lewis Grassic Gibbon	William K Malcolm	Shortlist	
2025	Burns and Black Lives	Clark McGinn	Shortlist	

== See also ==
- Scottish literature
- Scottish Mortgage Investment Trust Book Awards, formerly the Scottish Arts Council Book Awards
- List of history awards
- List of literary awards
- List of awards named after people
