= Neylak =

Neylak or Nilak (Persian: نيلك) may refer to:

- Neylak, Kermanshah
- Nilak, Sistan and Baluchestan
- Neylak, Khash, Sistan and Baluchestan Province
