= Kiln (disambiguation) =

A kiln is a thermally insulated chamber, a type of oven.

Kiln or KILN may also refer to:

== Arts and entertainment ==
- Kiln (band), an American ambient music trio
- "Kiln" (poem), an Ancient Greek poem
- The Kiln, a 1996 novel by William McIlvanney
- Kiln People, a 2002 science fiction novel by David Brin
- KILN-LP (99.1 FM), a radio station in Alturas, California, US
- Kiln (video game), 2026 video game

== Businesses ==
- Kiln (restaurant), a Michelin-starred restaurant in San Francisco, California

== Places ==
- Kiln, Iran
- Kiln, Mississippi, US
- Wilmington Air Park (ICAO code), Wilmington, Ohio, US
- Kiln Theatre, a theatre in Kilburn, London Borough of Brent, England
- The Kilns, a house in Risinghurst, Oxford, England, owned by C.S. Lewis

== See also ==
- Kyln, a fictional prison in the Marvel Universe
