= Association for Scottish Literary Studies =

Scottish educational charity

ASLS logo

The Association for Scottish Literary Studies (ASLS) is a Scottish educational charity, founded in 1970 to promote and support the teaching, study and writing of Scottish literature. Its founding members included the Scottish literary scholar Matthew McDiarmid (1914–1996). Originally based at the University of Aberdeen, it moved to its current home within the University of Glasgow in 1996. In November 2015, ASLS was allocated £40,000 by the Scottish Government to support its work providing teacher training and classroom resources for schools.

ASLS's main field of activity is publishing, and the organisation is a member of Publishing Scotland.

== Publications ==
=== Periodicals ===
ASLS produces periodicals, including Scottish Literary Review (formerly Scottish Studies Review), a peer reviewed journal of Scottish literature and cultural studies; Scottish Language, a peer reviewed journal of Scottish languages and linguistics; The International Journal of Scottish Literature, a free online peer reviewed journal (2006–2013); and The Bottle Imp, a free online ezine (named after the short story by Robert Louis Stevenson). Since June 2013, Scottish Literary Review has been included in Project MUSE's Premium Collection of journals.

=== Books ===
==== Annual Volumes ====
Since 1971 ASLS has republished a number of out of print Scottish texts in their Annual Volumes series (45 volumes by 2016). Titles in the series include reprints of 18th- and 19th-century fiction, anthologies of Scottish drama, editions of poetry and collections of other writings. Two ASLS Annual Volumes have won Saltire Society Research Book of the Year awards: The Poems of William Dunbar, edited by Priscilla Bawcutt (1998), and Sorley MacLean's Dàin do Eimhir, edited by Christopher Whyte (2002).

==== International Companions to Scottish Literature ====
In 2015, ASLS launched the International Companions to Scottish Literature series, co-edited by Ian Brown and Thomas Owen Clancy. Titles in the series to date include The International Companion to Lewis Grassic Gibbon, The International Companion to Edwin Morgan, The International Companion to Scottish Poetry, The International Companion to James Macpherson and The Poems of Ossian, The International Companion to John Galt, The International Companion to Scottish Literature 1400–1650, The International Companion to Scottish Literature of the Long Eighteenth Century, and The International Companion to Nineteenth-Century Scottish Literature.

==== New Writing Scotland ====
Since its first issue in 1983, many contemporary Scottish writers have had early work published in ASLS's annual anthology of new short fiction and poetry, New Writing Scotland, including Leila Aboulela, Lin Anderson, Iain Banks, Polly Clark, Anne Donovan, Janice Galloway, Kris Haddow, Jane Harris, Gail Honeyman, Kathleen Jamie, A. L. Kennedy, James Meek, Ian Rankin, James Robertson, Suhayl Saadi, Ali Smith, Chiew-Siah Tei, Irvine Welsh, and others. New Writing Scotland is part-funded by Creative Scotland.

==== Occasional Papers ====
The ASLS Occasional Papers series publishes essays and monographs on Scottish literary and linguistic topics, often based on papers presented at ASLS conferences. The most recent edition in this series, number 25, is entitled Christianity in Scottish Literature.

==== Scotnotes ====
ASLS publishes the Scotnotes series of study guides to Scottish writers and their literary works. There are currently thirty-nine titles in this series, on authors ranging from late medieval poets such as William Dunbar and Robert Henryson to contemporary writers such as Iain Banks, Liz Lochhead and Ian Rankin.

==== Other titles ====
In May 2010, in partnership with the Loch Lomond and The Trossachs National Park, ASLS published an illustrated edition of Sir Walter Scott's narrative poem The Lady of the Lake, to mark the 200th anniversary of the original publication.

In June 2011, with financial support from the Gaelic Books Council, ASLS published a new edition of Sorley MacLean's An Cuilithionn/The Cuillin.

In February 2013, ASLS hosted the inaugural Dr Gavin Wallace Fellowship, set up by Creative Scotland "to enable a writer to take time out of their usual environment to embark upon a year-long literary adventure to develop their practice". Kirsty Logan was selected to be the first recipient of the Fellowship, and on 10 August 2015 ASLS published her collection of short stories A Portable Shelter.

In June 2023, ASLS published two volumes of plays by Michel Tremblay, translated into Scots by Martin Bowman and Bill Findlay.

== Exhibitions ==
From 2004 to 2019, ASLS mounted the Scottish Writing Exhibition at the Modern Language Association of America's annual conventions in the United States. In August 2008 the Scottish Writing Exhibition was on display at the biannual European Society for the Study of English (ESSE) conference in Aarhus in Denmark.

== Presidents ==
A number of literary scholars have held the presidency of the ASLS:

- John MacQueen (1970–1973)
- Tom Dunn (1973–1976)
- Alexander Scott (1976–1979)
- David Daiches (1979–1984)
- Tom Crawford (1984–1989)
- Maurice Lindsay (1989–1993)
- John Blackburn (1993–1994)
- David Robb (1994–1998)
- Dorothy McMillan (1998–2002)
- Alan MacGillivray (2002–2006)
- Alan Riach (2006–2010)
- Ian Brown (2010–2015)
- Alison Lumsden (2015–2019)
- David Goldie (2019–)

== Awards ==
To date, two ASLS Annual Volumes have won Saltire Society Research Book of the Year awards: The Poems of William Dunbar, edited by Priscilla Bawcutt (1998); and Sorley MacLean's Dàin do Eimhir, edited by Christopher Whyte (2002).

In 2011, the ASLS's edition of Sorley MacLean's An Cuilithionn/The Cuillin, edited by Christopher Whyte, was shortlisted for the Saltire Society Scottish Book of the Year award.

Also in 2011, along with VisitScotland and the University of Glasgow, the ASLS co-produced Literary Scotland: A Traveller's Guide. In October 2011, this publication won the Chartered Institute of Public Relations Scotland Gold Award for Best Publication.

In 2021, the ASLS Annual Volume Dràma na Gàidhlig: Ceud Bliadhna air an Àrd-ùrlar / A Century of Gaelic Drama, edited by Michelle Macleod, won the Gaelic Books Council Donald Meek Award for Best Non-Fiction.

== See also ==
- Scottish literature
