= Chris Kohler =

Scottish writer

- Born: Glasgow, Scotland
- Occupation: Author
- Writing career
- Genres: Literary fiction, magical realism
- Notable work: Phantom Limb (2024)
- Notable awards: Saltire Society Literary Award for Fiction Debut of the Year (2025)

Chris Kohler is a Scottish author from Glasgow. He is the author of the novel Phantom Limb (2024). In 2025, the book won the Saltire Society Literary Award for Fiction Debut of the Year.

== Career ==
Kohler's short stories have appeared in literary magazines including 3:AM Magazine, Egress, The Stinging Fly, The Moth, Gutter, Dark Mountain, and Minor Literatures, and have been broadcast on BBC radio. He was shortlisted for the V.S. Pritchett Short Story Prize in 2023.

Kohler's first novel, Phantom Limb, was published in 2024. The novel is set in Scotland and incorporates elements of satire and the supernatural, drawing on historical material from the Scottish Reformation.

== Reception ==
The Guardian described Phantom Limb as laying out "a bleakly comical vision of modern life", and praised its "considerable charm and energy". The Daily Telegraph described it as a novel about "miraculous happenings in a faithless world" and called it "disturbing and mesmerising". The Scotsman praised Kohler's "promisingly eldritch imagination". The Spectator Australia reviewed the novel in August 2024 under the title "A miracle beckons".

The novel was shortlisted for Scotland's National Book Awards Scottish Fiction Book of the Year and won the Scottish Fiction Debut of the Year.

== Bibliography ==
- Phantom Limb (2024, Atlantic Books, ISBN 978-1-8054-6081-7)
