= The History of Orkney Literature =

2010 book by Simon W. Hall

- 2010 edition
- Author: Simon W. Hall
- Cover artist: James Hutcheson, Wally Gilbert
- Language: English
- Subject: Scottish Literature
- Genre: Non-fiction
- Publisher: John Donald Publishers
- Publication date: 2010
- Publication place: Scotland
- Media type: Print paperback)
- Pages: 224
- ISBN: 978-1-906566-21-0

The History of Orkney Literature is the first book by Scottish academic Simon W. Hall. The book was first published in May 2010 by Edinburgh-based publisher John Donald, an imprint of Birlinn Limited. It was joint winner of the 2010 Saltire Society First Book Award.

== Summary ==
The book is the first examination and exploration of literary works from, or otherwise focused on, the islands of Orkney in Scotland. The published works of key Orcadian poets and novelists such as George Mackay Brown and Edwin Muir are prominently assessed. Hall also evaluates the myriad influences on the development of literature in Orkney, exploring the role of the archipelago's Nordic roots and its historical reliance on fishing, farming and foreign trade.

== Critical reception ==
The book received a highly favourable reception from critics. The Scotsman said: "Hall is assiduous in considering Orkney's literature from its imposing and varied angles", and that the "Orkney literary tapestry" has "a lot to recommend it to the common reader". The International Journal of Scottish Literature praised what it perceived as a "prime example of literary history", noting that it will be seen as "the authoritative guide to a specifically Orcadian mapping of universal humanity".

For Orkney Today, the book is: "A treasure trove of suggestion and inspiration for further reading, study and writing". The book was named joint winner of the Saltire Society First Book Award 2010.
