= Keep Walking, Rhona Beech =

Novel by Kate Tough

Head for the Edge, Keep Walking
- First edition
- Author: Kate Tough
- Language: English, Scots, Glaswegian
- Publisher: Cargo Publishing
- Publication date: 1 January 2014
- Publication place: Scotland
- Media type: Paperback
- Pages: 280
- ISBN: 1908885580

Keep Walking, Rhona Beech (2019, Abacus) is the debut novel by Scottish author Kate Tough. The novel was previously published in slightly different form in 2014 under the title Head for the Edge, Keep Walking.

== Plot summary ==
Keep Walking, Rhona Beech is the witty but unsentimental story of a woman in her mid 30s watching her plans unravel. Just out of a nine-year relationship Rhona Beech embarks on a laugh (and cry) out-loud search for meaning amongst the bars, workplaces and NHS clinics of Glasgow. At once funny and tender, Keep Walking, Rhona Beech is a clear-sighted look at a generation of women that was told they could ‘have it all’.

== Critical reception ==
Keep Walking, Rhona Beech and Head for the Edge, Keep Walking received positive reviews and both have a five star rating on Amazon

Zoe Strachan called it ‘A warm and ferociously witty story of the s**t life throws at us and how we survive it. Truth rings from every page of this assured and engrossing debut.’

The Lady (magazine) wrote that 'This beautifully written, gritty and funny satire about female friendship, sadness and illness should appeal to fans of TV series Fleabag...its taut and unflinchingly candid narrative holds the reader’s attention. At first I wrongly classed it as chick-lit, but it is much more profound. Pack it for your next holiday.'

‘[Rhona] Beech – sharp-eyed, laconic-tongued, tender-hearted – is your new eccentric best friend. She makes a terrific debut in this witty, chatty, lyrical novel. You can trust her. Head for the edge, keep reading.’ Kevin MacNeil, author of The Stornoway Way and Love and Zen in the Outer Hebrides. ‘Kate Tough’s dry wit and keen observations make this eye-catching debut about a defining moment in the life of thirty-something Jill Beech. Both laugh-out-loud funny as well as poignant. She gets the balance between the weighty and the trivial just right, and if we laugh at what we recognise, we also mourn what, and whom, we might have lost.’ Lesley MacDowall

‘I would like Beech to be my friend. I lingered over some chapters because I wanted to spend longer with her. I read some chapters quickly because like a friend sharing gossip, I couldn’t wait to discover what happened next. When Jill’s story came to an end, I missed her; I wanted to know what she was doing… what she was thinking. This is not a typical break up book. Jill’s unpredictable, frustrating, and funny life made me laugh, and cry, and remember. Just like a good friend.’ Gutter magazine

== Excerpted publication ==
The novel appeared in excerpted form in The Scotsman and The Sunday Times.
