= Helen Sedgwick =

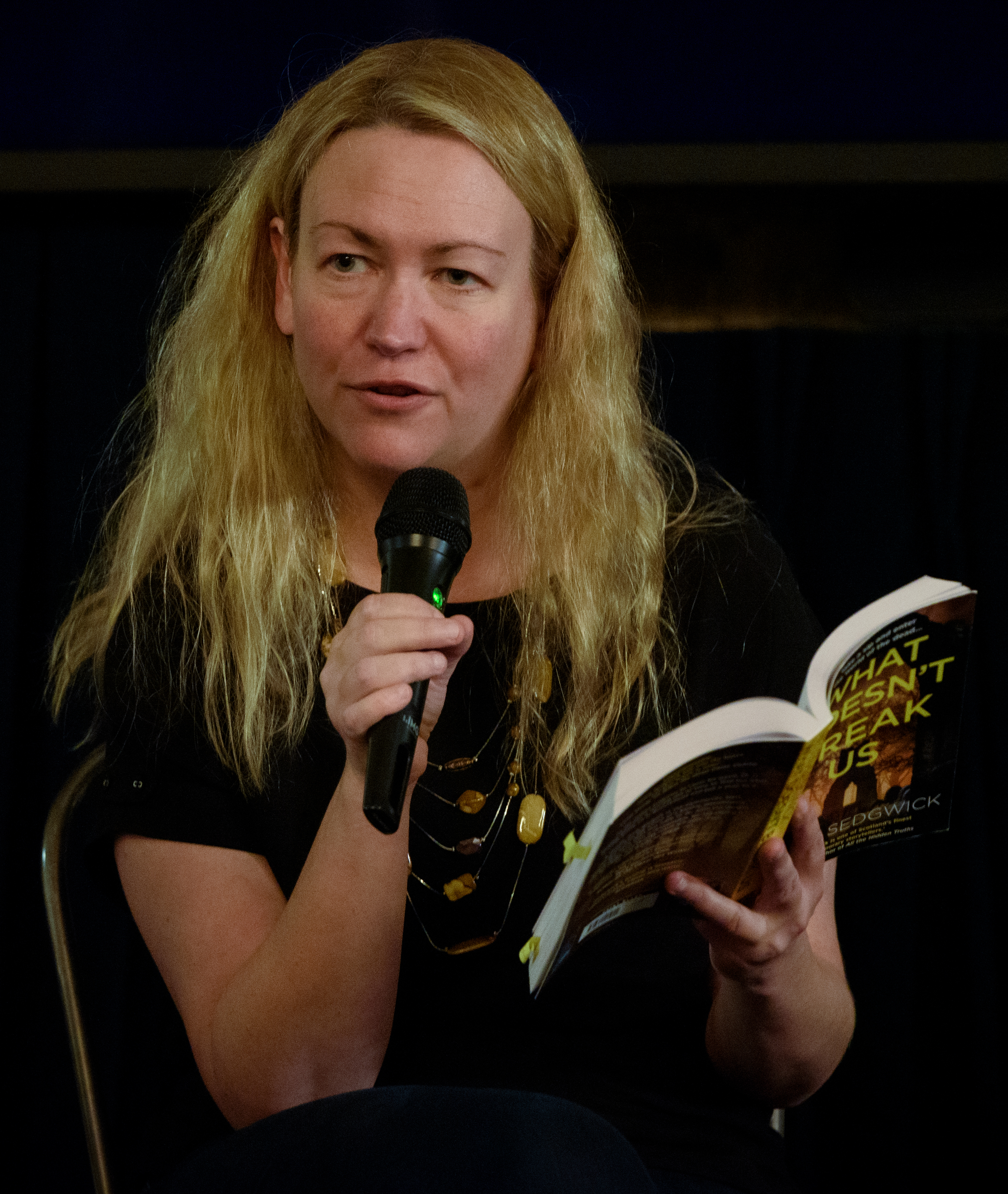
- Sedgwick in 2022
- Born: London
- Education: PhD in Physics; MLitt in Creative Writing
- Alma mater: University of Bristol, University of Edinburgh, University of Glasgow
- Occupation: Author
- Writing career
- Genres: Literary fiction, science fiction, speculative fiction, crime fiction, short stories
- Notable works: The Comet Seekers (2016); The Growing Season (2017); When The Dead Come Calling (2020)
- Website: helensedgwick.com

Helen Sedgwick is an author of literary fiction, science fiction and crime, a literary editor, and a research physicist.

== Life ==
Sedgwick was born in London and studied physics at the University of Bristol. She gained a PhD in physics from the University of Edinburgh and an MLitt in Creative Writing from the University of Glasgow.

After leaving physics research to become a freelance writer, Sedgwick worked as the joint managing director of Cargo Publishing from 2014 to 2015, Sedgwick was also the managing editor of Gutter magazine and worked as a creative writing tutor.

She released her first novel in 2016, The Comet Seekers. This was followed by her second novel, The Growing Season, which was shortlisted for Fiction Book of the Year in Scotland's National Book Awards 2018. Sedgwick's first crime novel was When The Dead Come Calling, the opening book in the Burrowhead Mysteries crime trilogy. She cites her scientific background as a big influence on her writing.

Sedgwick is a member of The Society of Authors and the Crime Writers' Association. She lives in Tain, in Ross-shire in the Scottish Highlands with her partner and their daughter.

== Awards ==
- 2012 Scottish Book Trust New Writers Award.
- 2016 Glamour Book of the Year: The Comet Seekers.
- 2016 Waterstones Scottish Book of the Month: The Comet Seekers.
- 2018 Scotland's National Book Awards Fiction Book of the Year shortlist: The Growing Season.
- 2021 Dr Gavin Wallace Fellowship.

== Bibliography ==
=== Novels ===
- The Comet Seekers (2016)
- The Growing Season (2017)
- When the Dead Come Calling (2020)
- Where the Missing Gather (2021)
- What Doesn't Break Us (2022)

=== Short stories ===
- The Archaeologist of Akrotiri, New Writing Scotland 35 (2017)
- The Largest Circle, 404 INK Issue 1 (2016)
- Quantum Gravity Or: The Pigmy Marmoset and the Prefabricated Concrete Bungalow, I Am Because You Are (2015)
- Duality, Out there (2014)
- Precognitive Abilities, Songs of Other Places, New Writing Scotland 32 (2014)
