= Peter Ross =

Peter Ross may refer to:

- Pete Ross, a fictional character appearing in DC Comics
- Peter Ross (cricketer) (born 1992), Scottish cricketer
- Peter Ross (author), Scottish writer

== See also ==
- Peter Ross-Edwards (1922–2012), Australian politician
