= Kris Haddow =

Kris Haddow (born Kris Clark on 24 June 1981) is a Scottish playwright, poet, performer and author, originally from Kirkconnel in Dumfries and Galloway.

== Background ==
Born in Dumfriesshire in 1981, Haddow was raised in Kelloholm in the former mining village of Kirkconnel and schooled in neighbouring Sanquhar. He moved to Paisley, Renfrewshire, in 2000 with the ambition of pursuing acting as a career. He spent ten years appearing in musicals and plays with various community theatre and profit share companies in Glasgow, while also working as a supporting artist with companies such as Scottish Ballet, the National Theatre of Scotland and BBC Scotland.

Haddow graduated the University of Glasgow with an MLitt in creative writing with merit in 2016, and is currently a PhD research candidate on their Doctor of Fine Arts creative writing programme. Before this, he had studied creative writing over several years at the Open University with a focus on writing for the stage. During this period, he started to produce a body of short stories and poems written in his native Lallans tongue, developing a passion for Scots language dialect representation. He began to teach workshops in Scots, which he expanded to include Ulster Scots dialect for the Ulster-Scots Agency in Northern Ireland. He returned to the Open University in 2019/20 to complete the BA (Hons) arts and humanities with creative writing he had originally started, graduating with first-class honours.

A classically trained baritone, Haddow's voice was coached by two private tutors over an eight-year period. Though he received no formal acting training, he attended night schools at both the Royal Conservatoire of Scotland and the Citizens' Theatre, where he went on to appear as both musician and supporting artist in several studio and main stage productions.

== Plays ==
His plays and monologues include The Bench (2009), Ronnie's Story (2010 version), 2h:9m:37s (2011) first produced for the Scottish Mental Health Arts and Film Festival before touring Scotland in 2012, Make Your Move (2011) and A Not So Dirty Protest (2012) both performed and broadcast live online as part of the National Theatre of Scotland's Five Minute Theatre events.

Haddow was mentored by the Playwrights' Studio, Scotland, in 2011/12, and announced as one of the Traverse Fifty in 2013, where 50 emerging writers were selected to work with the Traverse Theatre as part of its 50th anniversary celebrations. His play Best Seat in Town (2013) received readings in January and August as part of the Festival, with Haddow labelled 'one to watch out for'.

== Bibliography ==
=== Short stories ===
- Ronnie's Story (2011) in A Touch on the Shoulder
- The Incomer (2022) in New Writing Scotland 40
- The Auld Yin (2023) in Gutter 27
- Confession o a Mystery Shopper (2023) in Gutter 28

=== Poems ===
- On Times Austere (2012) in Windows for Burns Night (2013)

== Awards ==
In April 2011, Haddow was named winner of 'see me' Scotland's inaugural Creative Writing Award for his Scots language entry Ronnie's Story, judged by the author Lari Don and awarded by Scots Makar Liz Lochhead.

In January 2012 Windows for Burns Night was launched by The Stove in Dumfries, inviting contemporary poets from around the world to write poems to be displayed in windows around the town after the fashion of Robert Burns, who famously scratched lines of verse using a diamond point pen. Haddow's poem, On Times Austere, was announced as the winning submission, with an engraving of the poem in glass being permanently installed at The Globe Inn in Dumfries alongside replicas of Burns' original work.

In May 2021, it was announced in The Bookseller that Haddow had made the shortlist for the North Lit Agency Prize with a work in progress tentatively titled When the Curlew Cries No More. Set in the south of Scotland, it is being developed as his first full length novel under the supervision of the bestselling author C.J. Cooke on the University of Glasgow's Doctor of Fine Arts creative writing programme. The work in progress novel was picked as the winner of the Pitch Perfect event for emerging authors at the Bloody Scotland Crime Writing Festival in September 2021.

In December 2023, Haddow was announced as a recipient of a 2024 Scottish Book Trust Ignite Fellowship.
