= Allan Radcliffe =

Scottish novelist

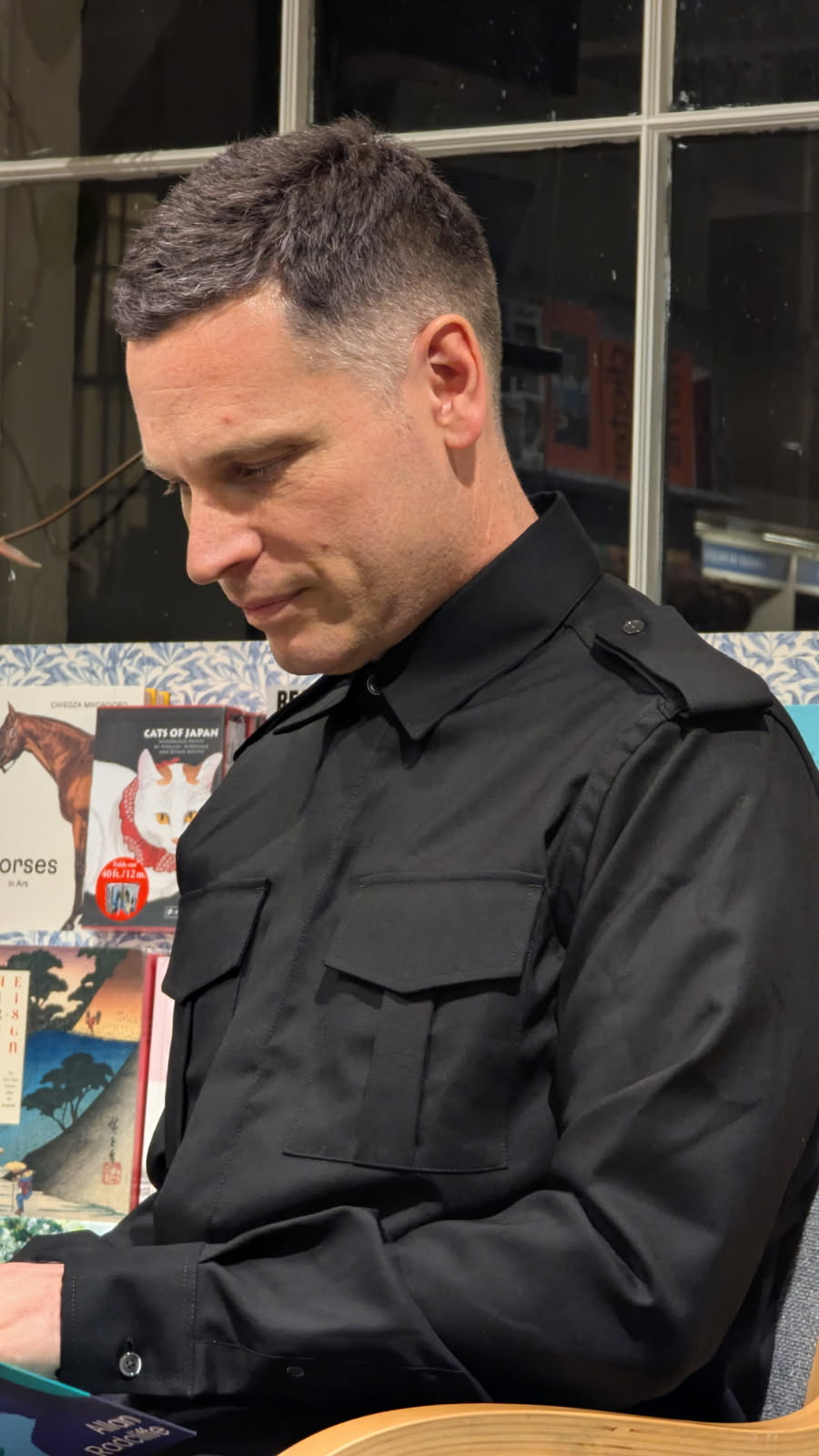
- Allan Radcliffe at the launch of Blurred Faces, Blackwell's, Edinburgh, 2025.

Allan Radcliffe (born 1976) is a Scottish novelist, journalist and editor. He is the author of The Old Haunts and Blurred Faces, both published by Fairlight Books. He is currently a theatre critic for The Times and an editor for New Writing Scotland, an annual anthology of poetry and prose.

== Biography ==
Radcliffe was born in Perth, Scotland and has an MA from the University of Glasgow. He has lived for several years in South Queensferry with his partner and son. His short stories have been broadcast on BBC Radio 4. His novels explore themes of grief, memory, queer politics and love and intimacy between men.

== Acclaim and awards ==
Radcliffe's debut novel The Old Haunts was shortlisted for the McKitterick Prize 2024 and for the First Book of the Year at Scotland's National Book Awards 2024. The novel was adapted as a BBC Radio 4 Book at Bedtime. The follow-up, Blurred Faces, was an Irish Independent Best Book of 2025. In 2009, he won a New Writers Award from the Scottish Book Trust.

== Novels ==
- The Old Haunts (2023, Fairlight Books, ISBN 978-1-914148-63-7)
- Blurred Faces (2025, Fairlight Books, ISBN 978-1-914148-81-1)
