= Sophie Cooke =

Scottish writer

Sophie Cooke (born 3 April 1976) is a Scottish novelist, short story writer, poet, and travel writer. Speaking in an interview with Aesthetica magazine in 2009, Cooke has said that her work is primarily concerned with questions of truth. She has developed the notion of truth as a depreciable asset. Cooke's work deals with the concealment of truth on various levels, from personal self-deceptions to governments misleading the public. She is the author of the novels The Glass House and Under The Mountain.

== Background ==
Cooke, was born in 1976 and spent her childhood in Kilmahog: this house later formed the setting for her second novel. She attended McLaren High School in Callander (Perthshire) and then the University of Edinburgh, where she gained a master's degree in Social Anthropology. Cooke is a great, great granddaughter of biologist Thomas Henry Huxley.

In 2000, Cooke's short story Why You Should Not Put Your Hand Through The Ice won runner-up prize in the MacAllan/Scotland on Sunday Short Story Competition. Cooke also contributed the short story At The Time to the anthology Damage Lands (2001), edited by Alan Bissett. Cooke's first novel The Glass House (2004) was published by Random House and shortlisted for the Saltire First Book of The Year Award. In 2006 her short story Skin And Bones was broadcast on BBC Radio 4, performed by the actress Laura Fraser. Cooke's poetry of the same year addressed environmental issues. Her second novel Under the Mountain, published in 2008, showed a greater political emphasis than her previous work. This novel combined her interest in personal fabrications with wider social memes such as terrorism, and specifically with the construction of potentially false narratives around terrifying events (see Aesthetica interview). The political emphasis in Cooke's work continued in 2009 with the performance of her first dramatic monologue, Protective Measures, at the Kikinda Short Story Festival in Serbia.

Critics have drawn parallels between Cooke's work and that of Virginia Woolf (Scottish Review of Books, 2008) and of contemporary screenwriters such as Thomas Vinterberg (Manchester Evening News, 2004). In 2009 she was living in Berlin. Cooke also writes travel articles for The Guardian.

== Bibliography ==
=== Novels ===
- The Glass House (2004)
- Under The Mountain (2008)

=== Short stories ===
- Why You Should Not Put Your Hand Through The Ice (2000) runner-up prize in the MacAllan / Scotland on Sunday Short Story Competition; published in MacAllan Shorts by Polygon; broadcast on BBC Radio Scotland.
- The Incomprehensible Mortality of Karen Mack (2001) longlisted for the MacAllan / Scotland on Sunday Short Story Competition; published in MacAllan Shorts by Polygon.
- At The Time (2001) in Damage Land: New Scottish Gothic Fiction editor: Alan Bissett.
- Skin And Bones (2006) broadcast by BBC Radio 4.
- The Long Watch (2009) published in the Kikinda Shorts anthology (Belgrade).
- Havana (2009) published in Notes From The Underground magazine.
- After Falling (2009) published in GRASP literary magazine (Prague).
- United Solutions (2010) published in "The Year of Open Doors" anthology by Cargo editor: Rodge Glass

=== Dramatic monologues ===
- Protective Measures (2009) performed at the Kikinda Short Story Festival in Serbia; published in the Kikinda Shorts anthology (Belgrade).

=== Poetry ===
- Antarctica (2006) published in Product magazine.
- 2058 (2010) published in Gutter magazine.
