= Chris McQueer =

Scottish writer and spoken art performer

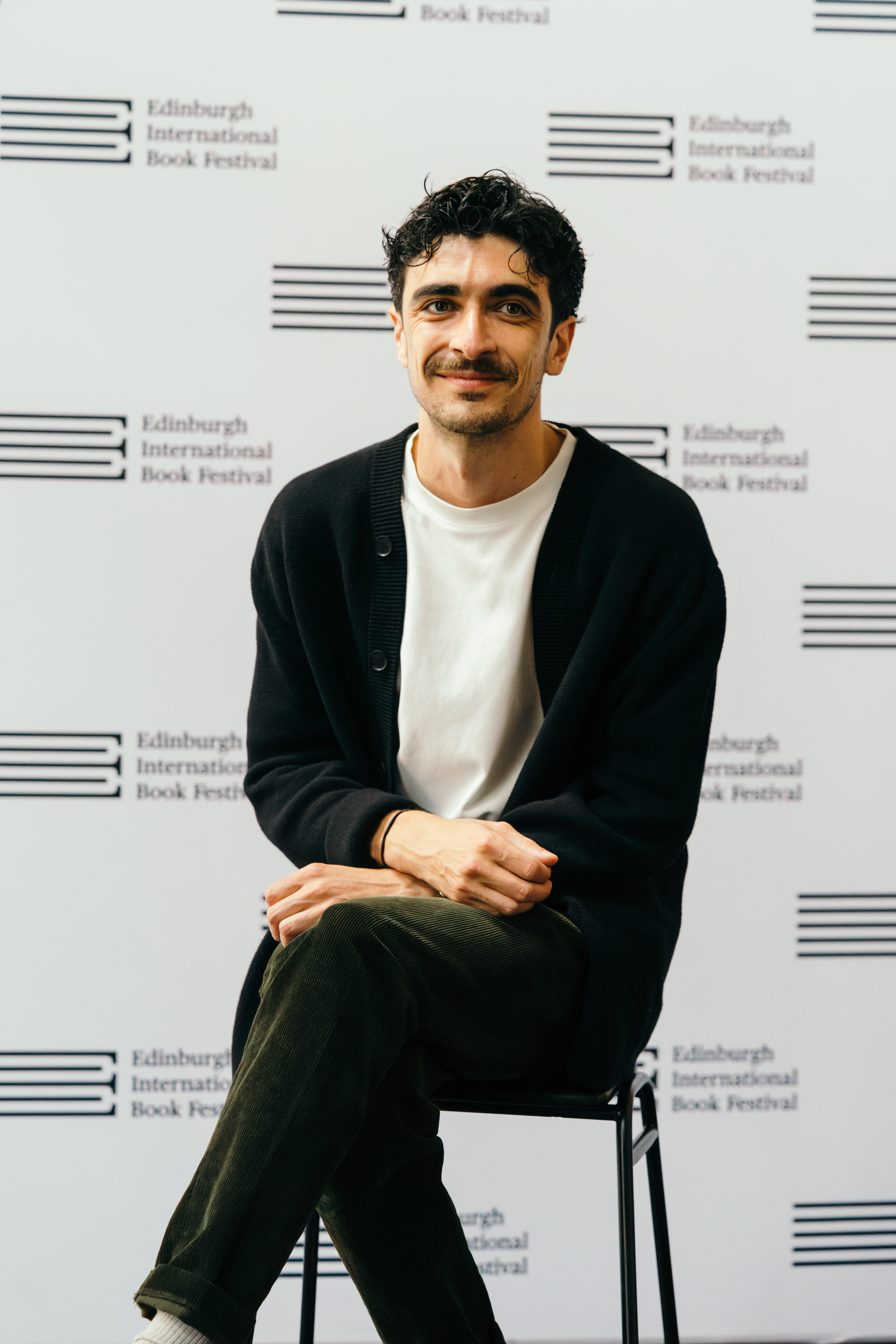
- McQueer at the 2025 Edinburgh International Book Festival
- Born: Chris McQueer; Glasgow, Scotland
- Education: City of Glasgow College
- Occupations: Writer, spoken word performer
- Writing career
- Language: Scots, English
- Period: 2017–present
- Genres: Dark comedy, Surreal humour, short stories

Chris McQueer is a Scottish writer and spoken art performer. With extensive use of the Scots language, his writings feature dark comedy and surreal humour. He is best known for his two collections of short stories, Hings and HWFG, and for his novel, Hermit, which was shortlisted for the Scotland's National Book Awards Fiction Book of the Year.

== Background ==
McQueer was brought up in the East End of Glasgow. He worked in a sports shop and as a crime scene cleaner before becoming a full-time writer. He supports Celtic F.C.

== Writing career ==
McQueer began his writing career by self-publishing short stories on Twitter. His first book collection, Hings, was published in 2017 and was compiled from his Twitter stories. It won Best Short Story Collection at the 2018 Saboteur Awards.

The success of Hings allowed McQueer to give up his job to write full time. In 2018 he published another collection of short stories, HWFG (which stands for Here We Fucking Go), his first collection to be written specifically for book publication. After being dissatisfied with his initial efforts, which he felt too closely resembled the style of Hings, he consciously adopted a darker tone for this collection.

In 2019, some of the stories from Hings were adapted as a three-part series of short films for BBC iPlayer, Chris McQueer's Hings. McQueer himself appears as the series' narrator.

McQueer also gives regular spoken word performances of his stories.

His novel Hermit was published in 2025 and was shortlisted for Scotland's National Book Awards Fiction Book of the Year.

== Writing style ==
McQueer's work, which is written in naturalistic Glaswegian Scots and English, has a darkly humorous style that has been compared to that of Limmy and Irvine Welsh. Scottish actor Martin Compston described McQueer as "like Charlie Brooker on Buckfast".
