= The Trick Is to Keep Breathing (novel) =

1989 book by Janice Galloway

First edition

The Trick is to Keep Breathing is the first novel from the writer Janice Galloway. It was first published in the United Kingdom by Polygon in 1989. The novel won the MIND/Allen Lane Book of the Year and was also shortlisted for both the Whitbread First Novel and Scottish First Book awards.

== Characters ==
=== Joy Stone ===
The novel's protagonist and narrator. She is 27 years old. She lives on a council estate on the outskirts of Irvine, North Ayrshire, not far from the dilapidated cottage she owns. She is a drama teacher, and works part-time at a bookmakers. She is anorexic, and possibly as a consequence no longer menstruates. She voraciously reads women's magazines. She is an alcoholic. Throughout the novel she tries to find the "trick" to keep living on.

=== Marianne ===
Joy's friend who is also a teacher. For the duration of the novel she is teaching in Kentucky, USA. She regularly writes to Joy.

=== Ellen ===
The mother of Marianne. She lives alone in a house too large for one person. She loves to cook, and equates food with happiness.

=== Michael Fisher ===
He was the husband of Norma Fisher, and Joy's lover. He drowned in a swimming pool in Spain when on holiday with Joy before the novel's own timeline. His death is retold throughout the novel in italicized text.

=== Paul ===
Joy's ex-boyfriend. Lovers from childhood, they were together for seven years.

=== David ===
An ex-student of Joy's school where she teaches. Partner in Joy's affair while with Paul. Currently in college David returns after Michael's death and from then on spontaneously calls and visits Joy usually resulting in sex.

=== Tony ===
Joy's boss at her part-time job. He calls her on a semi-regular basis to take her out to various events, usually resulting in Tony forcing himself on Joy.

=== Myra ===
Joy's sister. She is twenty-three years older than Joy and they do not have anything in common - Joy is frightened of her since she used to abuse her as a child, perhaps due to having a miscarriage around the same time as Joy was born.
