= Buddha Da =

2003 novel by Anne Donovan

- First edition
- Author: Anne Donovan
- Language: Scots, Glaswegian dialect
- Publisher: Canongate
- Publication date: 2 January 2003
- Publication place: Scotland
- Media type: Paperback
- Pages: 330
- ISBN: 1-84195-451-9
- OCLC: 53242388

Buddha Da (2003) is a novel by Scottish author Anne Donovan. It was shortlisted for the 2003 Orange Prize, and the 2003 Whitbread Book Award for a first novel.

== Plot summary ==
The book takes a mostly light-hearted look at what might happen when two vastly opposing worlds and ways of life come into contact with each other.

Following a chance meeting with a Buddhist monk in a Glasgow sandwich bar one lunchtime, painter and decorator Jimmy McKenna starts to develop an interest in Buddhism and begins to visit a meditation centre and go away for weekend retreats. The story is essentially about Jimmy's new-found faith, and the reaction of his immediate family to this.

It is told from three points of view - those of Jimmy, his wife Liz, and their daughter Anne Marie - and follows the family as Jimmy's desire to lead a better and more meaningful life begins to have an effect on them all. To begin with, this proves to be to their detriment, as Liz and Anne Marie cannot understand why Jimmy - who has previously been an atheist - would suddenly want to become a Buddhist. However, as the story unfolds, a series of events allow everyone to gain some insight into the choices Jimmy has made.
