= Helen McClory =

Scottish writer

- Occupation: Author
- Writing career
- Notable works: On the Edges of Vision, Flesh of the Peach, The Goldblum Variations
- Notable awards: Saltire First Book of the Year (2015)

Helen McClory is a Scottish writer. She is known for her debut short story collection, On the Edges of Vision, which won the Saltire First Book of the Year award in 2015. Her first novel, Flesh of the Peach, was published in 2017. A collection of flash fiction about Jeff Goldblum was published by Penguin Books in 2019.

== Bibliography ==
- On the Edges of Vision (2015)
- Flesh of the Peach (2017)
- Mayhem & Death (2018)
- The Goldblum Variations (2019)
- Bitterhall (2021)

== Awards and recognition ==
- Saltire First Book of the Year (2015) for On the Edges of Vision
