= The Scottish Town in the Age of Enlightenment, 1740–1820 =

2014 book by Bob Harris and Charles McKean

- First edition
- Author: Bob Harris; Charles McKean
- Language: English
- Genre: Non-fiction
- Publisher: Edinburgh University Press
- Publication date: August 2014

The Scottish Town in the Age of Enlightenment, 1740–1820 is a book by Scottish historians Bob Harris and Charles McKean. It was first published in August 2014, almost a year after McKean's death, by Edinburgh University Press. The book won the Saltire Book of the Year award for 2014. The book examines how Scottish burghs improved themselves during the Enlightenment period.

== Reception ==
The judging panel of the Saltire Book of the Year Award described the work as 'book that people will value for many years to come' and noted that 'It is also extremely well researched and readable'. The judging panel also praised it as being '‘magisterial' and considered it to be a 'pioneering study'. In addition to winning the overall Saltire Award, the book was named as the 2014 Saltire Society Scottish Research Book of the Year.

Scottish historian Professor Ian Donnachie praised the book as 'a major contribution to urban, social and cultural history' and felt it was an appropriate tribute to the research and work of Charles McKean who died when the book was being written.
