= Anne Bevan =

Scottish visual artist

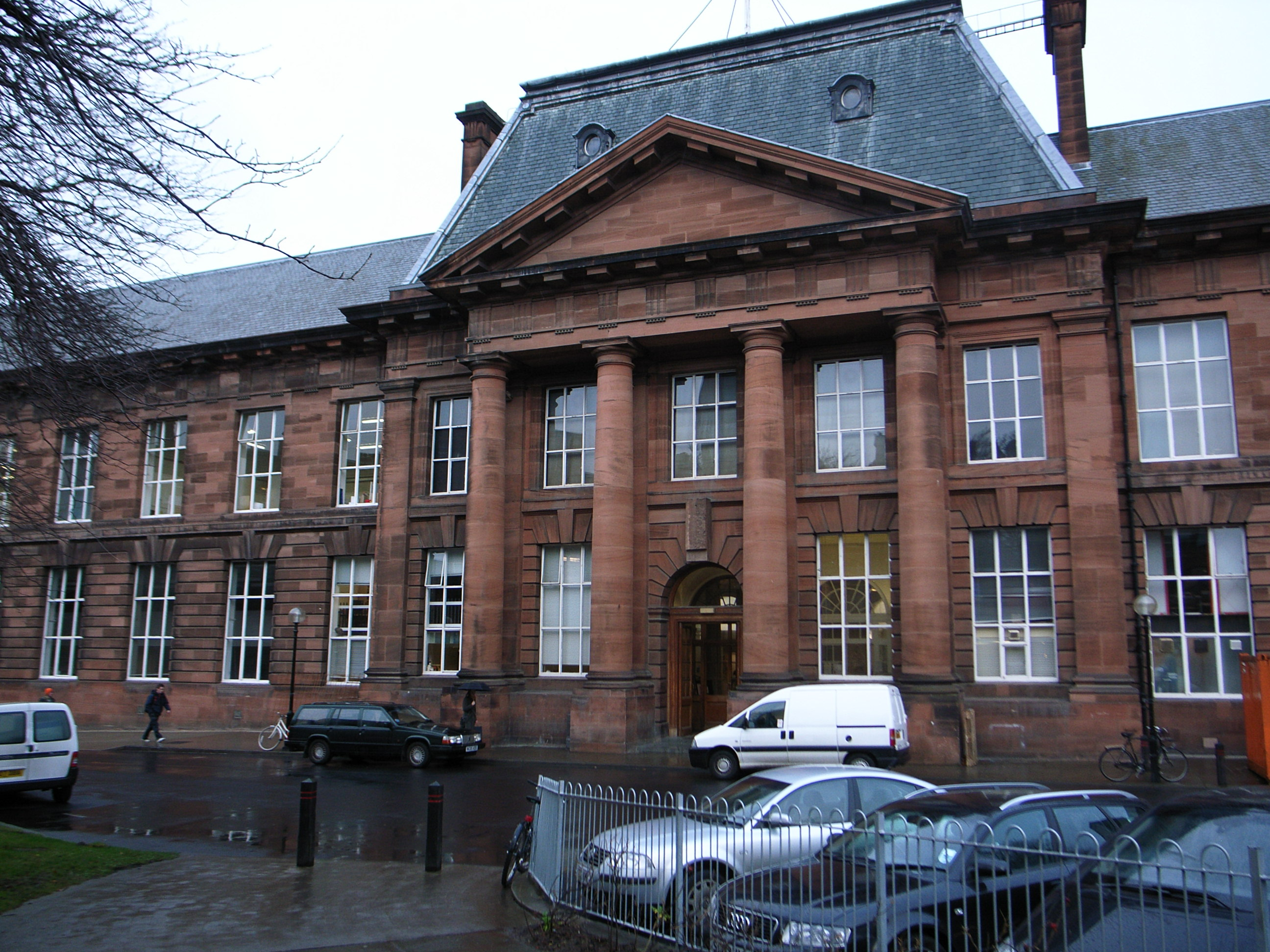
Edinburgh College of Art, of which Bevan is an alumna.

Anne Bevan (born 1965) is a Scottish visual artist, sculptor, and lecturer at Edinburgh College of Art.

== Early life ==
She graduated with an MA Hons in Fine Art (Sculpture) from the University of Edinburgh and Edinburgh College of Art between 1983 and 1988.

== Career ==
Her exhibitions include Rosengarten, a collaboration with writer Janice Galloway at the Hunterian Museum in Glasgow in 2004. This exhibition was inspired by research into obstetric instruments and the mechanics of childbirth. It featured nine light tables with sculptural pieces in bronze, plaster and fabric, and poems and text by Janice Galloway.

A review featured in The List at the time of the exhibition in 2004 said: “Bevan engages with the obstetric forms but you also feel an infinity lies within the materials she uses, a sense of investment, which is echoed in Galloway’s text. The two elements are essential to one another. The text subtly lifts you out of the materiality of the sculptures, enhancing your emotional engagement with the work, whilst the scale and form of the objects creates a bodily reaction that borders on the physically uncomfortable.“ Bevan often looks at themes such as the environment, in particular water and the sea.

In 2012, she was one of 100 artists who co-signed an open letter to Creative Scotland, critical of the organisation, and making a number of requests, including the removal of jargon from official communications and the inclusion of those with artform experience to funding applications.

Recent projects have focused on marine biology, wave and tidal energy and coastal change, working with scientists at the University of Edinburgh, the International Centre for Island Technology at Heriott-Watt University and archaeologists at Orkney College.

== Exhibitions ==
In 2012, she exhibited 'Particle - Things Unseen' at the Bonhoga Gallery in Shetland.

Other solo exhibitions include:

- 2001 Level, Peacock Visual Arts, Aberdeen; exhibition & CD-ROM; commissioned by New Media Scotland and Peacock Visual Arts
- 2000 Undercovered, The Fruitmarket Gallery, Edinburgh; exhibition & book - 'pipelines' with writer Janice Galloway
- 1997 Lifting Light, The Pier Arts Centre, Stromness, Orkney; exhibition & publication with essay by Murdo McDonald
- 1992 Soundings, The Collective Gallery, Edinburgh
- 1991 New Work, The Black Pig Gallery, Kirkwall, Orkney
