= Anne Donovan (author) =

Scottish author

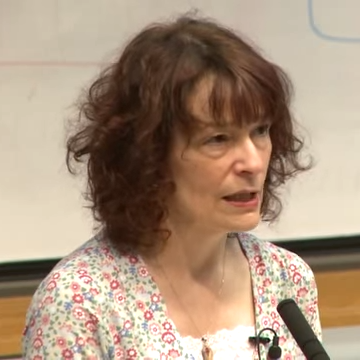
- Donovan in 2015
- Born: c. 1956 (age 69–70); Coatbridge, Lanarkshire, Scotland
- Occupation: Writer
- Notable work: Buddha Da (2003); Being Emily (2012)
- Website: annedonovan.co.uk

Anne Donovan (born c. 1956, Coatbridge) is a Scottish author. She is best known for her novel Buddha Da (2003), which won her the Scottish Arts Council Award and Le Prince Maurice Award and saw her shortlisted for the Orange Prize for Fiction, Whitbread Book Award for First Novel and Scottish Book of the Year. Donovan writes in the Scots, specifically the Glaswegian dialect, and has been praised for writing about the lives of "ordinary people." Several of her short stories have been part of the National 5 set texts since 2012.

== Biography ==
Donovan was born and raised in Coatbridge, Lanarkshire, Scotland. She was brought up Catholic and had a "very happy childhood." The first in her family to attend university, she earned a degree in English literature and philosophy from University of Glasgow, followed by a master's degree in creative writing. She became an English teacher and wrote as hobby until attending an Arvon Foundation writing retreat in Inverness in the mid-1990s. By 2003, she had experienced enough success in her writing that she was teaching English part-time at Hillhead High School. She retired from teaching in 2004 to focus on writing full-time.

Her first story to be published in a magazine was Hieroglyphics, which was written in 1995 and later included in the 1998 anthology The Flamingo Book of New Scottish Writing. She initially wrote the story in Scots. By 1999, she had around ten stories published in journals such as Chapman and New Writing Scotland. She won the Macallan/Scotland on Sunday Short Story Competition in 1997 for All that Glister, followed by a Canongate Prize from Canongate Books for Millennium Babe. She was then signed by Canongate for a volume of 18 short stories and a novel, which came in the form of Hieroglyphics and Other Stories in 2001 and Buddha Da in 2003. Buddha Da experienced critical success, earning her a Scottish Arts Council Award and a Le Prince Maurice Award, and being shortlisted for several others, including the Orange Prize for Fiction. The novel is told from three perspectives and follows a Glaswegian father whose sudden fixation on Buddhism and his quest for enlightenment causes him to neglect his family. By 2014, it had been translated into German and Russian. Her second novel, Being Emily, a coming-of-age story centered on a young girl who emulates Emily Brontë, followed in 2012. By 2014, it had been translated into German and Brazilian Portuguese.

Donovan's short story All That Glisters was adapted into a short film by Claire Lamond, which was then nominated in the Scotland/Animation category at the 2012 British Academy Scotland Awards. Her third novel, Gone Are The Leaves, was published in 2014. Set in medieval Scotland, the book follows Deirdre, a younger embroiderer in a wealthy household, and her friend Feilamort, a talented singer and a favorite of the lord's wife. It was short-listed for the Saltire Society's Literary Book of the Year award in 2014. In 2018, she co-authored a paper called Scots Language in Education, which was published in the book Scottish Education: Fifth Edition. In 2019, Donovan translated Roald Dahl's book Matilda into Scots. In 2024, the theatre company A Play, A Pie and A Pint performed an adaptation of Hieroglyphics at Òran Mór. Donovan herself wrote the script and this was her first story to be adapted to stage. Later that year, she gave a public lecture for the 4th World Congress of Scottish Literatures.

In 2012, several stories from Hieroglyphics and Other Stories were selected for prose set texts for Scottish Literature classes, specifically for National 5. These continue to be part of the curriculum as of February 2025. Donovan has worked on primary education initiatives as part of Glasgow Caledonian University for more than a decade. One program she has been involved with is Families Learning Together, where children in Primary 3-4 are encouraged to learn with family members. Another is the Caledonian Club, where in 2014 she helped organised the Primary 2 digital Molly and Cally adventure series. This programme encourages child-led learning by allowing students to research, write and illustrate their own book. She has also done workshops and readings at secondary schools for the Scots on Education programme and has worked on textbook development.

Donovan received an honorary degree of Doctor of Letters by Glasgow Caledonian University in 2011.

== Personal life ==
Donovan and her husband have one son and live in Glasgow.

== Publications ==
- Hieroglyphics and Other Stories. Canongate Books. 2001.
- Buddha Da. Canongate Books. 2003.
- Being Emily. Canongate Books. 2008.
- Gone Are the Leaves. Canongate Books. 2014.

Anthologies

- "Loast". New Writing Scotland: Issues 14-16. Association for Scottish Literary Studies. 1996. pp. 20–22.
- "Hieroglyphics". The Flamingo Book of New Scottish Writing. Flamingo. 1998. pp. 121–131. ISBN 9780006550501.
- Patrick, Adele, ed. (2014). "Lassie wi a Yella Coatie". 21 Revolutions: New Writing and Prints Inspired by the Collection at Glasgow Women's Library. Freight Books. ISBN 9780952227335.
- Donovan, Anne; Niven, Liz (2018). "66. The Scots Language in Education". Scottish Education: Fifth Edition. Edinburgh University Press. pp. 565–575. JSTOR 10.3366/j.ctv1kz4g7s.69.

== Awards ==
Year	Work	Award	Awarding Body	Outcome	Ref
1997	All that Glister	Macallan/Scotland on Sunday Short Story Competition	Macallan and Scotland on Sunday	Won	
1999	Millennium Babe	Canongate Prize	Canongate Books	Won	
2003	Buddha Da	Orange Prize for Fiction	Orange Prize for Fiction	Shortlisted	
2003	Buddha Da	Whitbread Book Award for First Novel	Whitbread	Shortlisted	
2003	Buddha Da	Scottish Book of the Year	Saltire Society	Shortlisted	
2004	Buddha Da	Scottish Arts Council Award	Scottish Arts Council	Won	
2004	Buddha Da	Le Prince Maurice Award	Constance Prince Maurice Resort	Won	
2005	Buddha Da	International IMPAC Dublin Literary Award	Dublin City Public Libraries and Archive	Longlisted	
2014	Gone Are the Leaves	Literary Book of the Year	Saltire Society	Shortlisted	
2022		Janet Paisley Services to Scots Award	Scots Radio	Won	
