= Kirsty Logan =

Scottish writer and poet

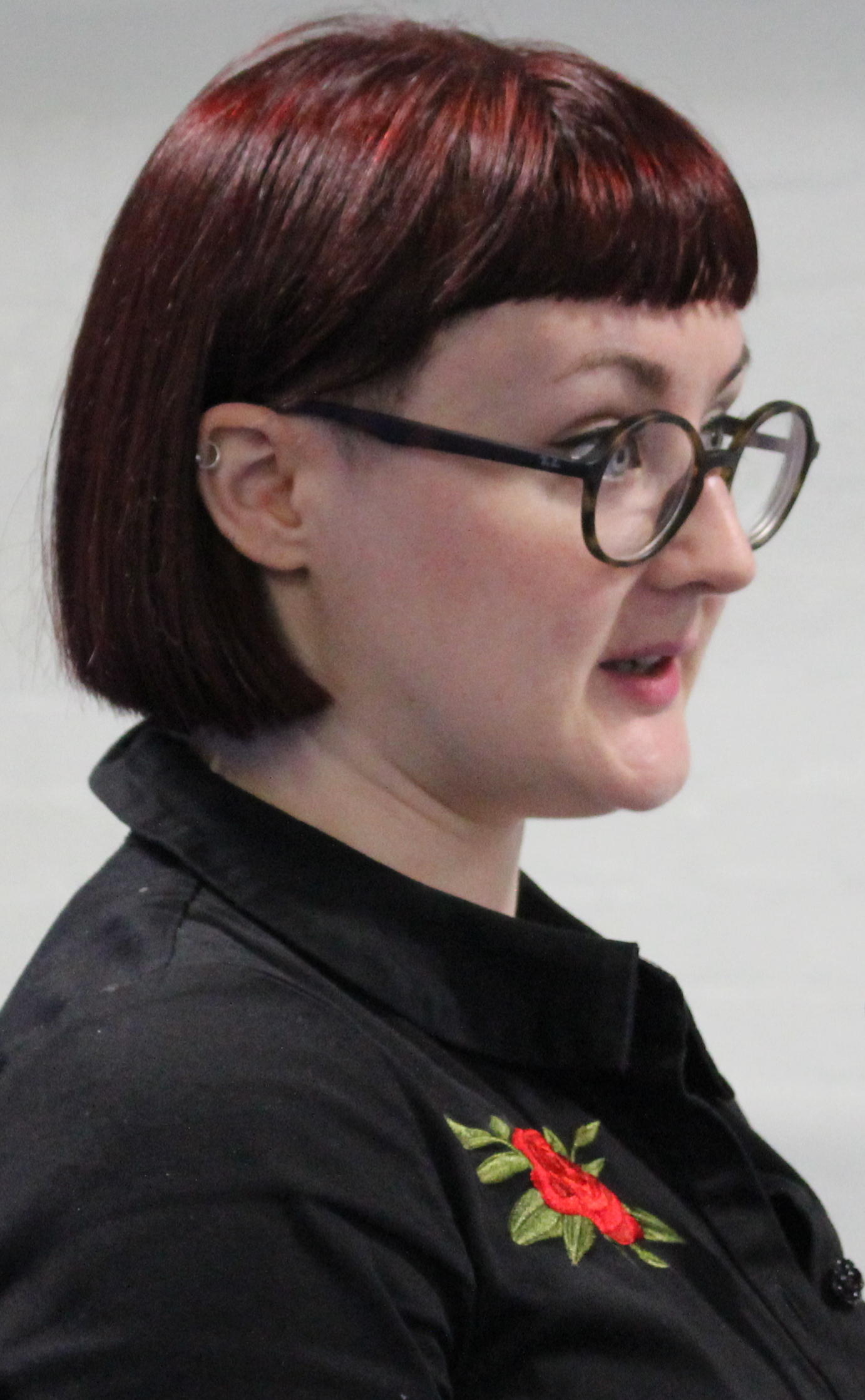
- Logan in 2019
- Born: 13 March 1984 (age 42)
- Occupation: Writer
- Website: https://www.kirstylogan.com/

Kirsty Logan (born 13 March 1984) is a Scottish writer.

Logan lives in Glasgow. She wrote her undergraduate thesis on retold fairytales, and her work has been broadcast on BBC Radio 4. She cites Emma Donoghue and Angela Carter as her main influences.

== Work ==
In 2012 Logan was one of 21 women writers and artists who contributed to the Glasgow Women's Library 21 Revolutions publication, released to mark the organisation's twenty-first year. She contributed a collage on paper entitled This Is Liberty.

Her first collection of short stories, The Rental Heart and Other Fairytales, was published by Salt Publishing in 2014. The collection was shortlisted for the 2014 Green Carnation Prize for LGBT Writers, and also won the 2015 Polari First Book Prize (awarded each year to a writer whose debut work explores the LGBT experience), the 2013 Scott Prize for Short Stories, The Herald: Book of the Year 2014 and the 2014 Saboteur Award for Best Short Story Collection. It was also nominated for the 2014 Saltire Society Literary Award for First Book of the Year and longlisted for the Frank O'Connor International Short Story Award.

In 2013 the Association for Scottish Literary Studies (ASLS) selected Logan to be the recipient of Creative Scotland's first Dr Gavin Wallace Fellowship, to enable her to produce a collection of short fiction inspired by Scottish folklore. In 2015 the resulting book, A Portable Shelter, was published in limited edition hardback by ASLS. A paperback edition was published by Vintage Books in November 2016. A Portable Shelter was longlisted for the 2016 Edge Hill Short Story Prize, and in 2017 the collection was shortlisted for the Green Carnation Prize.

In 2015 Logan was interviewed as part of Glasgow's Aye Write! festival, where she read an extract from her debut novel, The Gracekeepers, and appeared as the Scottish Book Trust New Writers Award winner at Morningside Library in Edinburgh as part of Book Week Scotland. The Gracekeepers won the Lambda Literary Award for Best LGBT SF/F/Horror in 2016. Her second novel, The Gloaming, was published in 2018, and her third novel, Now She is Witch, followed in 2023.

== Bibliography ==
=== Short story collections ===
- The Rental Heart and Other Fairytales (2014)
- A Portable Shelter (2015)
- Things We Say in the Dark (2019)
- No & Other Love Stories (2025)

=== Novels ===
- The Gracekeepers (2015)
- Gloaming (2018)
- Now She Is Witch (2023)

== Awards and honours ==
=== Literary awards ===
- 2013 Scott Prize for Short Stories: The Rental Heart and Other Fairytales
- 2014 Frank O'Connor International Short Story Prize (longlist): The Rental Heart and Other Fairytales
- 2014 Green Carnation Prize (shortlist): The Rental Heart and Other Fairytales
- 2014 The Herald: Book of the Year: The Rental Heart and Other Fairytales
- 2014 Saboteur Award for Best Short Story Collection: The Rental Heart and Other Fairytales
- 2014 Saltire Society Literary Award for First Book of the Year (nominated):
- 2015 Polari First Book Prize: The Rental Heart and Other Fairytales
- 2016 Lambda Literary Award for Best LGBT SF/F/Horror: The Gracekeepers

=== Honours ===
- 2013/14 Dr. Gavin Wallace Fellow
