= Fiona Rintoul =

Scottish author and translator

- Occupations: Author; translator; journalist
- Years active: c1990–present

Fiona Rintoul is a prize-winning writer, poet and translator who lives on the Isle of Harris in the Outer Hebrides, Scotland.

== Education ==
Rintoul grew up in East Kilbride, Glasgow, and studied French and German at St Andrews University in Fife. For an exchange programme in the third year, she chose to study behind the Iron Curtain at Karl Marx University, partly because she was a "bolshie" student. Rintoul arrived in Leipzig, East Germany, in March 1986. This was three years before the fall of the Berlin Wall. The Stasi opened a file on her. She described the country as "very drab, very grey, very rundown. You stop noticing after a while, and there was something quite appealing about the rundownness of it all. It wasn't ruled by money." It "felt scary" at first, she told the BBC, and there was a lot of political propaganda "you just got used to it and started to have a good time".

She studied creative writing at Glasgow University in 2009 while working as a freelance journalist.

== Career ==
Rintoul became a financial journalist and the editor of London-based Funds Europe, a specialised pensions and investment management magazine. She contributed news stories about banking, asset allocation and funds management to the Financial Times between 2006 and 2015. She also worked as a freelance translator. More recently, she has written for We Love Stornoway.

In 2014, her translation of Erziehung vor Verdun, the third of Arnold Zweig's Great War books, was published as Outside Verdun. The Independent described it as a "soberly portrayed view of that war [which] resonates long after the reading".

Her first novel, The Leipzig Affair, came out a year later. It drew on her experiences as a student and later visits to the reunified Germany to tell the tale of a "doomed love affair" between a young Scottish man and an East German woman in Leipzig in the dying days of the Cold War. The Scotsman's reviewer David Robinson said: "this brilliant Scottish debut novel ... deserves all the praise that will doubtless come its way." The Glasgow Times said it was "Deftly told in short, punchy chapters, the thriller is a page-turner." Margaret Drabble described it as "a page-turner that reminds one of the horrors of the Cold War".

The Leipzig Affair was serialised on BBC Radio 4's Book at Bedtime. Douglas Henshall was one of the readers. The book was shortlisted for a Saltire Society award and won the Virginia prize for new women fiction writers from around the world.

Rintoul has since written two books exploring the Scotch industry. The first, Whisky Island (2016), was about Islay's single malt distilleries and the second was Whisky Cask Investment (2023).

Since 2021, Rintoul has contributed comment and opinion articles to The Times and to the Press & Journal, a newspaper that covers the Scottish Highlands. She has also acted as a book reviewer for The Herald. Rintoul's work is also featured in The Women Writers Handbook, published in 2020.

Since the COVID lockdown she has been working on A Place Like This, a book about remote communities in the Outer Hebrides.

== Awards ==
- International Journalists’ bursary from the International Journalists’ Programmes for a British-German journalist exchange.
- 2007 Mslexia Women's Poetry Competition (finalist).
- 2007 Daily Telegraph novel-in-a-year competition (runner-up for Leipzig).
- 2008 Gillian Purvis New Writing Award (for an early version of The Leipzig Affair).
- 2009 Sceptre (Hodder and Stoughton) Prize for emerging writers with a draft of Leipzig, which the judges described as "confident" and "compelling".
- 2013 Virginia prize for new women fiction writers.
- 2015 Saltire Society award (shortlisted).
- 2017 Fortnum & Mason Debut Drink Book Award (shortlisted for Whisky Island).
- 2017 Bath Short Story Award (runner-up for North Ridge).
- 2017 Fish Poetry Prize (longlisted for Feur Gorm).
