= Douglas Galbraith =

Scottish historical novelist

Robert Douglas Galbraith (28 October 1965 – 23 March 2018) was a Scottish historical novelist.

== Early life ==
Galbraith was born in 1965 to Alan and Judy Galbraith. He was educated at The Glasgow Academy and the University of St Andrews, where he read mediaeval history. He then undertook a PhD at Pembroke College, Cambridge, where he met Tomoko Hanasaki.

== Career ==
After working in the wine trade, he was able to focus on writing after the success of his first novel, The Rising Sun, in 2000. The novel explored the Scottish trade expedition to Darien in 1698, which ended in financial ruin. It was awarded the Saltire Award for Best First Novel. His follow-up novel, Crichton, (about the Scottish polymath James Crichton) was offered publication, but his agent rejected the offer, thinking that further offers would be forthcoming. None were, and it was subsequently only published as an e-book.

== Works ==
- The Rising Sun (2000: Picador).
- Crichton (2010: e-book).
- A Winter in China (2005: Secker).
- King Henry (2008: Vintage).
- My Son, My Son (2012: Vintage).

== Personal life ==
Galbraith married Tomoko Hanasaki in 1996; they had two sons, Satomi and Makoto. In 2003, when the boys were six and four, Galbraith returned from a meeting with his publishers to discover that Hanasaki had abducted them and taken them to Japan. His memoir My Son, My Son is about their abduction. Despite his best efforts, Galbraith never saw his sons again, and they remain (2022) missing.

Galbraith was the uncle of the author and journalist, Patrick Galbraith, whose first book In Search of One Last Song (2022: William Collins) was dedicated to Douglas Galbraith.

Galbraith died in 2018, aged 52.
