= Niall Campbell (poet) =

Scottish poet

- Born: 1984 (age 41–42); South Uist, Scotland
- Education: University of Glasgow
- Occupation: Poet
- Spouse: Catriona McAra
- Writing career
- Notable work: Moontide (2014)
- Notable awards: Eric Gregory Award (2011); Edwin Morgan Poetry Prize (2014); Saltire First Book of the Year award (2014)
- Website: niallcampbellpoet.wordpress.com

Niall Campbell (born 1984), is a Scottish poet. He has published three poetry collections and a poetry pamphlet. He was a recipient of the Eric Gregory Award for poets under 30 in 2011. In 2014 he won the Edwin Morgan Poetry Award for poets under 30 and the Saltire First Book of the Year award and was shortlisted for the Forward Prize for Best First Collection. He has also been shortlisted for the Forward Prize for Best Collection and Scotland's National Book Awards Scottish Poetry Book of the Year.

== Biography ==
Campbell was born in 1984 in South Uist in the Outer Hebrides of Scotland. He studied English literature at the University of Glasgow, where he began writing poetry. In 2009 he completed the MLitt in creative writing at the University of St. Andrews. He lived in Leeds for some time and currently lives in Fife.

== Writing career ==
In 2011, Campbell was the recipient of an Eric Gregory Award for poets under 30 and a Robert Louis Stevenson Fellowship. In 2012, his poetry pamphlet After the Creel Fleet was published by HappenStance Press. In 2013, he won the Poetry London Competition with his poem "The Letter Always Arrives at its Destination". He was the recipient of a Jerwood/Arvon mentorship in 2013.

Campbell's first full-length poetry collection, Moontide, was published by Bloodaxe Books in 2014. The collection won the 2014 Edwin Morgan Poetry award for poets under the age of 30 and the Saltire First Book of the Year award. The collection was also shortlisted for the Fenton Aldeburgh First Collection Prize and the Forward Prize for Best First Collection.

A selection of Campbell's poetry, First Nights, was published in the United States in 2017, as part of the Princeton Series of Contemporary Poets. The collection includes the poems in Moontide, along with sixteen new poems.

The new poems would go on to be included in his second full collection, Noctuary, published in 2019 by Bloodaxe Books. This collection was shortlisted for the Forward Prize for Best Collection in 2019.

Campbell's third full collection, The Island in the Sound, was published by Bloodaxe in 2024. It was shortlisted for Scotland's National Book Awards Scottish Poetry Book of the Year in 2025.

Campbell has also worked as a librettist for the BBC Philharmonic Orchestra and the Scottish Chamber Orchestra. He is the poetry editor of the journal, Poetry London.

== Selected publications ==
- After the Creel Fleet, HappenStance Press, 2011 (pamphlet)
- Moontide, Bloodaxe Books, 2014
- First Nights: Poems, Princeton Series of Contemporary Poets, Princeton University Press, 2017 (selected and new poems)
- Noctuary, Bloodaxe Books, 2019
- The Island in the Sound, Bloodaxe Books, 2024

== Awards ==
- Eric Gregory Award (2011)
- Robert Louis Stevenson Fellowship (2011)
- Edwin Morgan Poetry Prize (2014)
- Saltire Society First Book of the Year Award, Moontide (2014)
- Shortlisted for the Forward Poetry Prize for best first collection of poetry (2014)
- Shortlisted for the Aldeburgh Prize for the best first collection of poetry (2014)
- Shortlisted for the Forward Poetry Prize for best collection (2019)
- Shortlisted for Scotland's National Book Awards Scottish Poetry Book of the Year (2025)
