= William Ferguson (historian) =

Scottish historian (1924–2021)

William Ferguson (19 February 1924 – 8 January 2021) was a Scottish academic and author who specialised in the history of Scotland. He studied history at Glasgow and Oxford, and spent most of his academic career at the University of Edinburgh. He retired from teaching in 1989, but continued his research and his writing, publishing The Identity of the Scottish Nation: An Historic Quest in 1998. He died on 8 January 2021, aged 96.

== Early life and education ==
Ferguson was born in Muirkirk in on 19 February 1924. His father worked on the railway line between Muirkirk and Lanark, and in the 1930s gained a promotion that caused him to move to Glasgow. Ferguson had intended to study medicine, and in the Second World War was called up to work as a naval medic; after the war however, he decided to study history. He completed his first undergraduate degree at the University of Glasgow, and in 1950 he went enrolled at Balliol College, Oxford where he spent two years, before returning to Glasgow to complete his PhD.

== Career ==
After completing his doctorate, Ferguson worked as an assistant lecturer at Glasgow before moving to Edinburgh in 1954. He was promoted to lecturer, then senior lecturer, and ultimately was awarded a readership in the 1970s. He retired from the University of Edinburgh in 1989, but continued to write, research, and review the work of other scholars.

== Works ==
Ferguson's first book, Scotland: 1689 to the Present, published in 1968, was an analysis of Scotland's history following the union with England in 1707. In 1977 he published Relations with England: A Survey to 1707, which explored Scotland's relationship with England prior to the union. His 1998 book The Identity of the Scottish Nation: An Historic Quest was awarded Saltire Society's award for Scottish history, although it was criticised by Roger Mason for what he perceived as the book's failure to engage with other scholars' contributions on the subject of Scottish identity.

== Sources ==
- Murdoch, Alexander (5 February 2021). "Obituary: William Ferguson, respected Scottish historian and author". The Scotsman.
- Murdoch, Alexander (April 2022). "William Ferguson (18 February 1924–8 January 2021): An Appreciation". Scottish Historical Review. 101 (1): 137–142. doi:10.3366/shr.2022.0551. ISSN 0036-9241.
- Cowan, Edward; Finlay, Richard. "Obituary: William Ferguson, brilliant Scots historian driven by a scholarly integrity". The Herald.
- Mason, Roger (October 2000). "The Identity of the Scottish Nation: An Historic Quest by William Ferguson". The Scottish Historical Review. 79 (208): 240–242.
