= Jellyfish (short story collection) =

2015 short story collection by Scottish writer Janice Galloway

- Author: Janice Galloway
- Language: English
- Publication date: 2015
- Publication place: Ireland
- Media type: Print

Jellyfish is a short story collection by Scottish author Janice Galloway, published by Freight Books in 2015.

== Major themes ==
In the epigraph to Jellyfish, Galloway notes that she seeks to redefine David Lodge's idea that "literature is mostly about having sex and not much about having children; life's the other way around". Throughout the 14 stories in Jellyfish, Galloway connects the themes sex, love, and parenthood, as well as both mental and physical illnesses.

== Reception and awards ==
Jellyfish was shortlisted for the Saltire Society Literary Award in 2015 in literary fiction and longlisted for the Frank O'Connor International Short Story Award.
