= Meaghan Delahunt =

Australian born Scottish novelist

- Born: 1961 (age 64–65); Melbourne, Australia

Meaghan Delahunt (born 1961) is a novelist. She was born in Melbourne, Australia and now lives on the East Coast of Scotland. In 2004 she was Writer in Residence in the Management School at St Andrews University, and she now lectures in Creative Writing at the University of Stirling.

In 1997 she won the Flamingo/HQ national short story prize in Australia.

Delahunt's first novel, In the Blue House (Bloomsbury, 2001), won a regional Commonwealth Prize for Best First Book in 2002, the Saltire Award for First Novel, a Scottish Arts Council Book of the year award, was longlisted for the Orange Prize and shortlisted for Christina Stead Prize for fiction in the New South Wales Premier's Literary Awards. Her second novel, The Red Book (Granta, 2008), was shortlisted for the Saltire Book of the Year award for 2008.

Delahunt was awarded a UNESCO Aschberg literature residency and Scottish Arts Council bursary in 2000 and an Asialink literature residency in 2002.

== Bibliography ==
- In the Blue House, (Bloomsbury, 2002) ISBN 0-7475-5765-9 review Socialist Worker review Socialist Action
- The Red Book (Granta, 2008)
- To the Island (Granta, 2011)
- Greta Garbo’s Feet & Other Stories (Word Power Women, 2015)
- The Night-Side of the Country (UWA Publishing, 2020)
