= Peter Ross (author) =

Scottish journalist and non-fiction author

- Born: Scotland
- Occupations: Journalist, author
- Writing career
- Genres: Non-fiction, travel writing, cultural history
- Notable works: A Tomb With a View (2020); Steeple Chasing (2023); Upon a White Horse (2025)
- Notable awards: Saltire Society Scottish Non-Fiction Book of the Year (2021)

Peter Ross is a Scottish journalist and non-fiction author based in Glasgow. He won a Scottish Press Award for A Tomb with a View and was a finalist for the Orwell Prize for Journalism in 2015. A Tomb With a View and Upon a White Horse have both been adapted as BBC Radio 4 Book of the Week.

His work has appeared in publications including The Guardian, The Times, National Geographic Traveler, Smithsonian Magazine and Boston Review.

Ross lives in Glasgow.

== Awards and recognition ==
A Tomb with a View was named a book of the year by the Financial Times, i, and Stylist.

Steeple Chasing was a Sunday Times bestseller and Waterstones Non-Fiction Book of the Month.

Upon a White Horse was named a Radio 4 Book of the Week and named a best book of 2025 by the Financial Times, The Scotsman, and Country Life.

Awards for Ross's work
| Year | Title | Award | Result | Ref. |
|---|---|---|---|---|
| 2015 | | Orwell Prize for Journalism | Shortlist | |
| 2017 | The Passion of Harry Bingo | Saltire Society Scottish Non-Fiction Book of the Year | Shortlist | |
| 2021 | A Tomb With a View | Saltire Society Scottish Non-Fiction Book of the Year | Winner | |

== Books ==
- Ross, Peter (2014). Daunderlust: Dispatches from Unreported Scotland. Sandstone Press. ISBN 978-1908737762.
- Ross, Peter (2017). The Passion of Harry Bingo: Further Dispatches from Unreported Scotland. Sandstone Press. ISBN 978-1910985816.
- Ross, Peter (2020). A Tomb With a View: The Stories & Glories of Graveyards. Headline. ISBN 978-1-472-26779-5.
- Ross, Peter (2024). Steeple Chasing: Around Britain by Church. Headline. ISBN 978-1-472-28195-1.
- Ross, Peter (2025). Upon a White Horse: Journeys in Ancient Britain and Ireland. Headline. ISBN 978-1-035-41406-2.
