= Charles McKean =

Scottish historian (1946–2013)

- Born: 16 July 1946; Glasgow, Scotland
- Died: 29 September 2013 (aged 67); Edinburgh, Scotland
- Occupation: Historian

Charles McKean (16 July 1946 – 29 September 2013) was a Scottish historian, author and scholar.

Craignethan reconstruction watercolour by Charles McKean

== Biography ==
McKean was born in Glasgow, Scotland, in 1946. He was educated at Fettes College, the University of Poitiers (Tours), and the University of Bristol, from 1977 to 1983.

He was chief executive of the Royal Incorporation of Architects in Scotland (RIAS). McKean was chairman of the board of the UNESCO Edinburgh World Heritage Trust from 2006 to 2012.

He was appointed head of the School of Architecture at Duncan of Jordanstone College of Art and Design in 1995, before taking up his position as Professor of Scottish Architectural History in the History department of the University of Dundee in 1997.

McKean edited the journal London Architect from 1970 to 1975. He was the architecture critic of the Times from 1977 to 1983. and for Scotland on Sunday from 1988 to 1990.

He held fellowships of the Royal Society of Arts, the Royal Society of Edinburgh and the Royal Historical Society, and was an Honorary Fellow of the Royal Institute of British Architects, the Royal Incorporation of Architects in Scotland and the Royal Scottish Geographical Society.

From 2003 to 2009, he was a member of the Scottish committee of the Heritage Lottery Fund, one of many prominent committee positions he occupied. In 2005, he was appointed Honorary President of the St Andrews Preservation Trust.

He was also a prolific author of architecture and history books. He was awarded an Honorary Stephen Fry Award by the University of Dundee in 2012 for his lifetime achievements in engaging the public with his research in Scottish architectural history.

McKean published a number of articles reconstructing the career of the 16th-century courtier and master of work James Hamilton of Finnart. His publications questioned the defensive nature of the Scottish tower house, positing these buildings as expressions of family lineage, antiquity, and traditional forms of hospitality.

=== Death ===
McKean died in Edinburgh in 2013, aged 67.

== Legacy ==
McKean's posthumous work, 'Gender Differentiation in Scottish Royal Palaces', was edited by Monique Chatenet and Krista De Jonge, and published in Le prince, la princesse et leurs logis (Paris, 2014). The paper discusses Stirling Castle and Dunfermline Palace in the times of Mary of Guise and Anne of Denmark.

Following a conference held at Perth in October 2013, with speakers including Miles Kerr-Peterson, called "A New Platform for Scottish Renaissance Studies", an edition of the journal Architectural Heritage, no. XXVI issue 1, was dedicated to his memory. The edition was edited by Dr Sally Rush of Glasgow University. Rush was a consultant on the restoration of the palace interiors at Stirling Castle. The volume includes contributions by his colleagues, friends and students. Essays from four of his students were included, from Charles Wemyss, Michael Pearce, Kate Newland, and William Napier. Alan R. MacDonald presents McKean's drawings, and the other essays were written by architects, historians and archaeologists including Konrad Ottenheym, James Simpson, Dr Shannon Fraser, Dr Marilyn Brown, Dr Aonghus MacKechnie and Professors Richard Oram and Ian Campbell.

== Publications ==
- Guide to Modern Buildings in London 1965–1975 (Warehouse Publishing with Tom Jestico, 1976). ISBN 0-902063-278
- Fight Blight (Littlehampton Book Services, 1977) ISBN 0-7182-1150-2
- Fight Blight, Kaye & Ward, (1977) ISBN 978-0-7182-1169-1
- Dundee, An Illustrated Introduction, with David Walker (Scottish Academic Press and RIAS, 1984). ISBN 0-7073-0387-7
- Stirling and The Trossachs (Scottish Academic Press and RIAS, 1985). ISBN 0-7073-0462-8
- The Scottish Thirties (Scottish Academic Press, 1987). ISBN 0-7073-0494-6
- The District of Moray, An Illustrated Architectural Guide (Scottish Academic Press and RIAS, 1987). ISBN 0-7073-0528-4
- Central Glasgow, An Illustrated Architectural Guide, with David Walker and Frank Arneil Walker, (Mainstream Publications and RIAS, 1989). ISBN 185158-200-2
- Banff & Buchan (RIAS, 1990). ISBN 978-1-85158-231-0
- Edinburgh, An Illustrated Architectural Guide (Rutland Press and RIAS, 1992). ISBN 0-9501462-4-2
- "Craignethan: the Castle of the Bastard of Arran" Proceedings of the Society of Antiquaries of Scotland, 125 (1995), pp. 1069–1090.
- "Technical Conservation, Research and Education in Historic Scotland", Journal of Architectural Conservation, 5:2 (1999), pp. 43–55.
- The Making of the Museum of Scotland (National Museum of Scotland, 2000).
- The Scottish Château: the Country House of the Scottish Renaissance (Sutton, 2001). ISBN 0-7509-2323-7
- Battle for the North: The Tay and Forth Bridges and the 19th-Century Railway Wars (Granta, 2006). ISBN 1-86207-852-1
- "Some Later Jacobean Villas in Scotland", Malcolm Airs, The Renaissance Villa in Britain, 1500–1700 (Spire Books, 2007).
- Lost Dundee, Dundee's lost architectural heritage, with Patricia Whatley, (Birlinn, 2008).
- Dundee, 1600–1800 (Dundee University Press, 2010)
- The Scottish Town in the Age of Enlightenment 1740–1820 with Bob Harris, (2014).
- 'Gender Differentiation in Scottish Royal Palaces' in Monica Chatenet & Krista De Jonge, Le prince, la princesse et leurs logis (Paris, 2014), pp. 93–104. ISBN 978-2-7084-0977-4
