= Tilag =

Tilag تيلگ
- Village
- Location within Iran
- Coordinates: 28°29′11″N 61°30′26″E
- Country: Iran
- Province: Sistan and Baluchestan
- County: Khash
- Bakhsh: Central
- Rural District: Poshtkuh

Population (2006)
  - Total: 243
- Time zone: UTC+3:30 (IRST)
  - Summer (DST): UTC+4:30 (IRDT)

Tilag (Persian: تيلگ, also Romanized as Tīlag; also known as Neylak and Tīlak) is a village in Poshtkuh Rural District, in the Central District of Khash County, Sistan and Baluchestan Province, Iran. At the 2006 census, its population was 243, in 39 families.
