= Polly Clark =

Canadian-British poet

Polly clark
- Born: 1968 (age 57–58); Toronto, Canada
- Citizenship: Canadian
- Education: University of Liverpool; Oxford Brookes University
- Occupations: Writer, poet
- Writing career
- Language: English
- Years active: 1997–present
- Notable works: Larchfield (2017); Tiger (2019)
- Notable awards: Eric Gregory Award (1997)

Polly Clark (born 1968) is a Canadian-born British writer and poet. She is the author of Larchfield (2017), which fictionalised a youthful period in the life of poet W. H. Auden, and Tiger (2019) about a last dynasty of wild Siberian tigers. She has published four critically acclaimed volumes of poetry. She lives in Helensburgh, Scotland.

== Early life and education ==
Clark was born in Toronto and came to the UK as a child, growing up in Cumbria, Lancashire and the Scottish Borders. She graduated with a degree in English and Philosophy from the University of Liverpool and completed a Master of Arts (MA) in English literature at Oxford Brookes University.

== Career ==
Between 2007 and 2017 she produced the Literature Programme at Cove Park, Scotland's International Artist Residency Centre, near Helensburgh. She was poet in residence for the Southern Daily Echo and chaired and presented the author Richard Ford on an Arts Council England funded tour of theatres in south-east England in 2004. She has held other jobs to support her writing, including a period as a teacher of English in Hungary, working in publishing at Oxford University Press, and as a zookeeper at Edinburgh Zoo.

Since winning the Eric Gregory Award for young poets in 1997, she has published three collections of poetry and one pamphlet. Her poetry has been shortlisted for the TS Eliot Prize and the Michael Marks Award.

Her first novel, Larchfield, was published in March 2017 and is based on the little known period spent by W. H. Auden as a teacher at the Larchfield Academy, now amalgamated into Lomond School, in Helensburgh, Scotland (where he wrote The Orators). Larchfield won the 2015 Mslexia Women's Novel Competition (under its draft title, When Auden Met Dora). It received praise from Margaret Atwood, Richard Ford and Louis de Bernieres. David Robinson in The National and Books from Scotland calls it "layered, clever, captivating". John Boyne 'Magical and transcendent . . . I suspect that few debuts in 2017 will match the elegance of Larchfield. This is a beautiful novel: passionate, lyrical and surprising. I will remember Larchfield for a long time.'. Stuart Kelly in The Scotsman was critical, saying "it is not a work for which I would recommend a reader parting with money".

In 2017, Clark contributed to a BBC2 documentary on Auden's life, directed by BAFTA winning Adam Low and wrote a piece for the Guardian on childbirth. With the poet Glyn Maxwell and the writer and cultural commentator Matthew Sweet she discussed W.H. Auden's Age of Anxiety on BBC Radio 3 for the 2018 BBC Proms Production of Leonard Bernstein's symphonic interpretation of the poet's work: Age of Anxiety.

Writing in the Guardian, Liz Jensen placed Clark's 'unsettling and immersive' second novel Tiger in a vanguard of books along with Laline Paull's The Bees and Richard Powers's The Overstory which approach non-human life in new ways. Allan Massie in The Scotsman described it as 'magnificent and terrifying', adding that the novel 'will doubtless sell very well – and deservedly so'. To research the novel Clark undertook a tiger tracking expedition to the remote Russian taiga. Tiger was shortlisted in 2019 Saltire Book of the Year Awards.

== Works ==
=== Poetry collections ===
- Kiss (Bloodaxe Books 2000; Poetry Book Society Recommendation)
- Take Me With You (Bloodaxe Books 2005; Poetry Book Society Choice; shortlisted for the T. S. Eliot Prize)
- Farewell My Lovely (Bloodaxe Books 2009)
- A Handbook for the Afterlife A Pamphlet (Templar 2015; shortlisted for the Michael Marks Awards)

=== Novels ===
- Larchfield (Quercus 2017; winner of the MsLexia Women's Novel Competition)
- Tiger (Quercus 2019; shortlisted for the Saltire Scottish Novel of the Year 2019)
- Ocean (Eye Press 2025)
