= Nilak, Sistan and Baluchestan =

Nilak نيلك
- Village
- Location within Iran
- Coordinates: 25°18′45″N 61°16′04″E
- Country: Iran
- Province: Sistan and Baluchestan
- County: Chabahar
- Bakhsh: Dashtiari
- Rural District: Sand-e Mir Suiyan

Population (2006)
  - Total: 72
- Time zone: UTC+3:30 (IRST)
  - Summer (DST): UTC+4:30 (IRDT)

Nilak (Persian: نيلك, also Romanized as Nīlak; also known as Kīln) is a village in Sand-e Mir Suiyan Rural District, Dashtiari District, Chabahar County, Sistan and Baluchestan Province, Iran. At the 2006 census, its population was 72, in 15 families.
