= Publishing Scotland =

Trade association

Publishing Scotland is a trade association for the publishing industry in Scotland.

It was established in 1973 as the Scottish General Publishers Association with the support of the Scottish Arts Council. It was subsequently known as the Scottish Publishers Association (SPA), with a membership primarily comprising book and academic publishers, local authority libraries and public bodies. In April 2007, name Publishing Scotland was adopted, and the group's remit was extended to support individuals and companies working within the publishing industry, such as freelance editors, illustrators, and printing firms.

On behalf of its members, Publishing Scotland attends trade fairs throughout Europe; co-ordinates bookshop and library promotions, and other marketing initiatives; runs training courses and seminars; and implements joint research projects and surveys with organisations such as Creative Scotland and VisitScotland. Publishing Scotland is also involved in the annual Edinburgh International Book Festival. It runs a website showcasing Scottish-interest books, booksfromscotland.com. It is the majority owner of BookSource, a warehousing and worldwide distribution service for trade publishers, charities and other commercial enterprises.

The SPA formerly compiled a list of best-selling Scottish books, which was criticised in 2005 when a book was included in the top ten, despite not selling any copies.

== See also ==
- International Publishers Association
- Book trade in the United Kingdom
- Books in the United Kingdom
