= The Kiln =

1996 novel by William McIlvanney

- First edition
- Author: William McIlvanney
- Publisher: Hodder & Stoughton
- Publication date: 19 September 1996
- Pages: 277
- ISBN: 9780340657355

The Kiln is a novel by William McIlvanney, first published in 1996.

== Plot ==
The Kiln is a sequel to Docherty and follows the life of the same family two generations later.

== Awards ==
- 1996 - Saltire Society Scottish Book of the Year Award
