= Janice Galloway =

Scottish writer (born 1955)

Janice Galloway FRSL
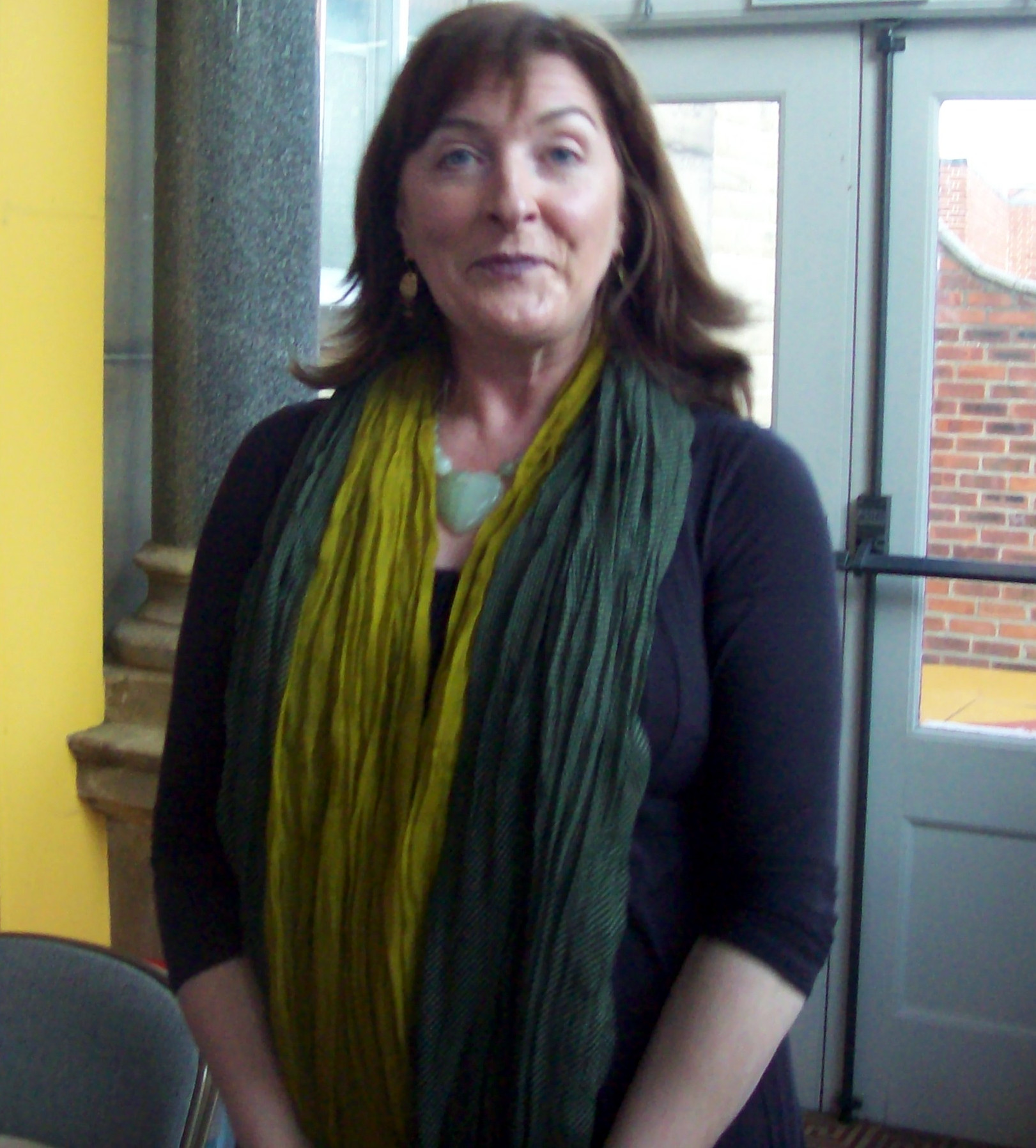
- Galloway in 2011
- Born: 2 December 1955 (age 70); Saltcoats, Ayrshire, Scotland
- Education: Glasgow University
- Occupation: Writer
- Writing career
- Period: Contemporary
- Genres: General fiction, nonfiction, poetry, collaborative text
- Notable work: The Trick is to Keep Breathing (1989)
- Notable awards: MIND Book of the Year, Allen Lane Award, E. M. Forster Award, McVitie's Award for Book of the Year, Saltire Award, Creative Scotland Award, SMIT non-fiction Book of the Year.
- Website: www.janicegalloway.net

Janice Galloway FRSL (born 1955 in Saltcoats, Scotland) is a Scottish writer of novels, short stories, prose-poetry, non-fiction and libretti. In 2023, she was elected a Fellow of the Royal Society of Literature. In 2024 she was awarded an honorary degree (DLitt) by the University of Glasgow.

== Biography ==
She is the second daughter of James Galloway and Janet Clark McBride. Her parents separated when she was four and her father died when she was six. Her sister Nora, sixteen years older, died in 2000 from smoking-related illness. Janice Galloway's secondary education was at Ardrossan Academy, which is described in the memoir All Made Up. She studied Music and English at Glasgow University, then worked as a school teacher for ten years, before turning to writing.

She was the first Scottish Arts Council writer in residence to four prisons (HMPs Cornton Vale, Dungavel, Barlinnie and Polmont YOI) and was the Times Literary Supplement Research Fellow to the British Library in 1999. Her awards include: MIND/Allan Lane Award (for The Trick is to Keep Breathing), the McVitie's Prize (for Foreign Parts), the E.M. Forster Award (presented by the American Academy of Arts and Letters), the Creative Scotland Award, Saltire Book of the Year (for Clara) and the SMIT non-fiction Book of the Year for This is not about Me and Scottish Best Book of the Year 2012 for All Made Up.

She has written and presented three radio series for BBC Scotland (Life as a Man, Imagined Lives and Chopin's Scottish Swansong) and works extensively with musicians and visual artists including Sally Beamish, Anne Bevan, Michael Wolchover, Norman McBeath, Alasdair Nicolson and James McNaught. Her books Clara and This is Not About Me were recorded for the RNIB Talking Books service by the author in 2004 and 2009 respectively. This is Not about Me and All Made Up are available to buy.

She collaborated with Anne Bevan to create Rosengarten, an exhibition at the Hunterian Museum in Glasgow in 2004. Inspired by research into obstetric instruments and the mechanics of childbirth, it featured nine light tables with sculptural pieces in bronze, plaster and fabric by Bevan with poems and text by Galloway.

In December 2008 she was a guest on Private Passions, the biographical music discussion programme on BBC Radio 3, and regularly discusses music, writing and The Scottish Question at public appearances.

Galloway wrote the glosses on Bronte's Shirley and Eliot's Felix Holt and Middlemarch in The Book of Prefaces, edited by Alasdair Gray.

== Works ==
=== Novels ===
- The Trick is to Keep Breathing (Polygon, 1989)
- Foreign Parts (Jonathan Cape, 1994)
- Clara (Jonathan Cape, 2002). Based on the life of Clara Schumann.

=== Collections of short stories ===
- Blood (Secker & Warburg, 1991)
- Where You Find It (Jonathan Cape, 1996)
- Collected Stories (Vintage, 2009)
- Jellyfish (Freight Books, 2015; Granta, 2019)

She has been widely anthologised in collections and translation since 1990.

=== Poetry ===
- Boy Book See (Mariscat, 2002)

=== Other texts ===
- Chute (1998). French play/monologue commissioned by the Traverse Theatre.
- Pipelines (2000). Prose and poetry text to accompany Anne Bevan's exhibition "undercovered".
- Monster (2002). Opera libretto for Sally Beamish and Scottish Opera.
- Rosengarten (2004). A book of prose and poetry, matched with an exhibition of obstetrical implements by Anne Bevan.
- This is Not About Me (Granta, 2008). "Anti-memoir/true novel" listed by publisher as memoir.
- All Made Up (Granta, 2011). "Anti-memoir/true novel" listed by publisher as memoir.
