= Gutter (magazine) =

Biannual Scottish magazine

- Categories: Literary magazine
- Frequency: Biannual
- Founder: Adriean Searle, Colin Begg
- Founded: 2009
- Country: United Kingdom
- Based in: Glasgow
- Language: English, Scots, Gaelic
- Website: Gutter

Gutter is a biannual periodical published in Scotland. The magazine was founded in 2009 and is independently published in Glasgow. The magazine is cooperatively owned and run by its workers.

== Overview ==
Publishing prose, poetry and reviews, the magazine is 192 pages long and is a biannual publication. Notable Gutter contributors have included Alasdair Gray, Janice Galloway, Liz Lochhead, Louise Welsh, Ron Butlin, James Kelman and Alexander Hutcheson as well as new writers.

== Editors ==
Managing editor Henry Bell and lead editors Colin Begg and Kate MacLeary are joined by five other editors – Laura Waddell, Calum Rodger, Robbie Guillory, Katy Hastie, and Ryan Vance.
