= List of Scottish writers =

This list of Scottish writers is an incomplete alphabetical list of Scottish writers who have a Wikipedia page. Those on the list were born and/or brought up in Scotland. They include writers of all genres, writing in English, Lowland Scots, Scottish Gaelic, Latin, French or any other language. Please help by adding new names, using the present entry format as far as possible. Writers put on the list who are still without a Wikipedia page have been transferred to the "No-pagers" section on the Talk page.

Abbreviations used: awa = also writes/wrote as, b. = born, c. = circa, fl. = floruit (flourished), or. = originally, RC = Roman Catholic, SF = science fiction, YA = young-adult.

This is a subsidiary list to the List of Scots.

== A ==
- John Abercrombie (1726–1806), horticulturalist and garden writer
- Patrick Abercromby (1665 – c. 1716), historian and physician
- Gilbert Adair (1944–2011), novelist, poet and critic
- Alexander Adam (1741–1809), classicist
- James Adam (1860–1907), classicist
- Jean Adam (1704–1765), poet from the labouring classes
- Marion Adams-Acton (awa Jeanie Hering, 1846–1928), children's writer and playwright
- Ewart Adamson (1882–1945), screenwriter
- Henry Adamson (1581–1639), historian
- Adomnán (627/8–704), biographer (in Latin), Vita Columbae
- Douglas Ainslie (1865–1948), poet, translator and critic
- Thomas Aird (1802–1876), poet
- Alasdair MacMhaighstir Alasdair (c. 1695–1770), poet
- Gillebríghde Albanach (fl. 1200–1230), poet (in medieval Gaelic)
- William Alexander, 1st Earl of Stirling (c. 1570–1640), poet and dramatist
- William Alexander (1826–1894), journalist and novelist
- Jane Alexander (living), novelist and academic
- Archibald Alison (1757–1839), essayist and Episcopal cleric
- Archibald Alison (1792–1867), historian and advocate
- William Alison (1790–1859), social reformer and physician
- Mea Allan (1909–1982), journalist and novelist
- Adam Anderson (1692/1693–1765), economist
- Alan Orr Anderson (1879–1958), historian
- James Anderson (1662–1728), historian
- James Anderson (1835–1922), poet and songwriter
- James Anderson of Hermiston (1739–1808), economist and farmer
- James Robertson Anderson (1811–1895), playwright and actor
- John Anderson (1726–1796), natural philosopher and reformer
- Lin Anderson (living), crime writer
- Marjorie Ogilvie Anderson (1909–2002), historian
- Patrick Anderson (fl.1618–1635), author and physician
- Andrew of Wyntoun (c. 1350 – c. 1423), poet (in Early Scots), Orygynale Cronykil of Scotland
- Aneirin (fl. c. 575 – c. 600), bard (in Brythonic)
- James Stout Angus (1830–1923), poet (in English and Shetland dialect)
- Marion Angus (1866–1946), poet (in Braid Scots)
- J. K. Annand (1908–1993), poet, best known for his children's poems
- Alexander Arbuthnot (1538–1583), poet and Church of Scotland minister
- John Arbuthnot (c. 1667–1735), physician, satirist and polymath
- William Archer (1856–1924), critic and translator
- Campbell Armstrong (1944–2013), novelist
- Hugo Arnot (1749–1786), writer and lawyer
- William Arnot (1808–1875), minister and theological writer
- Neal Ascherson (b. 1932), journalist and writer
- David Ashton (b. 1941), screenwriter, novelist and actor
- Margot Asquith (1864–1945), writer and wit
- William Auld (1924–2006), poet and writer (in Esperanto and English)
- Robert Aytoun (1570–1638), poet
- William Edmonstoune Aytoun (1813–1865), poet, humorist and writer

== B ==
- William Balfour Baikie (1824–1864), naturalist and philologist
- Lady Grizel Baillie (1665–1746), song-writer
- Joanna Baillie (1762–1851), poet and dramatist
- Alan Balatine (fl. 1520–1560), historian
- James Balfour (c. 1600 – c. 1658), annalist and antiquary
- Patrick Balfour, Lord Kinross (1904–1976), historian and biographer
- R. M. Ballantyne (1825–1894), children's novelist, The Coral Island
- Iain Banks (awa Iain M. Banks, 1954–2013), novelist
- Anne Bannerman (1765–1829), poet
- John Bannerman (1932–2008), historian
- John Barbour (1316–1395), poet (in Early Scots)
- William Barclay (1546–1608), jurist and author
- William Barclay (c. 1570 – c. 1630), writer on miscellaneous subjects
- Elspeth Barker (1940–2022), novelist and journalist
- Lady Anne Barnard (1750–1825), poet and correspondent
- John Baron (1786–1851), biographer of Edward Jenner
- Damian Barr (b. 1976), columnist and playwright
- William Barr (b. 1940), historian of the Arctic
- J. M. Barrie (1860–1937), novelist, playwright and children's writer, Peter Pan
- Carole Barrowman (b. 1959), co-author with John Barrowman, and Professor of English and Director of Creative Studies in Writing
- Meg Bateman (b. 1959), scholar and poet (in Gaelic)
- Alistair Beaton (b. 1947), satirist and novelist
- James Beattie (1735–1803), poet and moral philosopher
- Eric Temple Bell (1883–1960), science fiction writer
- J. J. Bell (1871–1934), story writer and poet (in Scots and English)
- John Bellenden or Bannatyne (c. 1495 – pre–1548), poet and translator (in Middle Scots)
- Margot Bennett (1912–1980), thriller writer
- Julie Bertagna (b. 1962), children's and YA writer
- Erskine Beveridge (1851–1920), historian and industrialist
- Alan Bissett (b. 1975), novelist and playwright (in Scots and English)
- David MacLeod Black (b. 1941), poet and psychoanalyst
- J. B. Black (1883–1964), historian
- Margaret Moyes Black (1853–1935), novelist and biographer
- William Black (1841–1898), novelist
- Sheena Blackhall (b. 1947), poet, fiction writer and story teller
- John Stuart Blackie (1809–1895), classicist and translator
- Thomas Blackwell (1701–1757), classicist and historian
- William Garden Blaikie (1820–1899), religious writer, biographer and Free Church of Scotland minister
- Iain Blair (wrote as Emma Blair, 1942–2011), romantic novelist and actor
- Robert Blair (1699–1746), poet
- Blind Harry (awa Harry the Minstrel, c. 1440–1492), poet (in Middle Scots), The Wallace
- Hector Boece (awa Boethius, 1465–1536), historian and biographer
- Alan Bold (1943–1998), poet and biographer
- Horatius Bonar (1808–1889), poet
- Alastair Borthwick (1913–2003), author and broadcaster
- James Boswell (1740–1795), biographer and diarist, Life of Samuel Johnson
- Alexander Bower (fl. 1804–1830), biographer
- Walter Bower (c. 1385–1449), chronicler (in Latin) and abbot, Scotichronicon
- Don Boyd (b. 1948), novelist and film director
- Edward Boyd (1916–1989), screenwriter
- Mark Alexander Boyd (1562–1601), poet (in Latin and Middle Scots)
- William Boyd (b. 1952), novelist and screenwriter
- M. C. Bradbrook (1909–1993), critic and scholar
- Rory Bremner (b. 1961), screenwriter, comedian and translator
- Theresa Breslin (living), young adult writer
- James Bridie (real name Osborne Henry Mavor, 1888–1951), playwright, screenwriter and surgeon
- Eliza Brightwen (1830–1906), naturalist
- George Brodie (c. 1786–1867), historian
- Denis William Brogan (1900–1974), political scientist
- Christopher Brookmyre (b. 1968), novelist
- Dauvit Broun (b. 1961), historian
- George Douglas Brown (1869–1902), novelist, The House with the Green Shutters
- George Mackay Brown (1921–1996), Orcadian poet, writer and playwright
- Gordon Brown (living), crime writer
- Hamish Brown (b. 1934), writer on walking
- James Brown (known as J. B. Selkirk, 1832–1904), Scottish poet and essayist
- John Brown (1722–1787), theologian and minister of the Secession Church
- John Brown (1784–1858), theologian and minister of the Secession Church
- John Brown (1810–1882), essayist and physician
- Peter Hume Brown (1849–1918), historian
- Mary Brunton (1778–1818), novelist
- Bill Bryden (born 1942), screenwriter and stage and film director
- John Buchan, 1st Baron Tweedsmuir (1875–1940), novelist, The Thirty-Nine Steps
- Dugald Buchanan (Dùghall Bochanan, 1716–1768), poet and Bible translator (in Scots and Gaelic)
- George Buchanan (1506–1582), historian and humanist (in Latin, Middle Scots and English)
- Geoffrey Bull (1921–1999), religious writer
- Rhoda Bulter (1929–1994), poet and novelist
- Mary Anne Burges (1763–1813), novelist, geologist and botanist
- Haldane Burgess (1862–1927), poet, novelist and historian
- Gregory Burke (b. 1968), playwright, Black Watch
- Gilbert Burnet (1643–1715), theologian, historian and bishop
- John Burnet (1863–1928), classicist
- James Burnett (1714–1799), judge and philosopher
- Robert Burns (1759–1796), national poet and lyricist (in Lowland Scots and English)
- John Burnside (b. 1955), poet and novelist
- John Hill Burton (1809–1881), historian and economist
- John Byrne (b. 1940), playwright

== C ==
- Maoilios Caimbeul (b. 1944), poet and children's writer (in Gaelic)
- Janet Caird (1913–1992), poet, mystery writer, children's writer, teacher
- John Cairncross (1913–1995), scholar, translator and spy
- John Cairns (1818–1892), religious writer and minister of the United Presbyterian Church of Scotland
- Angus Calder (1942–2008), literary critic and historian
- Jenni Calder (née Daiches) (b. 1941), literary historian
- Peter Ritchie Calder, Baron Ritchie-Calder of Balmashanner (1906–1982), socialist author, journalist and academic
- David Calderwood (1575–1650), historian and Presbyterian minister
- Henry Calderwood (1830–1897), philosopher and minister of the United Presbyterian Church of Scotland
- Allan Cameron (b. 1952), novelist and translator
- Norman Cameron (1905–1953), poet
- A. Y. Campbell (1885–1958), classicist and poet
- Angus Peter Campbell (b. 1954), novelist, columnist and poet (in Gaelic)
- Dorothea Primrose Campbell (1793–1863), poet and novelist
- Elizabeth Duncan Campbell (1804–1878), working-class poet and autobiographical writer
- Harriette Campbell (1817–1841), novelist
- James Campbell (b. 1951), biographer and literary journalist
- James Dykes Campbell (1838–1895), biographer and scholar
- John Campbell (1708–1775), historian, novelist and translator
- Karen Campbell (b. 1968), crime writer
- Lewis Campbell (1830–1908), classicist
- Rod Campbell (b. 1945), children's writer and illustrator
- Thomas Campbell (1777–1844), poet
- Jane Welsh Carlyle (1801–1866), writer, and wife of Thomas Carlyle
- Thomas Carlyle (1795–1881), essayist and historian
- Alexander Carmichael (1832–1912), writer and ethnographer
- Alison Carmichael (c. 1792–1885), novelist and writer
- Catherine Carswell (1879–1946), biographer, novelist and critic
- Sìleas na Ceapaich (fl. 1660–1729), female Gaelic poet
- George Chalmers (1742–1825), antiquary and historian
- Thomas Chalmers (1780–1847), theologian, economist and Free Church of Scotland minister
- Robert Chambers (1802–1871), thinker and publisher, Vestiges of the Natural History of Creation
- Glenn Chandler (b. 1949), playwright, novelist and screenwriter
- Marion Chesney (awa M. C. Beaton, etc., 1936–2019), genre novelist
- Alexander Campbell Cheyne (1924–2006), church historian
- Kate Clanchy (b. 1965), poet and playwright
- Elizabeth Clark (1918–1978), Scottish poet and playwright
- Ralph Clark (1755 or 1762–1794), diarist and Royal Marines officer
- Thomas Clark (b. 1980), poet and novelist
- William Robinson Clark (1829–1912), theologian, biographer and Church of England cleric
- William Cleland (1661–1689), poet and soldier
- John Clerk of Eldin (1728–1812), naval writer and merchant
- J. Storer Clouston (1870–1944), novelist and historian
- Michael Cobley (b. 1959), science fiction and fantasy writer
- Alison Cockburn (awa Alison Rutherford, 1712–1794), poet and wit
- Henry Cockburn (1779–1854), writer and lawyer
- James Cockburn (1882–1973), church historian and Church of Scotland minister
- Jenny Colgan (also Jane Beaton and J. T. Colgan, b. 1972), novelist and science fiction writer
- John Colville (c. 1540–1605), historian and politician
- George Combe (1788–1858), phrenologist and lawyer
- Stewart Conn (b. 1936), poet and playwright
- Sophie Cooke (b. 1976), novelist, poet and travel writer
- Dominic Cooper (b. 1944), novelist, poet and watchmaker
- Grace Corbett (also M. Corbett, (c. 1765/1770–1843)
- Joe Corrie (1894–1968), poet, playwright and collier
- John William Cousin (1849–1910), biographer
- Helen Craik (1751–1825), novelist and poet
- John Adam Cramb (awa R. A. Revermont, 1862–1913), historian and novelist
- James Brown Craven (1850–1924), church historian and Episcopal minister
- Robert Crawford (b. 1959), poet, scholar and critic
- George Crawfurd (1681–1748), genealogist and historian
- John Crawfurd (1783–1868), writer and colonial administrator
- Andrew Crichton (1790–1855), biographer and historian
- Samuel Rutherford Crockett (1860–1914), novelist
- A. J. Cronin (1896–1981), novelist and physician, Dr. Finlay
- Helen Cruickshank (1886–1975), poet (in Braid Scots and English)
- Andrew Crumey (b. 1961), novelist
- Charles Cumming (b. 1971), spy novelist
- Allan Cunningham (1784–1842), poet, novelist and biographer
- Joseph Davey Cunningham (1812–1851), historian
- Lady Margaret Cunningham (d. c. 1622), memoirist and correspondent
- Peter Cunningham (1816–1869), topographical writer and biographer
- Walterina Cunningham (also M. Corbett, died 1837)
- Anne Jane Cupples (1839–1896), children's writer
- Ivor Cutler (1923–2006), poet, musician and humorist

== D ==
- David Daiches (1912–2005), critic and scholar
- David Dalrymple, Lord Hailes (1726–1792), historian and judge
- John Dalrymple (1726–1810), historian and judge, Memoirs of Great Britain and Ireland
- William Dalrymple (b. 1965), historian and travel writer
- John Graham Dalyell (1775–1851), antiquary and translator
- John Davidson (1857–1909), poet, playwright and novelist
- Thomas Davidson (1840–1900), philosopher
- Carol Anne Davis (b. 1961), crime writer
- Christine De Luca (b. 1947), poet, writing in English and Shetland dialect
- Charlotte Louisa Hawkins Dempster (1835–1913), novelist, essayist and collector of folklore
- Thomas Dempster (1579–1625), scholar and historian (in Latin)
- Lavinia Derwent (real name Elizabeth Dodd, 1909–1989), children's writer, broadcaster and memoirist
- Tom Devine (b. 1945), historian
- Henry Dewar (1771–1823), writer, minister of religion and physician
- Imtiaz Dharker (b. 1954), poet, artist and filmmaker
- Anne Dick (d. 1741), comic poet
- Des Dillon (b. 1960), novelist, poet and screenwriter
- Lady Florence Dixie (1855–1905), feminist, travel writer and novelist
- James Main Dixon (1856–1933), writer, teacher and scholar of the Scots language
- Mary Diana Dods (pen name David Lyndsay, 1790–1830), writer of books, short stories, etc.
- Gordon Donaldson (1913–1993), historian
- James Donaldson (1831–1915), classicist and theologian
- Anne Donovan (b. 1956), novelist
- Colin Douglas (real name Colin Thomas Currie, b. 1945), novelist and physician
- Gavin Douglas (1474–1522), makar, translator (in Middle Scots) and bishop
- George Brisbane Scott Douglas (1856–1935), poet and biographer
- O. Douglas (1877–1948), novelist
- Norman Douglas (1868–1952), novelist and travel writer
- Sir Robert Douglas of Glenbervie, 6th Baronet (1694–1770), genealogist responsible for The Baronage of Scotland
- Patrick Edward Dove (1815–1873), economic philosopher
- Sir Arthur Conan Doyle (1859–1930), novelist and short-story writer, Sherlock Holmes
- Andrew Drummond (b. 20th century), novelist and translator
- Henry Drummond (1851–1897), religion and science writer
- William Drummond of Hawthornden (1585–1649), poet
- Carol Ann Duffy (b. 1955), poet laureate and playwright
- John Duignan (1946–2019), novelist and comedy writer
- James Dunbar (d. 1798), moral philosopher (in Latin and English)
- William Dunbar (c. 1460 – c. 1520), poet (in Middle Scots)
- Andrew Duncan (1744–1828), medical writer and physician
- Archie Duncan (1926–2017), historian
- Dave Duncan (1933–2018), fantasy and science-fiction writer
- Hal Duncan (b. 1971), fantasy and science-fiction and writer
- Henry Duncan (1774–1846), social reformer, geologist, religion writer, novelist, and minister of the Free Church of Scotland
- Jane Duncan (real name Elizabeth Jane Cameron, 1910–1976), novelist and children's writer
- Binnie Dunlop (1874–1946), medical doctor and eugenicist
- John Colin Dunlop (c. 1785–1842), historian
- Douglas Dunn (1942–2026), poet and critic
- Dorothy Dunnett (1923–2001), historical novelist, Lymond Chronicles

== E ==
- Marriott Edgar (1880–1951), Scottish poet and scriptwriter
- Arthur Edmondston (1776–1841), Scottish physician and writer on the Shetland Isles
- John Elder (fl. 1542–1565), cartographer, tutor and writer
- Charlotte Elliot (1839–1880), poet
- Jean Elliot (1727–1805), poet (in Scots)
- Margaret Elphinstone (b. 1948), novelist
- David Erskine (1772–1837), playwright and antiquary
- Ebenezer Erskine (1680–1754), religious writer, diarist and minister of the Secession Church
- Ralph Erskine (1685–1752), poet, religious writer and minister of the Secession Church
- Amber Eve (b. 1976), romance novelist

== F ==
- Michel Faber (b. 1960), novelist
- Jenni Fagan (b. 1977), novelist
- William Falconer (1732–1769), epic poet
- John Fardell (b. 1967), children's writer and cartoonist
- Simon Farquhar (b. 1972), playwright
- Alison Fell (b. 1944), poet and novelist
- Adam Ferguson (1723–1816), philosopher and historian, An Essay on the History of Civil Society
- Craig Ferguson (b. 1962), novelist and screenwriter
- David Ferguson (d. 1598), religion writer and compiler
- Niall Ferguson (b. 1964), historian
- Robert Ferguson (c. 1637–1714), pamphleteer and minister of the Church of Scotland)
- Robert Fergusson (1750–1774), poet (in Braid Scots and English)
- Eric Fernie (b. 1939), art historian
- James Frederick Ferrier (1808–1864), philosopher
- Susan Edmonstone Ferrier (1782–1854), novelist
- Paul John Ferris (b. 1963), writer and criminal
- Bill Findlay (1947–2005), writer and translator
- George Finlay (English-born Scot, 1799–1875), philhellene and Greek historian, founder of the British School at Athens
- Ian Hamilton Finlay (1925–2006), poet and artist
- Iain Finlayson (b. 1945), biographer
- Matthew Fitt (b. 1968), poet and novelist (in Scots)
- Alexander Fleming (1881–1955), biologist and physician
- David Hay Fleming (1849–1931), historian
- John Fleming (1785–1857), naturalist and minister of the Free Church of Scotland
- Marjorie Fleming (1803–1811), child writer and poet
- Andrew Fletcher of Saltoun (1653–1716), political writer
- Aminatta Forna (b. 1964), novelist and memoirist
- Veronica Forrest-Thomson (1947–1975), poet and a critical theorist
- Neil Forsyth (b. 1978), biographer and humorist
- William Fowler (c. 1560–1612), poet and courtier
- Ronald Frame (b. 1953), novelist and short-story writer
- George MacDonald Fraser (1925–2008), historical novelist, The Flashman Papers
- James Baillie Fraser (1783–1856), travel writer
- William Fraser (1816–1898), historian, palaeographer and lawyer
- James George Frazer (1854–1941), anthropologist, The Golden Bough
- Robin Fulton (b. 1937), poet and translator
- Christopher Fyfe (1920–2008), historian

== G ==
- James Gairdner (1828–1912), historian and editor
- Gillian Galbraith (b. 20th century), crime writer and advocate
- Iain Gale (b. 1959), novelist and critic
- Janice Galloway (b. 1956), novelist and short-story writer, The Trick Is to Keep Breathing
- John Galt (1779–1839), novelist (in Lowland Scots and English), Annals of the Parish
- Robert Garioch (1909–1981), poet and translator (in Scots)
- Alexander Geddes (1737–1802), theologian, Bible translator and poet
- Michael Geddes (c. 1650–1713), historian and Anglican cleric
- Sir William Duguid Geddes (1828–1900), Greek scholar and educationalist
- Alexander Gerard (1728–1795), philosopher and minister of the Church of Scotland
- Pat Gerber (1934–2006), novelist and children's writer
- Charles Gibbon (1843–1890), novelist
- Lewis Grassic Gibbon (real name James Leslie Mitchell, 1901–1935), novelist, A Scots Quair
- Magi Gibson (b. 1953), poet and children's writer
- Peter Giles (1860–1935), philologist
- George Gilfillan (1813–1878), author and poet, mentor of the Spasmodic poets
- David Gill (1843–1914), astronomer
- John Gillies (1747–1836), historian and translator
- Robert Pearse Gillies (1789–1858), poet, novelist and non-fiction writer
- Lesley Glaister (b. 1956), novelist and playwright
- Duncan Glen (1933–2008), poet, scholar and editor
- William Glen (1789–1826), poet
- Debi Gliori (b. 1959), children's writer and illustrator
- Sue Glover (b. 1943), theatre, radio and television writer
- Janey Godley (b. 1961), writer and comic
- Alexander Gordon (c. 1692–1755), antiquary
- Alexander Gordon (1841–1931), historian and Unitarian minister
- Richard Gordon (1947–2009), novelist, encyclopedist and travel-guide writer
- Robert Gordon (1786–1853), religion writer, scientist and minister of the Free Church of Scotland
- Robert Gordon of Straloch (1580–1661), poet, antiquary and cartographer
- Thomas Gordon (c. 1691–1750), polemicist and translator
- Clementina Stirling Graham (1782–1877), hostess and writer
- James Graham, 1st Marquess of Montrose (1612–1650), nobleman, soldier and poet
- Robert Graham of Gartmore (1735–1797), poet
- Robert Bontine Cunninghame Graham (1852–1936), writer and politician
- W. S. Graham (1918–1986), poet
- James Grahame (1765–1811), poet
- Kenneth Grahame (1859–1932), short-story writer and children's writer, The Wind in the Willows
- Anne Macvicar Grant (1755–1838), poet and correspondent
- Elizabeth Grant (c. 1745 – c. 1814), songwriter
- James Grant (1822–1887), novelist and historian
- John Grant (b. 1949), science-fiction, fantasy and non-fiction writer
- John Grant (living), children's writer, illustrator and broadcaster
- K. M. Grant (b. 1958), children's writer
- Alasdair Gray (1934–2019), writer and artist
- Alex Gray (b. 1950), crime writer
- Alexander Gray (1882–1968), scholar, poet and translator
- Elizabeth Caroline Gray (1800–1887), archaeologist and travel writer
- Muriel Gray (b. 1958), writer and broadcaster
- Nicholas Stuart Gray (1922–1981), children's writer and actor
- David Gregory (1659–1708), mathematician and astronomer
- Donald Gregory (1803–1836), historian and antiquary
- James Gregory (1638–1675), mathematician and astronomer
- James Gregory (1753–1821), classicist and physician
- John Gregory (1724–1773), moralist and physician
- William Gregory (1803–1858), chemist and translator
- Andrew Greig (b. 1951), novelist, poet and writer on climbing
- David Greig (b. 1969), playwright
- Neil Gunn (1891–1973), novelist and essayist
- Allan Guthrie (b. 1965), crime writer
- Henry Guthrie (c. 1600–1676), historian and bishop
- William Guthrie (1708–1770), historian

== H ==
- Archibald Richard Burdon Haldane (1900–1982), social historian and writer
- James Haldane (1768–1851), theologian and missionary
- John Joseph Haldane (b. 1954), philosopher
- Alastair Hamilton (b. 1958), writer; The Appeal of Fascism
- Janet Hamilton (1795–1873), poet
- Thomas Hamilton (1789–1842), philosopher and novelist
- William Hamilton (1788–1856), philosopher
- Tom Hanlin (1907–1953), novelist
- James Hannay (1827–1873), novelist, journalist and diplomat
- William Hardie (1862–1916), classicist
- Thomas Hardy (1747–1798), historian, religious writer and Church of Scotland minister
- Molly Harrower (1906–1999), clinical psychologist and poet
- Christopher Harvie (b. 1944), historian and politician
- Margaret Hasluck (1885–1948), geographer and ethnographer
- Mary Elizabeth Hawker (1848–1908), writer of short fiction, pseudonym Lanoe Falconer
- George Campbell Hay (1915–1984), poet (in several languages)
- Gilbert Hay (c. 1403 – after 1456), poet (in Early to Middle Scots)
- Ian Hay (real name: John Hay Beith, 1876–1952), playwright and novelist
- John MacDougall Hay (1880–1919), novelist
- Mairi Hedderwick (b. 1939), children's writer and illustrator; Katie Morag
- George Henderson (1866–1912), Gaelic scholar
- Hamish Henderson (1919–2002), poet and folksong collector
- Lizanne Henderson (b. 20th century), historian and ethnographer
- Thomas Finlayson Henderson, (1844–1923), historian, author and editor
- Frances M. Hendry (b. 1941), young adult and children's writer
- Robert Henry (1718–1790), historian
- Robert Henryson (fl. 1460–1500), poet (in Middle Scots)
- Thomas Nicoll Hepburn (wrote as Gabriel Setoun, 1861–1930), poet and novelist
- W. N. Herbert (b. 1961), poet (in English and Scots)
- Jeanie Hering (1846–1928), children's writer, playwright
- Robert Heron (1764–1807), historian and geographer
- William Maxwell Hetherington (1803–1865), poet, historian and Free Church of Scotland minister
- Gilbert Highet (1906–1978), classicist and critic
- James Hogg (1770–1835), poet, novelist and short-story writer
- Henry Home, Lord Kames (1696–1782), writer and lawyer
- John Home (1722–1808), minister of religion and playwright
- Stuart Hood (b. 1915), novelist and translator
- Ian Donald Cochrane Hopkins (b. 1943), comedy writer
- Geoffrey Hosking (b. 1942), historian
- Gerald Howat (1928–2007), cricket writer and historian
- Thomas Hudson (d. c. 1605), poet and translator
- Ben Humble (1903–1977), writer and climber
- Alexander Hume (c. 1560–1609), poet
- Anna Hume (fl. 1644), translator, poet and writer
- David Hume (1711–1776), philosopher and historian; An Enquiry Concerning Human Understanding
- David Hume of Godscroft (1558–1629), historian, political theorist and poet
- Patrick Hume of Polwarth (c. 1550–1609), makar (court poet)
- John Hunt (1827–1907), translator, theologian and Anglican cleric
- Alexander Hunter (1729–1809), science writer and physician
- James Hunter (b. 1948), historian
- Mollie Hunter (1922–2012), young-adult and children's writer
- William Wilson Hunter (1840–1900), historian and statistician

== I ==
- Armando Iannucci (b. 1963), director, producer and writer of film and television; satirist; opera librettist
- Alexander Taylor Innes (1833–1912), church historian, biographer, and lawyer
- Cosmo Innes (1798–1874), historian and antiquary
- Thomas Innes (1662–1744), historian and Roman Catholic priest

== J ==
- Alan Jackson (b. 1938), poet
- Violet Jacob (1863–1946), poet and novelist
- Kathleen Jamie (b. 1962), poet
- Alexander Jamieson (1782–1850), rhetorician, actuary, textbook writer, schoolteacher
- John Jamieson (1759–1838), philologist, antiquary and United Secession Church minister
- Robert Jamieson (c. 1780–1844), antiquary
- Robert Alan Jamieson (b. 1958), poet and novelist
- Quintin Jardine (b. 1945), crime writer
- Alexander Jeffrey (c. 1806–1874), historian and lawyer
- Francis Jeffrey, Lord Jeffrey (1773–1850), critic and judge
- Robin Jenkins (1912–2005), novelist and short-story writer
- John of Fordun (pre-1360 – c. 1384), chronicler (in Latin) and Roman Catholic priest
- Arthur Johnston (c. 1579–1641), poet (in Latin) and physician
- D. D. Johnston (b. 1979), novelist
- Morag Joss (b. 1955), novelist

== K ==
- Ada F. Kay (b. 1929), playwright and biographer
- Jackie Kay (b. 1961), poet and novelist
- John Kay (b. 1948), economist
- Henrietta Keddie (wrote as Sarah Tytler, 1827–1914), novelist and children's writer
- Robert Keith (1681–1757), historian and Episcopal bishop
- Isabella Kelly (1759–1857), novelist and poet
- Mary Kelly (b. 1927), crime writer
- James Kelman (b. 1946), essayist, novelist (A Disaffection), playwright
- James Kennaway (1928–1968), novelist and screenwriter
- A. L. Kennedy (b. 1965), novelist and short-story writer
- Sir Ludovic Kennedy (1919–2009), writer (including journalist), broadcaster, humanist
- Walter Kennedy (c. 1455 – c. 1508), poet (in Middle Scots)
- William Paton Ker (1855–1923), critic and essayist
- Peter Kerr (b. 1940), travel writer and novelist
- Philip Kerr (b. 1956), novelist and children's writer
- Robert Kerr (1755–1813), science writer and translator
- Jessie Kesson (1916–1984), novelist and playwright
- Colin Kidd (b. 1964), historian
- William King (b. 1959), science-fiction and fantasy writer
- Bill Knox (1928–1999), crime writer and broadcaster
- John Knox (c. 1514–1572), religious reformer and theologian
- Angus Konstam (b. 1960), historian
- Frank Kuppner (b. 1951), poet

== L ==
- Ross Laidlaw (b. 1931), fiction writer
- Alexander Laing (1787–1857), Lallans verse writer, known as the Brechin poet
- David Laing (1793–1878), editor and antiquary
- Malcolm Laing (1762–1818), historian
- Samuel Laing (1780–1868), travel writer
- Samuel Laing (1812–1897), politician and writer on science and religion
- Laura Lam (b. 20th century), American expatriate academic and novelist, working in Scotland
- Alexander Crawford Lamb (1843–1897), antiquary
- Anne Richelieu Lamb (1807–1878), feminist writer
- Helen Lamb (1956–2017), poet and fiction writer
- Norman Lamont (1869–1949), writer and politician
- Andrew Lang (1844–1912), poet, novelist and folk-tale collector
- Sir Thomas Dick Lauder (1784–1848), writer and antiquary
- Paul Laverty (b. 1953), screenwriter and lawyer
- John Parker Lawson (d. 1852), historian and Episcopal minister
- Ross Leckie (b. 1957), historical novelist
- Alexander Leighton (1587–1644 or 1649), pamphleteer and Presbyterian preacher
- Robert Leighton (1858–1934), journalist, editor, and writer of boys' fiction
- Patricia Leitch (1933–2015), children's writer
- Charlotte Lennox (c. 1730–1804), novelist (The Female Quixote), playwright and poet
- Tom Leonard (1944–2018), poet, novelist and essayist (in English and Glasgow patter)
- John Lesley (1527–1596), historian and Roman Catholic bishop
- Iain Levison (b. 1963), memoirist and crime novelist
- Eddie Linden (1935–2023), poet, magazine editor and political activist
- David Lindsay (1876–1945), science-fiction writer (A Voyage to Arcturus)
- Frederic Lindsay (1933–2013), crime writer
- Maurice Lindsay (1918–2009), poet, biographer and broadcaster
- Wallace Lindsay (1858–1937), classicist
- Robert Lindsay of Pitscottie (c. 1532–1580), chronicler (in Middle Scots)
- Eric Linklater (1899–1974), historian and novelist (Private Angelo)
- Liz Lochhead (b. 1947), playwright (Mary Queen of Scots Got Her Head Chopped Off), poet
- John Gibson Lockhart (1794–1854), biographer and editor
- John Logan (1748–1788), historian and poet
- Kirsty Logan (b. 1984), novelist and short-story writer
- Iain Lom (c. 1624 – c. 1710), poet (in Gaelic)
- John Longmuir (1803–1883), poet and minister of the Free Church of Scotland
- William Laughton Lorimer (1885–1967), scholar and Bible translator (in Scots)
- Nick Lowe (b. 1956), classicist
- Charles Lyell (1797–1875), geologist, writer (Principles of Geology)
- Michael Lynch (b. 1946), historian
- David Lyndsay or Lindsay (c. 1490 – c. 1555), poet (in Middle Scots) and courtier
- Henry Francis Lyte (1793–1847), Anglican divine, hymn-writer and poet

== M ==
=== Ma–Md ===
- Anne Macaulay (1924–1998), musicologist
- Thomas Babington Macaulay (1800–1859), essayist, historian, poet and politician
- Alexander Macbain (1855–1907), philologist
- Scott McBain (pseudonym, b. 1960), novelist
- George MacBeth (1932–1992), poet and novelist
- Stuart MacBride (b. 1969), crime writer
- Brian McCabe (b. 1951), poet and short-story writer
- Norman MacCaig (1910–1996), poet
- R. B. McCallum (1898–1973), historian and psephologist
- Hugh MacColl (1831–1909), novelist and mathematician
- Malcolm MacColl (1831–1907), writer and episcopal cleric
- Fionn MacColla (1906–1975), novelist
- James McCosh (1811–1894), philosopher
- Thomas M'Crie (1772–1835), historian and United Secession Church minister
- John Ramsay McCulloch (1789–1864), economist
- Val McDermid (b. 1955), crime writer
- Hugh MacDiarmid (or. Christopher Murray Grieve, 1892–1978), poet (in Lallans and English)
- Matthew McDiarmid (1914–1996), critic and poet
- Allan MacDonald (1859–1905), poet and Roman Catholic priest
- Ethel MacDonald (1909–1960), anarchist and publisher
- George MacDonald (1824–1905), poet and novelist
- Norman Macdougall (b. 20th century), historian and biographer
- Iain McDowall (b. 20th century), crime writer
- David McDuff (b. 1945), translator, critic and poet
- Alexander Robertson MacEwen (1851–1916), church historian and United Free Church of Scotland minister
- Ronald Campbell Macfie (1867–1931), poet, science writer and physician
- James Pittendrigh Macgillivray (1856–1938), poet (in Scots) and sculptor
- Elvis McGonagall (b. 1960), poet and stand-up comedian
- William McGonagall (1825–1902), poet and performer
- Joseph McGrath (born 1930), screenwriter and film director
- Alasdair Alpin MacGregor (1899–1970), writer, photographer and poet
- William McIlvanney (1936–2015), novelist and poet
- Helen Clark MacInnes (1907–1985), thriller writer
- J. T. McIntosh (1925–2008), journalist and science-fiction writer
- Pat McIntosh (b. 20th century), mystery and fantasy writer
- Duncan Ban MacIntyre (1724–1812), poet (in Gaelic)
- John William Mackail (1859–1945), classicist, poet and biographer
- Angus Mackay (1939–2016), historian
- James A. Mackay (1936–2007), biographer, philatelist and plagiarizer
- John Henry Mackay (1864–1933), novelist and anarchist
- John McKay (b. 1966) playwright and film director
- Reg McKay (1953–2009), crime writer and writer on crime
- Shena Mackay (b. 1944), novelist
- Charles McKean (1946–2013), architectural historian and professor of Scottish architectural history at the University of Dundee
- Gillian McKeith (b. 1959), You Are What You Eat
- Agnes Mure Mackenzie (1891–1955), novelist, critic and historian
- Alexander Mackenzie (1838–1898), historian
- Compton Mackenzie (1883–1972), fiction writer and biographer
- Donald Alexander Mackenzie (1873–1936), ethnographer and mythologist
- George Mackenzie ("Bluidy Mackenzie", 1636/38–1691), lord advocate and legal writer
- Henry Mackenzie (1745–1831), novelist and miscellanist
- William Mackay Mackenzie (1871–1952), historian and archaeologist
- Piers Mackesy (1924–2014), military historian
- Euan MacKie (1936–2020), archaeologist
- John Duncan Mackie (1887–1978), historian
- Donald MacKinnon (1839–1914), Celtic scholar
- James Mackintosh (1765–1832), philosopher, historian and judge
- John Mackintosh (1929–1978), politician
- Ewen MacLachlan (1775–1822), classicist and translator (into Gaelic)
- Ian Maclaren (Rev. Dr John Watson, 1850–1907), fiction writer and theologian
- Adam McLean (born 1948), writer on alchemy
- Alasdair Maclean (1926–1994), poet and non-fiction writer
- Alistair MacLean (1922–1987), thriller writer (HMS Ulysses)
- Fitzroy Maclean (1911–1996), army officer, autobiographer and historian (Eastern Approaches)
- James Noël MacKenzie MacLean (1928–1978), historian
- Sorley MacLean (1911–1996), poet (in Gaelic)
- Robert McLellan (1907–1985), playwright and poet (in Scots)
- Iain Finlay Macleod (b. 1973), playwright
- Joseph Macleod (1903–1984), poet and playwright
- Ken MacLeod (b. 1954), science-fiction writer
- Nicholas McLeod (fl. 1868–1889), writer on Japan
- Norman Macleod (1783–1862), writer (in Gaelic) and minister of the Church of Scotland
- Norman Macleod (1812–1872), writer (in Gaelic and English) and minister of the Church of Scotland
- James McLevy (1793/4–1873), detective and writer on crime
- William Miller Macmillan, leading scholar of liberal South African historiography that emerged in the 1920s and started diminishing in the 1970s
- Ron McMillan (b. 1958), travel writer, crime writer and photo-journalist
- Sarah Broom Macnaughtan (1864–1916), novelist and Red Cross volunteer
- Aonghas MacNeacail (b. 1942), poet (in Gaelic)
- Kevin MacNeil (b. 20th century), novelist, poet and playwright
- F. Marian McNeill (1885–1973), ethnographer and food writer
- Graham McNeill (born 1971), novelist and games writer
- Hector Macneill (1746–1818), poet and song-writer
- Robert Macnish (1802–1837), writer and physician
- Catherine MacPhail (b. 1947), children's writer
- Hector Macpherson (1851–1924), biographer and political writer
- James Macpherson (1736–1796), poet and feigned translator of the "Ossian" poems
- Sharon McPherson (b. 1965), writer and publisher
- David MacRitchie (1851–1925), folklorist
- Angus MacVicar (1908–2001), crime and science-fiction writer
- Candia McWilliam (b. 1955), novelist
- Wes Magee (1939–2021), poet and children's writer
- Richard Maitland (1496–1586), poet (in Middle Scots) and judge
- John Major (awa Mair, 1497–1550), philosopher (in Latin and English)
- Sir John Malcolm (1769–1833), historian, army officer and colonial official
- David Mallet (c. 1705–1765), playwright and poet
- Ann Marie Di Mambro (b. 1950), playwright and scriptwriter
- Peter Manson (b. 1969), poet
- Laura Marney (b. 20th century), novelist
- Bruce Marshall (1899–1987), fiction and non-fiction writer
- Theodore Martin (1816–1909), poet, biographer and translator
- Ernest Marwick (1915–1977), writer on Orkney folklore and history
- James David Marwick (1826–1908), historian and politician
- Allan Massie (1938–2026), novelist and journalist
- David Masson (1822–1907), critic and historian
- David I. Masson (1915–2007), science-fiction writer and librarian
- Rosaline Masson (1867–1949), novelist, biographer and history writer
- Graham Masterton (born 1946), horror writer
- Colin Matthew (1941–1999), editor and historian (Oxford Dictionary of National Biography)
- Gavin Maxwell (1914–1969), naturalist and travel writer (Ring of Bright Water)
- Herbert Maxwell (1845–1937), novelist, historian and politician
- Peter May (b. 1951), novelist and screenwriter

=== Me–Mz ===
- James Meek (b. 1962), novelist and journalist
- Andrew Norman Meldrum (1876–1934), chemist and historian
- Andrew Melville (1545–1622), classicist, theologian and university reformer
- Elizabeth Melville (c. 1578 – c. 1640), poet
- Denzil Meyrick (b. 1965), crime novelist
- James Mill (1773–1836), historian and economist
- John Millar (1735–1801), philosopher and historian
- Mark Millar (b. 1969), comic book writer
- Martin Millar (Martin Scott, b. 1960), fantasy novelist
- Hugh Miller (1802–1856), geologist
- Judith Miller (b. 1951), writer and broadcaster on antiques
- Karl Miller (1931–2014), critic and biographer
- Denise Mina (b. 1966), crime writer and playwright
- Alexander Ferrier Mitchell (1822–1899), church historian and Church of Scotland minister
- Naomi Mitchison (1897–1999), novelist and poet
- Rosalind Mitchison (1919–2002), social historian
- Steven Moffat (b. 1961), television writer and producer
- Charles Kenneth Scott Moncrieff (1889–1930), writer, translator of Proust's À la Recherche du temps perdu
- David Macbeth Moir (1798–1851), poet, essayist and physician
- David Binning Monro (1836–1905), classicist and polymath
- Alexander Montgomerie (c. 1550–1598), poet (in Middle Scots)
- James Montgomery (1771–1854), editor, hymn writer and poet
- John Moore (1729–1802), physician and novelist
- Edwin Morgan (1920–2010), poet (in Scots)
- David R. Morrison (1941–2012), poet and essayist
- Ewan Morrison, novelist and screenwriter
- Grant Morrison (b. 1960), comic book writer and playwright
- William Motherwell (1797–1835), poet and antiquary
- Edwin Muir (1887–1959), novelist and poet
- Willa Muir (awa Agnes Neill Scott, 1890–1970), novelist and translator
- William Muir (1819–1905), orientalist
- Helen and Morna Mulgray (b. 1939), crime writers
- Neil Munro (awa Hugh Foulis, 1863–1930), humorist, novelist and critic
- Neil Gordon Munro (1863–1942), anthropologist
- Robert Munro 1835–1920, archaeologist
- Rona Munro (b. 1959), playwright and screenwriter
- Charles Murray (1864–1941), poet
- James Mylne (1757–1839), moral philosopher
- Robert Mylne (c. 1643–1747), lampooner and antiquary

== N ==
- Tom Nairn (b. 1932), political writer and essayist
- Carolina Nairne (née Oliphant, 1766–1845), songwriter and collector
- Bill Napier (b. 1940), novelist and science writer
- James Napier (1810–1884), antiquary and chemist
- Macvey Napier (1776–1847), solicitor, legal scholar, and editor of the Encyclopædia Britannica
- Mark Napier (1798–1879), historian
- Adam Neale (18th century – 1832), army physician and non-fiction writer
- Charles Neaves (1800–1876), poet, critic and jurist
- Patrick Neill (1776–1851), naturalist and travel writer
- William Neill (1922–2010), poet (in Scots, Gaelic and English)
- Robin Neillands (1935–2006), travel and military writer
- Ian Niall (born John Kincaid McNeillie, 1916–2002), writer (including novelist)
- Hume Nisbet (1849–1923), artist and novelist
- John Niven (b. 1966), novelist and screenwriter

== O ==
- Robert Maxwell Ogilvie (1932–1981), classicist
- William Ogilvie of Pittensear (1736–1819), classicist and reformer
- William Henry Ogilvie (1869–1963), poet
- Maggie O'Farrell (b. 1972), novelist
- Andrew O'Hagan (b. 1968), novelist and essayist
- Laurence Oliphant (1829–1888), novelist, travel writer and mystic
- Margaret Oliphant (1828–1897), novelist, historian and travel writer
- Thomas Oliphant (1799–1873), writer and composer
- Neil Oliver (b. 1967), writer and television presenter
- Richard Oram (b. 20th century), historian (including biographer)
- James Orr (1844–1913), church historian and United Presbyterian Church minister
- John Oswald (c. 1760 – 1793), philosopher, poet and social critic
- Agnes Owens (1926–2014), fiction writer

== P ==
- Isabel Pagan (c. 1740–1821), poet of the Romantic Era
- Janet Paisley (1948–2018), screenwriter, short-story wrier, playwright and poet (in Scots and English)
- Mungo Park (1771–1806), explorer and travel writer
- Aileen Paterson (1934–2018), children's writer
- Alasdair Paterson, poet
- Don Paterson (b. 1963), poet
- Neil Paterson (1915–1995), novelist and screenwriter
- Hamilton Paul (1773–1854), church minister, editor, pamphleteer, poet, and humourist
- G. C. Peden (b. 1943), economic historian
- Stef Penney (b. 1969), novelist and filmmaker
- Alexander Petrie (1881–1979), classicist
- Andrew Picken (1788–1833), novelist
- Ricardo Pinto (b. 1961), fantasy writer
- Robert Pollok (c. 1798–1827), poet and minister of the United Secession Church
- Jane Porter (1776–1850), Scottish novelist and dramatist
- Richard Price (b. 1966), poet, novelist and translator
- Andrew Seth Pringle-Pattison (1856–1931), philosopher
- David Purves (1924–2015), poet and playwright

== Q ==
- John Quigley (b. 1925), novelist

== R ==
- Hugh C. Rae (also Jessica Stirling, Robert Crawford, 1935–2014), historical novelist
- Janet Milne Rae (1844–1933), novelist and missionary
- Robert Rait (1874–1936), historian
- Hannu Rajaniemi (b. 1978), fiction writer
- Allan Ramsay (1686–1758), poet and playwright
- Andrew Michael Ramsay (1686–1743), writer on politics and religion
- Caro Ramsay (b. 20th century), crime writer
- Edward Bannerman Ramsay (1793–1872), clergyman of the Scottish Episcopal Church; wrote Reminiscences of Scottish Life and Character
- William Mitchell Ramsay (1851–1939), archaeologist and biblical scholar
- Ian Rankin (b. 1960), crime writer (Inspector Rebus series)
- P. J. G. Ransom (1935–2019), transport writer
- Alastair Reid (b. 1926), poet, scholar and translator
- Thomas Reid (1710–1796), philosopher
- Robert Rendall (1898–1967), poet and amateur naturalist
- Alexander Henry Rhind (1833–1863), antiquarian and archaeologist
- William Richardson (1743–1814), classicist and critic
- Edith Anne Robertson (1883–1973), poet (in both English and Scots)
- James Robertson (b. 1958), novelist and poet
- Robin Robertson (b. 1955), poet
- William Robertson (1721–1793), historian and Church of Scotland minister
- Michael Scott Rohan (b. 1951), fantasy and science-fiction writer
- Dilys Rose (b. 1954), poet and novelist
- Alexander Ross (1699–1784), poet
- Alexander Ross (c. 1590–1654) controversialist and translator
- David R. Ross (1958–2010), history and travel writer
- W. D. Ross (1877–1971), philosopher
- William Roughead (1870–1952), writer on crime and lawyer
- John Row (1568–1646), historian and Church of Scotland minister
- J. K. Rowling (b. 1965), English-born writer (Harry Potter series)
- Archie Roy (1924–2012), science writer and novelist
- Brian Ruckley (b. 20th century), fantasy writer
- Thomas Ruddiman (1674–1757), classicist
- Charlotte Runcie (b. 1989), poet
- Christopher Rush (b. 1944), novelist and children's writer
- Craig Russell (b. 1956), novelist and short-story writer
- David Syme Russell (1916–2010), theologian and Baptist minister
- William Russell (1741–1793), miscellanist
- Samuel Rutherford (c. 1600–1661), Presbyterian pastor, theologian and writer, and one of the Scottish commissioners to the Westminster Assembly
- Margaret Ryan (1944–2019), children's writer

== S ==
- Suhayl Saadi (b. 1961), novelist and dramatist
- Janet Schaw (c. 1740–1800), travel writer
- Alexander Scott (c. 1520–c. 1583), poet
- Alexander Scott (1920–1989), poet
- Allan Scott (Allan Shiach, b. 1940), screenwriter
- Andrew Murray Scott (b. 1955), novelist
- Harriet Anne Scott (1819–1894), novelist
- Manda Scott (awa Kellen Stewart, b. 1962), crime writer and veterinary surgeon
- Michael Scott (1789–1835), novelist
- Tom Scott (1918–1995), poet and critic
- Walter Scott (1771–1832), novelist and poet
- Ann Scott-Moncrieff (1914–1943), poet and story writer
- Helen Sedgwick (b. 1978), novelist and physicist
- W. C. Sellar (1898–1951), humorist, 1066 and All That (with R. J. Yeatman)
- William Young Sellar (1825–1890), classicist
- Francis Sempill (c. 1616–1682), poet and wit
- Sir James Sempill (1566–1625 or 1626), wrote Protestant literature, diplomat
- Robert Sempill (c. 1530–1595), narrative poet (in Middle Scots)
- Robert Sempill the younger (c. 1595 – c. 1663), poet, early user of the Standard Habbie stanza
- James Seth (1860–1925), philosopher
- Alan Sharp (1934–2013), novelist and screenwriter
- William Sharp (also Fiona MacLeod, 1855–1905), poet and biographer
- Nan Shepherd (1893–1981), novelist and poet
- Sara Sheridan (b. 1968), novelist
- Robert Sibbald (1641–1722), historian and physician
- J David Simons (b. 1953), novelist
- W. Douglas Simpson (1896–1968), architecture and archaeology academic and writer
- Catherine Sinclair (1800–1864), novelist and children's writer
- George Sinclair (1787–1834), garden writer and horticulturalist
- John Sinclair (1754–1835), writer on finance and agriculture
- Burns Singer (1928–1964), poet and translator
- William Forbes Skene (1809–1892), historian and editor
- John Skinner (1721–1807), historian, songwriter and Episcopal minister
- William Henry Oliphant Smeaton (1856–1914), biographer and children's writer
- William Smellie (1740–1795), antiquary and encyclopaedist
- Samuel Smiles (1812–1904), writer and politician, Self-Help
- Adam Smith (1723–1790), political economist, The Wealth of Nations
- Alexander McCall Smith (b. 1948), crime writer
- Alexander Smith (1829–1867), poet and essayist
- Ali Smith (b. 1962), novelist
- George Adam Smith (1856–1942), theologian and scholar
- George Smith (1833–1919), historian and geographer, mainly working in India
- Iain Crichton Smith (1928–1998), poet and novelist (in Gaelic and English)
- James Smith of Jordanhill (1782–1867), man of letters
- Janet Adam Smith (1905–1999), literary journalist, and champion of Scottish literature
- Sydney Goodsir Smith (1915–1975), poet and novelist (in Scots, Lallans and English)
- Tobias Smollett (1721–1771), novelist and poet, The Adventures of Roderick Random
- Christopher Smout (b. 1933), Historiographer Royal
- William Ritchie Sorley (1855–1935), philosopher
- William Soutar (1898–1943), poet and diarist (in English, Scots and Lallans)
- Alexander Souter (1873–1949), Biblical scholar
- John Spalding (fl. 1650), annalist
- Muriel Spark (1918–2006), novelist (The Prime of Miss Jean Brodie)
- Alan Spence (b. 1947), poet, novelist and playwright
- Lewis Spence (1874–1955), ethnographer, occultist and poet
- John Spottiswoode (1565–1639), historian and archbishop
- William Gordon Stables (1840–1910), children's writer and naval surgeon
- Adam Stark (1784–1867), local historian
- John Gabriel Stedman (1744–1797), military writer and colonial soldier
- James Brunton Stephens (1835–1902), poet and novelist
- John Sterling (1806–1844), poet, essayist and fantasy writer
- Gerda Stevenson (b. 1956), dramatist and actress
- D. E. Stevenson (1892–1973), novelist
- Robert Louis Stevenson (1850–1894), novelist, poet and travel writer, Treasure Island
- Dugald Stewart (1753–1828), philosopher
- Ena Lamont Stewart (1912–2006), playwright
- John Stewart of Baldynneis (c. 1545 – c. 1605), poet and translator (in Middle Scots)
- William Stewart (c. 1478–1548), poet (in Scots)
- Norman Stone (1941–2019), historian
- Charlotte Carmichael Stopes (1840–1929), writer and women's rights activist
- Marie Stopes (1880–1958), scholar, playwright and women's rights activist
- Elizabeth Storie (1818–1898), biographer
- Zoë Strachan (born 1975), novelist and academic
- John Strang (1795–1863), travel writer, translator, writer about Glasgow
- John Struthers (1776–1853), poet and miscellanist
- Sheila Stuart (1892–1974), children's writer
- Luke Sutherland (b. 1971), novelist and musician
- Annie Shepherd Swan (also David Lyall and Mrs Burnet-Smith, 1859–1943), romantic novelist
- John Swinton (1829–1901), Scottish-American journalist, newspaper publisher and orator

== T ==
- Reay Tannahill (1929–2007), historian and novelist
- Robert Tannahill (1774–1810), poet
- Alasdair and Hettie Tayler (1870–1937 and 1869–1951), historians
- Rachel Annand Taylor (1876–1960), poet, biographer and critic
- Fiona Templeton (b. 1951), poet, playwright and director
- Emma Tennant (1937–2017), novelist and editor
- William Tennant (1784–1848), scholar, poet and playwright
- Josephine Tey (real name Elizabeth MacKintosh, awa Gordon Daviot, 1896–1952), mystery writer and playwright
- Eleanor Thom (b. 1979), novelist
- William Thom (1799–1848), poet (in Scots)
- Thomas the Rhymer (also known as Thomas Learmonth, c. 1220 – c. 1298), rhymester and prophet
- May Miles Thomas, (b. 1959), screenwriter
- D'Arcy Wentworth Thompson (1860–1948), polymath, On Growth and Form
- Derick Thomson (awa Ruaraidh MacThòmais, 1921–2012), poet (in Gaelic), critic and publisher
- James Thomson (1700–1748), poet, The Seasons
- James Thomson (B.V.) (1834–1882), poet
- Thomas Thomson (1768–1852), advocate, antiquarian and archivist
- William Thomson, 1st Baron Kelvin (1824–1907), Treatise on Natural Philosophy (with Peter Guthrie Tate)
- Alice Thompson (living), novelist
- D. R. Thorpe (b. 1943), biographer
- Margaret Todd (c. 1859–1918), novelist, biographer and doctor
- Ruthven Todd (1914–1978), poet, novelist and children's writer
- Jeff Torrington (1935–2008), novelist
- Thomas Toughill (living), non-fiction writer
- Joseph Train (1779–1852), antiquarian and poet
- Nigel Tranter (1909–2000), historical novelist and historian
- Alexander Trocchi (1925–1984), novelist and cultural activist
- William Barclay Turnbull (1811–1863), antiquary
- Alexander Fraser Tytler (1747–1813), lawyer and writer
- Patrick Fraser Tytler (1791–1849), historian and biographer

== U ==
- Joan Ure (Elizabeth Thoms Clark) (1918–1978), poet and playwright
- Sir Thomas Urquhart (1611–1660), writer and translator

== V ==
- John Veitch (1829–1894), poet, philosopher and historian

== W ==
- Frank Arneil Walker (b. 1938), architectural academic and writer
- Danny Wallace (b. 1976), comic writer and performer
- Elizabeth, Lady Wardlaw (1677–1727), balladeer (in Middle Scots)
- Alan Warner (b. 1964), novelist
- Alan Watson (b. 1933), legal scholar
- D. E. R. Watt (1926–2004), historian
- William Montgomery Watt (1909–2006), historian and biographer, Muhammad at Mecca
- William J. Watson (1865–1948), toponymist
- William Watson (1931–2005), novelist and playwright
- David Wedderburn (c. 1580–1646), writer, and schoolmaster at Aberdeen Grammar School
- James Wedderburn (c. 1495–1553), poet and playwright
- John Wedderburn (c. 1505–1553), poet and theologian
- Robert Wedderburn (c. 1510 – c. 1555), poet and vicar
- Molly Weir (1910–2004), memoirist and actress
- Tom Weir (1914–2006), naturalist and broadcaster
- Irvine Welsh (b. 1961), novelist, Trainspotting
- Louise Welsh (b. 1965), thriller writer
- Mortimer Wheeler (1890–1976), archaeologist
- Kenneth White (b. 1936), poet and academic
- Brian Whittingham (b. 1950), poet and playwright
- Christopher Whyte (b. 1952), novelist, poet and translator (English and Gaelic)
- Jack Whyte (b. 1940), historical novelist and fantasy writer
- George Whyte-Melville (1821–1878), novelist and poet
- William the Clerk (possibly William Malveisin, d. 1238), poet (in Old French), Roman de Fergus
- Peter Williamson (1730–1799), known as "Indian Peter", memoirist and showman
- Robert Willis (1799–1878), translator and writer on medicine and philosophy
- John Wilson (awa Christopher North, 1785–1854), writer and critic
- Rab Wilson (b. 1960), poet, who writes mainly in Scots
- David Wingate (1828–1892), poet and collier
- Ninian Winzet (1518–1592), Roman Catholic priest and polemicist
- Robert Wodrow (1679–1734), historian
- David Wolstencroft (b. 1969), screenwriter and novelist
- Harry Harvey Wood (1903–1977), literary and artistic figure, a founder of the Edinburgh International Festival
- John Philip Wood (d. 1838), antiquary and biographer
- Jenny Wormald (1942–2015), historian

== Y ==
- Curtis Yorke (pen name of Susan Rowley Richmond Lee; 1854–1930), novelist
- Andrew Young (1885–1971), poet and Presbyterian minister, later Church of England cleric
- Douglas Young (1913–1973), poet, scholar and translator
- Sir Henry Yule (1820–1889), orientalist, writer of travel books, compiler of the Hobson-Jobson dictionary of the Indian English language

== See also ==
- List of Scottish dramatists
- List of Scottish novelists
- List of Scottish poets
- List of Scottish science fiction writers
- List of Scottish short story writers
- Lists of writers
- Scottish literature
- Writers' Museum
