= List of Scottish science fiction writers =

This is an alphabetical list of science fiction writers connected to Scotland by birth, death or long-term residence.

== A ==
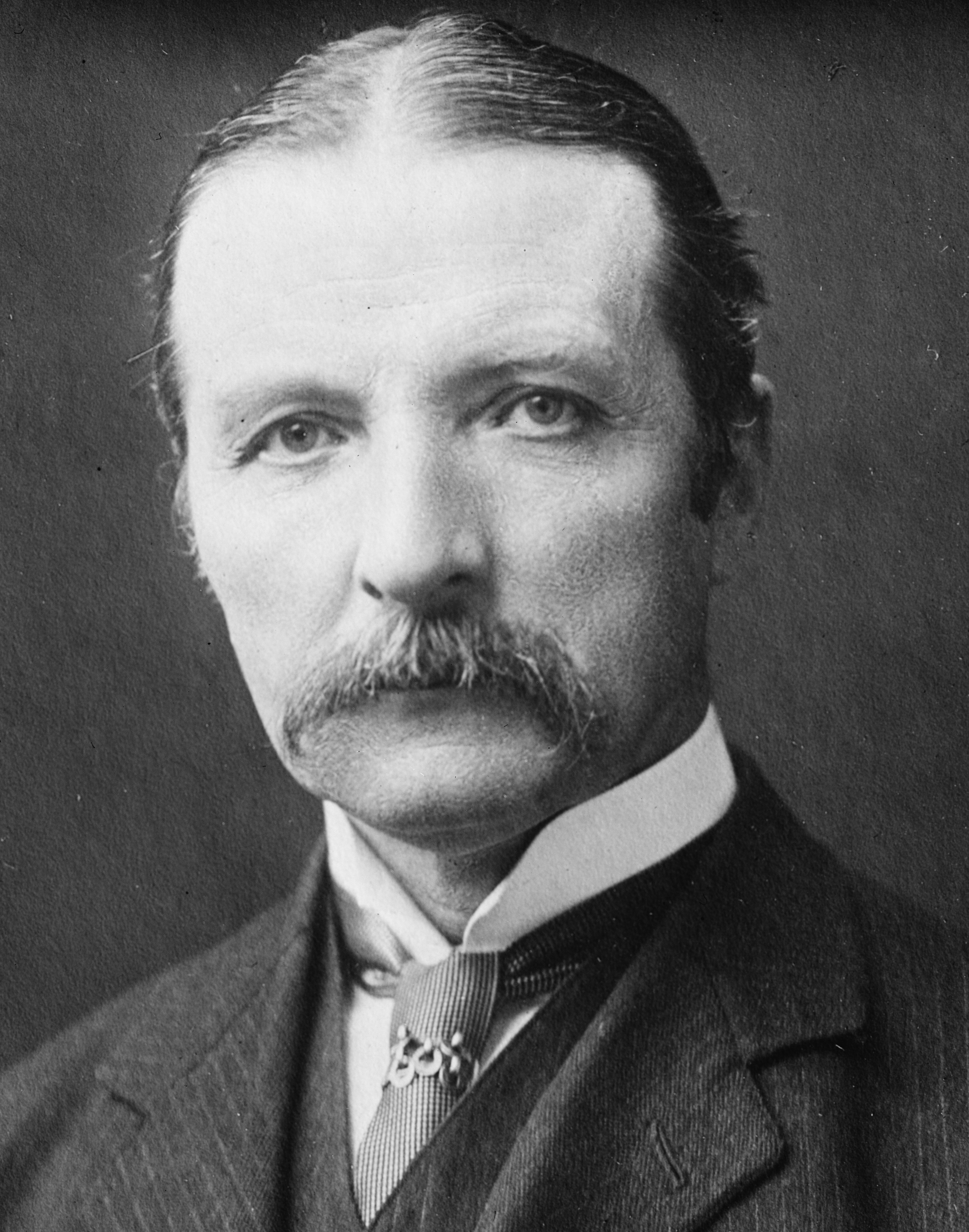
William Archer

- Gilbert Adair
- Mea Allan
- William Archer
- Marion Arnott
- Kate Atkinson
- William Auld

== B ==
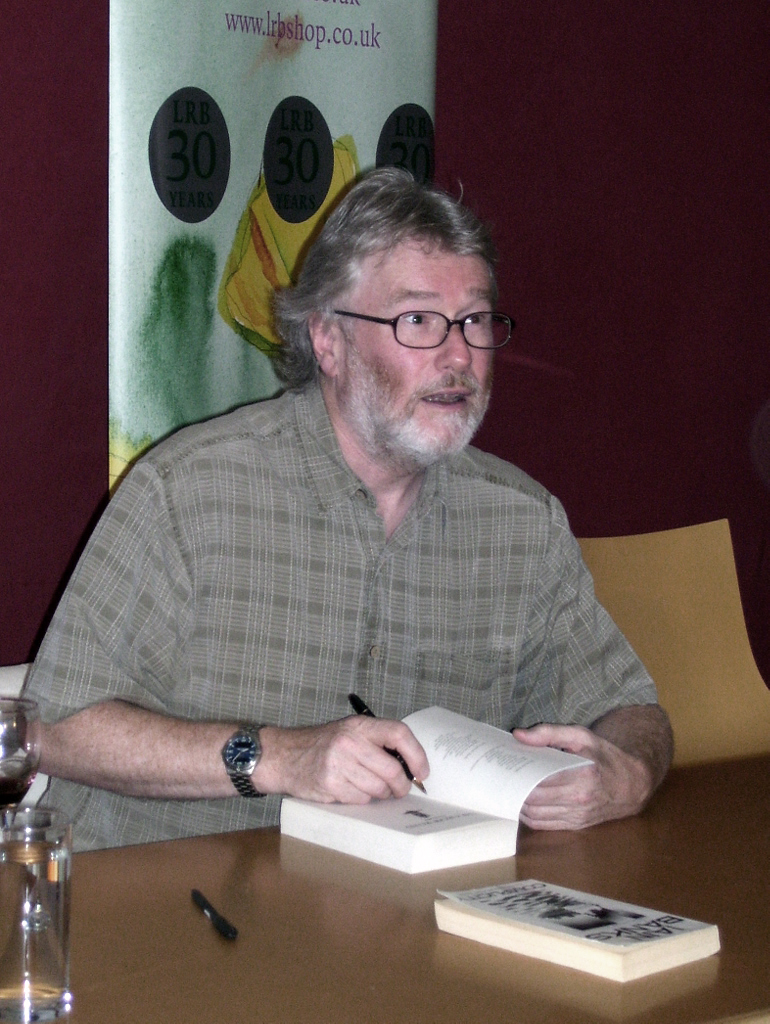
Iain Banks

- Allan Baillie
- David Baillie
- Andrew Balfour
- Iain Banks
- Robert Barr
- Eric Temple Bell
- Margot Bennett
- Julie Bertagna
- Chris Boyce
- Christopher Brookmyre
- George MacKay Brown
- John Brunner
- Jonathan Burke
- Ron Butlin

== C ==
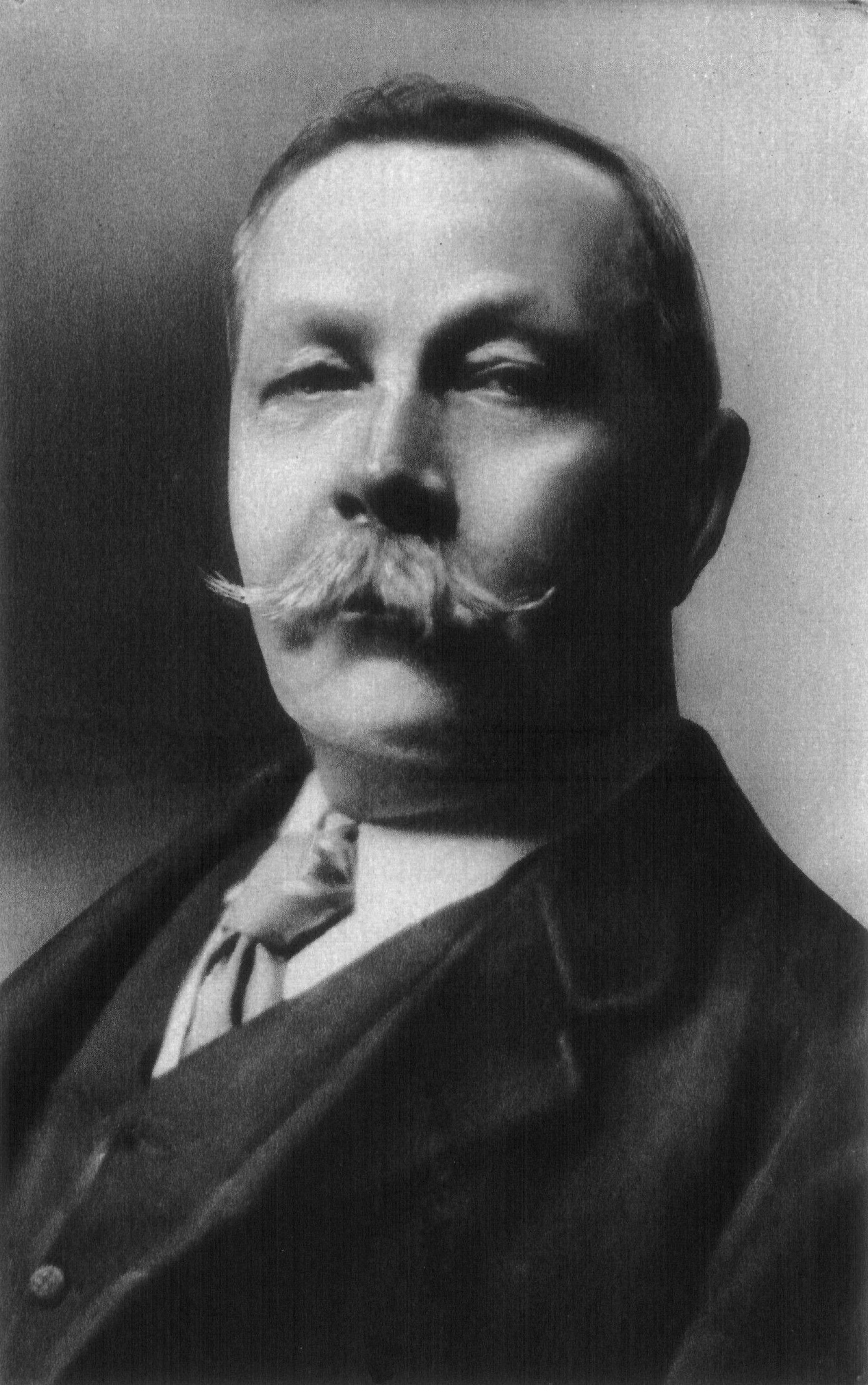
Arthur Conan Doyle

- J Storer Clouston
- Michael Cobley
- Arthur Conan Doyle
- JJ Connington

== D ==
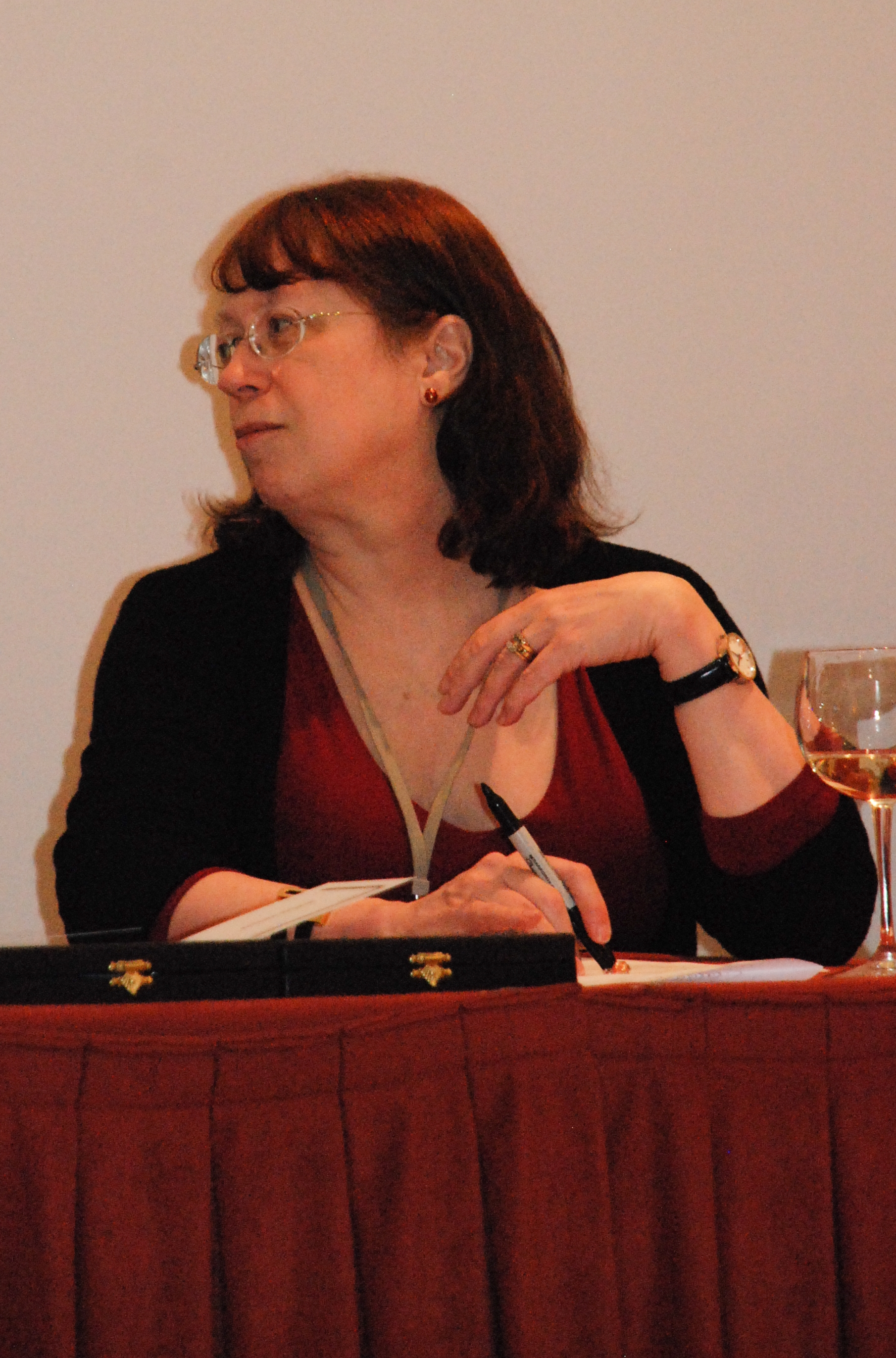
Diane Duane

- Florence Dixie
- Dougal Dixon
- Diane Duane – resident in Scotland for a period
- Robert Ellis Dudgeon
- Dave Duncan
- Hal Duncan

== E ==
- Margaret Elphinstone

== F ==
- Michel Faber – Dutch writer resident in Scotland; has used Scotland as a setting
- Matthew Fitt

== G ==
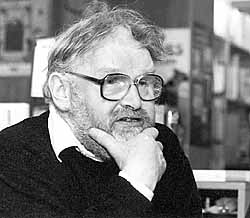
Alasdair Gray

- Jonathan Gathorne-Hardy
- Lewis Grassic Gibbon
- Gary Gibson
- Richard Gordon
- Stuart Gordon
- Alan Grant
- John Grant
- Alasdair Gray
- Stephen Greenhorn
- Neil M Gunn
- Kenneth Sylvan Guthrie

== H ==
- JBS Haldane
- Owen Hall
- Peter Hamilton
- Ronald Hingley

== J ==
- William James
- Richard Jobson

== K ==
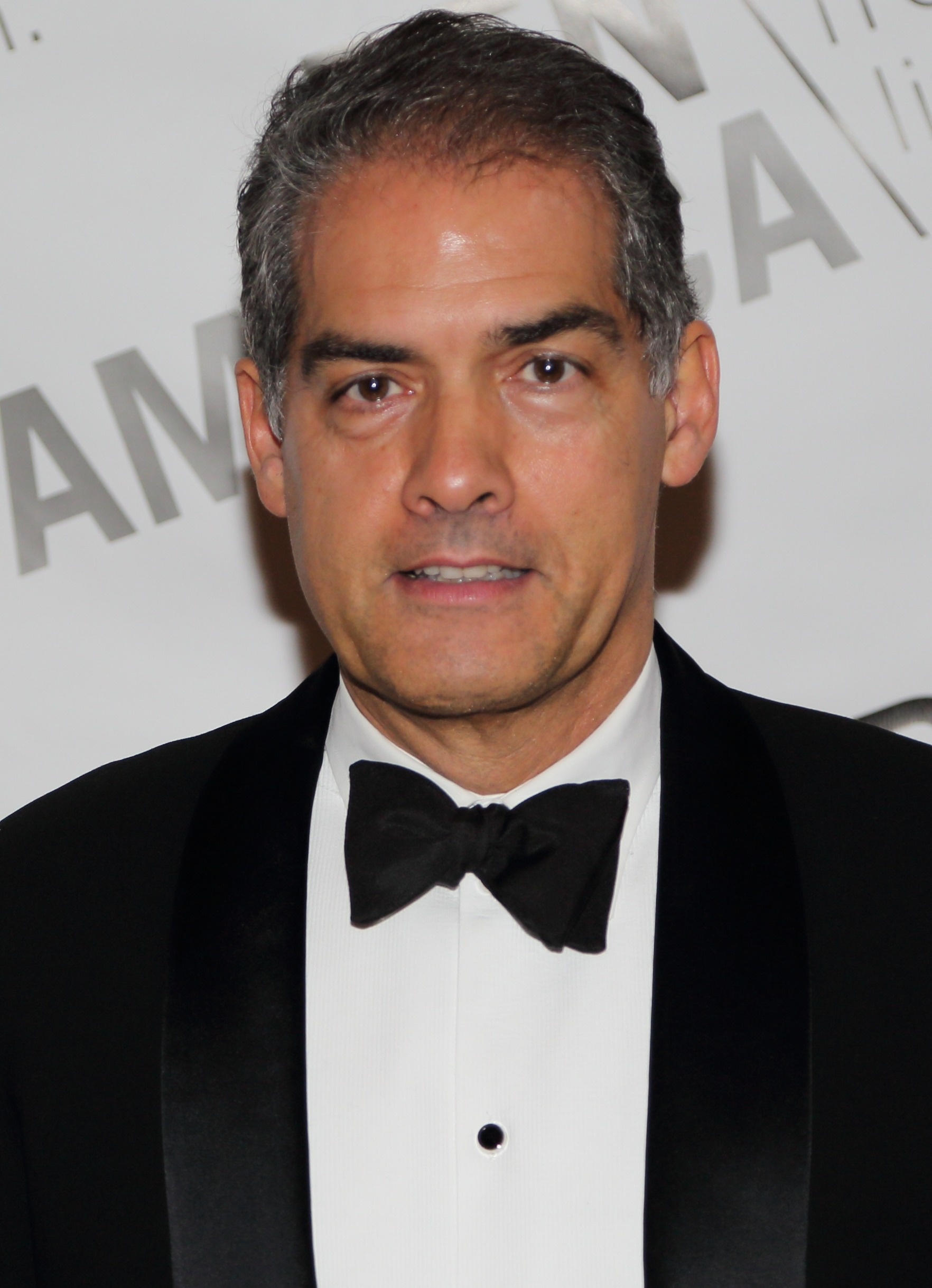
Phillip Kerr

- Chris Kelso
- James Kennaway
- Cam Kennedy
- Philip Kerr
- William King

== L ==
- Archibald Lamont
- Alan W. Lear
- David Lindsay
- Eric Linklater
- Duncan Lunan

== M ==
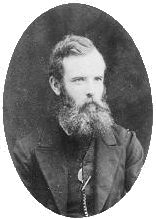
Hugh MacColl

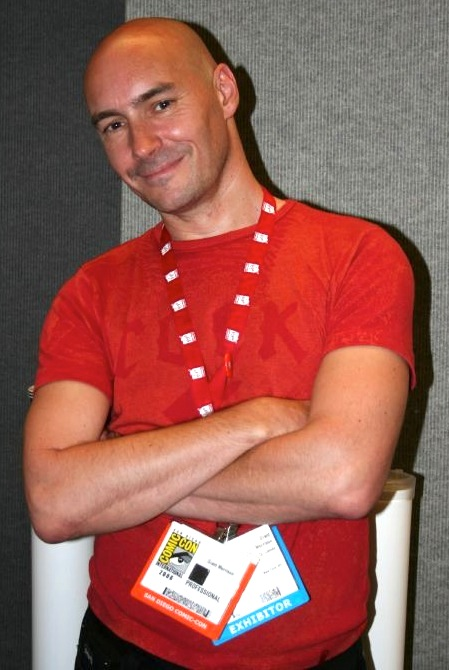
Grant Morrison

- Stuart MacBride
- Hugh MacColl
- J. T. McIntosh (James Murdoch MacGregor)
- F. Gwynplaine MacIntyre
- Compton Mackenzie
- Alistair MacLean
- Ken MacLeod
- Graham McNeill
- Angus MacVicar
- Donald Malcolm
- Colin Manlove
- Bruce Marshall
- Troy Kennedy Martin
- David I. Masson
- Robert Duncan Milne
- William Minto
- Naomi Mitchison
- Steven Moffat
- Dan Morgan
- Grant Morrison
- Peter Morwood – resident in Scotland for a while

== N ==
- Bill Napier
- Ian Niall (John McNeillie)
- Joseph Shield Nicholson
- Hume Nisbet
- Lisanne Norman

== O ==
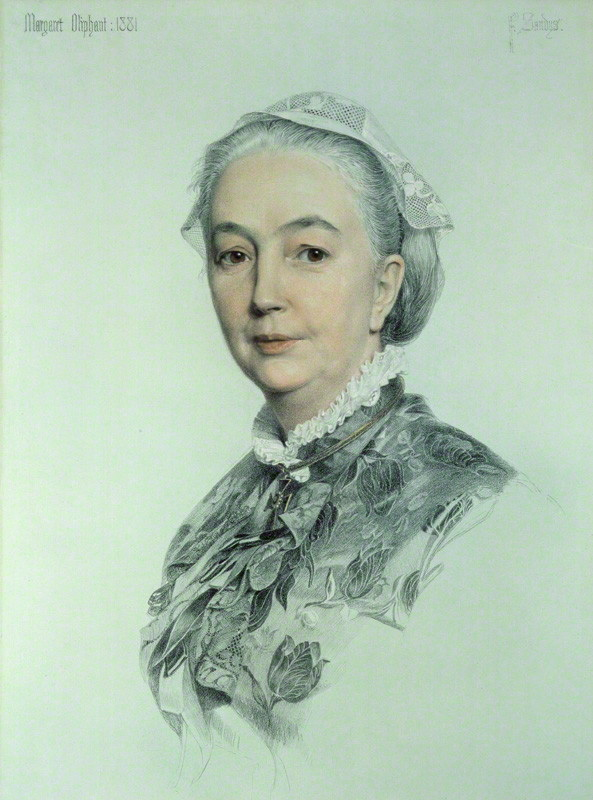
Margaret Oliphant

- Margaret Oliphant
- George Orwell – English writer of Scottish extraction; wrote Nineteen Eighty-Four while living in Isle of Jura
- Walter Owen

== P ==
- James Peddie
- David Pringle

== Q ==
- Frank Quitely

== R ==
- Hannu Rajaniemi – Finnish writer; long-term resident in Scotland
- Gordon Rennie
- Terence Roberts (Ivan T. Sanderson)
- Michael Scott Rohan
- Archie Roy
- Brian Ruckley

== S ==
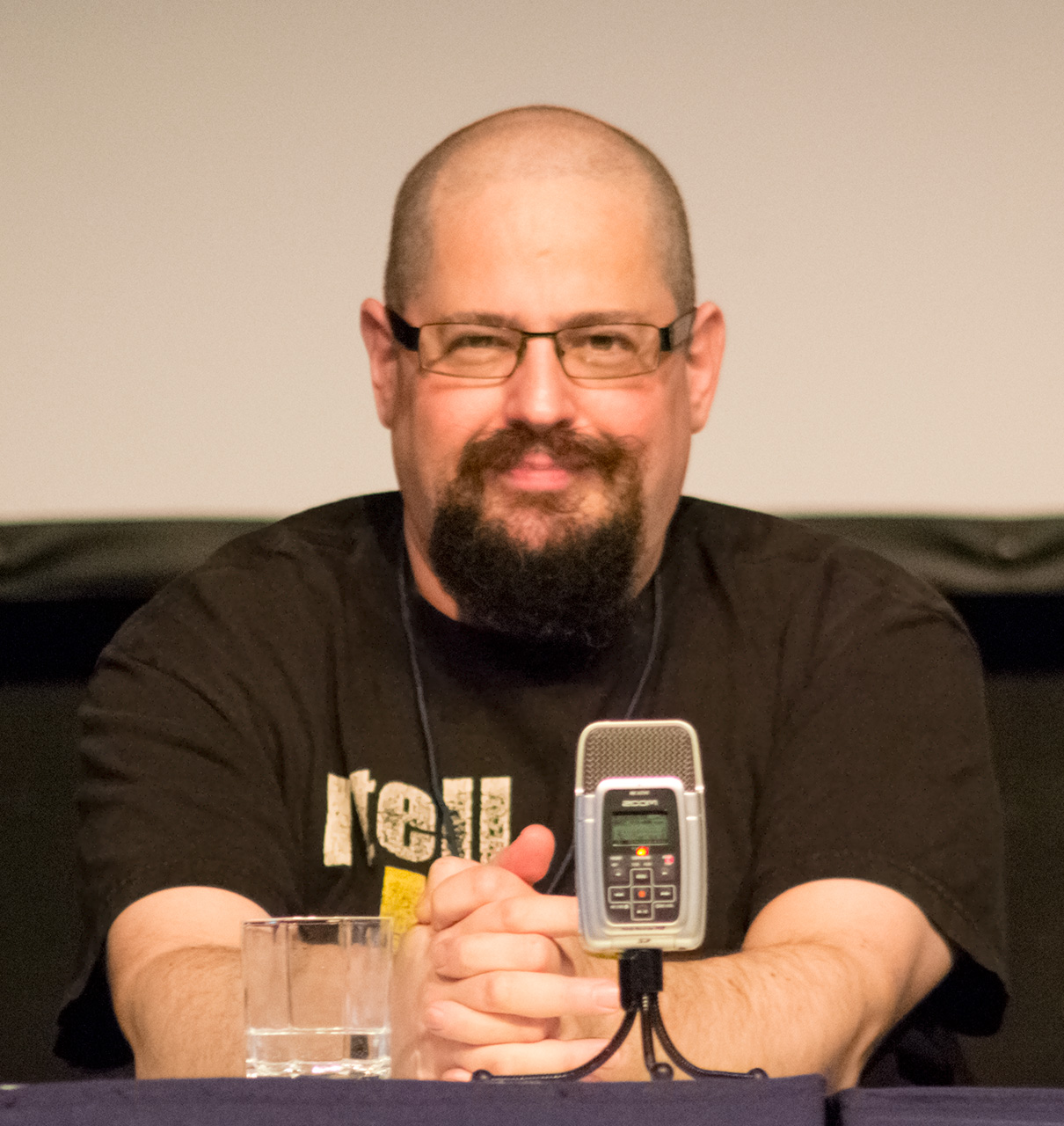
Charles Stross

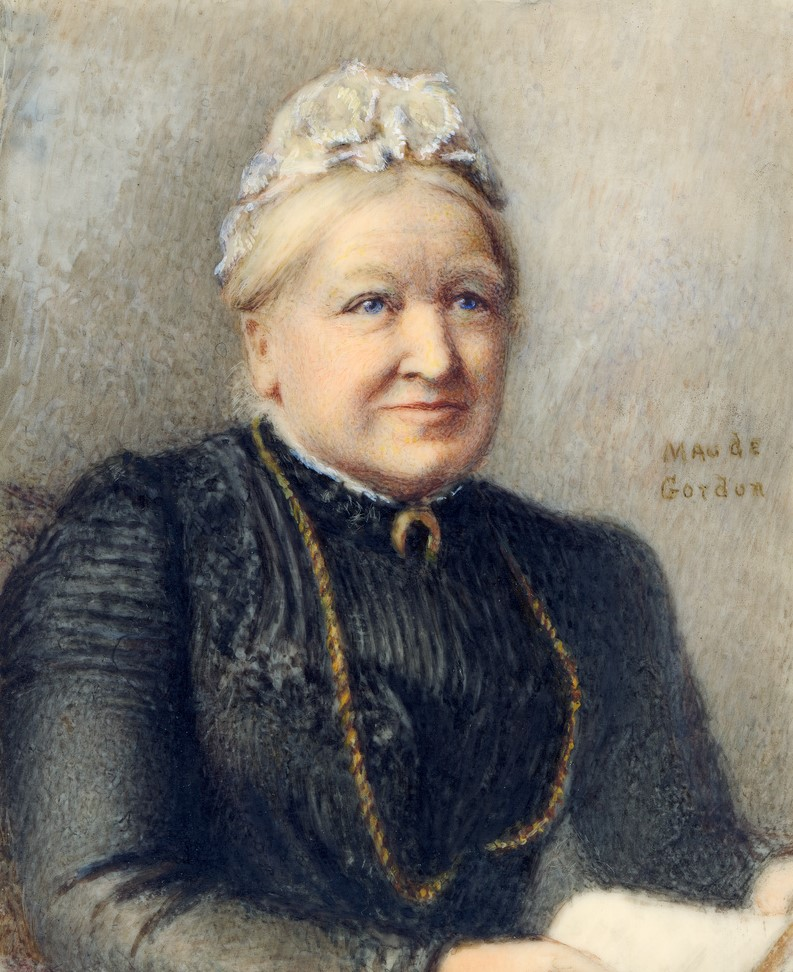
Catherine Spence

- Ivan T. Sanderson (Terence Roberts)
- Graham Seton
- Michael Shea
- Catherine Helen Spence
- Gordon Stables
- Robert Louis Stevenson
- Charles Stross
- Martin Swayne

== T ==
- John Taine (Eric Temple Bell)
- Ismar Thiusen (John MacNie)
- Ruthven Todd

== U ==
- Thomas Urquhart

== W ==
- David Walker
- Irvine Welsh
- Gordon Williams

== Y ==
- Jane Yolen – American writer; long-term resident of Scotland

== See also ==
- List of science fiction writers
- List of Scottish writers
