= List of Scottish short story writers =

This is an alphabetical list of short story writers from Scotland.

== A–M ==
- William Black
- John Burke
- John Burnside
- A. J. Cronin
- Carol Anne Davis
- Arthur Conan Doyle
- Bill Drummond
- Alastair Dunnett
- Ian Hamilton Finlay
- Matthew Fitt
- Alasdair Gray
- Neil Gunn
- Tom Hanlin
- Laura Hird
- James Hogg
- Jules Horne
- James Kelman
- A. L. Kennedy
- Eric Linklater
- George MacDonald
- Bernard MacLaverty
- Alistair MacLean
- Brian McCabe
- Alexander McCall Smith
- Sharon McPherson
- Candia McWilliam
- Metaphrog
- Neil Munro

== N–Z ==
- Agnes Owens
- Neil Paterson
- Dilys Rose
- Brian Ruckley
- Ali Smith
- Iain Crichton Smith
- Muriel Spark
- Robert Louis Stevenson
- Annie Shepherd Swan
- Ruth Thomas
- Violet Tweedale
- Fred Urquhart
- Irvine Welsh

== See also ==
- Scottish literature
- List of Scottish writers
- List of short story writers
