= Walter Sholto Douglas =

Scottish writer, born Mary Dods (1790–1830)

- Born: Mary Diana Dods; 1790
- Died: 1830 (aged 39–40)
- Citizenship: Scottish
- Occupations: Writer, diplomat, scholar
- Spouse: Isabella Robinson
- Children: Adeline Douglas
- Writing career
- Pen name: David Lyndsay
- Notable works: Dramas of the Ancient World, Tales of the Wild and the Wonderful

Walter Sholto Douglas (1790–1830), born under the name Mary Diana Dods, was a Scottish writer of books, stories and other works. Despite being assigned a female identity, Douglas lived as a man in his private, public, and work life. Most of his works appeared under the pseudonym David Lyndsay. His name may have been partly inspired by his grandfather's name, Sholto Douglas, 15th Earl of Morton. He was a close friend and confidant of Mary Shelley, and the husband of Isabella Robinson. In 1980, scholar Betty T. Bennett began research that would result in sensationally outing Douglas, connecting his deadname with his writing pseudonym, making the false assertion of Walter being a mentally ill abusive cis woman seizing opportunities otherwise unavailable to him by presenting as a man.

== Early life ==
Apparently illegitimate children of George Douglas, the 16th Earl of Morton, Douglas and his older sister Georgiana were raised at two residences – Dalmahoy House, the seat of his father's Scottish estate, and another in London.

== Education ==
The success of works published under his pseudonym of David Lyndsay suggests that Douglas had received a substantial education. Education for women was better in Scotland than in England in the 19th century, but still paltry. At most, women learned basic etiquette and household upkeep from hired governesses. Douglas' education is attributed to the Scottish parish-school system. Unlike Edinburgh University, parish schools educated both sexes. Another theory is that his father was wealthy enough to provide additional domestic tutors. Another supporting detail in Bennett's research is a letter from Lyndsay to his publisher claiming an education under the "best Masters".

== Work ==
Some dramas of Lyndsay's appeared in Blackwood's Magazine, as did several of his stories, which have been seen as "very much in the vein of Byron's Oriental tales". Douglas, communicating as Lyndsay, admitted to admiring Byron for his writing, but adamantly denied that he plagiarized his work.

Lyndsay made at least six contributions to Blackwood's Magazine. Those confirmed include "The Death of Isaiah – a Fragment", "Horae Gallicae. No. I. Raynouard's States of Blois", "The Mount of Olives, The Plague of Darkness, The Last Plague", "The Ring and the Stream" and "Vigil of St. Mark". Another key work was Dramas of the Ancient World, written at William Blackwood's invitation, which appeared in 1822 as written by David Lyndsay. Tales of the Wild and the Wonderful (1825) was published anonymously, with support from his close friend Mary Shelley. This contributed to the then-current popularization of German fairy-tales.

Douglas, as David Lyndsay, rose in his lifetime to the higher literary circles of England and of France. He seems to have been acquainted with General Lafayette, Lord Byron and Frances Wright. He explained his use of a pseudonym to his father in a letter of 26 June 1822: "I sometimes, about once a quarter, write a criticism for the Reviewers upon some popular work, any that happen to be the fashion, for which, I am esteem'd one of the cleverest and keenest of that race of Vipers. I am paid tolerably well, ten Guineas per sheet, but this not under my own name. I dare not acknowledge the Fact lest the angry Authors whose works I am compelled to maul in the course of my vocation should return the compliment and maul me in return."

Writing as a male author in the early 19th century gave Douglas invaluable freedom. As a young man, his wealthy father had often ignored his petitions for money – his sister Georgiana was typically given a larger sum and more often. This shows that Douglas' father did not trust his financial responsibility in the same way as his sister's, a limitation that kept both young children in perpetual debt. The debt receipts and bills, however, provide much evidence for the research on Douglas in relation to his personae – Lyndsay and Dods. Writing as Lyndsay, Douglas developed his literary ingenuity and avoided the constraints of working in the more socially acceptable role of a governess. Through his writing, he began to reach into the literary circles of Lord Byron and Mary Shelley. The letters of Mary Shelley, the original focus of Bennett's research, reveal details of the identities Douglas adopted in his life and career.

== Identity ==
Douglas' writing pseudonym was David Lyndsay, for the purpose of supporting himself as a writer while living with his sister Georgiana Carter. Carter's husband died soon after their marriage, and the brother and sister lived together in London. In August 1821, the first of many letters appeared between Lyndsay and the publisher of Blackwood's Magazine, William Blackwood. As Lyndsay, Douglas received criticism and praise for his published work in the magazine. Lyndsay was recognized as a quality, well-read writer by the magazine's critics. In 1822, letters began to make mention of a liver disease that occupied Lyndsay and prevented his work from being completed on time.

These correspondences reveal some biographical detail. Douglas, writing as Lyndsay, relates details such as his Scottish heritage, his linguistic prowess, and his skill in theatre critique. The connection between Douglas and Lyndsay is clear: Douglas was noted as linguistically gifted in his social spheres, and fluent in French, German, Italian, Latin, and Spanish. Other small details support the relationship; both Douglas and Lyndsay in separate letters relate a difficult and demanding relationship with their father.

=== Second identity ===
Walter Sholto Douglas was an aspiring diplomat, scholar, husband to Isabella Robinson, and friend of Mary Shelley. Robinson was pregnant by another man, so her marriage to Douglas helped cover the pregnancy's illegitimacy. Furthermore, despite the apparent lack of biological relation, Douglas fully stepped up to a father role. Robinson and Douglas named their child Adeline Douglas. When Adeline Douglas married Henry Drummond Wolff in 1853, she cited her late father as "Walter Sholto Douglas," further confirming that he lived as a man in his personal life. Correspondence between Douglas and Jane Williams in the mid-1820s suggests they, too, had close relations.

In 1827 Shelley helped Douglas and Robinson obtain passports enabling them to travel to Paris under the correct names Mr. and Mrs. Douglas, despite the anti-LGBT political climate. The passport describes Douglas as short, with dark, curly hair and dark eyes. In a book by Eliza Rennie, biographer of Mary Shelley, Douglas is described similarly: "Very sharp and piercing black eyes, a complexion extremely pale and unhealthy... her [sic] figure was short... (Douglas' hair) cropped, curly, short, and thick." Rennie adds that visually, Douglas passed as "someone of the masculine gender".

These similarities support rather than prove the double identity. In another section of the Shelley book, Rennie writes, "'Miss Dods' was an alias for Mr. ---." This provides strong confirmation that Rennie knew the alternative identities of Douglas.

Letters between Mary Shelley and literary acquaintances intimate similar details about Douglas' identity. Because Shelley corresponded with both Lyndsay and Douglas, the obvious similarity in their handwriting confirms their identity as a single writer. One clue comes in a letter Shelley wrote with a large blank space originally indicating to critics that she had simply discontinued one sentence and begun another. However, the phrase is continuous and states, "pray console dear Doddy for [blank space] she is very sorrowful & has reason to be so." Reading the rest of Shelley and Lyndsay's letters in hindsight, and other letters to literary friends, Bennett affirms the proto-trans identity of both Douglas and Lyndsay.

=== Moustache and whiskers ===
Later in life Douglas suffered further attacks of liver disease and other unnamed mental and physical illnesses. The decline in Douglas' mental and physical wellbeing coincided with separation from Isabella for a substantial period. After a lifetime of financial struggle and debt, Douglas ended up in a debtor's prison. While there, he asked a friend to obtain for him a false moustache and whiskers, in keeping with the fashion of the time. Though a contemporary, Mary Elizabeth Clarke, speculated that Douglas was trying to impress the jailers, in truth it was likely an effort to conceal a lack of natural beard growth, and potentially to maintain a male self-image.

Douglas is thought to have died of his ailments between November 1829 and November 1830, after many months in prison.

== Legacy ==
Lady Adeline Douglas Wolff's secret stories of how her mother Isabella Robinson's first husband had switched genders might have appealed to her own daughter, the rebellious author Adeline Georgiana Isabel Kingscote, who published several of her first novels under the male pseudonym Lucas Cleve.

== See also ==
- List of pen names
- List of Scottish short story writers
- List of Scottish writers
- List of transgender people

== Bibliography ==
- Bennett, Betty T. (1994). Mary Diana Dods: A Gentleman and a Scholar (Johns Hopkins paperbacks ed.). Hopkins University Press. ISBN 978-0801849848. OCLC 634508279.
- Bennett, Betty T. (1991). Mary Diana Dods: A Gentleman and a Scholar (1st ed.). William Morrow & Co. Press. ISBN 978-0688087173. OCLC 22310692.
- Ewan, Elizabeth L.; Innes, Sue; Reynolds, Sian; Pipes, Rose (2007). Biographical Dictionary of Scottish Women. Edinburgh: Edinburgh University Press. ISBN 978-0748617135.
- "David Lyndsay".
- Oldstone-Moore, Christopher (October 2005). "The Beard Movement in Victorian Britain". Victorian Studies. 48 (1): 7–34. doi:10.2979/vic.2005.48.1.7. ISSN 0042-5222. S2CID 143774134.
- Sage, Lorna (1999). The Cambridge Guide to Women's Writing in English. Cambridge University Press. ISBN 978-0521668132. "David Lyndsay Dods"
