= James Peddie =

James Peddie may refer to:

- James Peddie (minister) (1758–1845), Scottish Presbyterian minister
- James Peddie (author), Scottish writer
- James Peddie, Baron Peddie (1905–1978), British businessman and politician
