= Laura Marney =

Scottish novelist and short-story writer (born 20th century)

Laura Marney (born 20th century) is a Scottish novelist and short-story writer.

== Biography ==
The author of five novels and numerous short stories, Marney is a member of the Glasgow G7 group of writers (Alan Bissett, Nick Brookes, Rodge Glass, Laura Marney, Alison Miller, Zoë Strachan and Louise Welsh).

Born and brought up in Glasgow, Marney co-founded a theatre group Theatre Raskolnikov there. Since "nobody else could be bothered", she also began writing scripts for the company.

Marney is a graduate of the MLitt course in creative writing at the University of Glasgow, and now teaches there.

Her writing has been described as black humour. She also writes for radio.

Marney tutored Leela Soma, one of the 21 writers and 21 artists commissioned by Glasgow Women's Library in 2012 to create work to celebrate the 21st birthday of the organisation.

=== Novels ===
- No Wonder I Take a Drink (2004)
- Nobody Loves a Ginger Baby (2005)
- Only Strange People Go to Church (2006)
- My Best Friend Has Issues (2008)
- For Faughie's Sake (2014)

== See also ==
- List of Scottish novelists
- List of Scottish short story writers
- List of University of Glasgow people
