= Leela Soma =

Indian-Scottish writer

- Born: Madras
- Died: December 2022
- Occupations: Writer, poet
- Works: Twice Born
- Website: http://www.leelasoma.com

Leela Soma was a Scottish-based writer who was born in Madras (former name for Chennai) in India, and lived in Glasgow.

== Biography ==
Leela Soma came to Glasgow in 1969 with her husband. She worked, until her retirement, as a teacher of Modern Studies. During this time she took up creative writing under the tutelage of Laura Marney. She followed this with Creative Writing Classes in the Department of Adult and Continuing Education at the University of Glasgow.

== Her work 2007 - 2016 ==
She wrote novels, poetry and short stories which have been published in a number of anthologies and publications, including The Scotsman, The Grind, New Voices, and Gutter magazine magazine. 'Twice Born' was published through Youwriteon an online publishing company.' Her second novel 'Bombay Baby' was published by Dahlia Publishing Limited in 2011. 'She was commissioned along with 20 other writers to write a story for Glasgow Women's Library anthology, 21 Revolutions, for its 21st birthday in 2013. Her story 'Boxed In' was inspired by three items from the collections "The Suffragette Movement" by Sylvia Pankhurst; 'Traitors to the Masculine Cause: the Men's Campaign for Women's Rights by Sylvia Strauss and a copy of 'The Woman Worker' of 1908. She was part of 'Butterfly Rammy,’ an Edinburgh Festival Fringe Show (2015) for which she was commissioned to write a short story. Her next work (2016) was a crime novel set in Glasgow's West End. She has served on the committee for the Milngavie Books and Arts Festivals, and also on the Scottish Writer's Centre Committee. Her work reflects her dual heritage of India and Scotland.

== Awards ==
She won the Margaret Thomson Davis Trophy at Strathkelvin Writer's Group for Best New Writer 2007 for her novel 'Twice Born'.

== Publications ==
- Twice Born published by You Write On 2007
- Bombay Baby published by Dahlia Publishing Limited 2011
- Boxed in published by The Pot Hole Press 2013
- Butterfly Rammy 2015

== Death ==
Leela died in December 2022 after a sudden brief illness.
