= Janet Paisley =

Scottish playwright, poet, screenwriter, short-story writer (1948–2018)

Janet Violet Paisley (12 January 1948 – 9 November 2018) was a Scottish playwright, poet, screenwriter, and short-story writer, writing in Scots and English. Her work has been translated into German, Russian, Lithuanian, Slovak, Spanish, Hungarian, Ukrainian, Italian and Polish.

== Career ==
Her first play, Refuge, won the Peggy Ramsay Award in 1996.

She was awarded a Creative Scotland Award to write Not for Glory (2000), a collection of interlinked short stories in Scots set in a small village in Central Scotland. Not for Glory was one of the ten Scottish finalists voted for by the public in the 2003 World Book Day 'We are what we read' poll.

The short film Long Haul, written by Paisley, received a British Academy of Film and Television Arts (BAFTA) nomination in 2001.

Paisley was a member of the Working Party for a Scottish National Theatre, the SAC Scots Language Synergy, and the Cross Party Parliamentary Group for the Scots Language. She held three Creative Writing Fellowships, received two Scottish Arts Council Writer's Bursaries and a Playwright's Bursary. Additionally, Paisley edited New Writing Scotland, an annual anthology of new short fiction and poetry, and co-ordinated the first Scottish PEN Women Writers Committee.

== Legacy ==
Paisley's literary archive is held at the National Library of Scotland.

== Personal life ==
Paisley was the mother of seven sons, including the actor David Paisley. One son died in early childhood.

=== Death ===
Janet Paisley died on 9 November 2018, at the age of 70.

==== Posthumous honours ====
On 1 December 2018, Paisley was posthumously awarded an MG Alba Trad Music Award for Services to the Scots Language, sponsored by Scots Radio. The award was subsequently renamed the Janet Paisley Services to Scots Award in her honour.

== See also ==
- List of female poets
- List of Scottish dramatists
- List of Scottish poets
- List of Scottish short story writers
