= Alastair Hamilton =

British historian (born 1941)

Professor Alastair Hamilton FBA
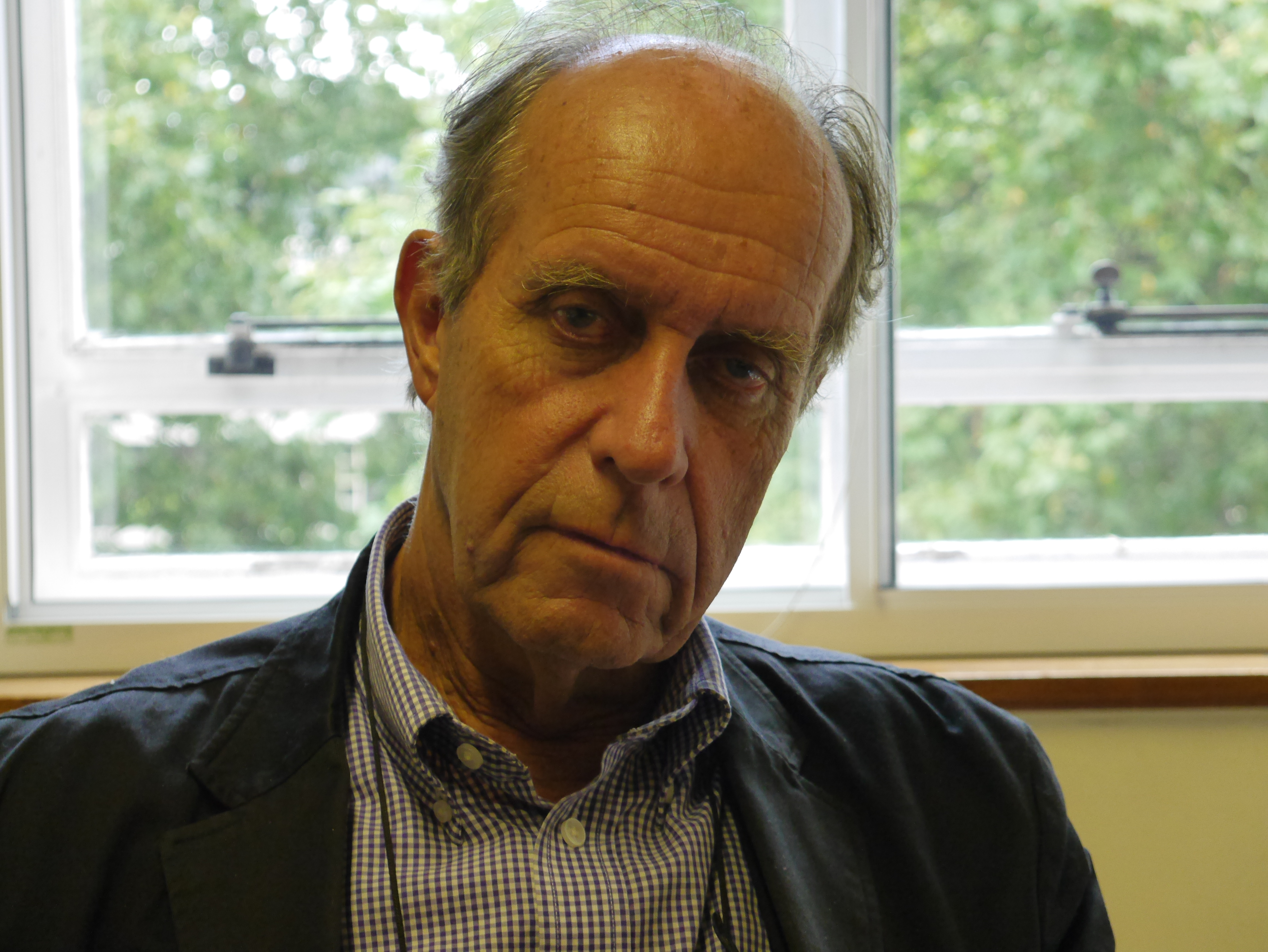
- Born: Alastair Andrew Hamish Hamilton; 20 May 1941 (age 85); London, England, United Kingdom
- Education: Eton College; King's College, Cambridge
- Occupation: Historian
- Writing career
- Subjects: History, Religion, Literature
- Website: warburg.sas.ac.uk/people/alastair-hamilton

Alastair Andrew Hamish Hamilton FBA (born 20 May 1941) is an English historian.

== Education ==
The only son of the publisher Hamish Hamilton and his second wife Yvonne Vicino Pallavicino, Hamilton was educated at Eton College and read Modern Languages at King's College, Cambridge, proceeding MA in 1967. He received his PhD in Divinity in 1982.

== Career ==
After working for the International Cultural Centre in Tunis and as a publisher and translator in New York City and Berlin, he was appointed to lecture in English literature at the University of Urbino in Italy in 1977. Having specialised in the study of the Radical Reformation and Western relations with the Arab world, he became the Dr C. Louise Thijssen-Schoute Professor of the History of Ideas at the University of Leiden in Holland in 1985, and in 1987 Professor of the History of the Radical Reformation (Anabaptistica) at the University of Amsterdam. In 2003 he was awarded an S.T. Lee Fellowship and in 2004 was appointed the Arcadian Visiting research professor at the School of Advanced Study, London University, attached to the Warburg Institute. In 2004 he was elected a corresponding fellow of the British Academy and has been a full fellow since 2013, when he settled in London. In 2016 he held the chair of Coptic studies at the American University in Cairo. In 2017 he was appointed a Senior Research Fellow at the Warburg Institute, and in 2022 he became an Honorary Fellow. In 2020 Hamilton, disappointed by Brexit and the Conservative Government, settled permanently in Italy. He obtained Italian citizenship in 2024. Hamilton is married to Cecilia Mucchi, the daughter of the radiologist Ludovico Mucchi from Milan and Costanza Piccolomini Clementini from Siena.

== Principal publications ==
- The Appeal of Fascism: A Study of Intellectuals and Fascism 1919–1945 (Anthony Blond, London, 1971)
- The Family of Love (James Clarke, Cambridge, 1981)
- William Bedwell the Arabist 1563-1632 (Brill, Leiden, 1985)
- Heresy and Mysticism in Sixteenth-Century Spain: The Alumbrados (James Clarke, Cambridge, 1992)
- Europe and the Arab World (The Arcadian Library, London and Oxford University Press 1994)
- The Apocryphal Apocalypse: The Reception of the Second Book of Esdras (4 Ezra) from the Renaissance to the Enlightenment (Oxford University Press, 1999)
- Arab Culture and Ottoman Magnificence in Antwerp's Golden Age (The Arcadian Library, London, and Oxford University Press, 2001)
- The Family of Love. I: Hendrik Niclaes. Bibliotheca Dissidentium. Répertoire des non-conformistes religieux des seizième et dix-septième siècles, vol. XXII, ed. André Séguenny (=Bibliotheca Bibliographica Aureliana CXCI), Éditions Valentin Koerner, Baden-Baden/Bouxwiller, 2003)
- (with Francis Richard), André Du Ryer and Oriental Studies in Seventeenth-Century France (The Arcadian Library, London, and Oxford University Press, 2004)
- The Copts and the West, 1439–1822: The European Discovery of the Egyptian Church. (Oxford University Press, 2006)
- An Arabian Utopia: The Western Discovery of Oman (The Arcadian Library, London, and Oxford University Press, 2010)
- The Arcadian Library: Western Appreciation of Arab and Islamic Civilization (The Arcadian Library, London, and Oxford University Press, 2011)
- The Family of Love. II: Hiël (Hendrik Jansen van Barrefelt). Addenda to The Family of Love. I. Hendrik Niclaes (= Bibliotheca Dissidentium vol.29 / Bibliotheca Bibliographica Aureliana vol.235.), Éditions Valentin Koerner, Baden-Baden/Bouxwiller (2013).
- Johann Michael Wansleben's Travels in the Levant 1671–1674. An Annotated Edition of His Italian Report (Brill: Leiden/Boston, 2018).
- Johann Michael Wansleben's Travels in Turkey, 1673-1676. An Annotated Edition of His French Report (Brill: Leiden/Boston, 2023), (with Maurits van den Boogert).
