= John Duignan =

Scottish economist and writer (1946–2019)

- Born: 6 January 1946; Barrhead, Scotland
- Died: 22 March 2019 (aged 73)
- Citizenship: United Kingdom
- Occupations: writer and academic
- Writing career
- Language: English

John Duignan (born 6 January 1946 – 22 March 2019) was a Scottish economist and writer.

Duignan was born in Barrhead, Scotland, in a family of eight children. He left school, St Mirin's Academy in Paisley, at age 15 and worked in a blacksmith's workshop, then served an engineering apprenticeship. He worked in both the engineering and construction industries before going to university, where he read Economics and Economic History.

Prior to becoming a full-time writer, Duignan lectured in economics, international business, and quantitative methods at the University of the West of Scotland, where he specialised in undergraduate work placement and had been Associate Lecturer at the Surrey European Management School, University of Surrey and visiting lecturer at French business schools and universities, including Montpellier, Toulon, Annecy and Le Havre. Duignan had presented papers at conferences in the UK, US, Sweden and Australia.

Duignan had one stage play produced (co-written with Ian Donald Cochrane Hopkins), and had work performed on TV and Radio, including Not the Nine O'Clock News and Naked Video.

His works of fiction include Skelp the Aged, co-written with Ian Donald Cochrane Hopkins, The Buick Stops Here, co-written with Ian Donald Cochrane Hopkins, The Lambshank Redemption, co-written with Ian Donald Cochrane Hopkins, and the Gerry Sweeney/Katherine Black trilogy Saving The Last Dance, Katherine Black Doesn't Dance and Things To Do When The Music Stops.

Hopkins and Duignan began writing Skelp the Aged as a play, before deciding to make it a novel. The three novels in the trilogy by Hopkins and Duignan follow hapless anti-heroes Mungo and Ethel Laird, in and out of trouble - and jail - as they struggle to maintain a living as a bookies.

His academic books include Quantitative Methods For Business Research Using Microsoft Excel in 2014 and A Dictionary of Business Research Methods in 2016.

Duignan died on 22 March 2019.
