= The Appeal of Fascism =

1971 book by Alastair Hamilton

The Appeal of Fascism: A Study of Intellectuals and Fascism 1919–1945
- Cover of the first edition
- Author: Alastair Hamilton
- Language: English
- Subject: Fascism
- Publisher: Blond
- Publication date: 1971
- Publication place: United Kingdom
- ISBN: 0-218-51426-3

The Appeal of Fascism: A Study of Intellectuals and Fascism 1919–1945 is a 1971 book by the historian Alastair Hamilton, in which the author examines poets, philosophers, artists, and writers with fascist sympathies and convictions in Italy, Germany, France, and England. Hamilton deals nation by nation with the response of intellectuals to Fascism, as well as events like the rise of Benito Mussolini's Italy, Nazi Germany, and the Second World War.

It was first published in London by Blond in 1971, then by Macmillan, in New York City, followed by a Discus Printing (Publisher: Avon).

== Reception ==
In 2002, H.L. Wesseling wrote that The Appeal of Fascism "is indeed an extensive but rather disappointing study because it is in fact more of an inventory of fascist writers than an analysis of their work or of the problem of writers and fascism."

However, in A Companion to Europe, 1900-1945, Gordon Martel said that The Appeal of Fascism is, "despite its age, the most satisfactory overview of fascism's attraction for intellectuals."
