= Thomas Toughill =

Thomas Toughill is a non-fiction author. Before becoming an author, Toughill had a varied career after graduating from the University of Glasgow in history and German. He worked in a whisky distillery, spent time as an infantry officer in the British Army, became an intelligence officer based in Hong Kong and was a bodyguard for both Henry Kissinger and Richard Nixon.
