= Patrick Anderson (physician) =

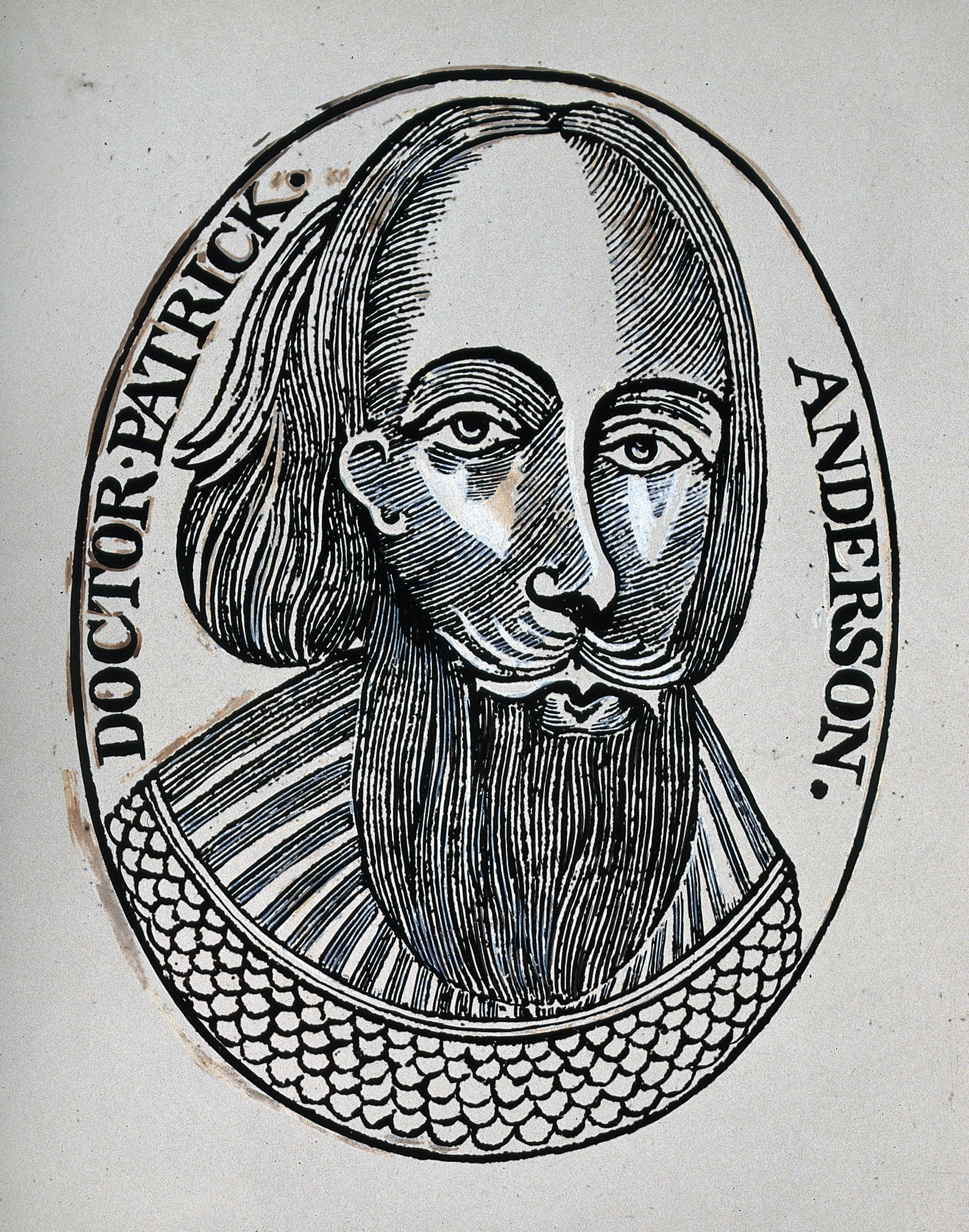
Patrick Anderson

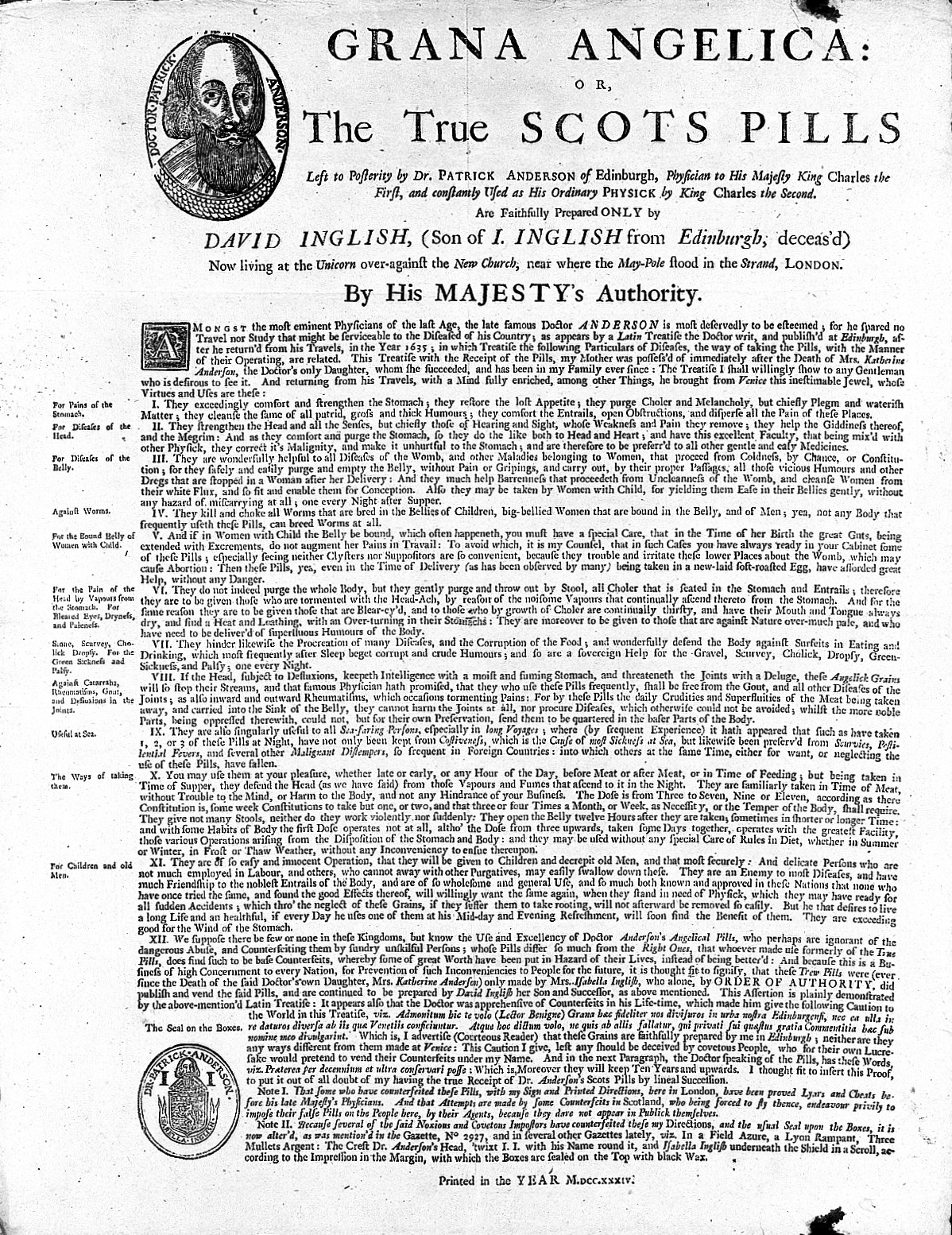
Broadsheet, text advertising 'Grana Angelica'

Patrick Anderson (fl. 9 May 1618 – 1 January 1635), was a physician and author.

Anderson was the author of 'The Colde Spring of Kinghorne Craig, his admirable and new tried properties so far foorth as yet are found true by experience' (1618), dedicated to John, earl of Mar; and a very rare book called 'Grana Angelica; hoc est, Pilularum hujus nominis insignis utilitas, quibus etiam accesserunt alia quædam paucula de durioris Alvi incommodis propter materiæ cognitionem, ac vice supplementi in fine adjuncta,’ Edinburgh, 12mo, 1635. The latter describes some mild aperient pills, the prescription for which Anderson says that he brought from Venice, which continued in 1843 to be sold in Edinburgh by the proprietor of an ancient patent.

In 1625 Anderson saw through the press a religious work, called 'The Countesse of Marres Arcadia,’ written by James Caldwoode, minister of Falkirk, and to it he prefixed a long dedicatory epistle addressed to the Countess of Mar, one of his patients. He wrote a history of Scotland in three folio volumes, preserved in manuscript in the Advocates' Library. After his death Anderson's friends published a satirical dramatic poem by him, entitled 'The Copie of a Baron's Court, newly translated by Whats-you-call-him, clerk to the same. Printed at Helicon beside Parnassus, and are to be sold in Caledonia.' This piece was reprinted in a limited edition in 1821, and to it an account of the author was prefixed. In several of his works Anderson is described as physician to Charles I.
