= Ron McMillan =

Scottish photographer and writer (born 1958)

- Born: April 29, 1958 (age 68); Paisley, Scotland
- Occupations: Novelist, travel author, photojournalist, writer for film and television

Ron McMillan (born 29 April 1958) is a Scottish freelance photojournalist and author best known for his rare photo coverage of North Korea and for authoring one of the few crime/suspense novels taking place in modern-day South Korea.

== Photojournalist ==
McMillan began his freelance journalist career in Seoul, Korea during the run up to the 1988 Olympic Games. For two years he reported on the street riots and political uncertainty that preceded the Seoul Games, which he photographed from opening to closing ceremonies for the Seoul Olympic Organizing Committee.

McMillan spent the next ten years based in Hong Kong, travelling on assignments everywhere from Afghanistan to Japan for publications in Asia, North America and Europe. His photographs and articles from an unprecedented five visits to isolated North Korea ran worldwide, including on the covers of TIME, Newsweek, the New York Times and L’Express, and in the Encyclopædia Britannica. He visited Mainland China on assignment almost fifty times, and in May 1989 was possibly the only journalist to photograph Chinese Army tanks parked up in a western suburb of Beijing. A week later, the tanks rolled into Tiananmen Square.

== Author ==
Upon returning to Scotland in 1998, McMillan concentrated on writing and illustrating travel and business features for broadsheet newspapers such as The Herald and Independent on Sunday. His first travel book about the Shetland Islands, Between Weathers, was published in June 2008 by Sandstone Press. Between Weathers was nominated for the prestigious Saltire Society First Book Award. It is also the inspiration for the movie of the same name - the first to be shot entirely in Shetland in the past 74 years, for which McMillan is an Associate Producer.

McMillan's first foray into published fiction was released by Sandstone Press in June 2010. Yin Yang Tattoo is a crime thriller set in South Korea, and, according to the author, "represents the first in a new series of thrillers with the same central character, and set in various Asian capitals known well to me from my time freelancing around the region."

== Bibliography ==
- Between Weathers, Travels in 21st Century Shetland (2008) Travel
- Yin Yang Tattoo (2010) Crime thriller
