= Ian Donald Cochrane Hopkins =

- Born: 16 July 1943; Darvel, Scotland
- Citizenship: United Kingdom
- Education: London University
- Occupations: comedy writer and management consultant
- Writing career
- Language: English
- Subject: Economics

Ian Donald Cochrane Hopkins (also known as IDC Hopkins or Ian D. C. Hopkins or Ian Hopkins) is a Scottish comedy writer and management consultant. He was born in Darvel, Ayrshire on 16 July 1943. Hopkins attended Kilmarnock Academy before pursuing a career in Industrial Engineering.

== Career ==
Hopkins undertook a Bachelor of Science degree in Economics at London University, following which he became a lecturer in Management at the University of the West of Scotland.

Hopkins comedy writing career began as a contracted writer for Naked Radio, Six of the Best, Not the Nine O'Clock News, Three of a Kind, Naked Video and Spitting Image.

Hopkins has had three stage plays performed. Albatross Soup (co-authored with John Duignan), Citizen Singh (co-authored with Gurmeet Mattu) and Every Bloody Sunday (co-authored with Gurmeet Mattu).

Hopkins has also had three satirical novels published, each co-authored with John Duignan: Skelp the Aged in 2016; The Buick Stops Here in 2017; and The Lambshank Redemption in 2019.

Hopkins and Duignan began writing Skelp the Aged as a play, before deciding to make it a novel. The three novels in the trilogy by Hopkins and Duignan follow hapless anti-heroes Mungo and Ethel Laird, in and out of trouble - and jail - as they struggle to maintain a living as bookies.

Hopkins also co-authored Shit Yourself Laughing with Frank Muir.

In 2020, Hopkins' satirical novella, A Glutton-Free Diet, was published by Pegasus Publishers. The story takes place on the Isle of Arran and is set against the background of the New Labour government unveiling its proposals for a Scottish Parliament. The protagonists, in their own ways, represent the major contemporary influences in the 1997 Scottish devolution debate.

In July 2024, Hopkins' latest novella, The Granny State of Drumhumble, was published.

Set in the Scottish Highlands, the novella is a "Satirical meta-fiction where Brigadoon meets Brave New World".

In January 2026, Hopkins' latest novel, Rory's Swing, Tiger's Blood, was published.

Rory's Swing, Tiger's Blood is about Levid Brittain, an ex-police officer, hatching a plan to help a 13 year old boy win a golf championship.
