= Elizabeth Storie =

Scottish writer, milliner and seamstress (1818–1897)

- Born: July 1818; Glasgow, Scotland
- Died: 1897 (aged 78–79); Peebles, Scotland
- Occupations: Seamstress, milliner, writer

Elizabeth Storie (July 1818 – 1897) was a Scottish writer, milliner and seamstress. She was a working-class woman from Glasgow who, through her 1859 autobiography, gave an account of the challenges she faced within medical, legal, and ecclesiastical systems as a disabled woman in early Victorian Scotland.

Her work is noted for providing a rare disabled female working-class account of navigating these institutions and overcoming legal bias to get compensation for medical malpractice. Her hybrid autobiography is unusual in combining personal narrative with various documentation to showcase her efforts to get justice and while challenging societal norms of the time.

== Biography ==
=== Early life and mercury poisoning ===
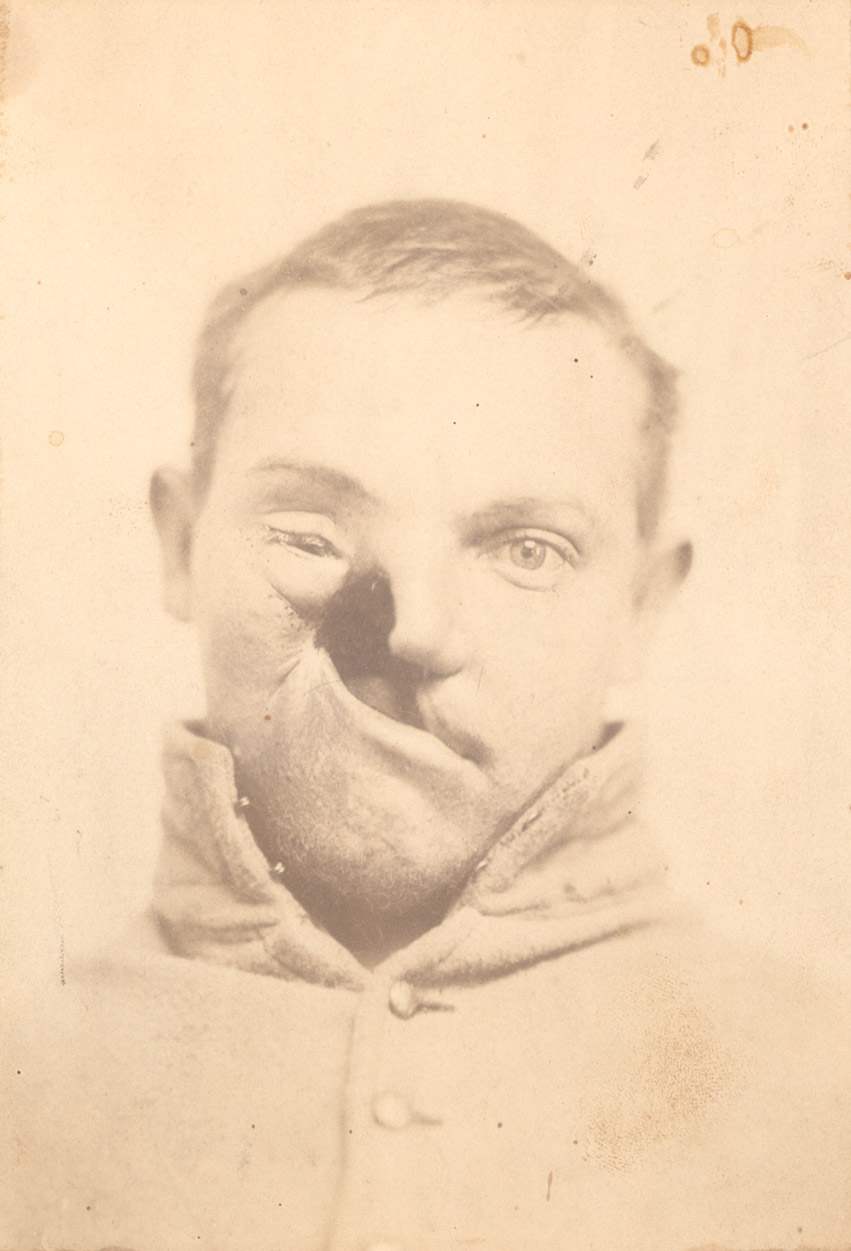
There are no known photographs of Elizabeth Storie, but this 1862 photograph of Carleton Burgan shows the results of similar damage to the mouth and face caused by calomel.

Elizabeth Storie was born in Glasgow in July 1818 to "poor but respectable parents", as she writes in her autobiography: a cotton weaver and a cotton winder. When she was four she became sick with a disease she describes as "nettle-rush", which children usually recovered from in a few days. However, a neighbour and friend of the family who was a surgeon, Robert Falconer, insisted on treating Storie with daily doses of calomel, a common medicine at the time that contained mercury and was a frequent cause of mercury poisoning. Storie became increasingly ill and after three weeks her face and mouth were black and putrid. Falconer then gave her aquafortis, a form of nitric acid that he forced into her mouth using a syringe. Storie writes that "the agony I suffered from this cruel operation was so dreadful that I did not know what I was doing". When Falconer repeated this a few minutes later, Storie describes her tongue falling off, her teeth falling out and part of her jaw bone giving way, which left her in chronic pain.

The Stories consulted another doctor, John Campbell, who concluded this to be a case of medical "neglect." Falconer had prescribed one more powder, which he called a "certain cure." Fortunately, Storie's suspicious parents did not administer it and instead had Drs Lorimer Corbett and James Corkindale analyze it. Both doctors subsequently confirmed the powder contained "a large quantity of arsenic," validating the parents' belief it "was intended to have put an end to […] [her] existence, and thus to have concealed from the world all trace of the bungling and unskillful treatment of a man who had to earn his livelihood by the practice of medicine."

Storie recovered, but her face was permanently disfigured. Her jaw bones had grown soft, and surgery had to be performed to remove part of the bone. On healing the bone stiffened so she could not eat or drink until a small hole was made allowing her to suck food from a tin.

Storie's autobiography does not include a photograph or drawing of her face, but scholars Dana Graham Lai and Holly Faith Nelson argue that the disfigurement was probably similar to the well-documented case of Carleton Burgan, who suffered a similar case of mercury poisoning when he was given calomel to treat an infection in 1862.

Storie's father sued Falconer, but although the court ordered the doctor to pay £1000 in compensation, he refused to pay. Storie's father died soon after.

=== Adult life ===
Storie was frequently ill and in pain, and had more than twenty surgeries during her lifetime. She and her family fought extended legal battles but never succeeded in receiving compensation for the damages done to her by Falconer.

Storie lived with her family, moving to her brother's home after her mother died in 1849. The 1871 census shows her living independently and having moved to Edinburgh, where she worked as a dressmaker.

=== Death ===
Storie died in Peebles in 1897 from influenza and pneumonia. She left what money she had - £39 - to the Royal Association of Incurables in Edinburgh.

== Autobiography ==
Storie published her autobiography in 1859, when she was forty-one. The title demonstrates the main purpose of the book: to explain the injustice done to her: The Autobiography of Elizabeth Storie, A Native of Glasgow, Who Was Subjected to Much Injustice at the Hands of Some Members of the Medical, Legal, and Clerical Professions. The novel was published by subscription, meaning that money was collected from subscribers to pay for the printing of the book.

It was very unusual for working-class women to publish their autobiographies in the mid-nineteenth century, and those that were published were, like Storie's, mostly tales of ill treatment that had attracted the support of middle-class patrons. Mary Prince's dictated autobiography about her life living as a slave is another example, but in general, most working-class writers were men. Storie and Prince's autobiographies fall into the category of "appeal memoirs", a genre also used by middle-class and upper-class women who had been ill-treated. The appeal is clear from the first paragraph of Storie's book:

Having a strong impression that injustice is often done to the poor, and more especially to the women of that class, who are more defenceless, both from their sex, and from the difficulty which poverty combined with it exposes them to, in obtaining the help of those who are their natural protectors, I have been induced to publish a statement of the wrongs and trials I have been subjected to, in the hope of encouraging those who may be similarly afflicted to put their trust in God, as they too often will find that "vain is the help of man". The facts which will be brought to light may also serve to warn those in high power of the danger of doing injustice or injury to any, trusting that through the insignificance of their victims the world may never know how much they have made others to suffer.

The autobiography combines Storie's own narration with documentary evidence including court transcripts and letters from doctors and others certifying facts. This is a common strategy for autobiographies at the time, and was used by women to legitimize their stories. The autobiography also draws upon the genres of horror in its detailed descriptions of surgeries and abuse, and spiritual autobiography in Storie's description of her journey from being a sinner to a devoted member of the church. Literary scholars Lai and Nelson argue that this genre fusion allows Storie to destabilise "those that tend to represent the dis/abled in a static way", for instance featuring "the narrative trajectory of a heroic 'triumph over adversity'".

== Published works ==
- Elizabeth Storie, The Autobiography of Elizabeth Storie, A Native of Glasgow, Who Was Subjected to Much Injustice at the Hands of Some Members of the Medical, Legal, and Clerical Professions (Glasgow: Richard Stobbs, 1859)

== See also ==
- Autobiography
- Proletarian literature
- Disability studies
