= Margaret Ryan =

Scottish children's writer (1944–2019)

Margaret Ryan (1944–2019) was a Scottish children's writer.

== Biography ==
Ryan was born and raised in the town of Paisley, Scotland. She went to the University of Glasgow, where she met her husband, John, at a dance, and they had two children, Susie and Jonathan.

She had a long career as a primary-school teacher before becoming a full-time writer for children. She was the writer of the Airy Fairy books.

Ryan lived in St. Andrews, Scotland.

=== Books ===
- Airy Fairy: Magic Mischief
- Airy Fairy: Magic Muddle
- Airy Fairy: Magic Mess
- Airy Fairy: Magic Mix-up
- Airy Fairy: Magic Mistakes
- Airy Fairy: Magic Music
- Airy Fairy's Book of Magic

== See also ==
- List of children's literature writers
- List of fantasy writers
- List of Scottish novelists
- List of University of Glasgow people
- List of women writers
