= Sharon McPherson =

Scottish writer and book publisher

Sharon McPherson (16 June 1965 – 24 August 2021) is a Scottish writer and book publisher. She writes works of non-fiction and fiction under the pseudonym Cambella McMahon.

== Biography ==
She was born in Dundee, Scotland, where she attended Dundee College, gaining a diploma in Publication Production, Editing and Design. Later, she studied at the University of Dundee and graduated with a degree in English. She moved to Edinburgh in 2007, to research her first novel, a romantic satire (yet unpublished). She lived for a year in the city before moving back to her hometown in 2008.

Her own publishing company, Pumpkin Press, was founded in 2006, initially to market her own titles. The company now sells books and postcards about Dundee.

Her first book, A Skirt Around Dundee, A Walker's Guide to the City, was published in 2006. It is a guide set out in a series of walks around the city. Her second book, Dew on the Law, And Other Strange Stories About A Scottish City, (2008) is a collection of historical fiction about Dundee. She illustrated her first two books with her own drawings and photographs.

== Works ==
- McMahon, Cambella (2006). A Skirt Around Dundee, A Walker's Guide to the City. Pumpkin Press Souvenirs. ISBN 978-0-9554490-0-0.
- McMahon, Cambella (2008). Dew on the Law And Other Strange Stories About A Scottish City. Pumpkin Press. ISBN 978-0-9554490-1-7.
