= Carol Anne Davis =

Scottish fiction and crime writer, born 1961

- Born: 1961 (age 64–65); Dundee, Scotland
- Education: University of Dundee; University of Edinburgh
- Occupation: Novelist
- Writing career
- Language: English
- Genre: Crime
- Notable works: Shrouded, Safe As Houses, Noise Abatement

Carol Anne Davis (born 1961 in Dundee, Scotland), is a Scottish crime novelist and a writer on crimes, especially those committed by children or young people.

== Biography ==
Davis left school at 15, and later graduated from the University of Dundee with an MA in criminology. As a postgraduate she received a diploma in adult and community education from the University of Edinburgh. In 1998, she left Scotland and moved to the south of England, where she lives today.

== Writing ==
Her first three novels are set in the Marchmont district of Edinburgh, where she lived for many years.

Her début novel, Shrouded, has a trainee funeral director as protagonist. It charts his alcohol-fuelled descent into necrophilia and sexually motivated murder. It was followed by Safe As Houses, which explores the murders of a sadistic white-collar psychopath and his unsuspecting wife and child. Also set in Edinburgh, Noise Abatement is the most autobiographical of Davis's novels, in that she, like the protagonist, endured neighbours from hell when a band moved into the flat above her. She fantasized about killing them, but the hitherto law-abiding, but sleep-deprived man in the novel carries out this out. Davis set her fourth novel, Kiss It Away, in Salisbury, where she had moved. It is an unsettling exploration of male-on-male rape and of how society ignores or makes light of this violent crime. The venue of her fifth novel, Sob Story, is her birthplace, Dundee. It charts the journey of an isolated university student and her pen-pal, a violent inmate of Maidstone Prison. It was followed by Extinction, which is set in the world of bereavement counselling and features a white collar psychopath. This, in turn, was followed by Near Death Experience, a novel which draws on the author's awareness of Munchausens-by-proxy and the havoc wreaked by nurses who are personality disordered.

Between novels, Carol Anne Davis has written several books on crime, each profiling a killer's childhood and formative experiences. For Women Who Kill: Profiles of Female Serial Killers, she interviewed the clergyman who heard Myra Hindley's confession, and arrived at what has been called a fair assessment of a complex case. She also contributed to the anthology, Masters of True Crime (Prometheus Books 2012).

Children Who Kill: Profiles of Preteen and Teenage Killers includes details of her friendship with the then-youngest boy in Scotland ever to be charged with attempted murder. She also interviewed the detective who caught Britain's youngest serial killer, Peter Dinsdale, and found unique details about the case. In Couples Who Kill: Profiles of Deviant Duos, she met one of the surviving victims of Fred and Rosemary West, as well as corresponding with a convicted British serial killer and with a journalist who had spent time with one of America's cruellest torture-killers, now on death row. Sadistic Killers: Profiles of Pathological Predators, included input from a psychiatrist who successfully treated imprisoned psychopaths by helping them come to terms with their brutalizing childhoods. Becoming aware that sexually dominant men in consensual relationships were often dismissed by society in the same way as criminal sadists, she included a chapter on consensual sadomasochism for which she interviewed a female masochist.

Youthful Prey: Child Predators Who Kill profiles some British, US, Canadian and European homicidal pedophiles and has chapters on treatment options and child protection. An excerpt appeared in The Sunday Times.

"Masking Evil: When Good Men And Women Turn Criminal" includes interviews with a psychologist and two criminologists and profiles 37 pillars of the community who were murderers, paedophiles or repeatedly abusive parents.

Crime, horror, erotic and literary short stories by Davis have appeared in anthologies, and humorous, crime and lifestyle features in magazines. She also writes in-depth features for Serial Killer Quarterly, a subscription-based e-magazine.

== Bibliography ==
- Shrouded (1997)
- Safe As Houses (1999)
- Noise Abatement (2000)
- Women Who Kill (2001)
- Kiss It Away (2003)
- Children Who Kill (2003)
- Couples Who Kill (2005)
- Sob Story (2007)
- Sadistic Killers (2007)
- Youthful Prey (2008)
- Doctors Who Kill (2010)
- Extinction (2011)
- Parents Who Kill (updated edition 2013)
- Near Death Experience (2014)
- Masking Evil (2016)
