= Brian McCabe (author) =

British writer (born 1951)

Brian McCabe (born 1951) is a Scottish writer, tutor and editor, best known for his short stories and poetry.

McCabe grew up in Bonnyrigg, a mining community near Edinburgh. He studied literature and philosophy at the University of Edinburgh, where he met other young writers such as Ron Butlin and Andrew Greig. He was also influenced by older Edinburgh poets like Norman MacCaig and Robert Garioch. Alongside Greig, Butlin and Liz Lochhead, McCabe was part of "The Lost Poets," a loose collective that organised readings and events in central Scotland during the early 1970s.

Since 1980, McCabe has written full-time and has held fellowships in Scotland and abroad, including a residency at the University of Edinburgh. He has published three collections of short stories, a novel, The Other McCoy (1991), and five volumes of poetry. His anthology Selected Stories was released in 2003. McCabe has also written radio drama.

In 2004, McCabe became editor of the Edinburgh Review. He has been a creative writing tutor at several institutions, including the universities of Lancaster, St. Andrews, and Edinburgh, as well as participating in community projects.
