= James Peddie (author) =

Scottish writer

James Anderson Peddie was a Scottish writer, mostly of non-fiction. He wrote Capture of London (1887), about London being invaded via a Channel Tunnel.

== Works ==
- Capture of London (London: General Publishing Co, 1887)
- (ed.) Cast Ashore on Christmas Eve (London: Newsagents' Pub Co, 1868) [anth: chap: Club Story: pb/]
- The Registered Letter
