= Mea Allan =

British writer, journalist and biographer

- Born: Mary Eleanor Allan; 23 June 1909; Bearsden
- Died: 29 August 1982 (aged 73); Walberswick, Suffolk
- Occupations: Writer, journalist, biographer

Mea Allan (23 June 1909 – 29 August 1982), born Mary Eleanor Allan, was a journalist who worked for the Glasgow Herald. She also wrote a novel, Change of Heart (1943), set in the future. In 1967 she was awarded the Leverhulme Research Scholarship to write about the botanists William Hooker and Joseph Dalton Hooker.

== Early life and education ==
Allan was born in Bearsden, Dumbartonshire, Scotland, the daughter of Robert Greenoak Allan and Helen (née Maitland). She was educated at Park School, Glasgow, and the Central School of Speech Training and Dramatic Art.

== Career ==
=== Journalism ===
Allan was a journalist, the first woman war correspondent to be permanently accredited to the British Forces and the first woman news editor in Fleet Street. She worked for the Glasgow Herald during and after World War II. She was living in London in 1940, where she described the wartime tension as "You felt you really were walking with death—death in front of you and death hovering in the skies." She reported from Germany in 1945, about death camp survivors and displaced persons temporarily sheltered at Belsen after the war, awaiting rehabilitation, family reunification, and transportation.

=== Other writing ===
Allan's first book was a novel, Lonely (1942). Her second novel, Change of Heart, written in 1943, is about an alternate history (then future) in which the Allies win World War II, but are threatened by a resurgent Nazism.

Much of Allan's writing was about botany, including histories of gardens, biographies of famous gardeners and plant collectors, and guides for gardeners. In 1967 she was awarded the Leverhulme Research Scholarship to write on the botanists William Hooker and Joseph Dalton Hooker. In 1977 she wrote a book about Darwin's use of flowers to develop his theory of natural selection.

== Death and legacy ==
Allan died in 1982, in Walberswick, Suffolk, England. A collection of her papers was donated to the Centre for the Conservation of Historic Parks and Gardens at York University. There are other papers of hers in the Imperial War Museum's Department of Documents. In 1999, Felicity Goodall wrote a BBC Radio program titled "Change of Heart," about Allan's life and career.

== Select Bibliography ==
- Lonely (1942, novel)
- Change of Heart (1943, novel)
- Rose Cottage (1961)
- The Tradescants: Their Plants, Gardens and Museum 1570-1662 (1964)
- The Hookers of Kew 1785-1911 (1967)
- Tom's Weeds: The Story of Rochford's and their House Plants (1970)
- Fison's Guide to Gardens in England, Scotland, Ireland and Wales (1970)
- Palgrave of Arabia: The Life of William Gifford Palgrave, 1826-88 (1972)
- E. A. Bowles & his garden at Myddelton House (1865-1954) (1973)
- Plants that Changed Our Gardens (1974)
- Gardens of East Anglia (1975)
- Darwin and His Flowers: The Key to Natural Selection (1977)
- The Gardener's Book of Weeds (1978)
- Weeds: The Unbidden Guests in our Gardens (1978)
- The Family of Flowers (1979)
- William Robinson, 1838-1935: Father of the English Flower Garden (1982)
