= Dilys Rose =

Scottish writer and poet

Dilys Rose is a Scottish fiction writer and poet. Born in 1954 in Glasgow, Rose studied at Edinburgh University, where she taught creative writing from 2002 until 2017. She was Director of the MSc in Creative Writing by Online Learning from 2012 to 2017. She is currently a Royal Literary Fellow at the University of Glasgow. Her third novel Unspeakable was published by Freight Books in 2017.

== Awards and honours ==
Rose has won many awards, including the Canongate Prize, the Macallan/Scotland on Sunday Short Story Competition, and a Robert Louis Stevenson Memorial Award; she has also been awarded a Society of Authors travel bursary and a UNESCO City of Literature exchange fellowship. Her poem 'Sailmaker's Palm' won the 2006 McCash Poetry Prize, and her poetry collection Bodywork was shortlisted for the Sundial Scottish Arts Council Book Award. Rose's novel Red Tides won the 1993 Scottish Arts Council Book Award, as well as being shortlisted for the Saltire Society Scottish Book of the Year Award and the McVitie's Prize for Scottish Writer of the Year.

== Selected works ==
=== Poetry ===
- Madame Doubtfire's Dilemma, Chapman, 1989
- When I Wear My Leopard Hat: Poems for Young Children (illustrated by Gill Allan), Scottish Children's Press, 1997
- Lure, Chapman, 2003
- Bodywork, Luath, 2007
- Stone the Crows, Mariscat, 2020

=== Fiction ===
- Our Lady of the Pickpockets, Secker & Warburg, 1989
- Red Tides, Secker & Warburg, 1993
- War Dolls, Headline Review, 1998
- Pest Maiden, Headline Review, 1999 -
- Lord of Illusions, Luath Press, 2005 - "proves adept at swiftly establishing a mood"
- Selected Stories, Luath Press, 2005
- Pelmanism, Luath Press, 2014
- Unspeakable, Freight Books, 2017
- Sea Fret, Scotland Street Press, 2022

=== Short stories ===
- Sea Fret, Scotland Street Press, 2022
