= List of Scottish novelists =

This is an alphabetical list of Scottish novelists. It includes novelists of all genres writing in English, Scots, Gaelic or any other language. Novelists writing in the Scottish tradition are part of the development of the novel in Scotland.

This is a subsidiary list to the list of Scottish writers.

== A ==
- Gilbert Adair (1944–2011)
- Jane Alexander (born 1974)
- William Alexander (1826–1894), Johnny Gibb of Gushetneuk
- Dot Allan (1886–1984), Hunger March
- Mea Allan (1909–1982)
- Lin Anderson (living)
- Campbell Armstrong (1944–2013), Assassins & Victims

== B ==
- Andrew Balfour (1873–1931)
- Robert Michael Ballantyne (1825–1894), The Coral Island
- Iain Banks (1954–2013), mainstream and science fiction
- James Barke (1905–1958), The Land of the Leal
- Elspeth Barker (1940–2022)
- J. M. Barrie (1860–1937), Peter Pan
- Alistair Beaton (born 1947), A Planet for the President
- Eric Temple Bell (1883–1960)
- Margot Bennett (1912–1980)
- Alan Bissett (born 1975), Boyracers
- Margaret Moyes Black (1853–1935)
- William Black (1841–1898)
- Sheena Blackhall (born 1947)
- Iain Blair (1942–2011)
- George Blake (1893–1961), The Shipbuilders
- Don Boyd (born 1948)
- William Boyd (born 1952), The Blue Afternoon
- Christopher Brookmyre (born 1968)
- George Douglas Brown (1869–1902), The House with the Green Shutters
- George Mackay Brown (1921–1996), Beside the Ocean of Time
- Gordon Brown (born 20th century), Falling
- Mary Brunton (1778–1818), Self-Control
- John Buchan (1875–1940), The Thirty-Nine Steps
- Mary Anne Burges (1763–1813), The Progress of the Pilgrim Good-Intent, in Jacobinical Times
- Haldane Burgess (1862–1927), The Viking Path – A Tale of the White Christ
- Graeme Macrae Burnet (born 1967)
- John Burnside (1955–2024)

== C ==
- Janet Caird (1913–1992), The Umbrella-Maker's Daughter
- Allan Cameron (born 1952)
- Angus Peter Campbell (born 1954)
- Dorothea Primrose Campbell (1793–1863)
- Harriette Campbell (1817–1841)
- John Campbell (1708–1775)
- Catherine Carswell (1879–1946)
- Glenn Chandler (born 1949)
- Marion Chesney (also M. C. Beaton, Ann Fairfax, Jennie Tremaine, Helen Crampton, Charlotte Ward, and Sarah Chester, 1936–2019)
- Thomas Clark (born 1980)
- J. Storer Clouston (1870–1944)
- Michael Cobley (born 1959)
- Jenny Colgan (also Jane Beaton and J. T. Colgan, born 1972)
- Sophie Cooke (born 1976)
- Dominic Cooper (born 1944)
- Grace Corbett (also M. Corbett, c. 1765/1770–1843)
- Helen Craik (1751–1825), Adelaide de Narbonne
- John Adam Cramb (also R. A. Revermont, 1862–1913)
- S. R. Crockett (1860–1914), The Black Douglas
- A. J. Cronin (1896–1981), The Citadel
- Andrew Crumey (born 1961)
- Charles Cumming (born 1971)
- Allan Cunningham (1784–1842)
- Walterina Cunningham (also M. Corbett, c. 1765/1770 – 1837)

== D ==
- Robert Mackenzie Daniel (1813–1847)
- John Davidson (1857–1909)
- Elspeth Davie (1918–1995), Coming to Light
- Carol Anne Davis (born 1961)
- Charlotte Louisa Hawkins Dempster (1835–1913)
- Des Dillon (born 1960)
- Lady Florence Dixie (1855–1905), Gloriana; or, The Revolution of 1900
- Anne Donovan (living), Buddha Da
- Colin Douglas (Colin Thomas Currie, born 1945), medical novels
- Norman Douglas (1868–1952)
- O. Douglas (1877–1948), pen name of Anna Masterton Buchan
- Sir Arthur Conan Doyle (1859–1930), creator of the Great Detective
- Andrew Drummond (living), The Books of the Incarceration of the Lady Grange
- John Duignan (1946–2019)
- Hal Duncan (born 1971), real name Alasdair
- Jane Duncan (1910–1976)
- Dorothy Dunnett (1923–2001)

== E ==
- Margaret Elphinstone (born 1948), The Sea Road
- Amber Eve (born 1976), Cool Girl Summer

== F ==
- Michel Faber (born 1960)
- Jenni Fagan (born 1977)
- Alison Fell (born 1944)
- Craig Ferguson (born 1962)
- Susan Edmonstone Ferrier (1782–1854), Marriage
- Matthew Fitt (born 1968), But n Ben A-Go-Go
- Aminatta Forna (born 1964)
- Ronald Frame (born 1953), Unwritten Secrets
- George MacDonald Fraser (1925–2008), Flashman

== G ==
- Iain Gale (born 1959)
- Janice Galloway (born 1955)
- John Galt (1779–1839), Ringan Gilhaize
- Pat Gerber (1934–2006)
- Charles Gibbon (1843–1890), Dangerous Connexions
- Lewis Grassic Gibbon (1901–1935), Sunset Song
- Lesley Glaister (born 1956)
- Richard Gordon (1947–2009), science fiction
- Kenneth Grahame (1859–1932), The Wind in the Willows
- James Grant (1822–1887)
- Alasdair Gray (1934–2019), Lanark
- Andrew Greig (born 1951), The Return of John MacNab
- Gavin Greig (1856–1914), Logie o' Buchan
- Neil Gunn (1891–1973), The Silver Darlings
- Allan Guthrie (born 1965)

== H ==
- Thomas Hamilton (1789–1842)
- Tom Hanlin (1907–1953), Once in Every Lifetime
- James Hannay (1827–1873)
- Ian Hay (1876–1952), pseudonym of John Hay Beith
- John MacDougall Hay (1879–1919), Gillespie
- Thomas Nicoll Hepburn (1861–1930), pseudonym Gabriel Setoun
- James Hogg (1770–1835)
- Stuart Hood (1915–2011)

== J ==
- Violet Jacob (1863–1946), Flemington
- Robert Alan Jamieson (born 1958)
- Quintin Jardine (born 1945)
- Robin Jenkins (1912–2005), The Cone Gatherers
- D. D. Johnston (born 1979)
- Morag Joss (born 1955)

== K ==
- Jackie Kay (born 1961)
- Henrietta Keddie (1827–1914), Beauty and the Beast, pseudonym Sarah Tytler
- Isabella Kelly (1759–1857), Eva
- Mary Kelly (1927–2017)
- James Kelman (born 1946)
- James Kennaway (1928–1968), Tunes of Glory
- A. L. Kennedy (born 1965)
- Peter Kerr (living)
- Philip Kerr (1956–2018)
- Jessie Kesson (1916–1994), The White Bird Passes
- William King (born 1959)
- Bill Knox (1928–1999)

== L ==
- Ross Laidlaw (living), The Linton Porcupine
- Laura Lam (living), Pantomime
- Helen Lamb (1956–2017), Three Kinds of Kissing
- Ross Leckie (born 1957)
- Charlotte Lennox (c. 1730–1804) The Female Quixote
- Tom Leonard (1944–2018)
- Iain Levison (born 1963)
- David Lindsay (1876–1945). A Voyage to Arcturus
- Frederic Lindsay (1933–2013), Brond
- Eric Linklater (1899–1974) Private Angelo
- John Gibson Lockhart (1794–1854), Adam Blair
- Kirsty Logan (born 1984), The Gracekeepers

== M ==
- George MacBeth (1932–1992)
- Stuart MacBride (born 1969)
- Hugh MacColl (1831–1909)
- Fionn MacColla (1906–1975), And the Cock Crew
- George MacDonald (1824–1905), Phantastes
- Helen Clark MacInnes (1907–1985), Assignment in Brittany
- John Henry Mackay (1864–1933), The Hustler
- Shena Mackay (born 1944), Heligoland
- Compton Mackenzie (1883–1972), Whisky Galore!
- Henry Mackenzie (1745–1831), The Man of Feeling
- Ian Maclaren (1850–1907), pseudonym of John Watson
- Alistair MacLean (1922–1987), The Guns of Navarone
- Ken MacLeod (born 1954), science fiction
- Sarah Broom Macnaughtan (1864–1916), novelist and relief worker
- Kevin MacNeil (living), The Stornoway Way
- Ian Macpherson (1905–1944), Wild Harbour
- Angus MacVicar (1908–2001)
- Laura Marney (living)
- Bruce Marshall (1899–1987)
- Allan Massie (1938–2026), Cold Winter in Bordeaux
- Rosaline Masson (1867–1949)
- Graham Masterton (born 1946)
- Gavin Maxwell (1914–1969), novelist, journalist and explorer
- Herbert Maxwell (1845–1937)
- Peter May (born 1951)
- Isabella Fyvie Mayo (1843–1914), The Secret Drawer
- Scott McBain (born 1960)
- Val McDermid (born 1955)
- Iain McDowall (living)
- William McIlvanney (1936–2015)
- J. T. McIntosh (1925–2008)
- Pat McIntosh (living)
- Graham McNeill (living)
- John McNeillie (1916–2002), Wigtown Ploughman
- Candia McWilliam (born 1955)
- James Meek (born 1962), The People's Act of Love
- Denzil Meyrick (born 1965)
- Martin Millar (living), pseudonym Martin Scott
- Denise Mina (born 1966)
- Naomi Mitchison (1897–1999), We Have Been Warned
- Lorna Moon (1886–1930), Dark Star
- John Moore (1829–1902) Zeluco
- Ewan Morrison (born 1968), Distance
- Willa Muir (1890–1970)
- Helen and Morna Mulgray (born 1939)
- Neil Munro (1863–1930), The New Road

== N ==
- William Napier (born 1940)
- Ian Niall (1916–2002) No Resting Place
- Hume Nisbet (1849–1923) Private Angelo
- John Niven (born 1968) Kill Your Friends

== O ==
- Maggie O'Farrell (born 1972), After You'd Gone
- Andrew O'Hagan (born 1968)
- Margaret Oliphant (1828–1897), Miss Marjoribanks
- Agnes Owens (1926–2014)

== P ==
- Neil Paterson (1915–1995)
- Stef Penney (born 1969) The Tenderness of Wolves
- Andrew Picken (1788–1833), The Dominie's Legacy
- Ricardo Pinto (born 1961)
- Jane Porter (1776–1850) The Scottish Chiefs
- Richard Price (born 1966)

== Q ==
- John Quigley (1925–2021), King's Royal

== R ==
- Hugh C. Rae (1935–2014) The Wind from the Hills
- Janet Milne Rae (1844–1933)
- Hannu Rajaniemi (born 1978), The Quantum Thief
- Caro Ramsay (living)
- Ian Rankin (born 1960)
- James Robertson (born 1958), The Fanatic
- Michael Scott Rohan (1951–2018), The Ice King
- Dilys Rose (born 1954), Unspeakable
- J. K. Rowling (born 1965), Harry Potter
- Archie Roy (1924–2012)
- Brian Ruckley (living)
- Christopher Rush (born 1944), A Twelvemonth and a Day
- Craig Russell (living)

== S ==
- Suhayl Saadi (born 1961)
- Andrew Murray Scott (born 1955)
- Harriet Anne Scott (1816–1894)
- Manda Scott (born 1962)
- Michael Scott (1789–1835)
- Tom Scott (1918–1995)
- Walter Scott (1771–1832), Waverley
- Ann Scott-Moncrieff (1914–1943)
- George Scott-Moncrieff (1910–1974), Burke Street
- Helen Sedgwick (living)
- Alan Sharp (1934–2013), A Green Tree in Gede
- Nan Shepherd (1893–1981), The Quarry Wood
- Sara Sheridan (born 1968), The Fair Botanists
- J. David Simons (born 1953)
- Catherine Sinclair (1800–1864)
- Alexander McCall Smith (born 1948)
- Ali Smith (born 1962)
- Iain Crichton Smith (1928–1998), Consider the Lilies
- Sydney Goodsir Smith (1915–1995), Carotid Cornucopia
- Tobias Smollett (1721–1771), The Adventures of Roderick Random
- Muriel Spark (1918–2006), The Prime of Miss Jean Brodie
- Alan Spence (born 1947), Way to Go
- James Brunton Stephens (1835–1902)
- John Sterling (1806–1844)
- D. E. Stevenson (1892–1973)
- Robert Louis Stevenson (1850–1894), Treasure Island
- Zoë Strachan (born 1975), Negative Space
- John Strang (1795–1863)
- Luke Sutherland (born 1971)
- Annie Shepherd Swan (1859–1943), Aldersyde

== T ==
- Reay Tannahill (1929–2007)
- Emma Tennant (1937–2017), Two Women of London: The Strange Case of Ms. Jekyll and Mrs. Hyde
- Josephine Tey (1896–1952), The Daughter of Time
- Ismar Thiusen (John MacNie, 1844–1909)
- Eleanor Thom (born 1979)
- Alice Thompson (living)
- Margaret Todd (1859–1918)
- Ruthven Todd (1914–1978)
- Jeff Torrington (1935–2008), Swing Hammer Swing
- Nigel Tranter (1909–2000), Trespass
- Alexander Trocchi (1925–1984), Young Adam

== U ==
- Fred Urquhart (1912–1995), Time Will Knit

== W ==
- Alan Warner (born 1964)
- William Watson (1931–2005)
- Irvine Welsh (born 1958), Trainspotting
- Louise Welsh (born 1965), The Cutting Room
- Christopher Whyte (born 1952)
- Jack Whyte (1940–2021)
- George Whyte-Melville (1821–1878), Digby Grand
- David Wolstencroft (born 1969)

== See also ==
- List of novelists
- List of Scottish science fiction writers
