= Jane Alexander (disambiguation) =

Jane Alexander (born 1939) is an American actress, author, and former director of the National Endowment for the Arts.

Jane Alexander may also refer to:

- Jane Alexander (bishop) (born 1959), bishop of the Anglican Church of Canada
- Jane Alexander (1922–2008), American activist; she founded the group Citizens Against Homicide and inspired the book Citizen Jane
- Jane Alexander (artist) (born 1959), South African artist
- Jane Alexander (British actress) (born 1972), British actress
- Jane Alexander (swimmer) (born 1958), British swimmer
- Jane Alexander (author) (born 1974), Scottish novelist and short story writer
- Jane Alexander (politician) (1929–2020), American lawyer, politician, and businesswoman
- Jane Grace Alexander (1848–1932), American banker
