= Arthur A. Dixon =

English artist and illustrator (1872 – 1959)

Arthur Augustus Dixon (8 May 1872 – 1959) was an English artist and illustrator who produced illustrations for authors such as Angela Brazil, Elsie J. Oxenham and Bessie Marchant.

== Life ==
Arthur was born and raised in St Pancras, London by his father, Richard Dixon, a grainer, and his mother Rosa. In 1887 his father died and Rosa moved with Arthur and his two brothers, Frederick and Herbert to Islington.

In 1899, Arthur married Cecil Elsie Soweby in Steyning and together they had one daughter born a year later. The two settled in Berkhamsted until Arthur Dixon died in 1959.

== Work ==
Arthur was a prolific illustrator in his time and made illustrations for reprints of around thirty-five classic works by Charles Dickens, Alfred, Lord Tennyson, Charles Kingsley, Victor Hugo, Elizabeth Gaskell and Washington Irving . The style he employs has been termed 'neo-Pre-Raphaelite' which was indicative of his peers such as Byam Shaw or Eleanor Fortescue-Brickdale.

He also exhibited paintings and drawings at such venues as Royal Academy of Arts, Royal Society of British Artists, as well as the New Gallery.

=== List of Books illustrated by Arthur A. Dixon ===
- Stories from the Bible Illustrated by Arthur Dixon (London: Blackie & Son, 1914)
- Scripture Stories For Children Illustrated by Arthur Dixon (London: Blackie & Son, 1915)
- Hard Cash By Charles Reade
- The Poetical Works of Mathew Arnold
- The Manor House School by Angela Brazil
- Children's Stories From Russian Fairy Tales (Raphael Tuck & Sons)
- The Precious Gift by Theodora Wilson Wilson
- A Princess's Token by E. Everett-Green
- Granny's Wonderful Chair by Frances Browne (1917, available at Project Gutenberg)

=== List of Paintings by Arthur A. Dixon ===
- Offerings (1902) [44 x 60 inches]
- Thomas More with his Daughters Entertaining Cardinal Wolsey [27.8 x 19.9 inches]
- Garden scene with a seated figure reading a book to the foreground, a woman and a young boy looking down a well and children dancing beyond, (1913) [47.6 x 31.9 inches]
- David Copperfield
- The Victor (1915)
- The Queen of Clubs (1902)
- Portrait of Lina Susan Penelope Norman

== Legacy ==
One of his illustrations was sold at Christie's for £7,170 in 2003.

Dixon was characterised by the Dictionary of British Book Illustrators as 'generally competent' and 'conventional and prosaic with sentimental overtones'.
