= George Gleig (priest) =

Scottish soldier, military writer, and priest (1796–1888)

George Robert Gleig (20 April 1796 – 9 July 1888) was a Scottish soldier, military writer, and priest.

== Life ==
Gleig was born in Stirling, Scotland. His parents were George Gleig (1753–1840, Bishop of Brechin from October 1808) and Janet, née Hamilton, youngest daughter of Robert Hamilton of Kilbrackmont. Gleig received his initial education at Stirling Grammar school.

On 21 June 1813, Arthur Wellesley, 1st Duke of Wellington had his last major victory in Spain over the French, at the battle of Vitoria. One month later a young student of divinity, George Robert Gleig, gave up a scholarship to Balliol College to join Wellington's army as an ensign in the 85th Light Infantry. His father, by then Bishop of Brechin, furnished him with £20, a substantial sum, though he notes that the rate at which he could buy readily exchangeable gold coins was poor – he had to pay 6s for every gold dollar, and £5 for a doubloon. On 7 October, Wellington crossed into France for the first time.

On 6 April 1814, Napoleon abdicated, though Wellington did not find out until 12 April. By then, on 10 April he had fought and won the decisive battle of the war at Toulouse. The young divinity student was then sent to the war against the United States, where he fought in five battles (Bladensburg, Baltimore, New Orleans, Washington and Fort Bowyer) and was three times wounded. After peace broke out he resumed his scholarship at Magdalen Hall, Oxford in 1816.

Gleig married Sarah Cameron in 1819, while at Oxford. She was a daughter of Captain Cameron the younger of Kinlochleven. Having taken his B.A. and M.A., the young Gleig took holy orders in 1820. He became curate of Westwell, Kent, and was later appointed to two additional parishes, as curate of Ash and as Rector of Ivychurch.

He wrote a series of articles for Blackwood's Magazine on his Peninsular War experiences; they were collected into a book, published in 1825 as The Subaltern. In 1821 he authored an account of his experiences in the USA as The Campaigns of the British Army at Washington and New Orleans under Generals Ross, Pakenham and Lambert. In 1829 he was invited to meet Wellington, and became a regular house-guest of the Duke. Gleig also wrote The Life of the Duke of Wellington; a revised edition was published by Longmans, Green & Co of London in 1890.

In 1832 George Robert Gleig, by then Chaplain at Royal Hospital Chelsea to the Chelsea pensioners—and a well-known author, mainly on military matters, publicly opposed the Reform Bill before Parliament.

Gleig had excellent relations with the Duke of Wellington, but that did not stop the Iron Duke from issuing a public reprimand in 1840 to Gleig for his plan to educate NCOs and private soldiers:

By Jove! If there is a mutiny in the army – and in all probability we shall have one – you'll see that these new-fangled schoolmasters will be at the bottom of it.

Gleig was appointed Chaplain-General of the Forces in 1844, resigned 1875; from 1846 to 1857 he was Inspector-General of Military Schools. From 27 March 1848, he was a member of the Canterbury Association and joined the management committee, but resigned again on 25 November 1851.

Gleig was a frequent contributor to reviews and magazines, especially Blackwood's Magazine, in which his best-known novel, The Subaltern, appeared in installments. He was also the author of Lives of Warren Hastings, Robert Clive, and Wellington, Military Commanders, Chelsea Pensioners, and other works.

He died at Stratfield Turgis, Hampshire in 1888.

== Works ==
=== Fiction ===
- The Strangers Grave. 1823. London: Printed for Longman, Hurst, Rees, Browne and Green. viii+306pp. Although previously attributed to Thomas De Quincey or Henry Villiers, Gleig's authorship of this work was proven beyond doubt by recent scholarship into Longman's archives.
- The Subaltern. 1825. Edinburgh: William Blackwood; London: T. Cadell. iv+380pp.
- The Chelsea Pensioners. 1829. Colburn. 3 volumes.
- The Country Curate. 1830. Colburn & Bentley. 2 volumes. iv+334pp, ii+354pp.
- Allan Breck. 1834. London : R. Bentley. 3 volumes. iv+324pp, ii+340pp, ii+324pp.
- The Chronicles of Waltham. 1835. London : R. Bentley. 3 volumes. vii+320pp, iv+328pp, iv+380pp.
- The Hussar. 1837. Colburn. 2 volumes. viii+304pp, ii+308pp.
- Chelsea Hospital and its traditions. 1838. London : R. Bentley. 3 volumes. xii+308pp, iv+344pp, iv+296pp.
- The Veterans of Chelsea Hospital. 1838. London : R. Bentley. 3 volumes. iv+264pp, ii+284pp, ii+392pp.
- The Light Dragoon. 1844. Colburn. 2 volumes. viii+310pp, ii+324pp.
- A Glimpse of Oriental Nature. Pictures with verses by a Lady. With Preface, by G.R. Gleig 1865. Dean and Son.
- The Harrises, being an extract from the commonplace-book of Alexander Smith, the Elder. 1870. London: : Wm. H. Allen & Co Edinburgh: William Blackwood and Sons. 3 volumes. viii+338pp, vi+368pp, vi+386pp.

=== Miscellaneous works ===
- A history of the Holy Bible, from the beginning of the world to the establishment of Christianity; with answers to infidel objections .. and a connection of the profane with the sacred writings. By the Rev. Thomas Stackhouse .. The whole corrected and improved .. by The Right Rev. George Gleig 1817. London : printed for Longman, Hurst, Rees, Orme, and Brown; 3 volumes. 12mo.
- A narrative of the campaigns of the British army at Washington and New Orleans under Generals Ross, Pakenham, and Lambert, in the years 1814 and 1815. with some account of the countries visited. by an officer who served in the expedition 1821. London : Murray. 377pp.
- Some observations on the constitution and tendency of the Church Missionary Society. 1824. London : Longman, Hurst, Rees, Orme, Brown and Green. 138pp
- The Subaltern's Log Book: including anecdotes of well known military characters. 1828.London : J. Ridgway. 2 volumes.
- Sermons, doctrinal and practical. 1829. London : John Murray. ix+309pp.
- The life of Major-General Sir Thomas Munro, Bart. and K.C.B., late Governor of Madras. With extracts from his correspondence and private papers. 1830 London : H. Colbrn and R. Bentley. 3 volumes. xxii+520pp, iv+454pp, viii+437pp.
- The history of the British Empire in India. 1830-1835. London : Murray 4 volumes
- Lives of the most eminent British military commanders. 1831-1832 London : Longman. 3 volumes. 359pp, 359pp, 376pp.
- A Guide to the Holy Sacrament of the Lord's Supper. 1835. London : Printed for J.G. & F. Rivington. v+164pp.
- The Soldier's Help to the knowledge of divine truth: a series of discourses, delivered in the Chapel of the Royal Military Hospital, Chelsea 1835. London : Printed for J.G. & F. Rivington. xx+387pp.
- The family history of England 1836. London: John W. Parker. 3 volumes. Vol 1 1836. x+360pp+8pp of approved books for the society for promotion of Christian knowledge. Vol 2 - vi+368pp+8pp of approved books for the society for promotion of Christian knowledge. 8vo.
- Germany, Bohemia, and Hungary, visited in 1837. 1839 London:John W Parker. 3 volumes xvi+324pp, iv+415pp, iv+408pp.
- The life of Oliver Cromwell. 1840. Charles Lane, Sanbornton, NH.191pp.
- Memoirs of the life of The Right Hon. Warren Hastings, first Governor-General of Bengal. Compiled from original papers. 1841. London : Richard Bentley. 3 volumes. xvi+544pp, iv+591pp, iv+546pp.
- A Memoir of the late Major-General Robert Craufurd, reprinted from the Military Panorama of October 1812. With an account of his funeral, by the author of "The Subaltern" 1842 Private impression: London. 32pp
- Sermons for the seasons of Advent, Christmas, and the Epiphany. 1844. London. G.W.Nickisson. vi+279pp.
- A sketch of the military history of Great Britain. 1845. London .London, J. W. Parker. 16mo. viii+304pp. .
- Sale's Brigade in Afghanistan, with an account of the seizure and defence of Jellalabad. 1846. London: Murray. Green cloth. 182pp.
- Story of the Battle of Waterloo. 1847 John Murray: London. ix+428pp
- The life of Robert, first Lord Clive. 1848 London : J. Murray. vi+314pp.
- History of the British Colonies. 1850 London: Longman, Brown, Green and Longmans. vii+151pp
- Sacred history. 1851. Longman, Brown, Green and Longmans. School Series. Issued in 2 separate parts, but numbered to make one bound volume. vii+148pp, vi+(149-320)pp.
- The Leipsic Campaign. 1852. London: Longman, Brown, Green and Longmans. viii+128pp, 129-262pp.
- Religion in the Ranks; or, letters from soldiers in the British Army: [edited, and] with an introduction by the Chaplain-General of the Army (G. R. G.), and preface by the Chaplain of the Forces, Dublin (W. Hare). 1856 London: The Religious Tract Society.104pp
- India and its army. An essay. 1857. London: Longman, Brown, Green and Roberts. xvi+39pp.
- Story of the Peninsular War. By the late Marquis of Londonderry .With continuation by G.R. Gleig. 1857. London : James Blackwood. xii+324pp.
- Essays biographical, historical, and miscellaneous; contributed chiefly to the Edinburgh and Quarterly Reviews. 1858 . London: Longman, Brown, Green, Longmans & Roberts. 2 volumes. xii+467pp, iv+531pp.
- Book of biography. 1860. London: Longman, Green, Longman and Roberts. vi+113pp.
- History of the Life of Arthur, Duke of Wellington. From the French of M. Brialmont. With emendations and additions by the Rev. G. R. Gleig. 1858-1860. Longman & Co.: London, 4 volumes. After the translation of this volume, Gleig published his own life, based on these volumes - 'The life of Arthur, first duke of Wellington'. 1862. London : Longman, Green, Longman, and Roberts xii+727pp. Original 4 vols translation,
- The Soldier's Manual of Devotion. 1862. London: The Society for promoting Christian Knowledge. 48pp.
- C. Werner's Jerusalem, Bethlehem and the Holy Places: with descriptive letterpress. 1865 Pt. 1-6. London: Moors, Mcqueen & Co. 48pp+18 boards with 18 watercolour illustrations by Werner. Letterpress by Gleig.
- The Church in the army. With a resume of the recent 'Address' of the chaplain-general. 1868
- The life of Sir Walter Scott. Reprinted with corrections and additions from the Quarterly Review. 1871. Edinburgh : A & C. Black. viii+134pp

=== As editor ===
These 2 books are curiosities. In the first Gleig explains he is putting his name to the book to help the young author achieve recognition she deserves. In the second, the author has died, obviously soon after the first book has been published and Gleig has put his name to the posthumous work, which otherwise would not have been published. Of the author Harriette Campbell, we know very little as Gleig refuses to tell. He promised a work on her life but this was never forthcoming. The author also had another novel 'Cardinal Virtues', posthumously printed by J.W. Parker in 1841, but Gleig had no connection with this work.

- The Only Daughter; a domestic story. 1839. London: : Henry Colburn. 3 volumes. ix+308pp, ii+296pp, ii+271pp.In the introduction, Gleig explains why he is putting his name to a book which is not written by himself.
- Self-Devotion, or The history of Katherine Randolph. 1842 Henry Colburn: London. 3 volumes. viii+284pp, iv+285pp, ii+293pp. Gleig explains briefly in a preface why he is producing another of Miss Campbell's books under his own name.
