= Emma L. Brock =

American author and illustrator

Emma Lillian Brock
- Born: June 11, 1886; Fort Shaw, Montana, U.S.
- Died: August 17, 1974 (aged 88)
- Resting place: Lakeside Cemetery, Hastings, Dakota County, Minnesota
- Education: University of Minnesota; Arts Student League
- Occupations: children's author, illustrator
- Known for: Runaway Sardine

Emma Lillian Brock (June 11, 1886 – August 17, 1974) was an American children's author and illustrator of over 30 children's books.

== Early life and career ==
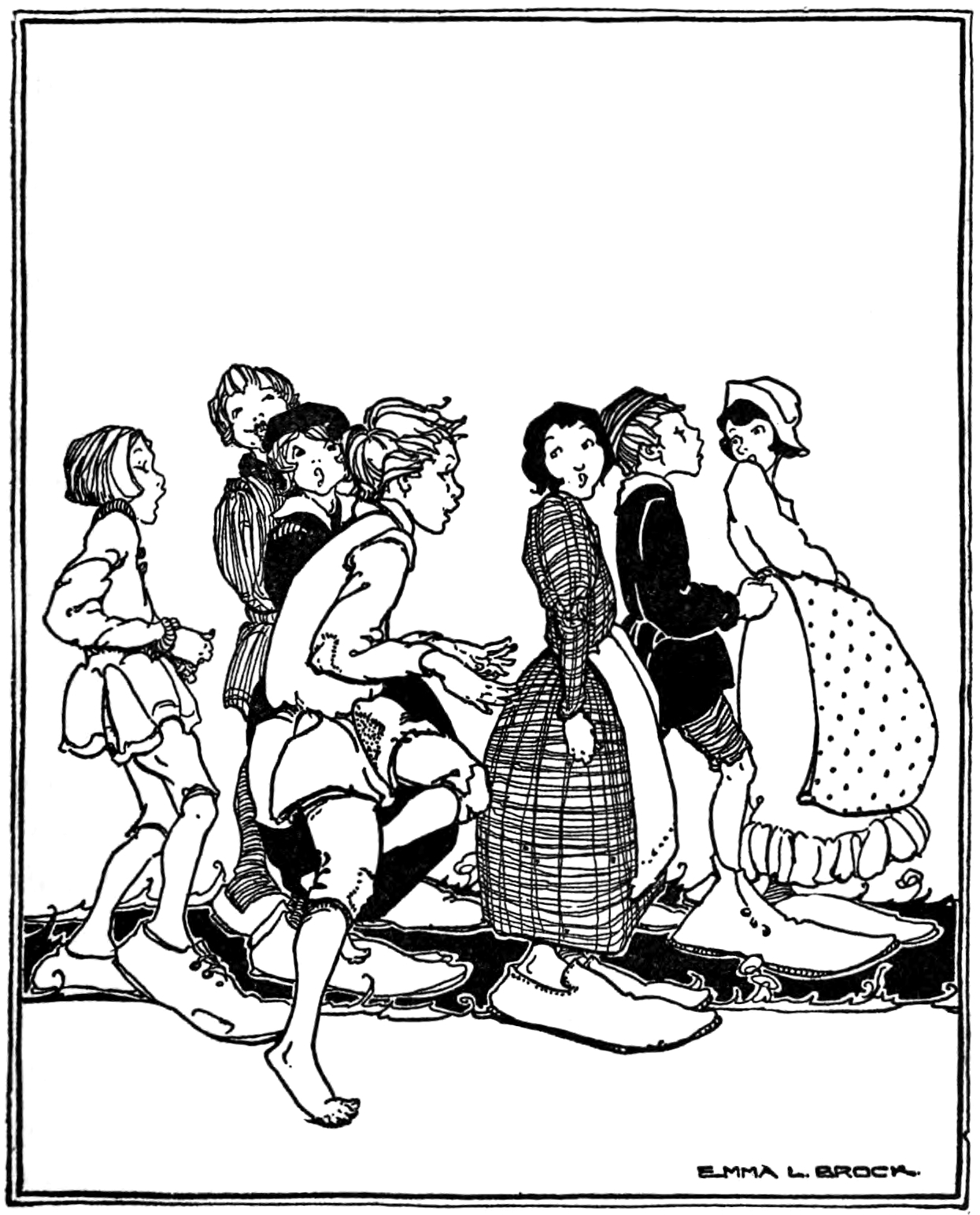
Fairyfoot and the Stumpinghame children (illustration by Emma L. Brock, from 1924 Macmillan edition of Granny's Wonderful Chair)

Brock was the eldest of two daughters born in Fort Shaw, Montana to Morton W. Brock and Emma Brownson. She attended The University of Minnesota (from which she obtained a Bachelor of Arts degree in 1908), the Minneapolis School of Fine Arts, and the Art Students League of New York, where she studied with George Bridgman, Boardman Robinson, and Joseph Pennell. During this period (from roughly 1909 through at least the mid-19-teens), Brock paid her way through art schools by working as a librarian in the Minneapolis and New York public library systems, respectively. In the former, she was with the art department, while in New York she served in the children's rooms.

Prior to the publication in 1929 of Runaway Sardine, the first book both written and illustrated by Brock (as well as her own personal favorite), Brock's professional debut as an illustrator came in 1922 with Clara Whitehill Hunt's adaptation of R. H. Horne's Memoirs of a London Doll.

Brooklyn Times columnist—and fellow children's author—Elsie Jean described Brock's 1929 authorial debut as "one of the loveliest picture books" of 1929, enjoyable from first page to last and ideal for ages 4 through 9, concluding, "I'm going to keep this one for my very own self, and I'm over nine!"

== Personal life and death ==
Brock died on August 17, 1974. Her remains are interred at Lakeside Cemetery, Hastings, Dakota County, Minnesota.

== Bibliography ==
- Runaway Sardine (1929) LCCN 29-14637
- To Market! To Market! (1930) LCCN 30-18300
- The Greedy Goat (1931) LCCN 31-18179
- One Little Indian Boy (1932) LCCN 32-19045
- The Hen That Kept House (1933) LCCN unk8-204186
- Little Fat Gretchen (1934) LCCN 34-31446
- Beppo (1936) LCCN 36-29596
- Drusilla (1937) LCCN 37-4881
- The Pig With a Front Porch and The Pig That Lived Under Half a Boat (1937) LCCN 37-28562
- Till Potatoes Grow on Trees : Nine Fine Retellable Tales (1938) LCCN 38-27264
- High in the Mountains (1938) LCCN 38-27363
- Nobody's Mouse (1938) LCCN 38-30383
- A Present for Auntie (1939) LCCN 39-16411
- Heedless Susan Who Sometimes Forgot to Remember (1939) LCCN 39-30530
- At Midsummer Time, A Story of Sweden (1940) LCCN 40-6807
- Too Fast for John (1940) LCCN 40-10078
- Then came Adventure (1941) LCCN 41-10975
- Here Comes Kristie (1942) LCCN 42-15602
- Topsy-Turvy Family (1943) LCCN 43-9802
- Mr. Wren's House (1944) LCCN 44-3685
- Uncle Benny Goes Visiting (1944) LCCN 44-6541
- The Umbrella Man (1945) LCCN 45-3160
- The Bird's Christmas Tree (1946) LCCN 46-6853
- Little Duchess, Anne of Brittany (1948) LCCN 48-7494
- Surprise Balloon (1949) LCCN 49-8188
- Kristie and the Colt : And the Others (1949) LCCN 49-10331
- Three Ring Circus (1950) OCLC 1612853
- Too Many Turtles (1951) LCCN 51-11073
- Kristie's Buttercup (1952) LCCN 52-6388
- Kristie Goes to the Fair (1953) LCCN 53-7626
- Ballet for Mary (1954) LCCN 54-7709
- Plug-Horse Derby (1955) LCCN 55-8947
- Come On-Along, Little Fish (1956) LCCN 57-5254
- Skipping Island (1958) LCCN 58-9939
- Patty on Horseback (1959) LCCN 59-12569
- Pancakes and the Merry-Go-Round (1960) LCCN 60-13024
- The Plaid Cow (1961) LCCN 61-15309
- Mary's Secret (1962) LCCN 62-14766
- Mary's Camera (1963) LCCN 63-9116
- Good Old Kristie (1964) LCCN 63-9579 (illustrated by Frank Aloise)
- Mary Makes a Cake (1964) LCCN 64-20170
- Mary on Roller Skates (1967) LCCN 67-18592

Brock also illustrated children's books by other authors, such as Sandy's Kingdom by Mary Gould Davis, The Wise Little Donkey by the Countess of Segur, and Granny's Wonderful Chair by Frances Browne.
