= McBain =

McBain may refer to:

== People with the surname ==
- Diane McBain (1941–2022), American actress
- Ed McBain (1926–2005), American author and screenwriter
- Edward McBain (died c. 1930), Scottish footballer
- Jack McBain (born 2000), Canadian ice hockey player
- James William McBain (1882–1953), Canadian chemist
- Jamie McBain (born 1988), American ice hockey player
- Laurie McBain (born 1949), American writer
- Laurie McBain (footballer) (1907–1937), Scottish footballer
- Lynn McBain, professor of general practice in New Zealand
- Roy McBain (born 1974), Scottish footballer
- Scott McBain (born 1960), Scottish fiction author

== In arts and entertainment ==
- McBain, character played by fictional actor Rainier Wolfcastle in the TV series The Simpsons
- McBain (film), 1991 action film

== Other uses ==
- Clan MacBain, highland Scottish clan
- McBain, Michigan, city in Missaukee County in the U.S. state of Michigan

== See also ==
- McBaine (disambiguation)
- McBane
