= McBane =

McBane is a surname. Notable people with the surname include:

- Donald McBane (1664–1732), Scottish swordsman
- Maria McBane (born 1946), American model and actress

== See also ==
- McBain (disambiguation)
- McLane
