= Granny's Wonderful Chair =

1857 book by Frances Browne

- Cover illustration by Marie Seymour Lucas, from 1890 edition
- Author: Frances Browne
- Original title: Granny's wonderful chair and its tales of fairy times
- Illustrator: Kenny Meadows
- Language: English
- Genre: Children's fiction
- Publisher: Griffith and Farran
- Publication date: 1857
- Publication place: England
- Text: Granny's Wonderful Chair at Wikisource

Granny's Wonderful Chair is a collection of fairy tales by Irish author Frances Browne (1816–1879), first published in an 1857 edition with illustrations by Kenny Meadows. It is Browne's best-known work. It concerns a poor, orphaned girl named Snowflower who has the ability to command her grandmother’s chair to tell stories and to carry her to different locations. Transported to the castle of King Winwealth, Snowflower asks the chair to tell a story each night for the amusement of the court. The seven fairy tales told by the chair make up the bulk of the book. The story is rounded off with "Prince Wisewit's Return", in which Snowflower is reunited with her grandmother. The book has been described as containing "some of the best original short fairy tales of its period". It was the subject of a claim of plagiarism, after Frances Hodgson Burnett published a fairy tale based on "The Story of Fairyfoot." The collection has been republished many times, and translated into several languages.

== Publishing history ==
The book was initially published by Griffith and Farran, printed in quarto size with illustrations by Kenny Meadows, and was sold for 3s. 6d. plain or 4s. 6d. coloured. Although this first edition bears "MDCCCLVII" on the title page, and so is often given the publication date 1857, it was in fact published shortly before Christmas 1856. The book was not republished until 1880, a year after Browne's death, as an eightpenny volume after which it was reprinted in 1881, 1882, 1883, 1884, 1887 and 1889, at which point the price was one shilling. Editions of Granny's Wonderful Chair have been illustrated by a number of notable artists, including Marie Seymour Lucas (1890), Dora Curtis (1906), Katharine Pyle (1916), Arthur A. Dixon (1917), Emma Brock (1924), and Florence White Williams (1928). In the 1920s and 1930s, New Zealand publisher Whitcombe and Tombs published a version of the book in their graded reader series, where they recommended it for ages 8 to 9 years. In 1932, the entire book was included in Sylvia Lynd's The Children's Omnibus, and again when that volume was republished in 1959 as the Gollancz Golden Treasury of Stories for Boys and Girls. In 1963, an edition illustrated by Denys Watkins-Pitchford was published by J. M. Dent and E. P. Dutton, and in 1985 a Puffin Classic unillustrated edition was released. Granny's Wonderful Chair has been translated into several languages, including a 2013 Chinese edition.

Some of the individual stories have been included in story collections. "The Story of Fairyfoot" was anthologised in Charles Madison Curry's 1921 Children's literature: a textbook of sources for teachers and teacher-training classes, and again in The Oxford Book of Modern Fairy Tales in 1993. "The Story of Childe Charity" was included in A Child's book of stories from many lands (1988), as well as the fourth volume of The Field Day Anthology of Irish Writing, published in 2002. "The Christmas Cuckoo" has appeared in Wilhemina Harper's Merry Christmas to You (1961), The Faber book of Christmas stories (1984), and Christmas fairy tales (1996).

== Plot ==
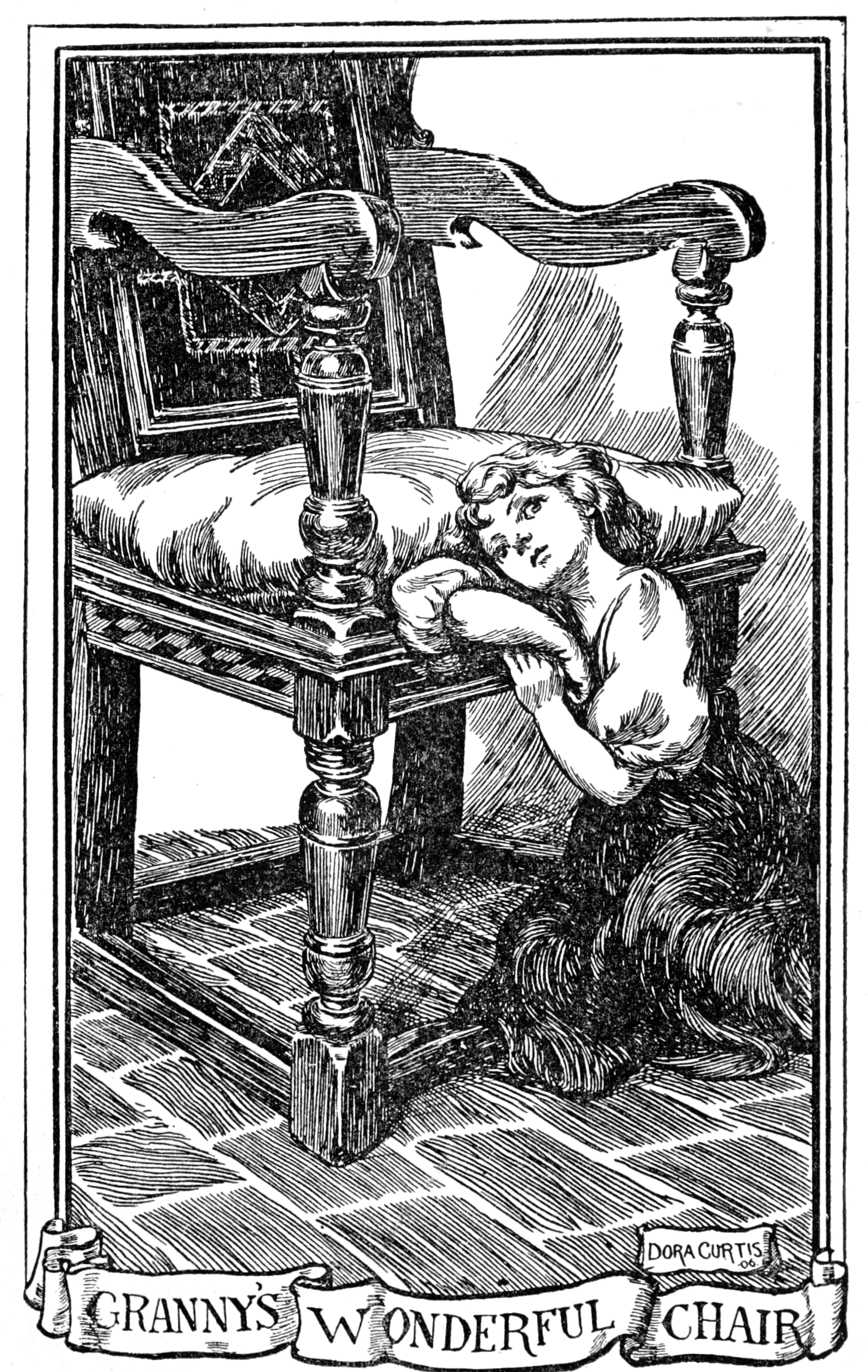
Illustration by Dora Curtis from 1906 Everyman edition

=== Introductory ===
In a time "when the fairies were in the world," a little girl named Snowflower lives with her grandmother, Dame Frostyface, in a peat cottage on the edge of a forest. The pair are very poor, and the only good piece of furniture they own is an armchair with carvings on its back and wheels on its feet. During the day, Dame Frostyface sits in the chair and spins yarn, but in the evening, she entertains Snowflower with stories. One day Dame Frostyface announces that she must make a journey to the north country to see her aunt. She tells Snowflower that, when she feels lonely, she should lay her head on the armchair and say, "Chair of my grandmother, tell me a story." If she ever needs to travel, a similar command will compel the chair to carry her to any destination. The chair entertains the little girl with a tale each evening, but eventually Snowflower runs low on provisions and asks the chair to take her to her grandmother. During the journey, Snowflower stops the chair when they come upon some woodcutters hard at work. She learns that King Winwealth is preparing seven days of festivities to celebrate the birthday of his daughter Princess Greedalind. Intrigued and hungry, Snowflower asks the chair to take her to King Winwealth’s palace. The narrator explains that the city was once happily ruled by both King Winwealth and his brother Prince Wisewit. But Wisewit had disappeared, and the king had married a selfish princess named Wantall. Since Wisewit’s disappearance, the people had become discontented and covetous.

The king allows Snowflower to stay, but only in the palace’s worst kitchen, where she might eat scraps. When the festivities begin on the following day, the king finds himself in low spirits. So he calls on Snowflower to come to the banquet hall and asks her chair to tell a story. Before an amazed crowd, the chair tells the story of the Christmas Cuckoo.

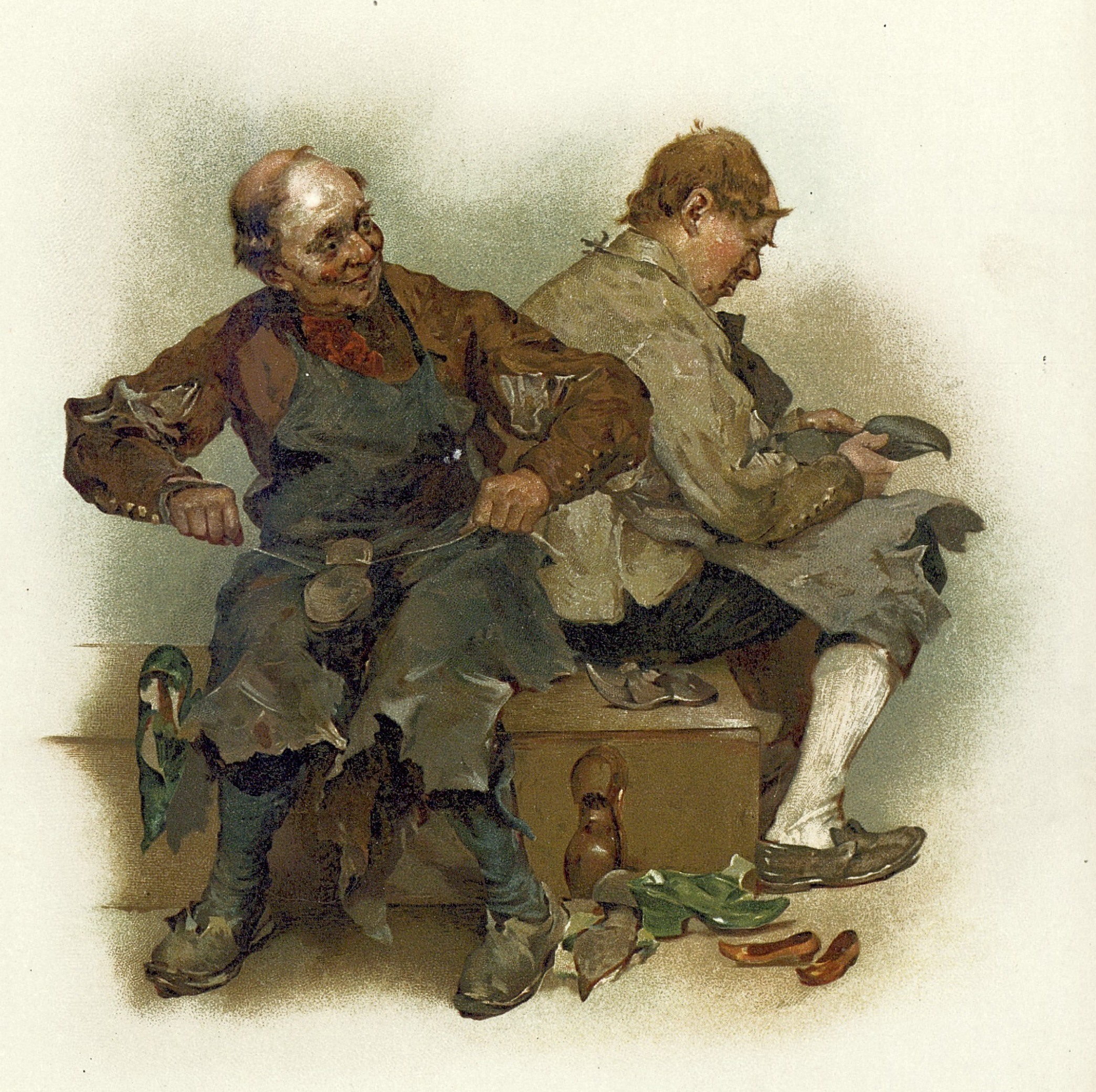
"They mended the shoes of lords and ladies", a colour illustration by Marie Seymour Lucas from 1890 Griffith and Farran edition

=== The Christmas Cuckoo ===
One snowy Christmas, two poor cobbler brothers named Scrub and Spare kindly shelter a hungry cuckoo in their old hut. The bird rewards their hospitality by offering to bring them, each spring, a leaf from one of two magical trees at the world’s end, the tree of gold and the merry tree. Scrub asks for a leaf from the tree of gold while Spare asks for a leaf from the merry tree, which promises happiness. Scrub becomes rich from the gold leaf and marries the maid Fairfeather, but they are never content. By contrast, Spare happily retains his humble ways, living in the old hut, and those who spend time with him become happier. News of Spare’s benevolent powers reaches the king, who summons Spare to the palace. Learning of Spare’s royal attention, Scrub and Fairfeather set off for the palace, certain that it is their destiny to become a lord and lady. At court Spare loses his leathern doublet which contains his merry leaves. The doublet had been picked up by a dwarf named Spy, who later assists his witch mother in robbing Scrub and Fairfeather in the forest. Unaware of the merry leaves, Spy leaves them the doublet. When Scrub puts it on, the merry leaves work their magic. He and Fairfeather decide to make a home in the forest where they rediscover simple joys. Spare, searching for his lost doublet, comes upon Scrub and Fairfeather. The three return to the old hut, where the cuckoo visits them every first of April, “bringing three leaves of the merry tree—for Scrub and Fairfeather would have no more golden ones.”

In thanks for the chair’s story, the King grants Snowflower “a pair of scarlet shoes with buckles of gold.” The following night, the King, again falling into low spirits, requests another tale. The chair announces that it will tell the story of Lady Greensleeves.

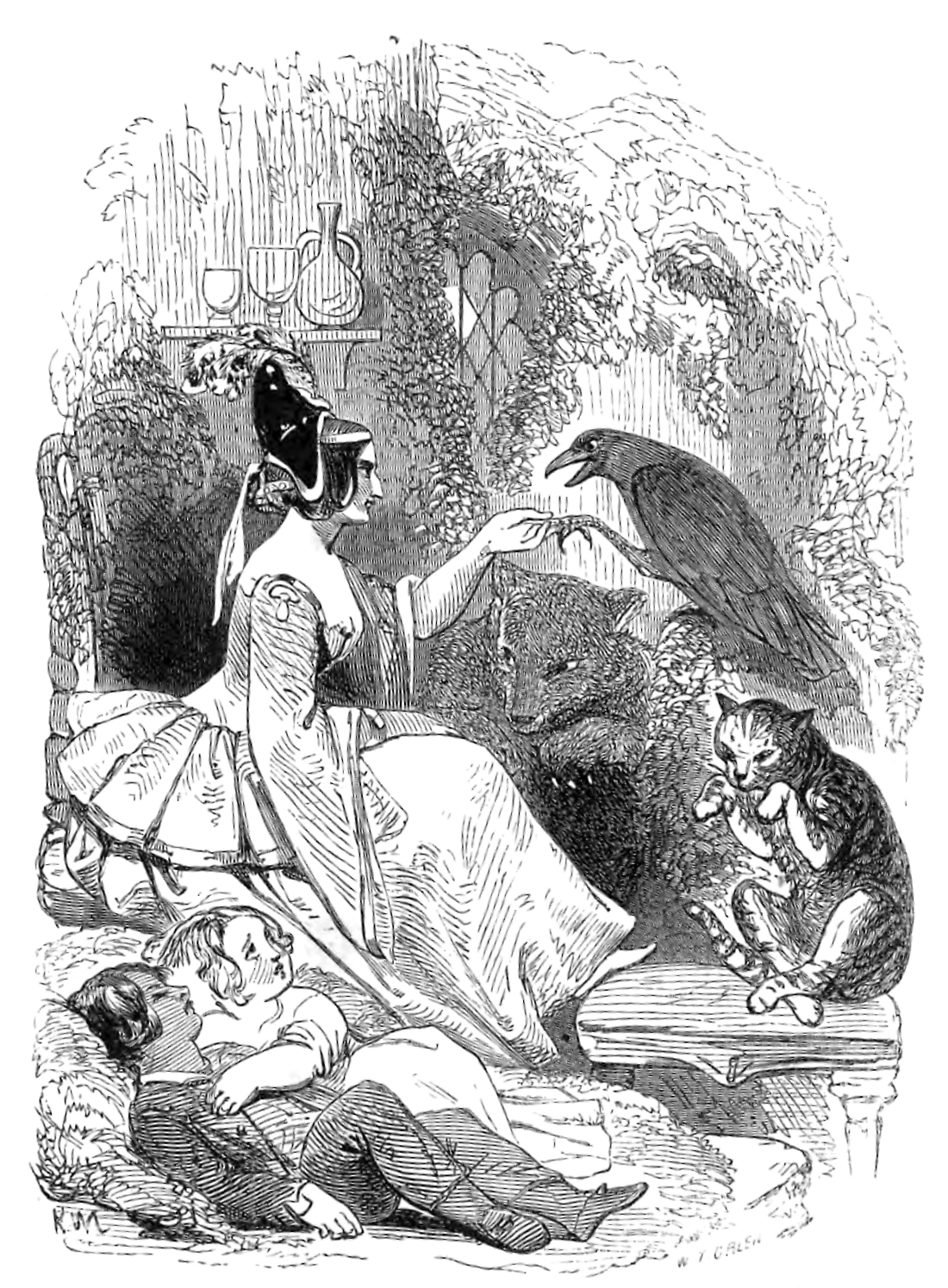
Lady Greensleeves speaking with the forest creatures (illustration by Kenny Meadows from 1857 first edition)

=== The Lords of the White and Grey Castles (also called Lady Greensleeves) ===
Two lords in neighbouring castles look forward to a time when their children, Woodwender and Loveleaves, will marry. One day a traveler tells them of a remarkable woman in the forest who weaves her own grey hair into cloths. The lords journey into the forest to find the woman, leaving their stewards to care for their children and their estates. As the length of the lords' absence increases, the selfish stewards lavish their own children with the lords' riches and send Woodwender and Loveleaves off to tend a herd of swine. While searching for two missing hogs, the children get lost in the forest. A green path leads to a peaceful dell where they meet Lady Greensleeves, who invites them to live with her in a great oak tree. One day, as forest creatures report the news to Lady Greensleeves, Loveleaves overhears a raven explain that the king of the forest fairies has cast a spell over their fathers, who now spend all their time planting acorns. Lady Greensleeves tells the children where to find their parents. Following the lady’s advice, they avoid three temptations of the fairies. A raven, in thanks for their kindness, tells them how to rescue their fathers: just before sunset, they must describe the stewards' bad behaviour, and then hide away their fathers' spades. The spell is broken, and all return to the castles where order is restored. Woodwender and Loveleaves eventually marry and unite the lands.

In thanks for the chair's story, the King grants Snowflower white silk hose and a mattress. The following night, the King requests another tale. The chair announces that it will tell the story of the Greedy Shepherd.

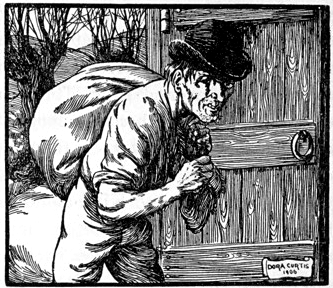
Clutch returns with his sack (illustration by Dora Curtis from 1906 edition)

=== The Greedy Shepherd ===
Two shepherd brothers, Clutch and Kind, live in the south country. As their names suggest, Clutch is always concerned with making a profit, while Kind "would have shared his last morsel with a hungry dog." In order to increase profits, Clutch decides to shear his sheep more often, leaving the sheep cold and his good-hearted brother unhappy. The closely cropped sheep begin to stray from the herd until none remain. The brothers follow the sheep into the rocky hills. After a day of walking they reach the top, where they encounter thousands of sheep and an ancient shepherd playing his pipe. The old man offers the brothers plentiful food and work shearing. After the moon appears, the old man calls "a troop of shaggy wolves" and orders Clutch to shear them. Frightened, Clutch refuses, but Kind takes up the shears and gets to work. The ancient shepherd rewards him with the flock of wolves, which magically change "into the very sheep which had strayed away so strangely." They return to the plain, "where Clutch has grown less greedy, and Kind alone uses the shears."

In thanks for the chair’s story, the King grants Snowflower a white satin gown, and she moves to the best kitchen. The following night, the King again requests a tale. The chair announces that it will tell the story of Fairyfoot.

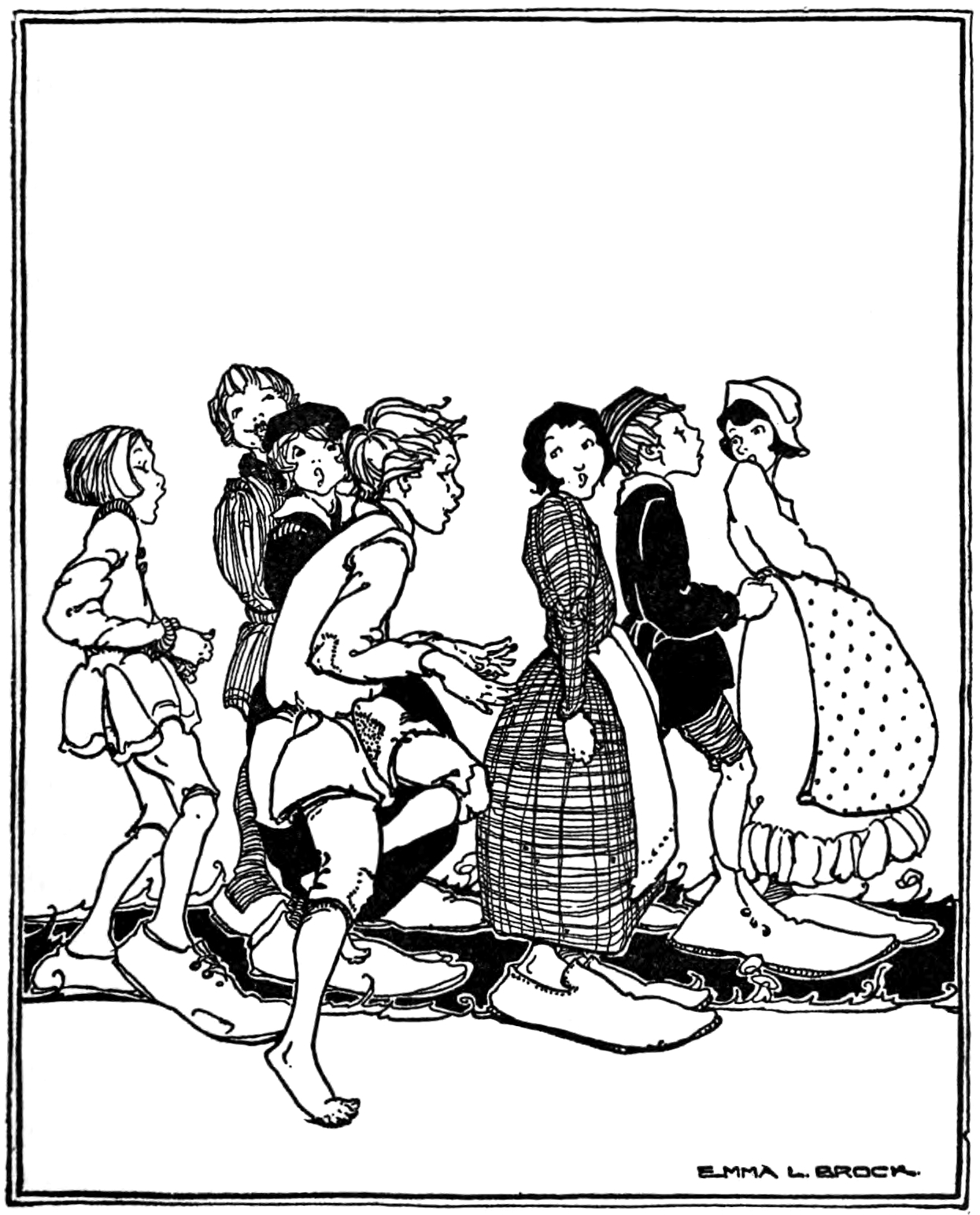
Fairyfoot and the Stumpinghame children (illustration by Emma L. Brock, from 1924 Macmillan edition)

=== The Story of Fairyfoot ===
In the town of Stumpinghame enormous feet had been the fashion from time immemorial. When the Queen’s seventh son is born with tiny feet, the whole court goes into mourning. The boy is banished to a shepherd’s family and named Fairyfoot. One day, while tending sheep, he saves a robin from a hawk. The robin, Robin Goodfellow, is actually a little man in disguise, and he bids Fairyfoot call his name if ever he needs help. Shunned by all and lonely, one day Fairyfoot calls and follows Robin Goodfellow to his land in the forest. Every night all that summer, when the shepherds are gone, the little man takes him away to the fairies, where all is music, feasting, and dancing. While resting, Fairyfoot overhears “two little ladies clad in green” admiring his handsome feet, saying that they were just like Princess Maybloom’s before she washed hers in the Growing Well. They also speak of a Fair Fountain which could make her feet fine and small again; but only they and the nightingales know the secret whereabouts of this fountain. Fairyfoot is amazed and determines to find the princess. The nightingales reveal the way, and he gains the King’s permission to escort Princess Maybloom to the Fair Fountain. There, she washes her feet, and they become as small and fine as Fairyfoot’s own. In gratitude the princess shows Fairyfoot the Growing Well. He fears that if he changes his feet he will no longer be able to dance. So the happy couple, for married they were in time, visit the Growing Well before visiting Stumpinghame, and secretly visit the Fair Fountain when they return.

In thanks for the chair’s story, Snowflower receives a pearl necklace, a down pillow, and dines on a roast chicken. The following night, in response to the King's request, the chair announces that it will tell the story of Childe Charity.

"Fairy chariot", from The Story of Childe Charity, illustrated by Emma Brock, 1929 MacMillan edition

=== The Story of Childe Charity ===
The orphan girl Childe Charity lives with her rich farmer uncle and his family. Treated with disdain, she is made to scrub and clean all day. On the evening of the Harvest supper, a poor old beggar woman arrives at the house. Childe Charity takes her in, giving her her food and her bed in the garret. This continues for eight nights. On the ninth night the beggar woman departs on a long journey and asks the little girl to look after her “ugly ashy-coloured dog.” Though her “proud cousins wanted him drowned,” Childe Charity cares for the dog. One night the parlour maid sees a dazzling procession of elegant little men and ladies arriving in the garret. They address the dog as royalty, and he instructs them to prepare the feast and robes for a special guest. The maid conveys this to Childe Charity’s aunt, who ridicules her, but observes the same spectacle, with the dog instructing the subjects to prepare jewels and presents. The aunt tells her husband, who laughs, but also witnesses the event, this time with the little people being instructed to prepare horses and chariots. The uncle concludes that these are fairies. On the shortest day of the year, the old beggar woman returns. A great procession arrives, and the beggar woman and dog transform into the beautiful princess and handsome prince of Fairyland, who had come in disguise to settle a wager to see if there existed any good people. Childe Charity travels with them into their resplendent land where she feasts and is adorned with beautiful robes, jewels and a chariot. She returns to the farmhouse, becomes a great lady, and never toils again.

In thanks for the chair’s story, the King grants Snowflower a crimson velvet hat, and she goes down to the housekeeper’s parlour. The feast continues in the palace with cattiness and din. The following night, the chair tells the story of Sour and Civil.

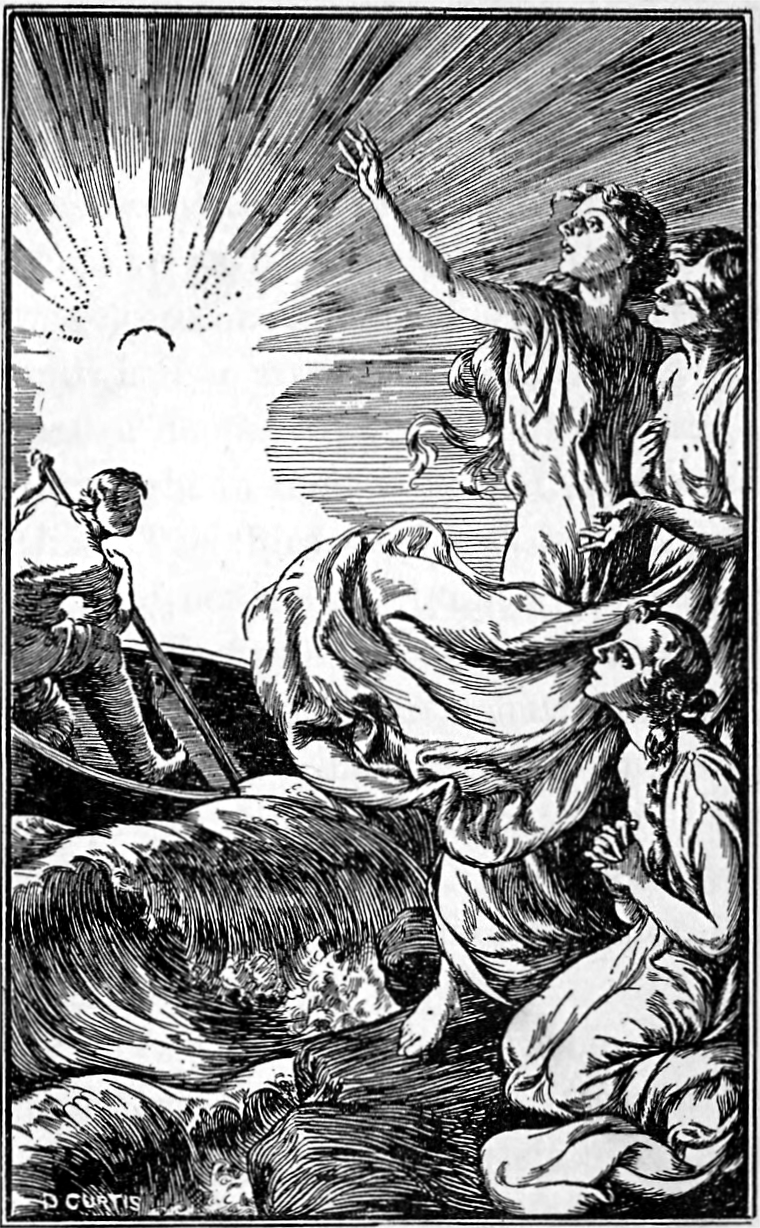
Civil and the three sea maidens, illustration by Dora Curtis 1906

=== Sour and Civil ===
Sour and Civil are strong and courageous fishermen with opposing personalities. One day their catch is so poor that they sail far out to Merman's Seat. All they catch is mackerel and an ugly fish with "a huge snout, a long beard and a skin covered with prickles." The fish, who has the power of speech, offers a daughter in marriage to Civil in a year's time. Sour tells his mother the story. She mocks Civil and connives to tell the whole village, resulting in each fisherman going his own way. Twelve months later, Civil is alone at Merman’s Rock and finds three fair ladies, two with strange bluish shades of hair and fiery looks in their eyes, and one who appears sad. His boat sinks into the sea and into a long cave with hills of marble and rocks of spar. Mermen and mermaids appear, each one with the same colourless face and wild light in their eyes. The chief merman—previously encountered as the ugly fish—shows Civil rooms filled with jewels and gold for his eldest daughters' dowries. Civil shuns the riches and chooses the third daughter, who is not the chief's real daughter but the sole survivor of a wrecked ship. She warns Civil not to take any of the sea people's belongings to the land or he will never be free of them. They cast the jewels aside and make their way to land, where their mothers are waiting. Sour and his mother are attracted to the prospect of riches and make their way to the sea kingdom, but they grumble and growl so much that even the sea-people grow weary of them and turn them out on the open sea.

In thanks for the chair's story, the King grants Snowflower a purple velvet mantle, and she moves to a chamber beside the lowest banqueting hall. The following night, the chair tells the story of Merrymind.

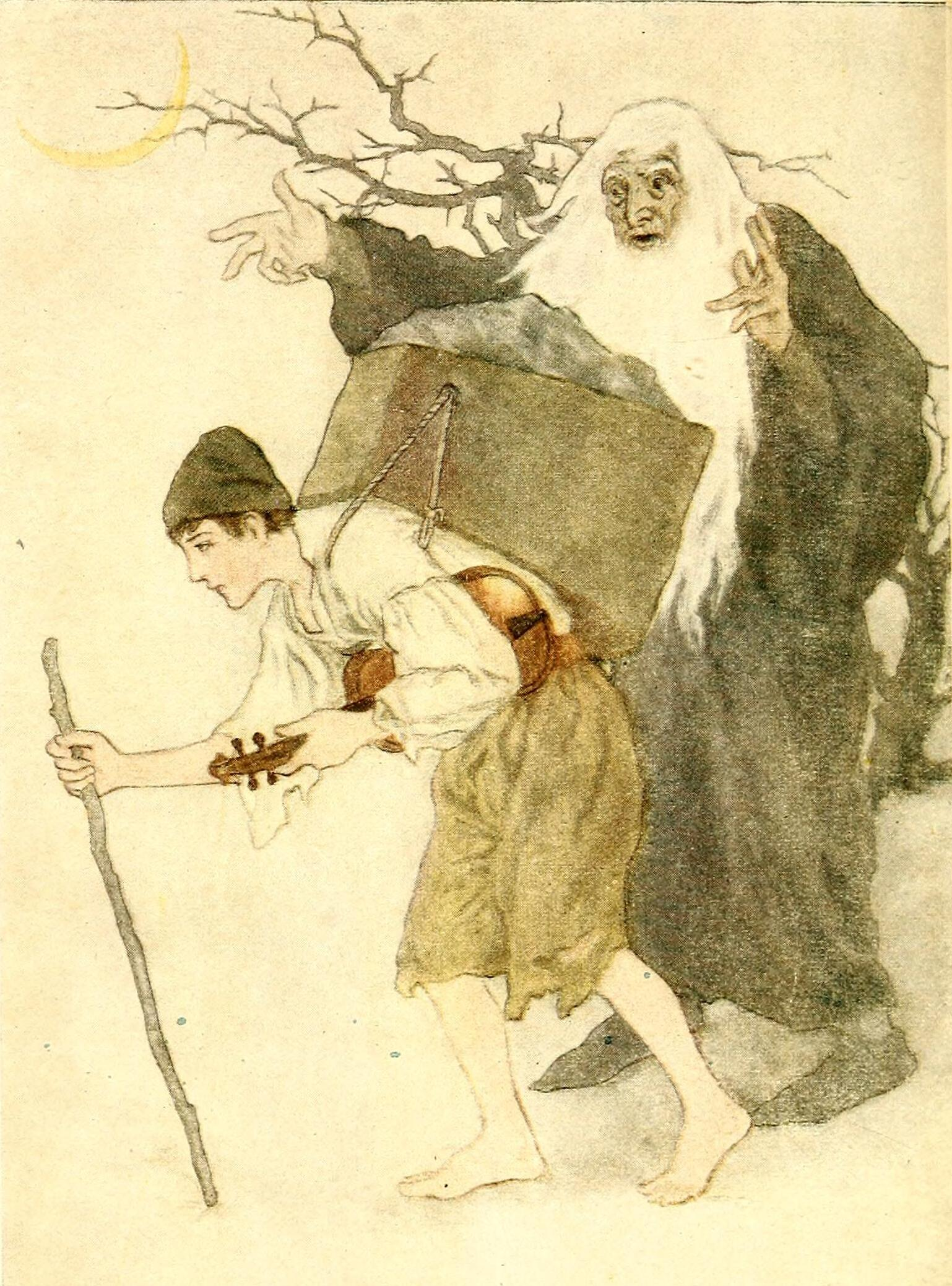
Merrymind and his burden, from 1916 edition edited and illustrated by Katharine Pyle

=== The Story of Merrymind ===
Merrymind is a humble boy from a large, poor family in the north country. At the great midsummer fair, he is eager to buy a fiddle but can't afford the finest ones. Instead, he buys a broken fiddle from a little, grey-haired man who explains that it can only be mended with special threads spun in the darkness of night. Merrymind attempts to repair the fiddle himself, but no matter what he does, the strings won’t hold. Feeling scorned by his family and neighbours, he decides to leave home and seek his fortune. His journey takes him through a wild, misty valley where he meets a huge old man with a dust-laden pannier. Merrymind helps the man by carrying his pannier. In gratitude, the old man gives Merrymind a place to sleep. Merrymind learns that he is in a cheerless land ruled by Dame Dreary, an evil lady who had once been joyful but is now cursed to work endlessly, her land drained of life and colour. Merrymind ventures into a deserted cottage and, with the help of the mysterious night-spinners (fairy-like maidens who spin golden threads at night), he repairs his fiddle. When he plays, his music affects everyone. The villagers stop working and come to dance, and Dame Dreary herself is transformed back into Lady Littlecare, a bright and cheerful person. As a reward, the king frees the soldier guarding the valley and promotes Merrymind to first fiddler, "which, under that wise monarch, was the highest post in his kingdom."

In thanks for the chair’s story, the King grants Snowflower a golden girdle, invites her to feast in the chief banqueting hall, and to "sleep in one of the best chambers of the palace."

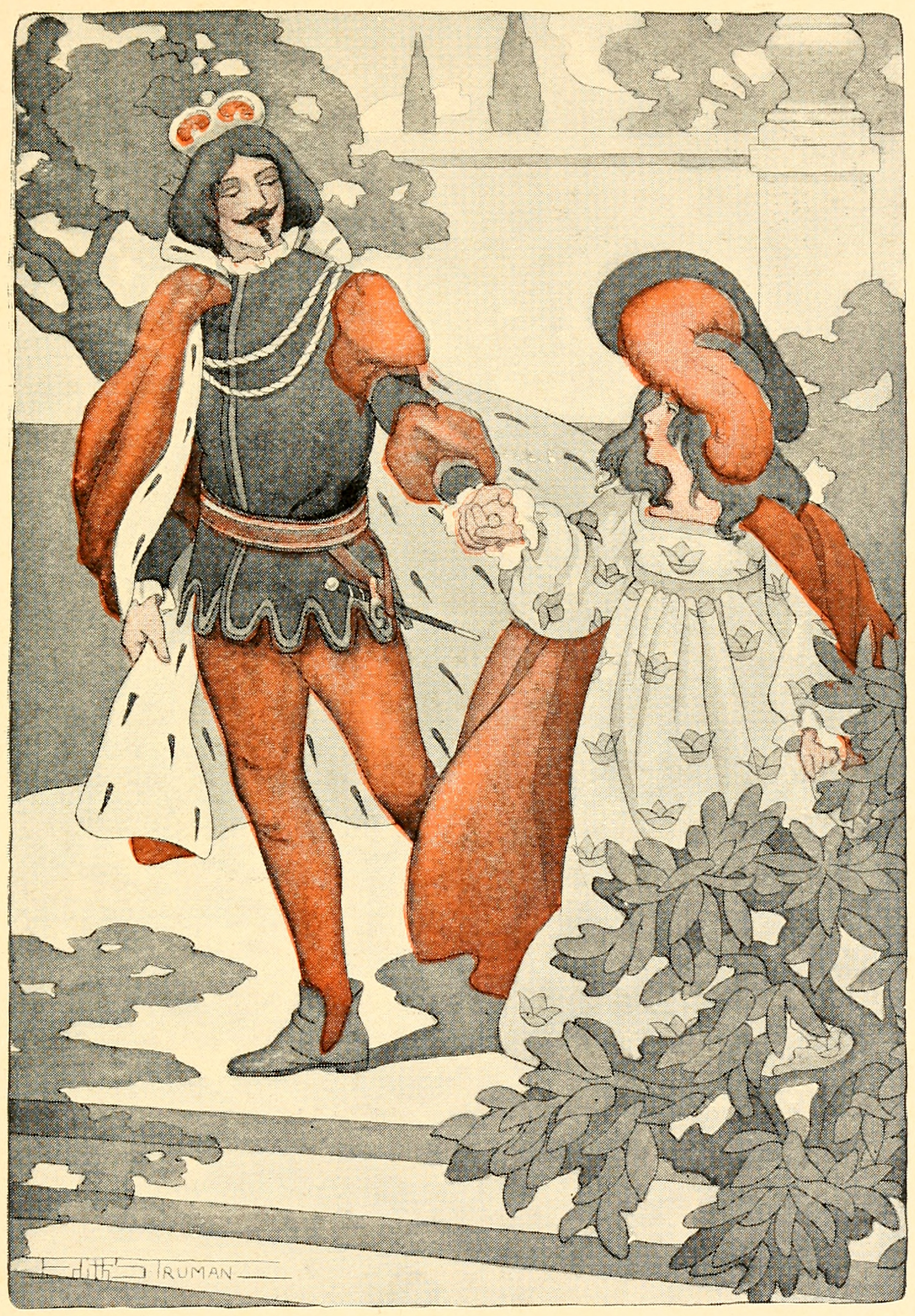
"Prince Wisewit went home leading Snowflower by the hand" (illustration by Edith Truman from the 1904 edition)

=== Prince Wisewit's Return ===
Almost everyone in the palace is pleased with the new privileges granted to Snowflower. The spoiled Princess Greedalind, however, is so jealous of Snowflower's beauty and popularity that she demands the chair for herself, but when Greedalind asks it to tell her a story it refuses and flings her to the ground. Her furious mother Queen Wantall calls for woodman Sturdy to chop it up for firewood, but at the first strike of the axe the cushion splits open and a white bird flies out. The entire company chase the bird, which flies over the palace gardens and into a wild common where the Queen and Princess fall into some deep pits that the Queen herself had previously commanded to be dug in the hope of discovering gold. The bird disappears, and in its place stands Prince Wisewit in a magical crown of gold and forest leaves. They all hail their beloved Prince, who leads them back to the palace, recounting how he had been turned into the bird and trapped inside the cushion by the cunning Fairy Fortunetta. Meanwhile, the Queen and Princess have landed on some soft sand which they believe is gold. They ask the King to send them pickaxes to mine it, and they stay there forever more. In their absence, the delighted King is free to restore peace and justice throughout the land, and the people are again prosperous and happy. Snowflower’s Grandmother Dame Frostyface returns, and Snowflower becomes the new royal Princess.

In a brief epilogue, the narrator explains that the magical events of past times are long gone, as the fairies dance no more. No living person knows what became of King Winwealth and his magical country, but some believe that Prince Wisewit has fallen under another spell, and that one day soon, it will be broken, and the Prince and the fairies will return, and make all things right with this world.

== Reception ==
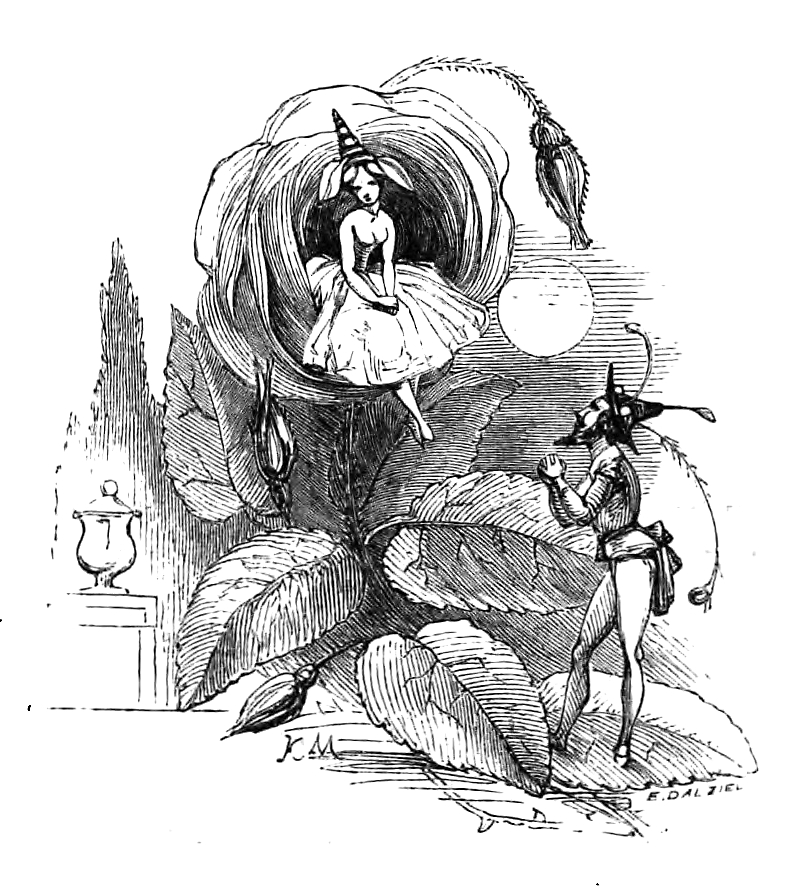
Illustration by Kenny Meadows of two fairies from the 1857 first edition

Granny’s Wonderful Chair received a number of favourable contemporary reviews. The 6 December 1856 Athenaeum found the fairy tales "extremely graceful" and observed "a dash of Germanism in them, which reminds us of the delicious tales of the Brothers Grimm." The reviewer named "The Story of Merrymind" as a personal favourite, but added, "[w]e like them all in their turn." Though Meadows’s illustrations were "pretty," his fairies were "too theatrical," appearing "as though they had gone through a course of 'deportment' from Mr. Turveydrop." The 9 December 1856 Morning Post, noting the illustrations "in Kenny Meadows' peculiar and well-known style," declared that the volume would "amply gratify that taste for fairy lore which is so strongly developed in children and young persons."

A slightly longer review appeared in The Art Journal for 1 January 1857. After commenting on Browne’s blindness ("Nature had … deprived her of this world's light, and bestowed upon her the light of poetry"), the reviewer distinguishes Browne’'s fairy tales from recent works by other Irish writers like Anna Maria Hall. "[A]lthough 'Frosty Face' and 'Fairy Foot' certainly belong to the 'Green Isle,' the settings of Browne’s tales only exist "on the pretty pages of this pretty book." The reviewer concludes that "no prettier Christmas gift could be imagined for a little lady about to enter her 'teens.'"

The continued popularity of Granny's Wonderful Chair is evidenced in a 1926 review of a new edition. “The book has been well known for so long a time it hardly seems necessary to speak of its merit. Reading it again, one wonders how the blind poet who wrote it could give her stories such a vivid background. Each scene is clearly described, with a wealth of word-pictures, which have a great appeal for young children." The Times Educational Supplement commented in 1963 that the book is "a classic for children sure of a continuing public as long as there are little people left to believe in fairyland". In 1985, the book was published as a Puffin Classic, with the introduction opining "This is a true classic, a treasury of magical and enthralling stories, and it's a book that deserves a place on every bookshelf." The Observer noted that the book was "too long out of print" and suitable for children aged 7 to 12 years "and other connoisseurs".

According to Humphrey Carpenter and Mari Prichard, the book "contains some of the best original short fairy tales of its period." It was described by Colin Manlove as "the first truly Christian Victorian fantasy" and "arguably one of the great works of Victorian fantasy". Whilst the stories are moralistic, this is not considered to be overt, and the pictorial quality of Browne's writing is often noted. Modern analysis of the book has focused on the portrayal of economic injustice in the stories, noting the themes of wealth, greed, and charity, and that the overarching story centres on poverty, with Snowflower forced to leave her home due to hunger. Other writers have attempted to frame the book within the fairytale tradition, and trace the influence of the book on other writers such as George MacDonald and Oscar Wilde.

== Plagiarism of Granny's Wonderful Chair ==
In 1886–87, the British-American writer Frances Hodgson Burnett published a fairy tale called "The Story of Prince Fairy Foot". It appeared over three issues of the American magazine for children St. Nicholas. A reader noticed that the story had been plagiarised from Browne's "The Story of Fairyfoot." The journal's editor, Mary Mapes Dodge, apologised, stating that Burnett said she remembered the story from her childhood but had been unable to find a copy of the source book. Dodge claimed that Burnett had intended the story to be the first of a series under the title "Stories from the Lost Fairy-Book, retold by the Child who Read Them", but that Dodge had omitted that title. Burnett was criticised in the British press for apparently failing to find a book that had been reprinted four times between 1881 and 1884. Seventeen years later, in 1904, and shortly after the work was out of copyright, Burnett wrote an introduction for a new edition of Granny’s Wonderful Chair. Many more editions of the book would appear in the following decades.

== Adaptations ==
The 2025 Frances Browne Literary Festival in Ballybofey-Stranorlar featured four aerial performances of "The Tale of Merrymind" adapted by local writer Shirley Anne Godfrey and performed by the Fidget Feet Aerial Dance Theatre.

== Gallery ==
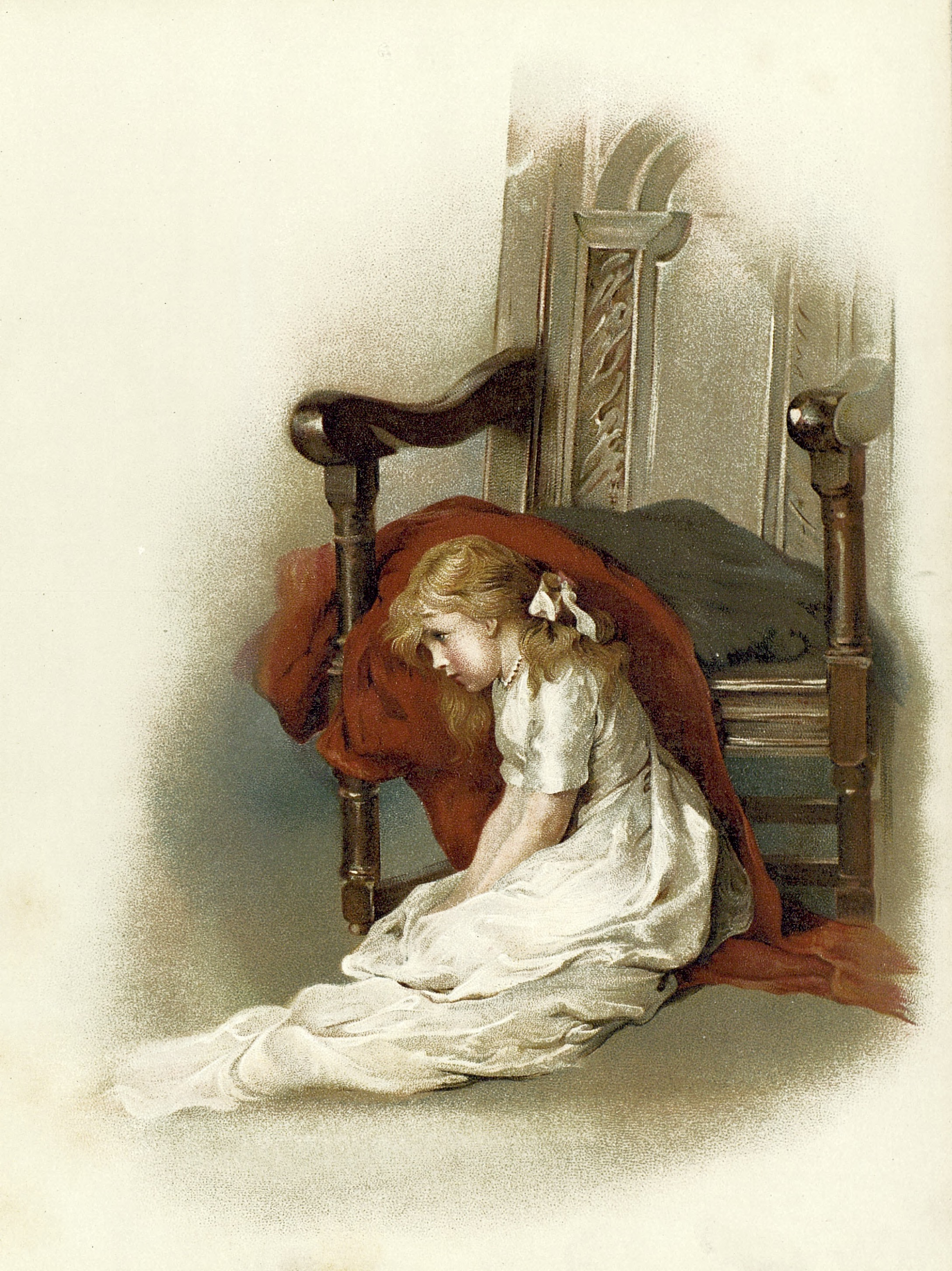
"Listen to the story", (Snowflower, from the Introductory, illustrated by Marie Seymour Lucas, 1890 Griffith and Farran edition)

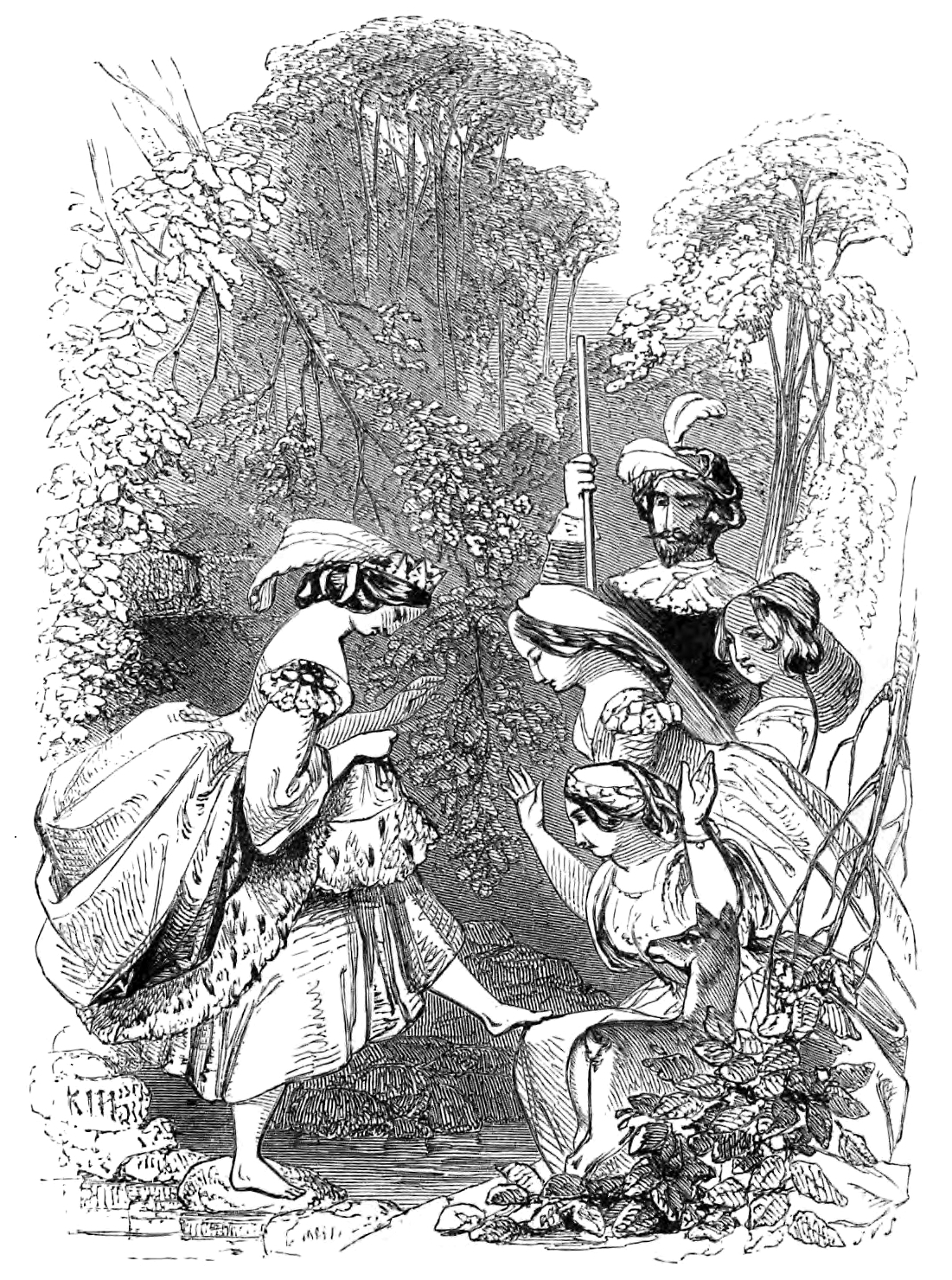
Princess Maybloom (from The Story of Fairyfoot, illustrated by Kenny Meadows, 1857 edition)

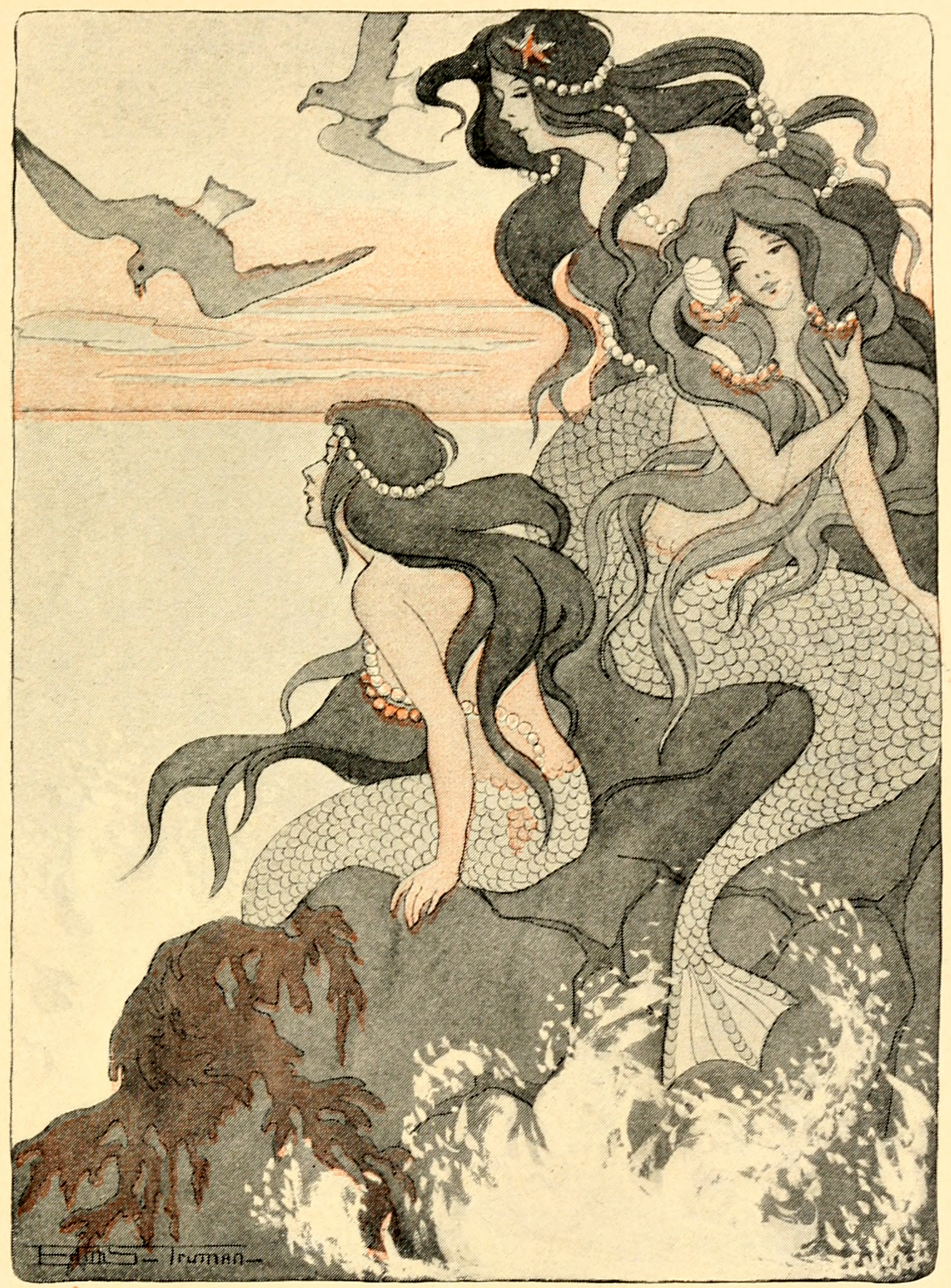
"Three fair ladies with sea-green gowns and strings of pearls wound round their long fair hair", (from Sour and Civil, illustrated by Edith Truman from the 1904 McClure, Phillips & Co edition)

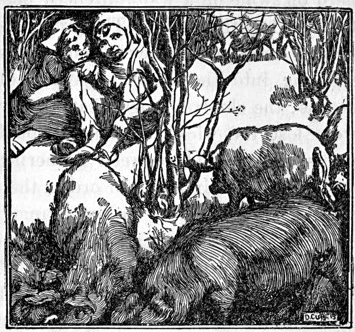
Woodwender and Loveleaves tend the swine (from The Lords of the White and Grey Castles, illustrated by Dora Curtis, 1906 Everyman's Library edition)

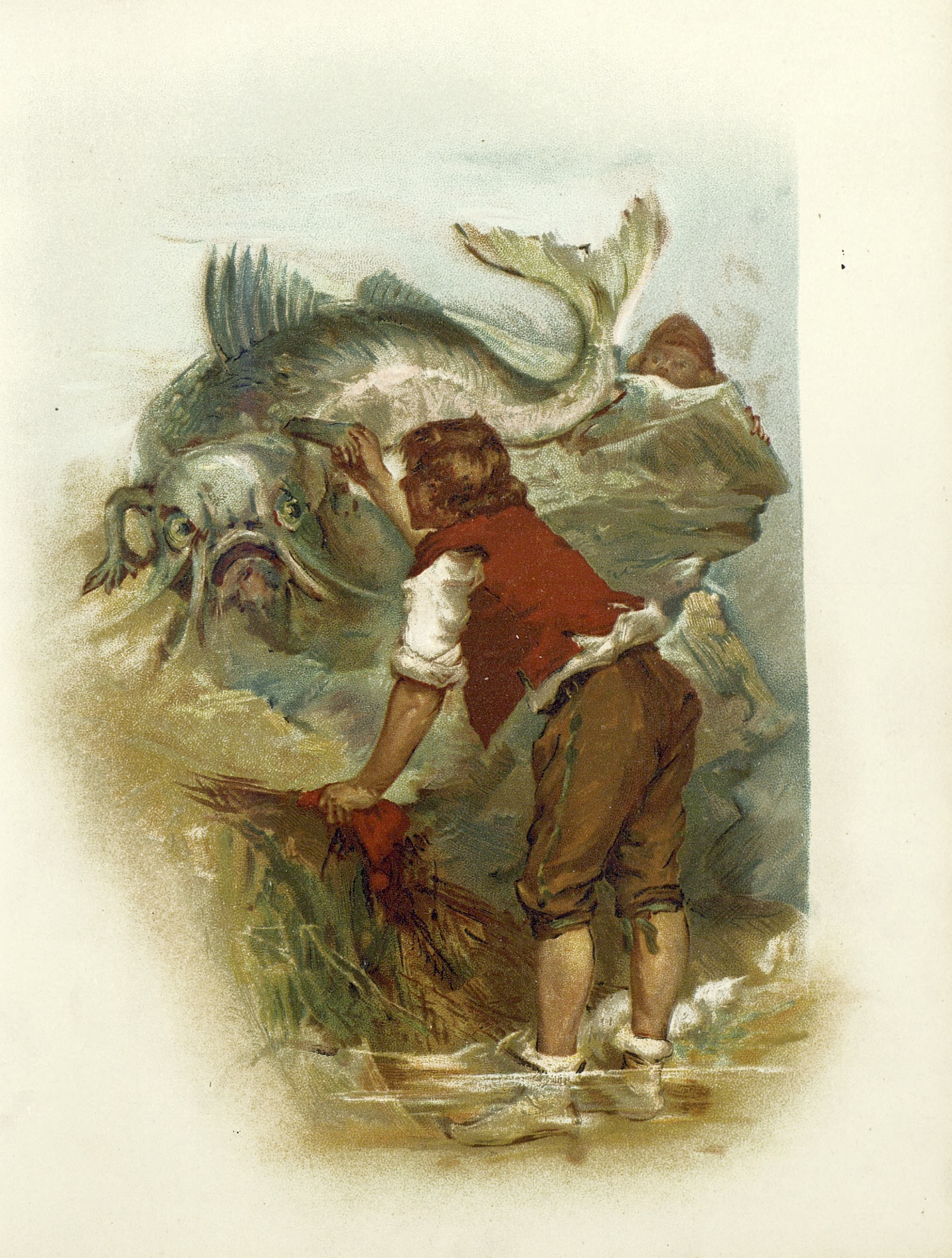
"Civil helped the great fish" (from Sour and Civil, illustrated by Marie Seymour Lucas, 1890 Griffith and Farran edition)

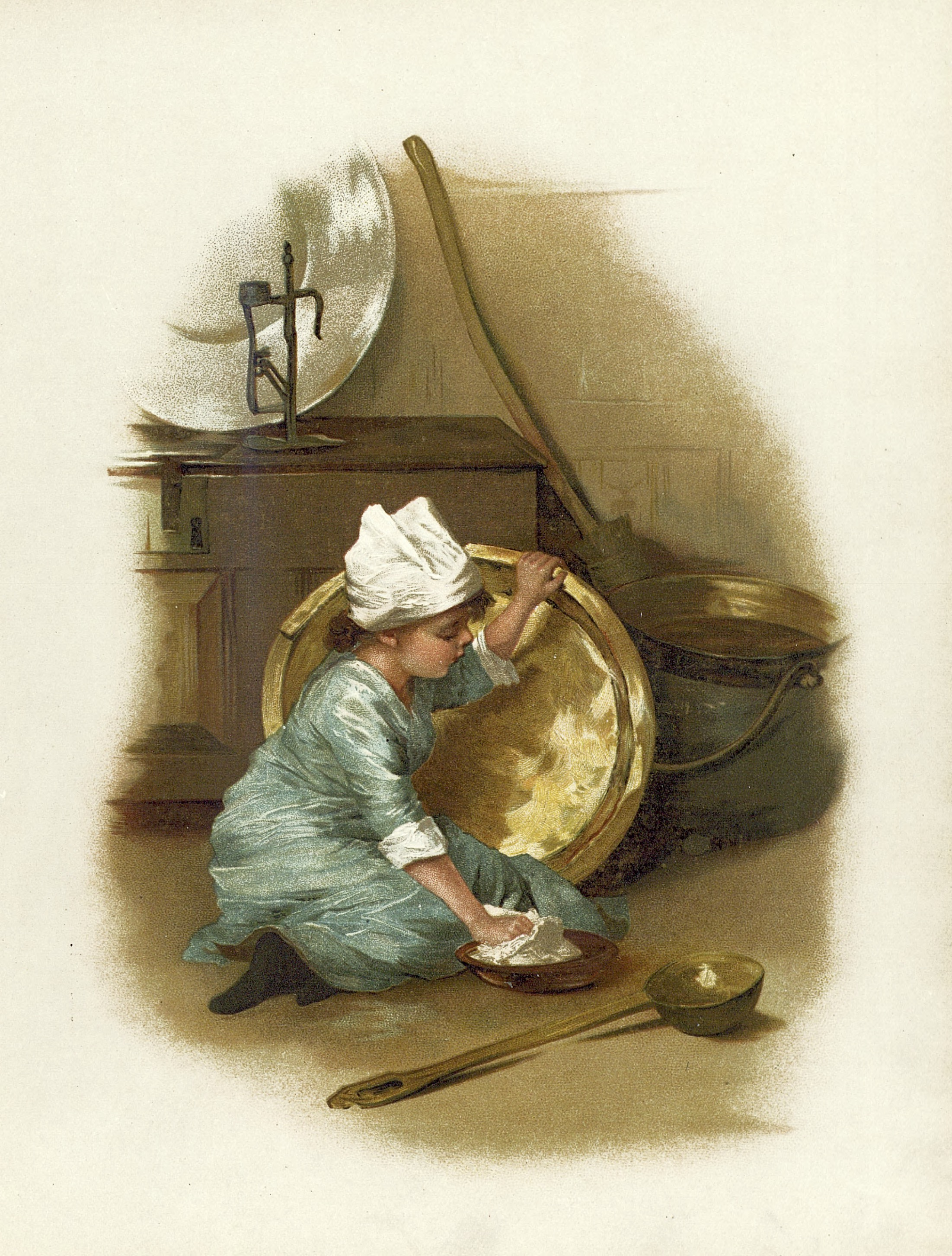
"She scoured pails" from Childe Charity, 1890 edition illustrated by Marie Seymour Lucas
