= McBaine =

McBaine may refer to:

- McBaine, Missouri, village in Missouri, United States
- Neylan McBaine, American blogger

== See also ==
- McBain (disambiguation)
