= Consider the Lilies =

Studio album by Mormon Tabernacle Choir
- Released: April 2021
- Length: 67:18
- Producer: Mack Wilberg, Barlow Bradford, Bruce Leek, Fred Vogler

Consider the Lilies is a religious album released by the Mormon Tabernacle Choir. The album was originally released in 2003. It was remastered in 2023 along with a release on vinyl. The music in this first album on the choir's new label represents a broad range of musical feeling—from the joyful "Rejoice, the Lord is King!" and "Morning Has Broken" to the contemplative "O Holy Jesus" and "Pilgrims' Hymn" to the fervent affirmations in "I Believe in Christ" and "This Is the Christ."

== Track listing ==
1. "For the Beauty of the Earth" (John Rutter) - 3:21
2. "O Holy Jesus" (Jonathan Willcocks) - 3:36
3. "Morning Has Broken" - 2:16
4. "As the Bridegroom to His Chosen" (Rutter) - 3:51
5. "I Sing the Mighty Power of God" (Mack Wilberg) - 2:18
6. "He Shall Feed His Flock" (John Ness Beck) - 3:10
7. "My Shepherd Will Supply My Need" - 4:52
8. "The Lord Bless You and Keep You" (Rutter) - 2:56
9. "I'm Trying to Be Like Jesus" (Janice Kapp Perry) - 4:38
10. "Rejoice, the Lord is King!" (Malcolm Archer) - 2:32
11. "Jesu, the Very Thought Is Sweet" (Wilberg) - 6:14
12. "Pilgrims' Hymn" (Stephen Paulus) - 3:35
13. "I Believe in Christ" (John Longhurst) - 4:54
14. "God! So Loved the World" (Carl J. Nygard, Jr.) - 4:10
15. "This Is the Christ" (Michael F. Moody) - 5:12
16. "For I Am Called by Thy Name" (Crawford Gates) - 1:58
17. "Consider the Lilies" (Roger Hoffman) - 5:18

== Personnel ==
- Craig D. Jessop – music direction
- John Longhurst – organ
- Clay Christiansen – organ
- Richard L. Elliott – organ
- Mormon Tabernacle Choir – chorus
- Orchestra at Temple Square – orchestra
- Ann Turner – choir manager
- Chris Acton – assistant engineer
- Barlow Bradford – associate director, producer
- Mac Christensen – choir president
- Scott Eggers – cover art direction
- Shauna Gibby – design
- Bruce Leek – producer, mastering, engineer, editing
- Milo Lefler – engineering support
- Alex Morris – stage manager
- Lynn Robinson – engineering support
- Gaylen Smith – engineering support
- Jim Turner – stage manager
- Fred Vogler – producer, engineer, editing
- Mack Wilberg – associate director, producer
- Wolfgang Zeisler – engineering support
