= Jane Alexander (swimmer) =

British swimmer

Personal information
- Full name: Jane Elizabeth Alexander
- Born: 13 December 1958 (age 67)
- Height: 162 cm (5 ft 4 in)
- Weight: 52 kg (115 lb)

Sport
- Sport: Swimming

Jane Elizabeth Alexander (born 13 December 1958) is a British former swimmer. She competed in two events at the 1976 Summer Olympics.

== Early life ==
She grew up in Willaston, Cheshire West, and trained with Everton SC. She moved to Cardiff, to be coached by Dave Haller.
