= Jane Alexander (author) =

Scottish novelist and designer born 1974

- Born: 1974 (age 51–52); Aberdeen
- Education: University of Edinburgh University of Glasgow Northumbria University
- Occupations: Lecturer, Creative Writing, Open University
- Writing career
- Genres: mid-grade, young adult, adult
- Notable work: The Last Treasure Hunt
- Notable awards: The Fiction Desk Ghost Story Competition, 2014
- Website: www.janealexander.net

Jane Alexander (born 1974) is a Scottish novelist, visual artist, illustrator, designer, and short story writer originally from Aberdeen.

== Life ==
Alexander studied Illustration at Edinburgh College of Art and completed a Master of Philosophy in Creative Writing at Glasgow University ten years later. She then pursued a PhD in Creative Writing at Northumbria University. She released her first novel The Last Treasure Hunt, which was published by Saraband Books in 2015 and is called a ‘a modern media morality tale’. Before her first novel, she has also written several short stories. Her short story 'In Yon Green Hill To Dwell' was the winner of The Fiction Desk Ghost Story Competition in 2014. Her stories range in audience age from mid-grade to adult. She is Deputy Programme Director, MSc in Creative Writing (Online) at the University of Edinburgh and associate lecturer in Creative Writing with the Open University.

Alexander is currently based in Edinburgh, where she has been living for the past twenty years. She is a member of the National Association of Writers in Education.

== Awards ==
- Scottish Arts Council (now Creative Scotland) New Writer’s Award, 2006
- Creative Scotland research grant, 2012
- The Fiction Desk Ghost Story Competition, 2014
- Current Creative Writing PhD research, funded by Northumbria University

== Bibliography ==
Short stories

- 'Candlemaker Row'
- 'In Yon Green Hill To Dwell'
- 'Now Here'
- 'Time-keeping In Public Places'
- 'Ninety-nine Tae Wan Against'

Novels

- Alexander, J. (2015). The Last Treasure Hunt. Saraband. ISBN 978-1-908643-80-3.
