= Kenny Meadows =

British artist and illustrator

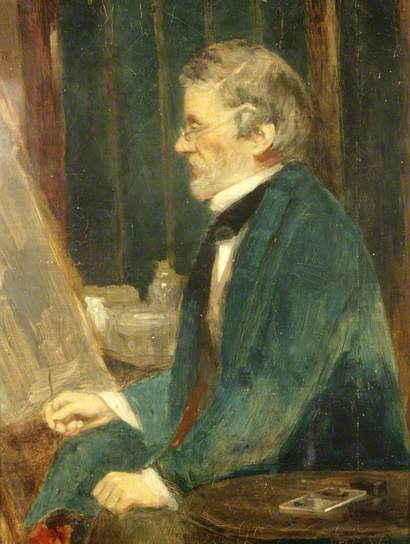
Portrait of Kenny Meadows, by his daughter Lucy

Joseph Kenny Meadows (November 1790–August 1874), better known as Kenny Meadows, was a British caricaturist and illustrator. He is best known for the drawings that he contributed to Punch and for his illustrations of scenes from Shakespeare's plays. Much of his work was drawn in a humorous bohemian style. He was well known for the quality of his illustrations, although the critical reception of his work was often mixed.

== Career ==
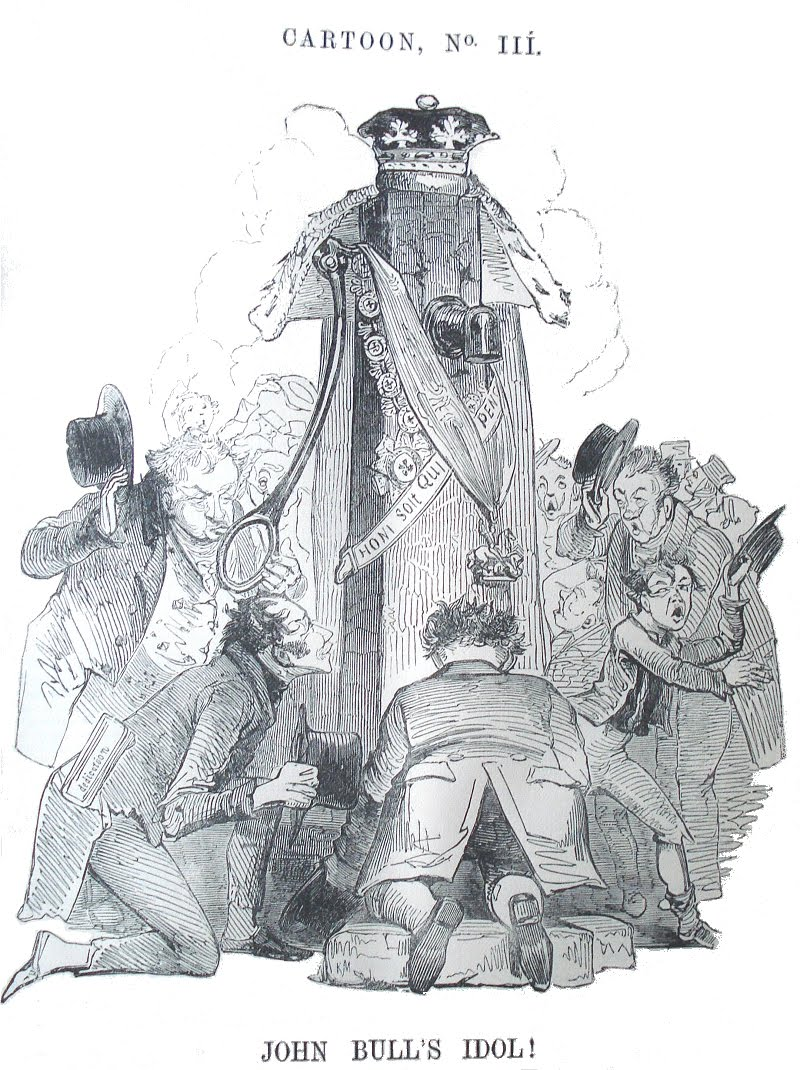
"John Bull's Idol" by Kenny Meadows. Published in 1843 in Punch

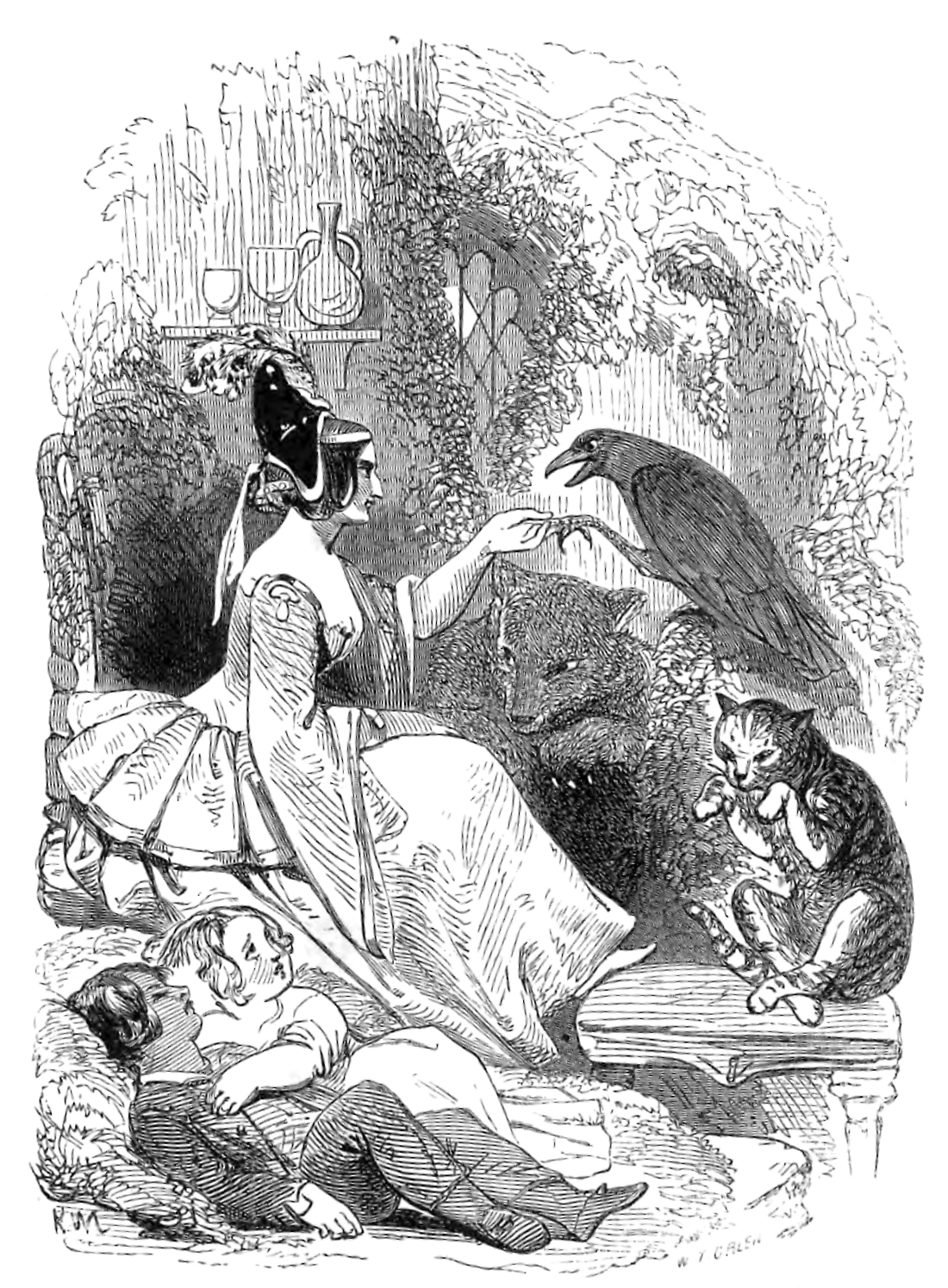
Lady Greensleeves speaking with the forest creatures (illustration by Kenny Meadows from 1857 first edition of Granny's Wonderful Chair)

Meadows' first major project was Heads of the People in 1840. His acquaintance with Douglas Jerrold allowed him to become the illustrator of the project. Other contributors to the book included William Makepeace Thackeray and Leigh Hunt. He also contributed to The Illuminated Magazine, which was edited by Jerrold as well. In addition, he drew several illustrations for the Christmas editions of Illustrated London News.

Meadows became a prominent artist due to his work for Punch. He contributed fourteen total drawings to the paper. They were published in 1843 and 1844, appearing in the first through the seventh volumes. He worked very closely with John Leech while they were employed there. At the time that he first began working for Punch he was one of its oldest contributors.

William Powell Frith once described him as "perhaps the best" of Punch's early illustrators. Other critics have stated that the quality of the work that he produced varied. His drawings were hailed by some commentators as more thoughtful than the typical burlesque treatments of the subjects of his drawings often received. Others have faulted his work for a lack of humour and inventiveness. He was often noted, however, for the youthful enthusiasm he had toward drawing.

His drawings often included the depiction of a butterfly at the mouth of a cannon, which symbolised peace. A similar design was used by Sir Edwin Henry Landseer in a painting, and some have attributed this similarity to Meadows' influence on Landseer.

Meadows often read Shakespeare and memorised many passages. He published a volume of illustrated scenes from Shakespeare in 1843. Though he and several of his friends considered this work to be his masterpiece, some reviewers criticised his interpretations of several characters. It was particularly well received in Germany, however. He continued working on depictions of scenes from Shakespeare for his entire life.

== Personal life ==
Meadows was the son of a Naval officer and was born in Cardigan. Although his first name was Joseph, he listed his name as Kenny Meadows in professional use. He lived in Camden Town for much of his life. He was married to the sister of Archibald Henning, a fellow artist who contributed to Punch. Meadow's wife was very frugal, and he allowed her to run the household's finances. Their niece Margaret married James Hannay, who wrote for Punch in the 1850s.

Meadows, who was known to be very outgoing and a night owl, spent much of his time visiting with friends and drinking gin. He was a friend of many prominent writers, including Charles Dickens, Henry Vizetelly and William Godwin.
