= Iain McDowall =

British crime fiction author

Iain McDowall is a British crime fiction author. He has written seven novels in his 'Crowby' series, featuring the present-day investigations of Inspector Jacobson and his team of provincial police detectives. The Crowby novels broadly follow the conventions of the police procedural but they are distinguished by an unusual narrative emphasis on the point of view of their non-police protagonists. McDowall's books are frequently concerned with controversial social and political themes. Since 2007, his books, in translation, have also achieved success in Germany.

McDowall was born in Kilmarnock, Scotland. He lives in the English Midlands where his novels are chiefly located. Before embarking on a writing career, he was a university teacher and researcher.

== Novels ==
- A Study in Death (2000)
- Making A Killing (2001)
- Perfectly Dead (2003)
- Killing For England (2005)
- Cut Her Dead (2007)
- Envy The Dead (2009)
- The Evil Thereof (2014)
