= Frances Browne =

Irish poet and novelist (1816–1879)

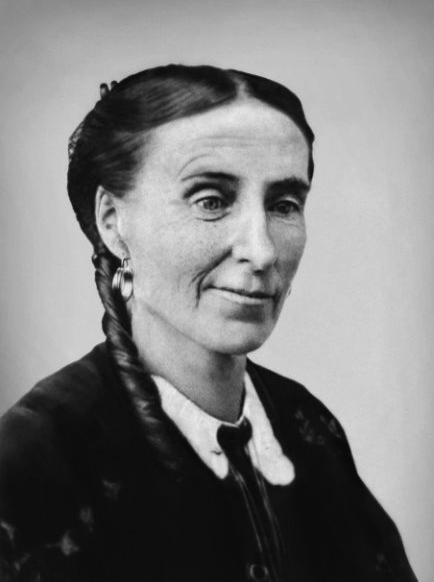
- From the Family Collection of Selwyn Glynn Brisbane Australia
- Born: 16 January 1816; Stranorlar, County Donegal, Ireland
- Died: 21 August 1879 (aged 63); Richmond, Surrey, England

Frances Browne (16 January 1816 – 21 August 1879) was an Irish poet and novelist. Browne became blind after contracting smallpox as a young child. She wrote her first poem at age 7, and went on to write essays, reviews, stories, and poems. She is best remembered for her collection of short stories for children, Granny's Wonderful Chair. A statue of Browne was erected in Stranorlar in 2010, and since 2021 an annual festival is held in her honour.

== Early life ==
She was born at Stranorlar, in County Donegal, Ireland, the seventh child in a family of twelve children. Her father was the town's first postmaster. She was blind as a consequence of an attack of smallpox when she was 18 months old. In her writings, she recounts how she learned by heart the lessons which her brothers and sisters said aloud every evening, and how she bribed them to read to her by doing their chores. She then worked hard at memorising all that she had heard.

She composed her first poem, a version of "The Lord's Prayer", when she was seven years of age.

== First publications ==
In 1841, Browne's first poems were published in the Irish Penny Journal. These included the lyric "Songs of Our Land", which can be found in anthologies of Irish patriotic verse. In the following months, she published poems in the London literary magazine the Athenaeum. According to Alexis Easley, "almost all of the poems Brown published in the Athenaeum were immediately reprinted in periodicals and newspapers," thus bringing her work to an even wider audience.

Browne published her first volume of poetry, The Star of Attéghéi, the Vision of Schwartz, and other Poems, in 1844. The volume received mostly positive reviews. However, as Heather Tilley has noted, early commentary on Browne’s work was "characterized by its fascination with the way in which an individual with effectively no visual memory was able to become a writer and, moreover, a writer who could accurately convey visual concepts and images." The provincial newspapers, especially the Belfast-based Northern Whig, reprinted many of her poems, and she became widely known as 'The Blind Poetess of Ulster'. In December 1844, Prime Minister Robert Peel granted her an annual pension of twenty pounds.

In March 1845, she made her first contribution to the popular magazine Chambers's Edinburgh Journal. It was a short story called "The Lost New Year's Gift", which tells of a poor dressmaker in London. She continued to write for Chambers's for the next 25 years.

== Emigration to Edinburgh and London ==
In 1847, Browne left Donegal for Edinburgh with her sister Rebecca, who also served as her amanuensis. She quickly established herself in literary circles and, in spite of health problems, wrote essays, reviews, stories, and poems. While in Edinburgh she published her second poetry collection, Lyrics and Miscellaneous Poems (1848), which she dedicated to Robert Peel. She also published a series of twelve "Legends of Ulster", which appeared between 1849 and 1851 in Tait's Edinburgh Magazine. Raymond Blair has argued that, while most of the legends “focus on the intervention of dark supernatural powers,” they also exhibit “sympathy for the oppressed” and especially for "disadvantaged young women.”

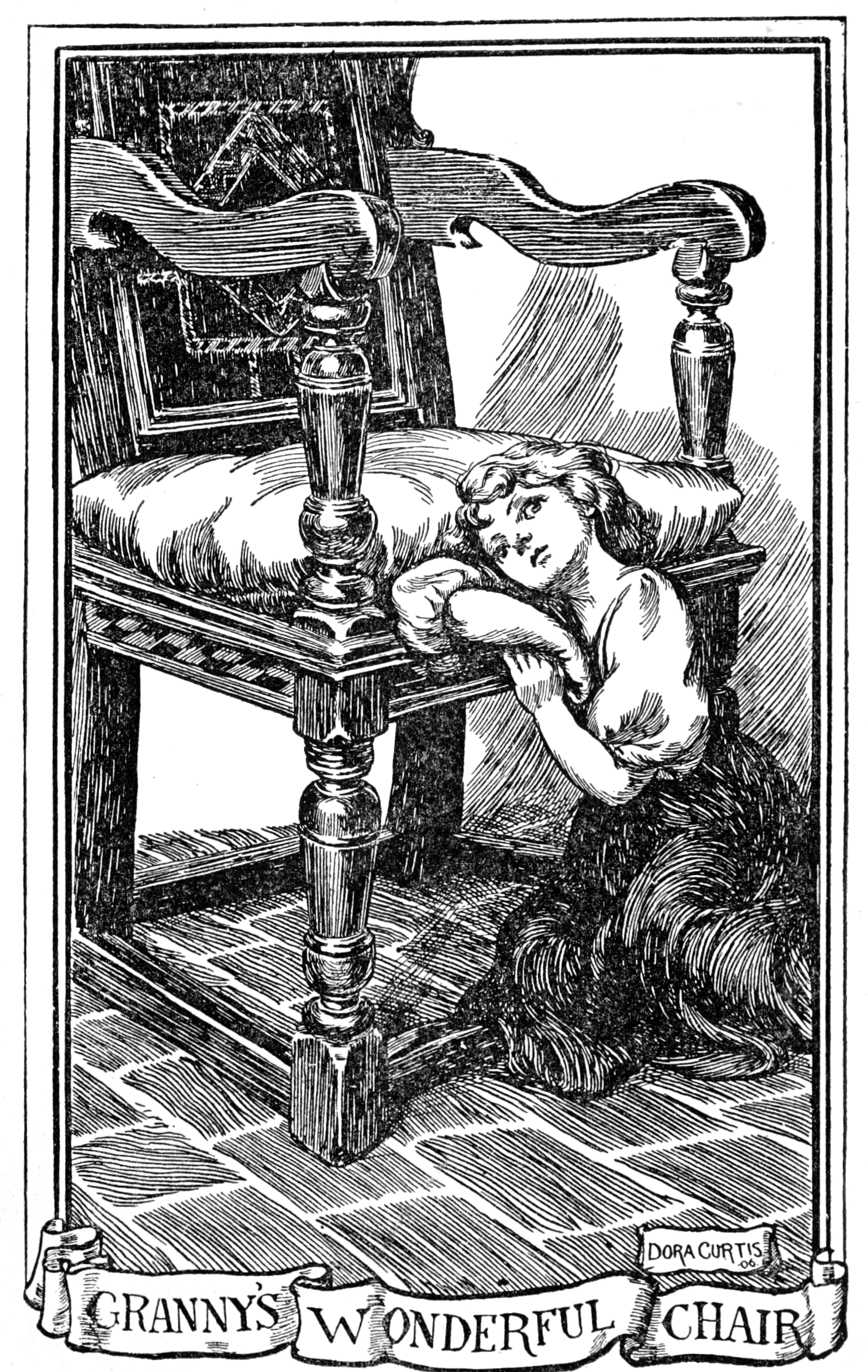
Illustration by Dora Curtis from 1913 edition of Granny's Wonderful Chair

Browne regularly contributed short stories to magazines with a largely female readership, including a number to the Ladies' Companion, a magazine read by many well-to-do women of the Victorian era. Her earliest contribution, made when Jane Loudon was the magazine's editor, was "Barbara's Satin: A Tale of the Cumberland Peasantry" (April 13, 1850). Later contributions included the amusing "Mrs Sloper's Swan" (October 1853) and an eerie tale set in County Fermanagh, called "The Botheration of Ballymore" (April 1855).

In 1852, she moved to London. Around this time her sister Rebecca married, and Browne "established a partnership with Emma Eliza Hickman, who served as her companion and amanuensis for the rest of her life." In 1856 her third volume of poetry appeared, Pictures and Songs of Home, which was directed at very young children and contains beautiful illustrations. The poems focus on her childhood experiences in County Donegal and provide evocative descriptions of its countryside.

Her best known work, Granny's Wonderful Chair, is a richly imaginative collection of fairy stories. It concerns a poor, orphaned girl named Snowflower who has the ability to command her grandmother’s chair to tell stories and to transport her to different locations. Transported to the castle of King Winwealth, Snowflower asks the chair to tell a story each night for the amusement of the court. The seven fairy tales told by the chair make up the bulk of the book. First published in 1857 with illustrations by Kenny Meadows, Granny's Wonderful Chair has been translated into several languages. According to Humphrey Carpenter and Mari Prichard, it "contains some of the best original short fairy tales of its period."

Browne published her first novel, My Share of the World, in 1861. A second three-volume novel, The Castleford Case, quickly followed in 1862. Despite her impressive productivity, Browne struggled with her finances. The Royal Literary Fund awarded Browne “fifty pounds in November 1860, forty pounds in April 1863, [and] thirty pounds in November 1866.” Even with this assistance, she declared bankruptcy in April 1867.

== Later life and posthumous controversy ==
In London, Browne wrote frequently for the Religious Tract Society's periodicals The Leisure Hour and The Sunday at Home. One of those in The Leisure Hour was "1776: a tale of the American War of Independence", which appeared on the centenary of that event in 1876. As well as describing some of the revolutionary events, it is a love story and beautifully illustrated. Her last piece of writing was a poem called "The Children's Day", which appeared in The Sunday at Home in 1879.

Frances Browne died on 21 August 1879 at 19 St John's Grove, Richmond upon Thames. She left all of her assets, which amounted to less than £100, to her companion Emma Eliza Hickman. She was buried in Richmond Old Burial Ground on 25 August 1879.

In 1886–87, the British-American writer Frances Hodgson Burnett published a fairy tale called “The Story of Prince Fairyfoot”. It appeared over three issues of the American magazine for children, St. Nicholas. A reader noticed that the story had been plagiarised from Browne's “The Story of Fairyfoot" in Granny’s Wonderful Chair. The editor apologised, stating that Burnett said she remembered the story from her childhood but had been unable to find a copy of the source book. She had intended the story to appear with the subtitle, "Stories from the Lost Fairy-Book" but the editor had omitted it. Seventeen years later, in 1904, and after the work was out of copyright, Burnett wrote an introduction for a new edition of Granny’s Wonderful Chair. Many more editions of the book would appear in the following decades.

== Legacy ==
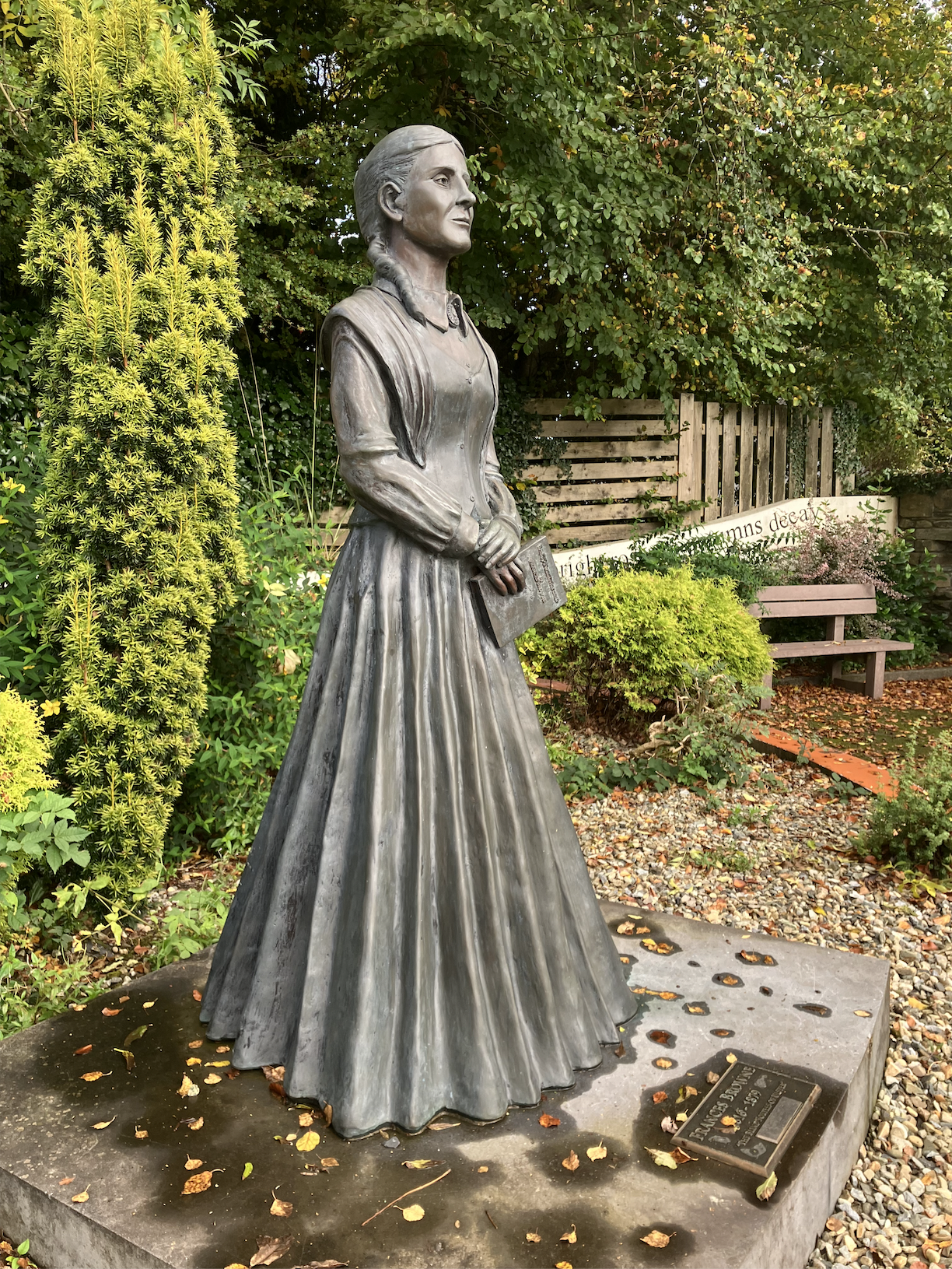
Statue of Frances Browne in Stranorlar, County Donegal, Ireland

A bronze statue of Browne was erected in Stranorlar in 2010. Since 2021, the Frances Browne Literary Festival has been an annual event in the twin towns of Stranorlar and Ballybofey. The festival, which takes place in October, “celebrates the rich cultural and literary heritage of East Donegal.” It includes lectures, musical performances, and a multilingual poetry competition, with awards for poems in English, Irish, and Ulster Scots. Recent guests have included Annemarie Ní Churreáin and Nessa O'Mahony. Local writer Shirley Anne Godfrey wrote a play Frances Browne: In My Mind’s Eye, which was first produced in 2016, the bicentenary of Browne's birth.

== Works ==
- The Star of Attéghéi, the Vision of Schwartz, and other Poems. London: Edward Moxon, 1844.
- Lyrics and Miscellaneous Poems. Edinburgh: Sutherland and Knox, 1848.
- The Ericksons. The Clever Boy; Or, Consider Another. Edinburgh: Paton and Ritchie, 1852.
- Pictures and Songs of Home. London: Thomas Nelson and Sons, [nd, 1856].
- Granny's Wonderful Chair, and its Tales of Fairy Times. London: Griffith and Farran, 1857.
- Our Uncle the Traveller's Stories. London: W. Kent & Co., 1859.
- My Share of the World. 3 vols. London: Hurst and Blackett, 1861.
- The Castleford Case. 3 vols. London: Hurst and Blackett, 1862.
- The Orphans of Elfholm, and Other Stories. London: Groombridge and Sons, [nd, 1862].
- The Hidden Sin. 3 vols. London: Richard Bentley, 1866.
- The Exile's Trust, A Tale of the French Revolution, and other Stories. London: Leisure Hour, 1869.
- The Nearest Neighbour, and other Stories. London: The Religious Tract Society, [nd, 1875].
