= Harriette Campbell =

Scottish novelist, 1817–1841

- Born: August 1817; Stirling
- Died: 15 February 1841 (aged 23); Lafarre, near Montreux, Vevey, Switzerland

Harriette Campbell (August 1817 – 15 February 1841) was a Scottish novelist. Her travel writings on the Highlands were also appreciated.

== Life ==
Campbell was born in Stirling in 1817. Her father was Robert Campbell. She took an early interest in books and was well read whilst still a child. She travelled to the highlands of Scotland and her resulting writings were published in magazines.

Campbell's first novel, The Only Daughter: A Domestic Story, was published in 1839, but it was her second, The Cardinal Virtues, or, Morals and Manners Connected, that made her reputation. By this time she had spent just one winter in London society before she went abroad to regain her health. This did not happen and she died from influenza and was buried in Switzerland in 1841. This was the same year as her best novel was published.

Her third novel, Self-Devotion: or, The History of Katherine Randolph, was published posthumously in 1842.

== Works ==
- The Only Daughter: A Domestic Story (1839)
- The Cardinal Virtues: or, Morals and Manners Connected (1841)
- Self-Devotion: or, The History of Katherine Randolph (1842)
