= Scott McBain =

Scottish fiction writer

Scott McBain is a pseudonym of a Scottish fiction writer.

McBain was born in Stirling, Scotland in June 1960. He lived in Girvan on the west coast of Scotland until 1969; he moved to England after his parents' divorce.

He graduated from Peterhouse, Cambridge, mastering in law. In the years from 1986 to 1987 he received a Fulbright scholarship and studied at Harvard University.

McBain lives in Panama and is married to a local.

== Work ==
- The Mastership Game (2000), ISBN 3-426-61862-1
- The Coins of Judas (2001), ISBN 3-426-62476-1
- The Final Solution (2005), HarperCollins, London, no release to date,
  - German edition released as "Der Mastercode" ISBN 3-426-62902-X

== External links and references ==
http://www.harpercollins.com.au/authors/50015981/Scott_McBain/index.aspx?authorID=50015981

- http://www.authortracker.ca/author.asp?a=authorid&b=uk_3808 (Engl.)
