= Donald Campbell (poet) =

Scottish poet and playwright

- Campbell, at home in Marchmont, Edinburgh, in March 2017
- Born: 25 February 1940; Wick, Caithness, Scotland
- Died: 8 March 2019 (aged 79); Edinburgh, Scotland
- Occupations: Poet, playwright
- Writing career
- Language: Scots, English
- Period: 1970–2017
- Genre: Lyric poetry

Donald Campbell (25 February 1940 – 8 March 2019) was a Scottish poet, playwright, and theatre historian.

Alongside other Scottish playwrights inspired by Robert McLellan (such as Stewart Conn and Bill Bryden), Campbell helped to revise "the presentation of Scottish history" on stage in the 1970s and 80s, with strong political undercurrents.

As a poet, he spent several decades visiting and working with children in schools around Scotland. His work with Lothian schools was the subject of the 1976 Scottish Arts Council film Giving Voice: A Writer in the Classroom.

== Biography ==
=== Early years ===
Campbell was born in Wick in 1940. His father was a telephone engineer from Edinburgh and his mother a woman from Caithness, the pair of whom moved to Wick at the outbreak of World War II. When the War ended, the family returned to Edinburgh, where Campbell was raised.

He attended Craiglockhart Primary School at the same time as famed poet Norman MacCaig was a teacher there, and Boroughmuir High School, where Gaelic poet Sorley MacLean was the Head of English. Campbell would later describe both of them as early influences in his life.

By his own account, Campbell began writing and reading poetry as a teenager, though not "in the classroom". Rather, he claimed that owing to his "troublesome" behaviour, he spent many detentions in the school library, where he discovered Hugh MacDiarmid, Alexander Scott, Dylan Thomas, and Robert Garioch.

In 1956, aged 16, Campbell attended a performance of Robert McLellan's play, Jamie The Saxt, in the Royal Lyceum Theatre. In retrospect, he called the play "liberation", and credited McLellan as having a profound influence on his work.

After graduating high school, Campbell undertook a banking apprenticeship with the Bank of Scotland. Following his apprenticeship, he left Edinburgh for London in 1961, aged 21, spending three years working odd jobs and writing poetry, before returning to Edinburgh in 1964. He remained there for the rest of his life.

In 1966, Campbell married Jean Fairgrieve, a civil servant and a "country girl", from whom Campbell claimed to have learnt much of his Scots vocabulary. They had a son together, Gavin, in 1968. By this time, Campbell had began submitting poems to Catalyst magazine, ran by future friend and fellow writer, John Herdman.

=== Return to Edinburgh and poetry ===
After his return to Edinburgh, Campbell worked as an engineer and bank official until 1974, when he left to pursue a full-time career as a writer.

In 1970, Campbell published his first poem in the magazine, Akros (No. 12). In the same year, John Herdman introduced him to The Heretics: an Edinburgh-based "radical writers collective", whose early figures included Liz Lochhead, Robert Garioch, and Dolina MacLennan. With them, Campbell pursued poetry during the 1970s, publishing several collections with small presses in Edinburgh, as well as Akros Publications in Penwortham, England (notable for their championing of Hugh MacDiarmid), who published his first pamphlet in 1971. As part of The Heretics, Campbell travelled around Scotland to perform his poems live.

His first two collections, both of which he wrote in Scots, achieved local acclaim. Hugh MacDiarmid himself wrote the introduction to Campbell's second collection, Rhymes 'n Reasons (1972), in which he praised the poet's work for its "directness of statement and tautness of form".

Campbell's work as a poet led to him being appointed the writer-in-residence for Lothian schools from 1974 to 1977; the first full-time writer to be appointed to an education authority in Scotland. He would continue to work in the schools for the next twenty years. It also led to him starring in the short film, Giving Voice, produced by the Scottish Arts Council, in 1976.

=== Turn to playwrighting ===
In 1973, Campbell began playwrighting, going on to produce several plays with The Heretics, starting with The Jesuit in 1976. Covering the trial of John Ogilvie, the play was performed in Edinburgh's Traverse Theatre under the artistic direction of Chris Parr. At the time, The Scottish Historical Review described it as "one of the most important works to have been written for the Scottish stage in recent times."

From 1981 to 1983, Campbell was the writer-in-residence at Royal Lyceum Theatre in Edinburgh. Towards the end of the decade, he founded his own community theatre, the Old Town Theatre, where he worked as a director throughout the 1980s and 1990s. This was based at the Netherbow, in what is now the Scottish Storytelling Centre.

In 1987, Campbell was appointed a fellow in creative writing at the University of Dundee.

In 1996, Campbell wrote and directed the first English translation of Malin Lagerlöf's The Lighthouse Prisoner at the Northlands Festival.

In 2000, Edinburgh Napier University awarded him a one-year Royal Literary Fund Fellowship.

Over the course of his writing career, his stage productions won three Scotsman 'Fringe Firsts' in the Edinburgh International Festival. He was an Honorary Fellow of the Association for Scottish Literary Studies and a Lifelong Member of the Writers' Guild of Great Britain.

=== Later life ===
Following several decades of playwrighting, Campbell returned to poetry in the late-2000s, publishing his first original collection in nearly 30 years in 2007.

Unlike his earlier poetry collections, most of which Campbell wrote in Scots, Campbell wrote his final three collections in Standard English, albeit with Scots loanwords thrown in. He stated that this was for reasons he did "not fully understand".

By the time of his death in 2019, Campbell had written more than 20 stage plays, 50 radio plays, six TV plays, and two volumes of theatre history.

== Political and artistic views ==
Campbell's long-time friend and fellow writer, John Herdman, described him as "a man of the Left" and supporter of Scottish independence.

However, Herdman also stated that, unlike other contemporary writers of Scots motivated by a political agenda (e.g., Hugh MacDiarmid), Campbell did not use "synthetic or invented" Scots for his poetry, but rather the "demotic" language "he heard on the streets" of Edinburgh. Indeed, despite writing in "Scots idiom", Campbell stated that he did not consider himself "a dialect poet and would not wish to be considered as such".

Ian Brown, Emeritus Professor of Drama at Kingston University, argued that along with his contemporaries, Campbell's stage work focused on "radicalized" versions of Scottish history, exploring "repressed, invisible, or marginalised" counterhistories. His first play, The Jesuit (1976), retells the trial and persecution of John Ogilvie under King James VI, exploring themes of speaking truth to power and politico-religious authoritarianism. Campbell's second play, Somerville the Soldier (1978), is set during the early Chartist movement in Scotland and focuses on similar themes of democratic protest, dissent, and political liberation.

Leonard Mason, of Akros Publications, closely compared Campbell's early work in poetry to that of Robert Garioch, who Campbell himself cited as one of his earliest influences. Like Campbell, Garioch was an Edinburgh poet who wrote in local vernacular. Mason also placed Campbell in direct opposition to the more intellectualising habits of his Scots-language contemporaries, such as Duncan Glen, describing Campbell as a writer of more naturalistic, "social poems".

Another close friend and later artistic director of the Scottish Storytelling Centre, Donald Smith, claimed that Campbell "hated snobbery and pretension, both intellectual and social, and wanted a classless theatre."

== Bibliography ==
=== Poetry ===
- Poems. Penwortham: Akros, 1971.
- Rhymes ‘n Reasons. Edinburgh: Reprographia, 1972.
- Murals. Edinburgh: Lothlorien, 1975.
- Blether: a collection of poems. Penwortham: Akros, 1979.
- Selected Poems: 1970-1990. London: Galliard, 1990.
- Homage to Rob Donn. Dunning: Fras Publications, 2007.
- Fugitives. Comrie: Ochtertyre: Grace Note Publications, 2015.
- Heard in the Cougait. Ochtertyre: Grace Note Publications, 2017.

=== Selected stage plays ===
- The Jesuit (1976)
- Somerville the Soldier (1978)
- The Widows of Clyth (1979)
- Blackfriars Wynd (1980)
- Till All the Seas Run Dry (1981)
- Ghosts (1981)
- Howard's Revenge (1985)
- Dr Jekyll and Mr Hyde (1985)
- Victorian Values (1986)
- An Audience for McGonagall (1987)
- The Fisher Boy and the Honest Lass (1990)
- The Ould Fella (1993)
- Nancy Sleekit (1995)
- Glorious Hearts (1999)
