= List of listed buildings in Langholm, Dumfries and Galloway =

This is a list of listed buildings in the parish of Langholm in Dumfries and Galloway, Scotland.

== List ==
Name	Location	Date Listed	Grid Ref. (Note: Sometimes known as OSGB36, the grid reference (where provided) is based on the British national grid reference system used by the Ordnance Survey. • "Guide to National Grid". Ordnance Survey. • "Get-a-map". Ordnance Survey.)	Geo-coordinates	Notes	LB Number (Note: Historic Environment Scotland assign a unique alphanumeric identifier to each designated site in Scotland, for listed buildings this always begins with "LB", for example "LB12345".)	Image
Townhead, Eskvale				55°09′09″N 3°00′02″W	Category B	37143	Upload Photo
Buccleuch Square, Pump				55°09′11″N 3°00′14″W	Category B	37108	Upload Photo
Charles Street Old, Langholm Parish Church Hall				55°09′01″N 3°00′06″W	Category C(S)	37109	Upload another image See more images
26, 28, 30 Drove Road				55°09′00″N 2°59′50″W	Category B	37113	Upload Photo
1-63 (Inclusive Nos) Eskdaill Street				55°09′01″N 3°00′30″W	Category B	37114	Upload Photo
97 High Street				55°08′59″N 2°59′50″W	Category C(S)	37126	Upload Photo
12, 14 High Street				55°09′07″N 3°00′02″W	Category C(S)	37130	Upload Photo
Langholm Lodge (Both Houses)				55°09′29″N 3°00′42″W	Category B	9733	Upload Photo
Malcolm Monument On Whita Hill				55°09′09″N 2°58′32″W	Category B	9762	Upload another image See more images
9 High Street, Erskine Parish Church (North U.P. Church)				55°09′08″N 3°00′00″W	Category B	37117	Upload another image See more images
15, 17 (Odd Nos) High Street, Buck Hotel Including Barn At Rear				55°09′07″N 3°00′00″W	Category C(S)	37119	Upload Photo
High Street, Statue Of Sir Pulteney Malcolm (In Library Garden)				55°09′02″N 2°59′53″W	Category C(S)	37124	Upload Photo
High Street, Ashley Bank Hotel, Lodge And Retaining Walls				55°08′58″N 2°59′47″W	Category B	37128	Upload Photo
Broomholm House And Gatepiers				55°07′30″N 2°59′08″W	Category B	9752	Upload Photo
Broomholm House, Sundial				55°07′32″N 2°59′05″W	Category B	9753	Upload Photo
Thomas Telford Road, Langholm Academy (Block On South Side Of Road)				55°09′12″N 3°00′23″W	Category B	37141	Upload Photo
Townhead, Clinthead				55°09′10″N 3°00′02″W	Category B	37144	Upload Photo
11 High Street, Townhead House				55°09′08″N 3°00′01″W	Category B	37118	Upload Photo
High Street, Town House				55°09′02″N 2°59′54″W	Category B	37122	Upload another image See more images
30 High Street/2 John Street, Bank Of Scotland Building				55°09′06″N 3°00′00″W	Category B	37131	Upload Photo
74-80 (Even Nos) High Street				55°09′02″N 2°59′55″W	Category C(S)	37134	Upload Photo
High Street, Tollbar Cottage South				55°08′55″N 2°59′41″W	Category B	37135	Upload Photo
Ewesbank House And Adjoining Cottage, Workshops/Stores				55°09′23″N 3°00′03″W	Category B	9757	Upload Photo
Staplegordon Old Churchyard				55°10′53″N 3°01′08″W	Category B	9719	Upload Photo
Townhead, Tollbar Cottage North				55°09′12″N 3°00′01″W	Category B	37145	Upload Photo
Suspension Bridge (Boatford Bridge)				55°09′03″N 3°00′08″W	Category B	37139	Upload another image See more images
Thomas Telford Road, The Holm				55°09′11″N 3°00′16″W	Category C(S)	37140	Upload Photo
Townhead, Bridge (B709 Over River Esk)				55°09′09″N 3°00′04″W	Category B	37146	Upload another image See more images
High Street, Crown Hotel				55°09′06″N 2°59′58″W	Category B	37121	Upload Photo
High Street, Telford Doorcase Or Gateway (In Library Garden)				55°09′02″N 2°59′53″W	Category B	37125	Upload Photo
Langholm Old Churchyard				55°09′07″N 2°59′52″W	Category C(S)	37136	Upload Photo
Langholm Parish Church, Driveway Bridge, Gates And Gatepiers				55°09′03″N 3°00′10″W	Category B	37138	Upload Photo
Langholm Lodge, Duchess Bridge (Over River Esk)				55°09′26″N 3°00′44″W	Category A	9734	Upload another image See more images
Longwood Cottage And Outbuilding With Glass House				55°08′15″N 2°59′14″W	Category B	9761	Upload Photo
Milnholm Farmhouse And Steading				55°10′32″N 3°00′50″W	Category A	9763	Upload Photo
Thomas Telford Road, Schoolhouse				55°09′12″N 3°00′16″W	Category B	37142	Upload Photo
David Street, Thomas Hope Hospital, Hospital Lodge, Mortuary And Enclosure Walls, Gates And Railings				55°09′03″N 2°59′57″W	Category B	37110	Upload Photo
Ewes Bridge (Over Ewes Water)				55°09′20″N 3°00′04″W	Category B	37115	Upload another image See more images
56 High Street And The Edinburgh Woollen Mill Shop, Market Place				55°09′04″N 2°59′57″W	Category C(S)	37132	Upload Photo
Langholm Parish Church				55°09′01″N 3°00′12″W	Category A	37137	Upload another image See more images
Broomholm House, Steading And Former Stables				55°07′34″N 2°59′05″W	Category B	9754	Upload Photo
Highmill Bridge (A7 Over Ewes Water)				55°09′46″N 2°59′32″W	Category B	9758	Upload another image See more images
Langholm Lodge, Episcopal Church				55°09′24″N 3°00′12″W	Category B	9760	Upload Photo
Skipper's Bridge (A7 Over River Esk)				55°08′27″N 2°59′20″W	Category A	9764	Upload another image See more images
Springhill (Former Wauchope Manse)				55°08′52″N 3°00′44″W	Category C(S)	9765	Upload Photo
8 Buccleuch Square, Hamnavoe				55°09′11″N 3°00′16″W	Category C(S)	37107	Upload Photo
House To South Of 12 Drove Road, Fronting Un-Named Close				55°09′06″N 2°59′55″W	Category C(S)	37112	Upload Photo
Glenesk Road, Waverley Mills				55°08′50″N 2°59′50″W	Category B	37116	Upload Photo
Cleuchfoot				55°08′06″N 3°04′35″W	Category B	9755	Upload Photo
Wauchope Churchyard				55°08′49″N 3°00′47″W	Category B	9720	Upload Photo
Buccleuch Square, Police Station Building				55°09′10″N 3°00′16″W	Category B	37106	Upload Photo
Drove Road, House Opposite Number 26				55°09′00″N 2°59′49″W	Category C(S)	37111	Upload Photo
High Street, Royal Bank Of Scotland Building				55°09′06″N 2°59′58″W	Category C(S)	37120	Upload Photo
High Street, Library				55°09′02″N 2°59′54″W	Category B	37123	Upload Photo
High Street, Buccleuch House				55°08′59″N 2°59′49″W	Category B	37127	Upload Photo
10 High Street, Bridge House				55°09′08″N 3°00′02″W	Category C(S)	37129	Upload Photo
High Street, Eskdale Hotel				55°09′02″N 2°59′56″W	Category B	37133	Upload Photo

== Key ==
The scheme for classifying buildings in Scotland is:

- Category A: "buildings of national or international importance, either architectural or historic; or fine, little-altered examples of some particular period, style or building type."
- Category B: "buildings of regional or more than local importance; or major examples of some particular period, style or building type, which may have been altered."
- Category C: "buildings of local importance; lesser examples of any period, style, or building type, as originally constructed or moderately altered; and simple traditional buildings which group well with other listed buildings."

In March 2016 there were 47,288 listed buildings in Scotland. Of these, 8% were Category A, and 50% were Category B, with the remaining 42% being Category C.
