= Langholm Town Hall =

Municipal building in Langholm, Scotland

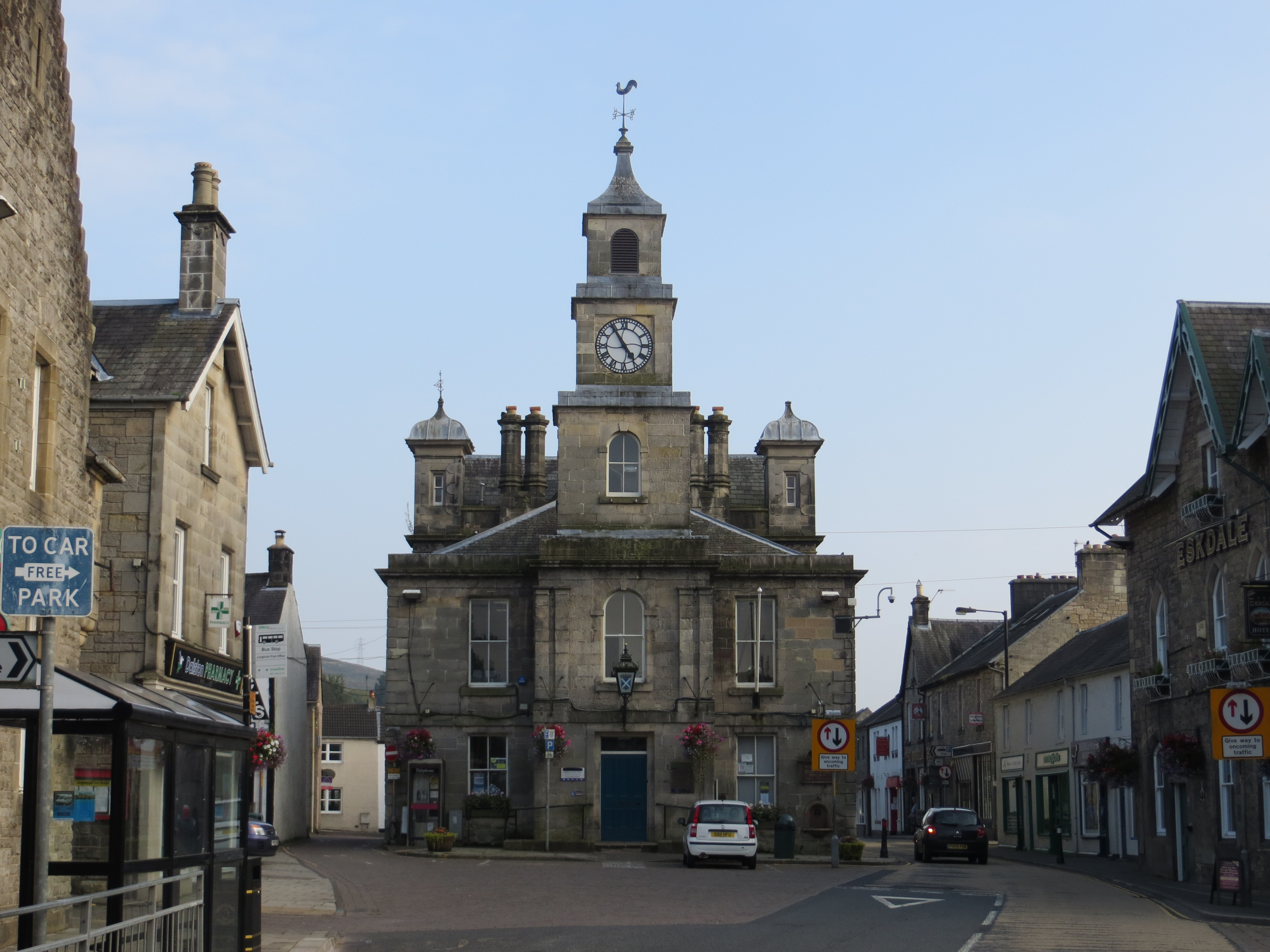
- Langholm Town Hall

- Shown in Dumfries and Galloway
- 55.1506°N 2.9983°W
- Location: High Street, Langholm

History
- Built: 1813

Site notes
- Architect: William Elliot
- Architectural style: Neoclassical style

Listed Building – Category B
- Official name: High Street, Town House
- Designated: 3 August 1971
- Reference no.: LB37122

Langholm Town Hall is a municipal building in the High Street in Langholm, Dumfries and Galloway, Scotland. The structure, which is used as a community events venue, is a Category B listed building.

== History ==
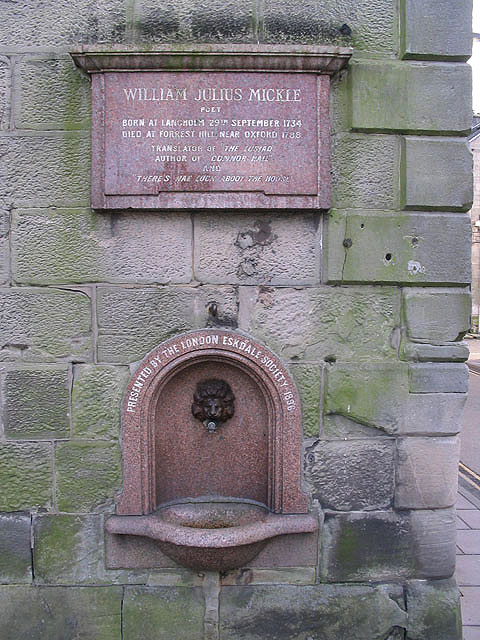
The drinking fountain and plaque commemorating William Julius Mickle on the front of the town hall

The first municipal building in the town was a tolbooth which dated back at least to the early 18th century. It featured a prison on the ground floor and a courtroom for the Regality of Eskdale on the first floor. After the tolbooth became dilapidated, it was demolished to make was for the current structure. The foundation stone for the new building was laid on 24 June 1811. It was designed by William Elliot of Kelso in the neoclassical style, built in ashlar stone and was completed in 1813.

The design involved a symmetrical main frontage with three bays facing northwest along the High Street. The central bay, which slightly projected forward, was formed by a five-stage clock tower which rose in diminishing stages above the second stage. There was a doorway in the first stage, a tall round-headed window with a keystone in the second stage, a shorter round-headed window with a keystone flanked by pilasters supporting a parapet in the third stage, clock faces in the fourth stage and a belfry with louvres in the fifth stage. The tower was surmounted by an ogee-shaped roof and a weather vane. The outer bays were fenestrated by sash windows on both floors. Internally, the principal room was the burgh council chamber.

A white marble statue of the locally-born naval officer, Admiral Sir Pulteney Malcolm, who had been Commander-in-Chief of the Mediterranean Fleet in the late 1820s and, again, in the early 1830s, was sculpted by David Dunbar and unveiled in front of the town hall in March 1842. It was later relocated to the rear of the town hall.

The complex was extended to the rear to create a public library in the 1870s. The library itself had been founded in July 1800 and was partially endowed by the civil engineer, Thomas Telford, in 1834. The site for the new library was donated by Walter Montagu Douglas Scott, 5th Duke of Buccleuch and the cost of construction was financed by public subscription for which the principal subscriber was Alexander Reid, the proprietor of Reid &Taylor, a business which was based at Langholm Woollen Mills. The library was designed by James Burnet in the Jacobean style, built in ashlar stone and was completed in 1878. It featured ogee-shaped turrets which could be seen rising high above the building when viewed from in front of the town hall.

A drinking fountain and a plaque, commemorating the life of the poet, William Julius Mickle, were donated by the London Eskdale Society and installed on the front of the town hall in 1896. Following the appointment of Elizabeth Grieve as caretaker of the library in 1899, the Grieve family, including Elizabeth's son, Christopher Murray Grieve, better known by his later pen name, Hugh MacDiarmid, moved into the caretaker's flat within the complex.

The town hall continued to serve as the meeting place of the burgh council for much of the 20th century but ceased to be the local seat of government when the enlarged Annandale and Eskdale District Council was formed in 1975. The burgh council chamber, which was renamed the "Telford Room", after the civil engineer, was subsequently used as a community events venue by the Langholm Town Band and other community groups. Meanwhile, the area outside the town hall continued to be used as the venue for the closing ceremony of the annual common riding celebrations.

Works of art in the town hall include portraits of three brothers, who including Sir Pulteney Malcolm, became known as the "Four Knights of Eskdale": these were James, John and Charles Malcolm. The portrait of Lieutenant-Colonel Sir James Malcolm is by Thomas Herbert Maguire, the portrait of General Sir John Malcolm is by an unknown artist, and the portrait of Vice-Admiral Sir Charles Malcolm is by John Philip Davis. There is also a portrait by Lemuel Francis Abbott of Admiral Sir Thomas Pasley, a portrait by Alexander Ignatius Roche of William Elphinstone Malcolm who was a local magistrate, and a portrait by George Reid of William Johnstone Carlyle, who was also a local magistrate.

== See also ==
- List of listed buildings in Langholm, Dumfries and Galloway
