= Walter Perrie =

Walter Perrie, Edinburgh, September 2026

Walter Perrie (born 1949) is a Scottish poet, author, editor and critic. He has also published under the pseudonym Patrick MacCrimmon.

== Education ==
Born in the village of Quarter, South Lanarkshire, Scotland, on 5 June 1949, Walter Perrie was educated at the Hamilton Academy, and studied philosophy at the University of Edinburgh. He subsequently gained an MPhil degree from the University of Stirling.

== Career ==
Since the 1970s, Walter Perrie has been a poet, editor, travel writer and contributor to numerous magazines and periodicals. He was a founding co-editor in 1969 of the literary magazine Chapman (Chapman Publishing, Edinburgh), editing the magazine until 1975. Managing Editor, 1985–90, of Margin:International Arts Quarterly, Perrie has also been editor of Lines Review and, with John Herdman, Fras magazine since 2004. Scottish-Canadian Exchange Fellow at the University of British Columbia, Canada, 1984–85, Perrie is also a former Writer in Residence, University of Stirling (1991.). He was a James Merrill Fellow in Stonington, CT in 2017.

== Works ==
Perrie's published works include:

- (as Patrick MacCrimmon) Deidre, 1971
- Ulysses, 1971
- (ed. with Hugh MacDiarmid) Metaphysics and Poetry, 1975
- Surge aquilo, 1975
- Poem on a Winter Night, 1976
- A Lamentation for the Children, 1977
- By Moon and Sun, 1980
- Out of Conflict, 1982
- Concerning the Dragon, 1984
- Roads that Move: A Journey Through Eastern Europe, 1991
- Thirteen Lucky Poems, 1991
- From Milady's Wood and Other Poems, (Scottish Contemporary Poets series: Scottish Cultural Press, 1977)
- The Light in Strathearn (poems), 2000
- Decagon: Selected Poems 1995-2005
- The Corbie an the Tod (Fras Publications: Twelve Fables of La Fontaine made owre intil Scots (Blair Atholl 2007))
- Lyrics and Tales in Twa Tongues (2008) (supported by a Scottish Arts Council Writer's Bursary)
- Gathering Flame and Stone (Rymour, 2026)

Contributions include to Scots Language and Literature (Chapman, Edinburgh 1979) and to The Edinburgh Book of Twentieth-century Scottish Poetry.

== Awards ==
Winner in 1979 of the Society of Authors Eric Gregory Trust Award, Walter Perrie has been awarded Scottish Arts Council Bursaries in 1976, 1983, 1994 and 1999; the Book Awards, 1976 and 1983; the Ingram Merrill Foundation Award in 1987 and the Society of Authors Traveling Scholarship in 2000.
