= John Herdman (author) =

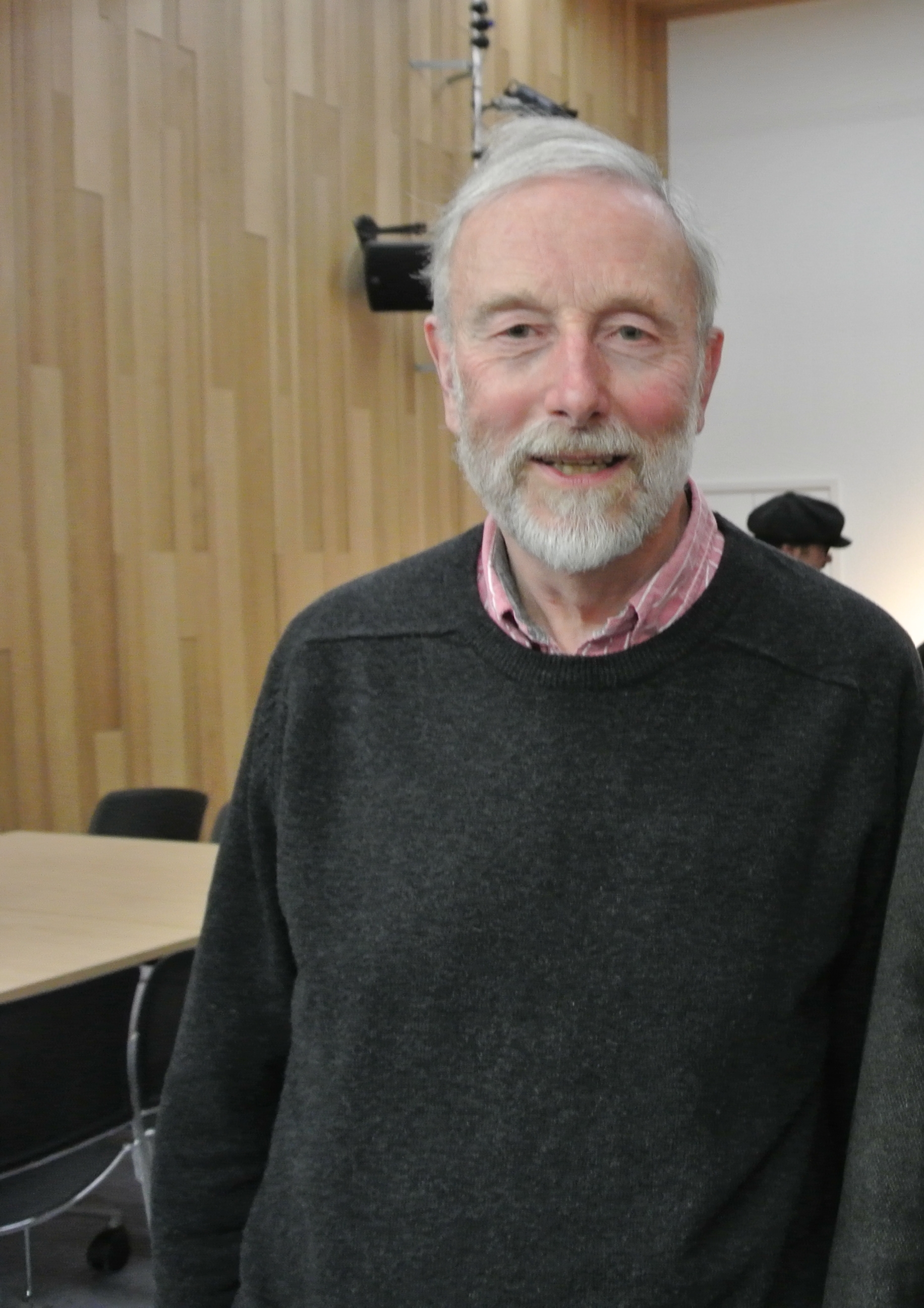
- Herdman at The Grassmarket Centre, September 2014
- Born: 20 July 1941 (age 85); Edinburgh, Scotland
- Occupation: Writer
- Writing career
- Genre: Scottish literature
- Notable works: Pagan’s Pilgrimage (1978), Imelda and Other Stories (1993)
- Notable awards: Scottish Arts Council Book Award (twice)

John Macmillan Herdman (born 20 July 1941) is a Scottish novelist, short story writer and literary critic. He is the author of seventeen books including five novels and various works of shorter fiction, a play, two critical studies and a memoir, and he has contributed to twenty other books. His work has been translated, broadcast and anthologized, and taught at universities in France, Australia and Russia.

== Life and career ==
John Herdman was born in Edinburgh and educated there at Merchiston Castle School, and then at Magdalene College, Cambridge, where he graduated with a double first in English in 1963 and afterwards did research in Scottish literature. At a later date he returned to Cambridge to study church history for a Diploma in Theology, and in 1988 was awarded his Cambridge Ph.D. for his published critical work. In the late 1960s and 1970s he was much involved in Scottish nationalism, both political and literary, a period recalled in his memoirs Poets, Pubs, Polls and Pillar Boxes (Akros, 1999) and Another Country (Thirsty Books, 2013). He has held a Creative Writing Fellowship at Edinburgh University (1977–79), Hawthornden Writer's Fellowships (1989 and 1995), and the William Soutar Fellowship in Perth (1990–91), and has been Writer in Residence at Champlain College, Trent University, Canada (1998). He has received two Scottish Arts Council Book Awards and four bursaries. He is married and lives in Edinburgh.

== Writing ==
As a fiction writer, Herdman's main publications have been Descent (1968), A Truth Lover (1973), Memoirs of my Aunt Minnie / Clapperton (1974), Pagan’s Pilgrimage (1978), Stories Short and Tall (1979), Imelda and Other Stories (1993), Ghostwriting (1995), Four Tales (2000), The Sinister Cabaret (2001), and My Wife’s Lovers (2007). A French edition of Imelda appeared in 2006.

These works have been seen as continuing the tradition of James Hogg and R.L. Stevenson in Scottish fiction, but Herdman's main affinities are perhaps with European writers of the nineteenth century and with Irish and European modernism.

His fictions have a metaphysical flavour and a preoccupation with psychological duality, as well as strong elements of the surreal, the satirical and the grotesque. The books were widely commented upon in Scotland on publication, and studies of interest include Macdonald Daly's introduction to Four Tales (Zoilus Press, 2000), Jean Berton's articles on Ghostwriting in Études Écossaises nos. 8 and 9 (Université de Stendhal-Grenoble 3, 2002 and 2003–4), and Maïca Sanconie's Postface to the French edition of Imelda (Quidam Editeur, 2006). Herdman has been interviewed by Macdonald Daly in Southfields six point one (1999), and by Isobel Murray and Bob Tait in Scottish Writers Talking 3 (John Donald, 2006). His plays Clapperton’s Day and Cruising were successfully produced on the Edinburgh Festival Fringe in 1985 and 1997 respectively, the latter being published in 1997.

As critic, Herdman has published Voice Without Restraint: Bob Dylan’s Lyrics and their Background (London and New York, 1982; Japanese translation, Tokyo, 1983), and The Double in Nineteenth Century Fiction (London, 1990, and New York, 1991), and contributed to various critical volumes on Scottish literary subjects. He has written very widely on modern and contemporary Scottish writers, including Hugh MacDiarmid, Sorley MacLean, David Lindsay, William Soutar, Fionn MacColla, Norman MacCaig, Tom Scott, Duncan Glen and D.M. Black. He edited two volumes of The Third Statistical Account of Scotland: Vol. 22 (The County of Berwick) (1992), and Vol. 28 (The County of Roxburgh) (1992). He is a past editor of Catalyst for the Scottish Viewpoint, and between 2004 and 2012 was co-editor (with Walter Perrie) of Fras and Fras Publications.

== Bibliography ==
=== Fiction ===
- Descent (1968)
- A Truth Lover (1973)
- Memoirs of my Aunt Minnie / Clapperton (1974)
- Pagan’s Pilgrimage (1978)
- Stories Short and Tall (1979)
- Imelda and Other Stories (1993)
- Ghostwriting (1995)
- Four Tales (2000)
- The Sinister Cabaret (2001)
- Imelda (French translation 2006)
- My Wife’s Lovers (2007)

=== Non-fiction ===
- The Double in Nineteenth Century Fiction (1981)
- Voice Without Restraint: Bob Dylan’s Lyrics and their Background (1982)

=== Anthologies etc ===
- Murray, Isobel (ed) Scottish Writers Talking 3: Interviews With Janice Galloway, John Herdman, Robin Jenkins, Joan Lingard, Ali Smith
- Royle, Trevor (ed) Conversations with Scottish Writers No 4

=== Articles ===
- Fionn MacColla: Art and Ideas, in Hearn, Sheila G. (ed.), Cencrastus No. 13, Summer 1983, pp. 11 - 13, ISSN 0264-0856

=== Reviews ===
- review of Mercier and Camier by Samuel Beckett, in Burnett, Ray (ed.), Calgacus 1, Winter 1975, p. 58, ISSN 0307-2029
- review of Kafka in Context by John Hibberd, in Burnett, Ray (ed.), Calgacus 3, Spring 1976, pp. 53 & 54, ISSN 0307-2029
- review of The Life and Work of David Lindsay by Bernard Sellin, in Murray, Glen (ed.), Cencrastus No. 8, Spring 1982, pp. 43 & 44, ISSN 0264-0856
- review of Chronicle of a Death Foretold by Gabriel García Márquez, in Hearn, Sheila G. (ed.), Cencrastus No. 11, New Year 1983, pp. 38 & 39, ISSN 0264-0856

== Reviews and review articles in periodicals ==
- Douglas Eadie, review of A Truth Lover, Scottish International Volume 6, No. 7, September 1973, pp 38-40
- Frederic Lindsay, Both Sides of the Whale (review article on A Truth Lover), Akros, Vol. 8, No. 23, Dec. 1973, pp 38-42
- Bob Tait, Round the World in Eighty Ways (review article on Pagan's Pilgrimage), Akros, Vol. 13, No. 39, Dec. 1978, pp 126-31
- David Campbell, review of Pagan's Pilgrimage, New Edinburgh Review, Nos. 41-42, 1978, pp 66-67
- Peter Womack, Notes to Lyrics, review of Voice Without Restraint, in Cencrastus No. 9, Summer 1982, p.44, ISSN 0264-0856
- Tom (now known as Thom) Nairn, Innocence and Deviance (review of Three Novellas), in Cencrastus No. 27, Autumn 1987, pp 23-24, ISSN 0264-0856
- Douglas Gifford, review of Three Novellas, Books in Scotland, No. 26, Winter 1987, p 14
- John Burns, review of Three Novellas, Chapman No. 52 (Vol. 10, No. 3), Spring 1988, pp 91-92
- Douglas Gifford, review of Imelda and Other Stories, Books in Scotland No. 47, Autumn 1993, pp 1-2
- Angela Finlayson, review of Imelda and Other Stories, Chapman No. 81, 1995, pp 91-92
- Douglas Gifford, review of Ghostwriting, Books in Scotland No. 59, Autumn 1996, pp 3-4
- Gavin Wallace, review of Ghostwriting, Chapman No. 87, Autumn 1997, pp 95-97
- Isobel Murray, review of The Sinister Cabaret, Scottish Studies Review, Vol. 3, No. 1, Spring 2002, pp 138-140
- Andy Gloege, review of My Wife's Lovers, Edinburgh Review No. 121 ("Made in Poland"), 2007, pp.183-4
- Josef Raszkowski, review of Stories Short and Tall, in Cencrastus No. 2, Spring 1980, p. 41, ISSN 0264-0856
- Alan Taylor, Days of Poetry and Passion (review article on Another Country), The Herald (The Arts supplement), October 5, 2013
