= Chapman (magazine) =

Literary magazine in Scotland

Chapman was a literary magazine based in Edinburgh, Scotland. It has published many Scottish and international authors, including Iain Crichton Smith, Alasdair Gray, Sorley MacLean and Kathleen Raine. It covered new poetry and short fiction, as well as critical essays and reviews.

It was launched in East Kilbride in 1970 as The Chapman, a pamphlet edited by George Hardie and Walter Perrie. Robert Calder, Perrie and Joy Hendry edited the magazine during 1975. Hendry began editing the title in conjunction with Perrie, then solo from issue 16 in 1976. She was the magazine's editor until 2005.

It was variously known as Chapman magazine, Chapman: Scotland's Quality Literary Magazine, but Chapman was its proper title.

== Notable contributors ==
- George MacKay Brown
- Richard Burns
- Angus Calder
- Stewart Conn
- Valerie Gillies
- Alasdair Gray
- Duncan Glen
- Andrew Greig
- Christopher Harvie
- George Campbell Hay
- Hamish Henderson
- W.N. Herbert
- John Herdman
- Michael Horovitz
- Tom Hubbard
- Robert Alan Jamieson
- Robin Jenkins
- Jessie Kesson
- Liz Lochhead
- Robert Lofton
- R.F. Mackenzie
- Sorley MacLean
- Aonghas MacNeacail
- Tom McGrath
- Naomi Mitchison
- Eric Mottram
- Edwin Muir
- Tom Nairn
- William Neill
- Janet Paisley
- Kathleen Raine
- Tessa Ransford
- James Robertson
- Tom Scott
- Iain Crichton Smith
- Gerda Stevenson
- Derick S. Thomson
- Sheena Wellington
- Christopher Whyte

== See also ==
- List of literary magazines
- List of magazines published in Scotland
