= Common riding =

Scottish equestrian tradition

Riders returning from riding the Selkirk marches

A common riding, or riding of the marches, is an annual ceremony performed in certain Scottish burghs, particularly in the Borders. In the ceremony, a band of riders makes a circuit of the marches or boundaries of the town, ensuring that no neighbouring landowners are encroaching on the burghers' territory.

Common ridings take place in Berwick, Biggar, Hawick, Selkirk, Langholm, Lockerbie, Jedburgh, Coldstream, Kelso, Penicuik, West Linton, Lanark, Lauder, Edinburgh, Melrose, Musselburgh, Galashiels, Duns, Sanquhar, and Peebles.

== Practices ==
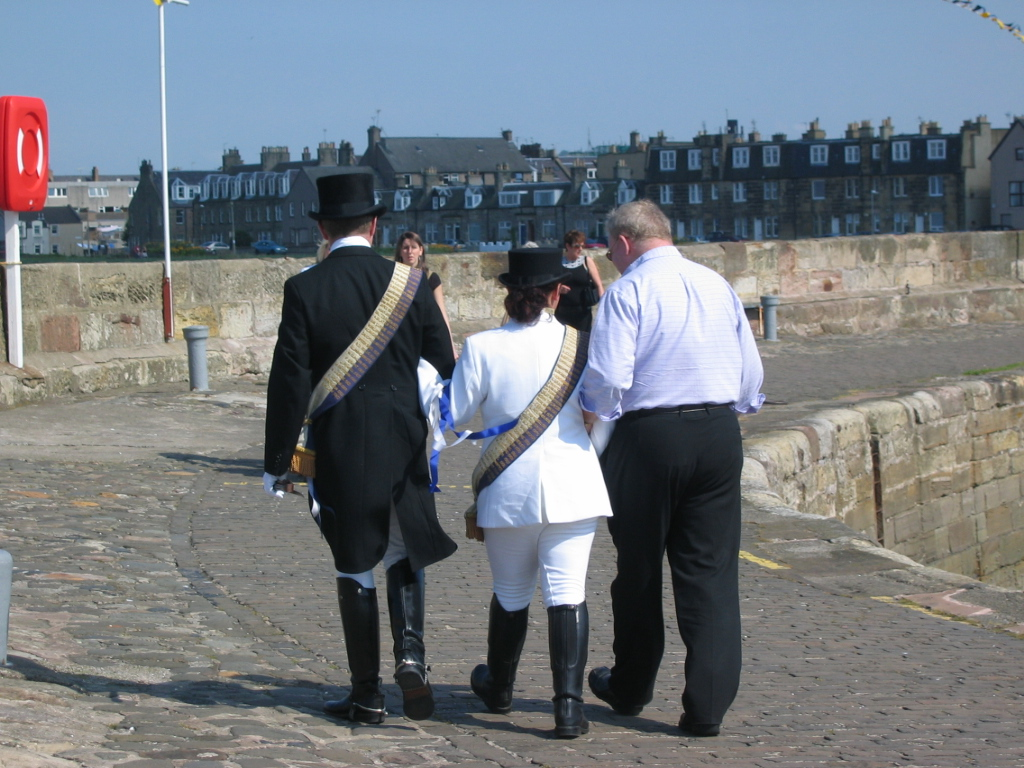
The Honest Lad and Lass, Musselburgh

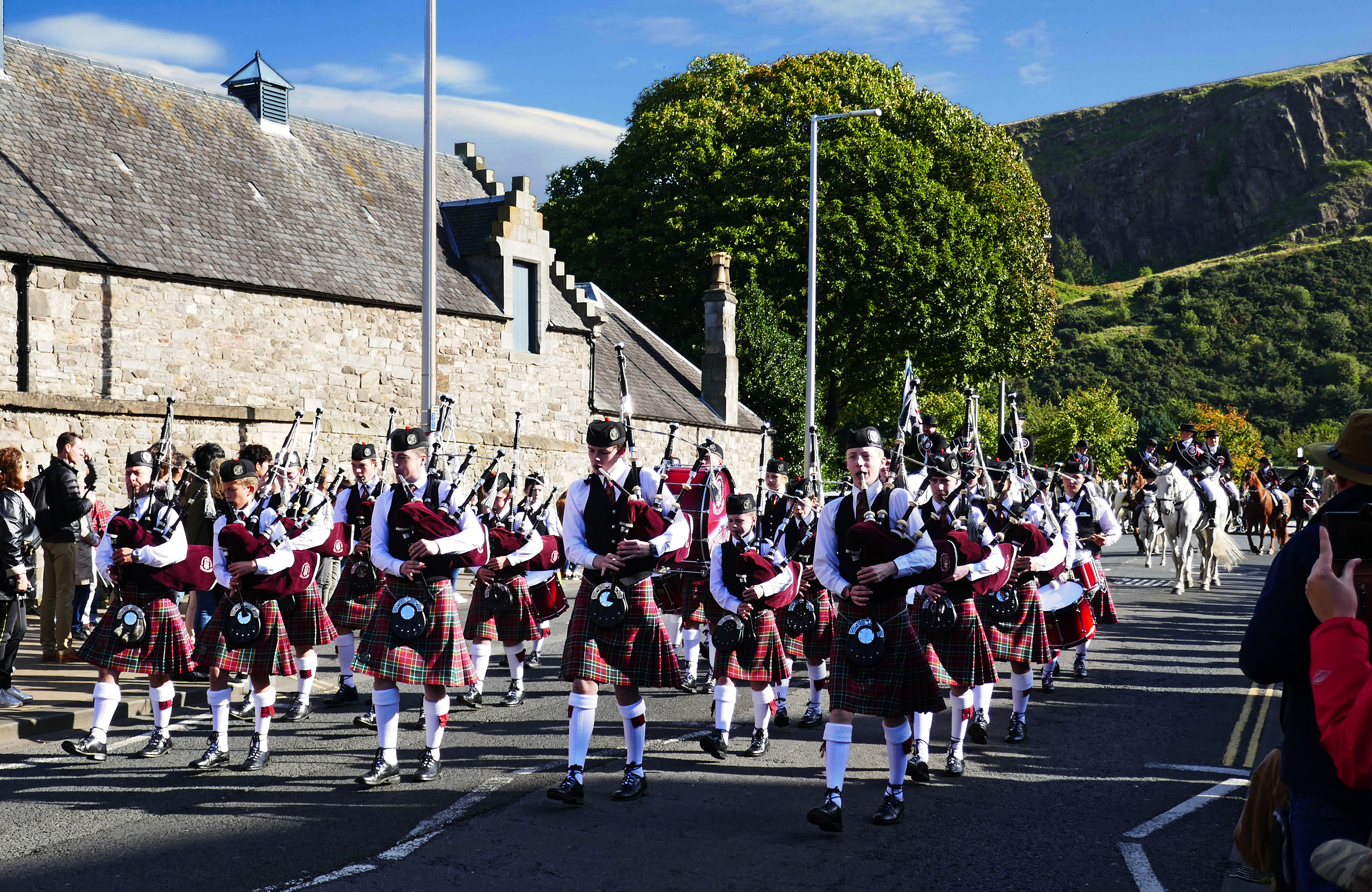
The riding of the marches of Edinburgh, 2019

In the present day, common ridings are celebrations of each town's history and tradition, taking place in midsummer, during a period spanning from May to September. They now involve hundreds of horses, often ridden in costume.

Hawick traditionally begins the season of annual common ridings. Alongside the true common riding towns, other towns which now hold ridings are Currie, Penicuik, West Linton, Peebles, Biggar, Galashiels, Musselburgh, Duns, Kelso, Jedburgh, Denholm, Melrose, Coldstream, Yetholm, Annan, Dumfries, Lockerbie, Kirkcudbright, Wigtown, and Gatehouse of Fleet. One of the most recently instituted common ridings is the Copshaw Riding at Newcastleton, formed in 1998.

Each community starts its celebration with the election of that year's principal in the spring. The principal is usually an unmarried man of good character. The principal then leads the rideout.

Each community often has a different name for their nominated leader/principal:

- Annan: Cornet (and Lass)
- Biggar: Cornet
- Coldstream: Coldstreamer
- Currie: Ensign
- Dumfries: Cornet (and Lass)
- Duns: Reiver (and Lass)
- Edinburgh: Captain and Edinburgh Lass (elected each in their own right)
- Galashiels: Braw Lad (also has a lass elected in her own right called a Braw Lass)
- Gatehouse of Fleet: Lad (and Lass)
- Hawick: Cornet
- Innerleithen: Standard Bearer (and Lass)
- Jedburgh: Callant
- Kelso: Kelsae Laddie
- Kirk Yetholm, Scottish Borders: Bari Gadgi and Bari Manushi
- Kirkcudbright: Cornet and Lass
- Lanark: Lord Cornet
- Langholm: Cornet
- Linlithgow: Provost of the Deacons' Court
- Lockerbie: Cornet (and Lass)
- Melrose: Melrosian
- Musselburgh: Honest Lad (also has a lass elected in her own right called an Honest Lass)
- Newcastleton/Copshaw Holm: Tub (and Flake)
- Peebles: Cornet (and Lass)
- Penicuik: Hunter (and Hunter's Lass)
- Sanquhar: Cornet (and Lass)
- Selkirk: Standard Bearer
- West Linton: Whipman (and Lass)

While most community festivities last a week, some are focused around a few days while others last for up to two weeks. The programme will consist of a combination of ceremonies, rideouts, entertainment, and traditional Scottish sports. Community spirit for the ride is symbolised by the Burgh Flag, which is a colourful ceremony is bussed, recalling the days when a knight's lady attached her ribbon to his lance before a battle, whereby now ribbons are tied to the Burgh Flagstaff by the principal lass. The colours are usually that of the town or village (for instance, Kelso is blue and white, Hawick is blue and yellow).

Today common ridings attract large crowds (of emigrants and tourists) gathering from all around the world.

=== Future concerns ===
In 2026 the cost of the events was noted, being impacted by insurance costs, and health and safety regulations. The 2025 Hawick Common Riding cost in excess of £125,000, portable toilet expenses alone being £7,500, and profits to the community from increased trade and accommodation bookings had reduced.

== Common riding festivals ==
These events take place over the summer season, starting with Hawick on the first Wednesday of May and continuing till mid-September.

=== Hawick ===
The Hawick Common Riding is the first and largest of the Border festivals. It celebrates the legendary capture of an English flag in a skirmish at Hornshole, believed to have taken place in 1514, and the traditional checking of the boundaries of the town's common land.

After election night in May, each Saturday and Tuesday leading up to the Common Riding, the Cornet and his supporters ride out to visit surrounding villages and farms. The first Cornet's Chase takes place uphill on the "Nipknowes" to St. Leonards hut, where a local publican is tasked to supply the customary dish of "curds and cream" or "soordook" for refreshment during the official riding of the marches the following week.

In 2014, Hawick celebrated its 500th Common Riding.

The question of female participation in the Riding has been controversial. Women were permitted to take part until 1931, when one fell off her horse and broke her leg. In 1996, following a successful complaint to the Equal Opportunities Commission on the part of two local women, female riders were again allowed to take part in certain elements of the festival. As recently as 2019, however, female riders were subject to "derision and hostility" when they took part in traditionally male events.

Common Riding Week

On the Sunday before the Common Riding in June, the Honorary Provost's Council attends the Kirkin' of the Cornet, a church service held in the Cornet's place of worship. In the afternoon the Cornet's party travels to the Hornshole Memorial, where the Cornet's Lass lays a wreath. They then travel to the Moor to inspect the race-course.

Following chases on a Monday, Tuesday and Wednesday mornings the second major chase takes place on the Thursday morning at 6:00 am, when the Cornet carries the Flag for the first time. Later the Principals visit local schools, where the Cornet asks that the children are given a holiday for the rest of the week. This is, of course, granted, and the children and parents join in singing festival songs.

Colour bussing

The Colour Bussing takes place on a Thursday evening in the Town Hall. The Honorable Provost and Magistrates are played into a packed Hall by the Drum and Fife Band. Then come the Lasses with the Maids of Honour. The Cornet's Lass carries the Flag to the front of the Hall with her attendants and "busses" the Flag by tying ribbons to the head of the staff. The Flag is then given to the Cornet when he is reminded that it is "the embodiment of all the traditions that are our glorious heritage". The Cornet is charged to ride the marches of the commonty of Hawick and return the Flag "unsullied and unstained". The Halberdier then calls on the burgesses to "ride the meiths and marches of the commonty". Then begins the Cornet's Walk around the town with his supporters stopping on the way to tie his ribbons on the 1514 Memorial.

Friday Mair

Early the following morning the Drum and Fife Band set off to rouse the town. At 6:00 am in Towerdykeside a ceremony called the Snuffin' takes place, when snuff is dispensed from an old horned mull by the town's official song singer. The crowd soon disperses to the surrounding pubs for the traditional rum and milk before breakfast followed by the singing of the "Old Song" at the door of The Borders Textile Towerhouse, each of the Principals taking it in turn to sing verses.

Then the Principals, along with many mounted supporters, processes around the town up to the Nipknowes where the main chase takes place concluding in song, toasts and curds and cream at the Hut. The riders then set off via Williestruther Loch and Acreknowe Reservoir to ride the marches where the Cornet ceremoniously "Cuts the Sod" at the furthermost point of the common. They then make their way to the race-course where, after a programme of horse-racing, the company remounts and proceeds to Millpath where a proclamation is made that the marches have been duly ridden without interruption or molestation of any kind. This is followed by more singing and playing of Drums and Fifes and the Flag is returned temporarily to the Council Chambers where it is displayed. Later the Cornet's party attend the Common-Riding Dinner followed by the Ball where dancing continues into the night before seeing in the dawn from the summit of the Mote.

Saturday Mair

On Saturday the town is again roused by the Drum and Fife Band and by 9:30 am the Cornet and supporters ride to Wilton Lodge Park where the male Principals lay wreaths of remembrance at the town's War Memorial. The procession then heads for the Moor where horse races are again held. At 3:00 pm the Cornet and his mounted supporters leave the Moor for the town stopping at the Coble Pool in the River Teviot to dip the flag marking the boundary between Hawick land and the ancient Langlands estate.

On the Cornet's return, his official duties end when he ceremoniously returns the Flag to the Hon. Provost in the Council Chambers. This is a solemn occasion as it marks the end of the common riding. Outside the riders stand to attention in their stirrups whilst the Saxhorn Band plays 'Invocation' and the Cornet displays the Flag for the last time. Teribus is traditionally sung at many occasions during the festivities.

=== Selkirk ===
The Selkirk Common Riding is a celebration of the history and traditions of the Royal and Ancient Burgh. Held on the second Friday after the first Monday in June, the ceremony is one of the oldest in the area, with 300–400 riders, Selkirk boasts one of the largest cavalcades of horses and riders in Europe. Selkirk still owns common land to the north and south of the town, but only the northern boundary of Linglie is ridden on the day. Selkirk Common Riding commemorates how, after the disastrous Battle of Flodden in 1513, from the eighty men that left the town, only one – Fletcher – returned bearing a captured English flag. Legend has it that he cast the flag about his head to indicate that all the other men of Selkirk had been cut down. At the climax of the day, the Royal Burgh Standard Bearer and Crafts and Associations Standard Bearers cast their colours in Selkirk's ancient Market Place.

Standard Bearer

The Standard Bearer is picked from the eligible unmarried young men of the town who have applied for the post by the trustees of the Common Riding Trust, successors to the old Selkirk Town Council which disappeared following local government reorganisation in 1974. He will normally have served his time as an Attendant to previous Standard Bearers. He is introduced on Appointment Night, the last Friday in April. He is carried shoulder high around the town, accompanied by bands and the crowds of locals. Many civic duties follow in preparation for the main event, participation in other town common ridings and festivities including Spurs Night where the Standard Bearer and attendants meet with the principals of Galashiels at Galafoot and receive a pair of spurs at a dinner in Galashiels. In 2014, Fiona Deacon became the first female Standard Bearer to carry the Ex-Serviceman's flag.

Common Riding week

The Saturday before Common Riding Day is marked with the annual Children's Picnic, where primary school children have races. Sunday sees the inspection of the Rig, the town racecourse and Show Sunday, recently moved to the grounds of the Haining. Traditionally Souters would meet up in their new finery bought for the festivities and sing songs to the town bands. Other events include the Standard Bearers Dinner on Monday, and Ladies Night on Wednesday when the female population take-over the bars and clubs for the evening and only the bravest males venture out! Various bussing concerts and dinners are held for the Crafts and Associations.

Night afore the Morn

On Thursday evening the Senior Burgh Officer takes to the streets to "Cry the Burley", giving notice to the population that the marches are to be performed the following day, naming the Burleymen (four ex-standard bearers), the Burgh Standard Bearer and his attendants. His trek, accompanied by the bands starts in the West Port, stopping in the Market Place, High Street, Back Row and South Port to read the proclamation, ending with the time-honoured phrase "There will be all these, and a great many more, and all be ready to start at the sound of the Second Drum". There follows the Bussing concert for the Incorporations of the Weavers and the Hammermen, in the Victoria Hall. This is followed by an act of remembrance when all available ex-Standard Bearers march to the statue of Fletcher outside the Victoria Hall. A wreath is placed on the statue by the chairman of the ex-Standard Bearers association, and each ex-Standard bearer walks around the statue in order of the year they represented the town, earliest first. (A list of ex-standard bearers can be found here.) Then the pubs and clubs get busy with old friendships renewed, and much singing, or it is off to bed in preparation for a full day ahead.

Common Riding Day

The day begins before dawn, at 4:00 am Selkirk Flute Band begin to march around town, wakening, in turn, Standard Bearer and Provost. There follows an Act of Remembrance by the Ex-Soldiers at the War Memorial at 05:30 am. The "First Drum" is struck at 6:00 am., the Silver Band play around the town and lead the singing of "Hail Smiling Morn" alternating with the first verse of the hymn "Lead Kindly Light". The band stops off outside the County hotel for a rendition of Exiles' Song 'Her Bright Smile' before continuing to the Victoria Halls for 06.30. Meanwhile, the riders assemble in the Back Row. At 06.45 there is the Installation of Standard Bearer and Bussin' of Royal Burgh Flag on the balcony of Victoria Hall. The procession forms and marches to Market Place awaiting the "Second Drum" at 07.00. The procession moves off 'down the Green' behind the Silver band playing "O' a' the airts" and the pipe band, along with the flags of the Incorporations and Guilds on foot. Then follows the Standard Bearer and his attendants and the mounted cavalcade behind.

By 07:30 am the riders begin to ford River Ettrick and onwards to Linglie Glen. The cavalcade reaches the summit of the Three Brethren cairns, the highest point of the ride; Here they rest and the Standard Bearer and Attendants sing "Hail Smilin' Morn" before remounting and continuing the ride.

Back in Selkirk, the foot procession re-forms in Market Place and leaves for Shawburn Toll led by the bands to Shawburn toll for community singing led by bands until the riders return at the gallop. The procession re-forms again and returns to Market Place via Bleachfield Road and High Street to the Market Square for ceremony of the Casting of the Colours; In turn the Royal Burgh Standard Bearer followed by those of the Weavers, Merchants, Fleshers, Colonials, and ex-soldiers cast their flags to the tune "Up wi' the Souters". The ex-soldiers standard is dipped at the end of his/her performance, there follows a Two Minutes Silence to honour the towns War Dead, broken by the Silver band playing the haunting ballad "The Liltin".

The ceremonial ends with the Return of the Burgh Flag "unsullied and untarnished" by the Standard Bearer to the Provost. After lunch, there is horse racing at the Rig, and the ball is held in the Victoria Halls. Saturday ends with "The Games" – gymkhana and professional foot racing at the towns Cricket Club.

=== Langholm ===
Langholm's Common Riding ("Langholm's Great Day") attracts a large number of Langholmite exiles and also tourists from all over the world. The Public election for Cornet takes place in May. It comes from the settlement of a legal dispute in the 18th century, which ensured Langholm people certain common rights (e.g. the digging of peat) within set boundaries. Every year, those boundaries must be re-marked to maintain "the rights". Over the years, this has become a celebration of the town and its people.

Although not originally ridden to check the boundaries, horses are an extremely important part of the Common Riding and the traditions that have built up around it over the years. Common Riding Day is preceded by 'ride-outs' of horses on the hills around the town, and on the day itself the Cornet and his followers have to be able to ride – and ride well – to gallop up the Kirk Wynd, and get to the Monument (erected in memory of Sir John Malcolm), as part of checking the ancient boundaries.

On Common Riding Day, the last Friday in July, after the Cornet receives the flag, there are three Cryings of the Fair: two outside Langholm Town Hall and one on Whita Hill. The Fair Cryer stands on the back of a horse.

The emblems – Thistle, Spade, Crown and Barley Banna' – are also important. The "barley banna" is barley bread nailed to a wooden platter, along with a salted herring, with a large (twai-penny) nail.

Common Riding Day is concluded by returning from the Castleholm to the tune of "Auld Lang Syne", dancing polkas on the A7 trunk road, handing back the flag and finally singing of "God Save The Queen".

=== Lauder ===
The origins of common riding in Lauder are lost in the midst of time, but it cannot be denied that its pedigree is quite lengthy.

In Lauder, the boundaries were marked not by field boundaries but by a number of cairns. The burgesses rode from cairn to cairn and it fell upon newer or younger men to fill their pockets with stones to place upon each cairn in turn. This practice was abandoned when it was found that the pockets contained not stones but bottles of refreshment to be consumed at each cairn. The Riding of the Marches was nevertheless serious business, the date and time being intimated by Tuck of Drum by the Town Drummer. Failure to attend to the duties could result in a fine, in the early 19th Century this was 5/- for a Burgess.

The ceremony originally was held on Ascension Day, when the lands, crops, and affairs of the Burgh were blessed, and the health of the monarch was toasted. Later the date became the King's Birthday. In this respect, it is recorded in the minutes of the Town Council in the early 19th century that the expense of celebrating the King's Birthday should not exceed £2.10/-.

The riders used to race from the Stirk Hill to the Town Hall, but this proved dangerous to rider and bystander alike and was discontinued after many protests. The day closed with a dinner in the Town Hall. The practice was discontinued for about 70 years but was resuscitated in 1911 to celebrate the Coronation of King George V, and has continued ever since with the exception of the two Wars. The revived Common Riding, which we have today differs very little from the original.

It is not held to commemorate a victory over the English in Battle like other Towns or as a Gala Day. The religious aspect is still observed with the Kirkin' of the Cornet, at which the Lords Blessing is sought for the weeks' events. With a few alterations where land was sold, the Cornet leads his followers around the Marches of the Royal Burgh of Lauder with a halt for refreshments at the Waterin Stane and a Toast to Her Majesty. On leaving the Waterin' Stane the cavalcade makes for the Burgess Cairn, the only surviving cairn, and places a stone upon it and on return reports no encroachment on Burgh Land.

In recent times "Tom Waldies bridge", the Waterin' Stane and the Burgess Cairn have been repaired and improved to ensure the smooth running of the common riding. The Millennium Cairn, at the top of the Whiteknowe End, was erected to commemorate regaining the Burgh Charter of 1502.

=== Jedburgh ===
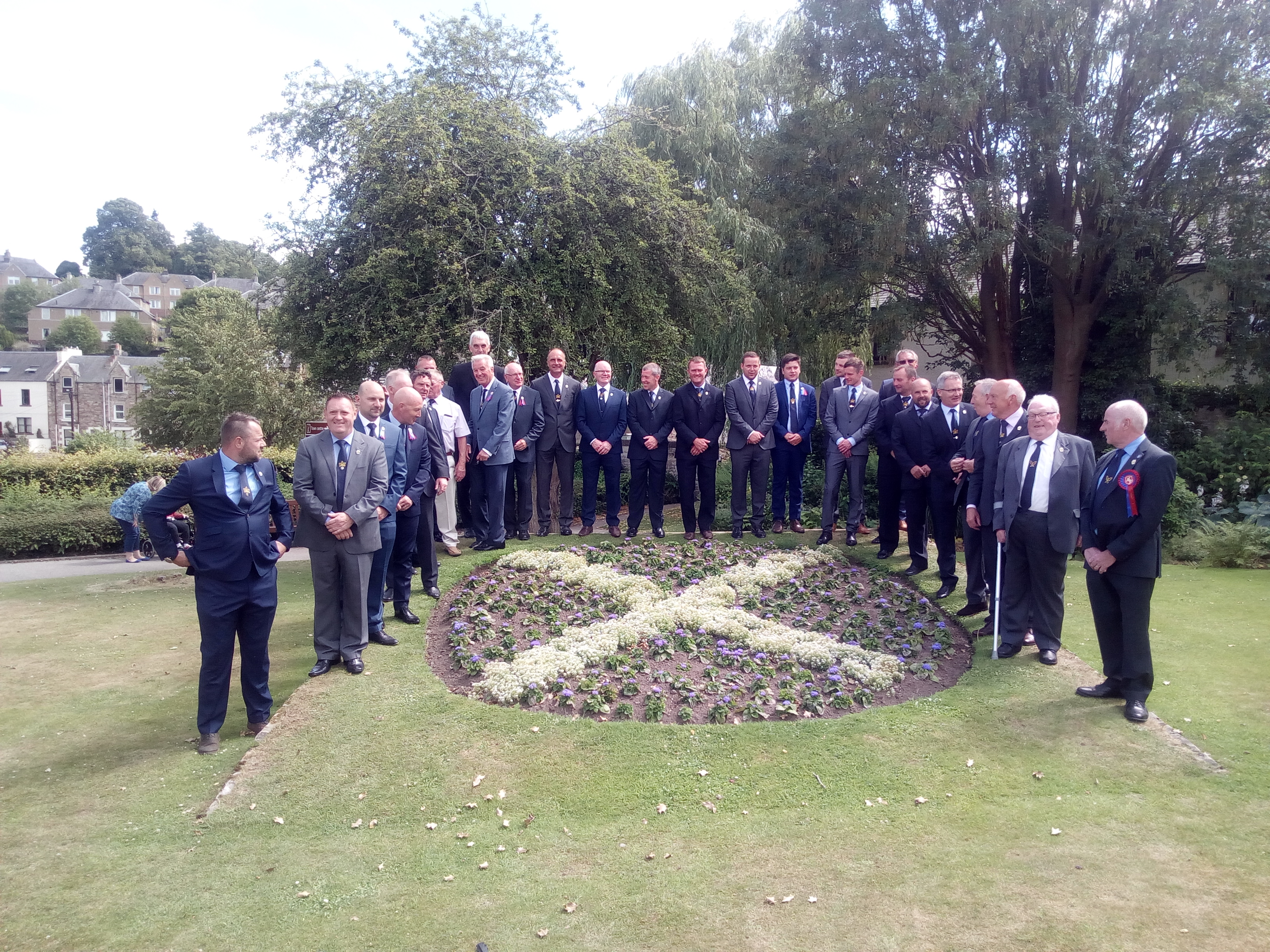
The ex-Callants in 2018 – Callants return to assist each year from wherever they are.

Jethart callant's festival was founded when in 1947, the Border Games Festival Committee called a meeting to discuss the formation of a Pageant. The first callant was a rayon mill worker named Charlie McDonald.

Jedburgh Callants Festival lasts two weeks, with ceremonial rides to places of historic interest. The most important ride is to Redeswire, close by Carter Bar, the site of Raid of the Redeswire in 1575, when the timely arrival of the Jedburgh contingent with their cry "Jethart's here" turned an apparent defeat of the men from Liddesdale into a rout of the English.

The Callant leads the mounted cavalcade to Ferniehurst Castle, halts for a ceremony at the Capon Tree, a survivor of the ancient Jed Forest, and returns to the town for the final ceremony at the War Memorial.

Saturday commences with the firing of a cannon and a race around the town, followed by the Jedburgh Border Games, which date from 1853.

=== West Linton ===
Common Ridings in West Linton are led by the Whipman, the old Scots word for a carter or carrier. In 1803 after the annual meeting of the Whipmen Benevolent Society, the committee paid formal visits to local mansions. The rest of the day, one of the few holidays of the year at the time, was devoted to sporting activities, a gathering which was styled "The Whipman Play". The ceremony has continued since, unbroken except by two wars, revived in 1949.

The Linton Whipman is installed and invested with his sash of office on the Friday evening before the first Saturday in June and leads a mounted procession through the village. Saturday begins with a ride out and there follows a week-long programme of activities of sports, competitions, barbecue, and bonfire.

=== Galashiels ===
The Braw Lads' Gathering is the annual summer festival for the town of Galashiels. The Braw Lads' Gathering was established in 1930 to celebrate the town's history, and in particular commemorates an event in 1337 where Gala men defeated English soldiers in a field of sour plums, the marriage in 1503 of King James IV of Scotland to Margaret Tudor of England, the granting of a burgh charter to the town, and the sacrifices made by local people in World War I.

Every year, a local man and woman are appointed to be Braw Lad and Braw Lass. They take part in the ceremonies and lead the ride outs, where hundreds of people ride through the town and across the countryside on horseback. The main Braw Lads' Day takes place on a Saturday, beginning at 8 am when the Braw Lad receives the burgh flag and rides to the "Raid Stane" at Netherdale, the site of the 1337 affray. The cavalcade then crosses the River Tweed and stops for a reception at Abbotsford House, before riding back to the town, where the Braw Lass mixes red and white roses, commemorating the 1503 marriage. Then the Laird of Gala and the President of the Gathering exchange a parchment, celebrating the granting of the burgh of barony charter in 1599. Finally, the party proceeds to the town's war memorial where, as the clock strikes noon, the Braw Lad dips the flag in a mark of respect to fallen soldiers, and a period of silence is held.

=== Edinburgh ===
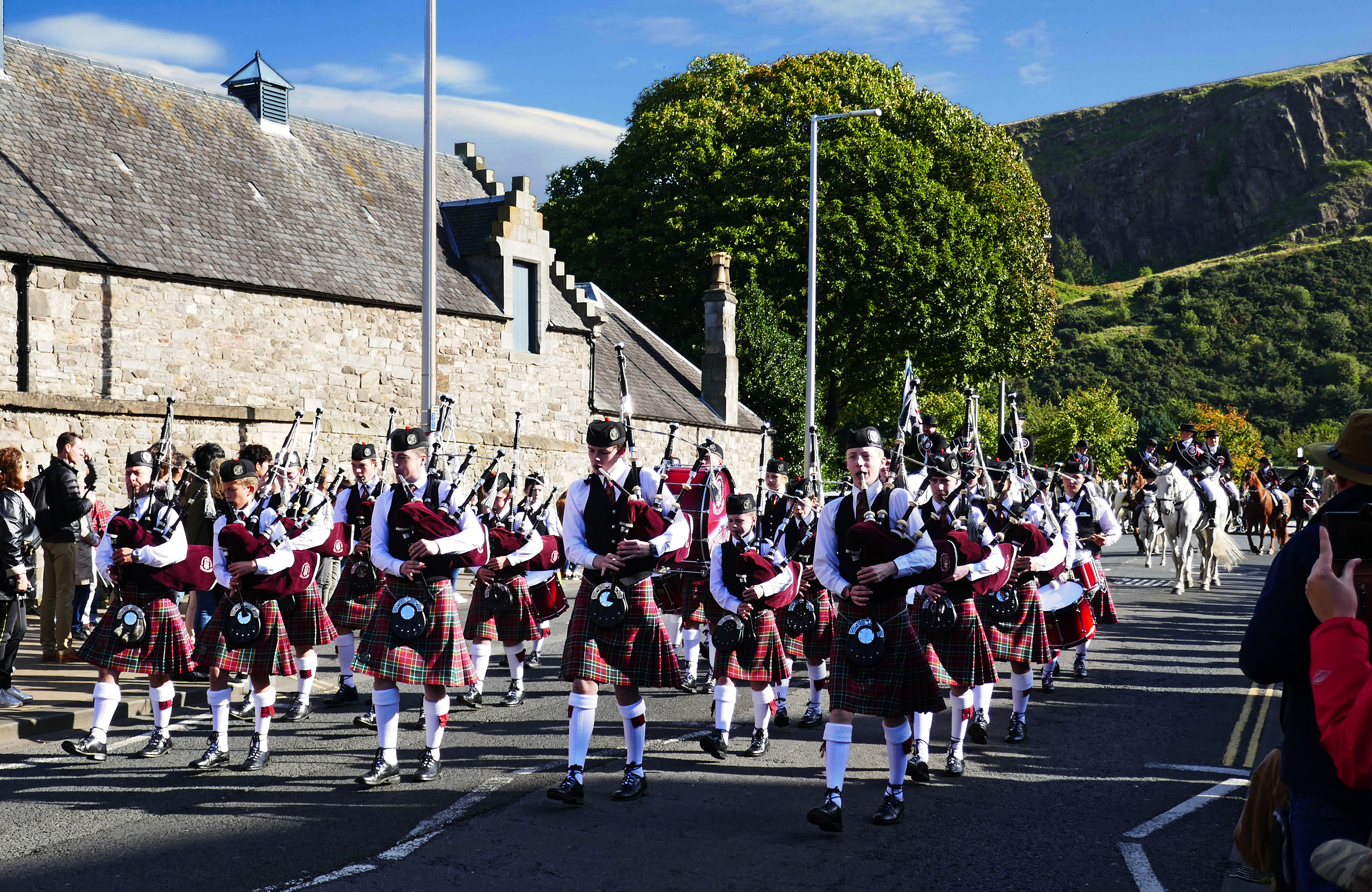
Edinburgh Riding of the Marches. The Captain and Lass on horseback behind a pipe band about to turn up the Royal Mile.

History

The Edinburgh Riding of the Marches dates from 1579, with the inspection of the common land continuing until the demise of the practice in 1718.

Revival

In 1946 a special "Riding of the Marches" was held in Edinburgh to celebrate peace and the end of the Second World War. Seventy riders took part and a large crowd reported to be "approaching Royal visit dimensions" greeted the riders in the Royal Mile. The practice was again revived and re-established in 2009 and has been held annually ever since, growing in popularity and combined with a memorial to the Battle of Flodden.

The Riding and Flodden Memorial

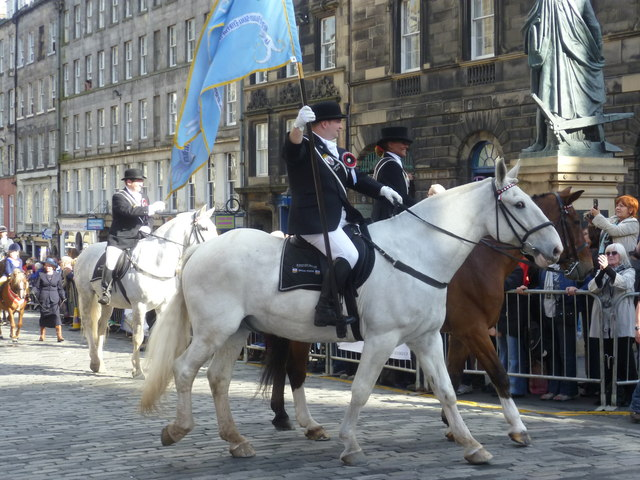
Arrival of the Blue Blanket

Each year, shortly after the new year, the process begins to elect the Edinburgh Captain & Lass, who as the elected principals for the city will represent Edinburgh over the coming summer at various common rides and town festival celebrations, and also at civic events within the capital.

Come September, the Captain & Lass lead the Edinburgh common ride around the boundaries of the city in the morning to represent the 'inspection of the common land'.

After the common riding, the Captain and Lass undertake a memorial ride for the Royal Mile to re-enact Randolph Murray, Captain of the City Band, returning from the battle of Flodden bearing the recovered Blue Blanket of the Incorporated Trades of Edinburgh, with the news that Scotland has been defeated and the death of King James IV. The Captain and Lass are accompanied on the ride by a Cavalcade including mounted units from the Royal Scots Dragoon Guards and Scottish and North Irish Yeomanry, and riders from local stables and riding associations. The riders converge at the Mercat Cross on the Royal Mile, where they are escorted by the High Constables of Edinburgh and a pipe band. The Lord Provost of Edinburgh then commences a minutes silence in remembrance for the fallen of Flodden and all Wars.
