= Langholm =

Burgh in Dumfries and Galloway, Scotland

Coordinates: 55.152°N 2.999°W

Langholm: Scottish Gaelic: Langaim; Scots: Langhowm; The Muckle Toon
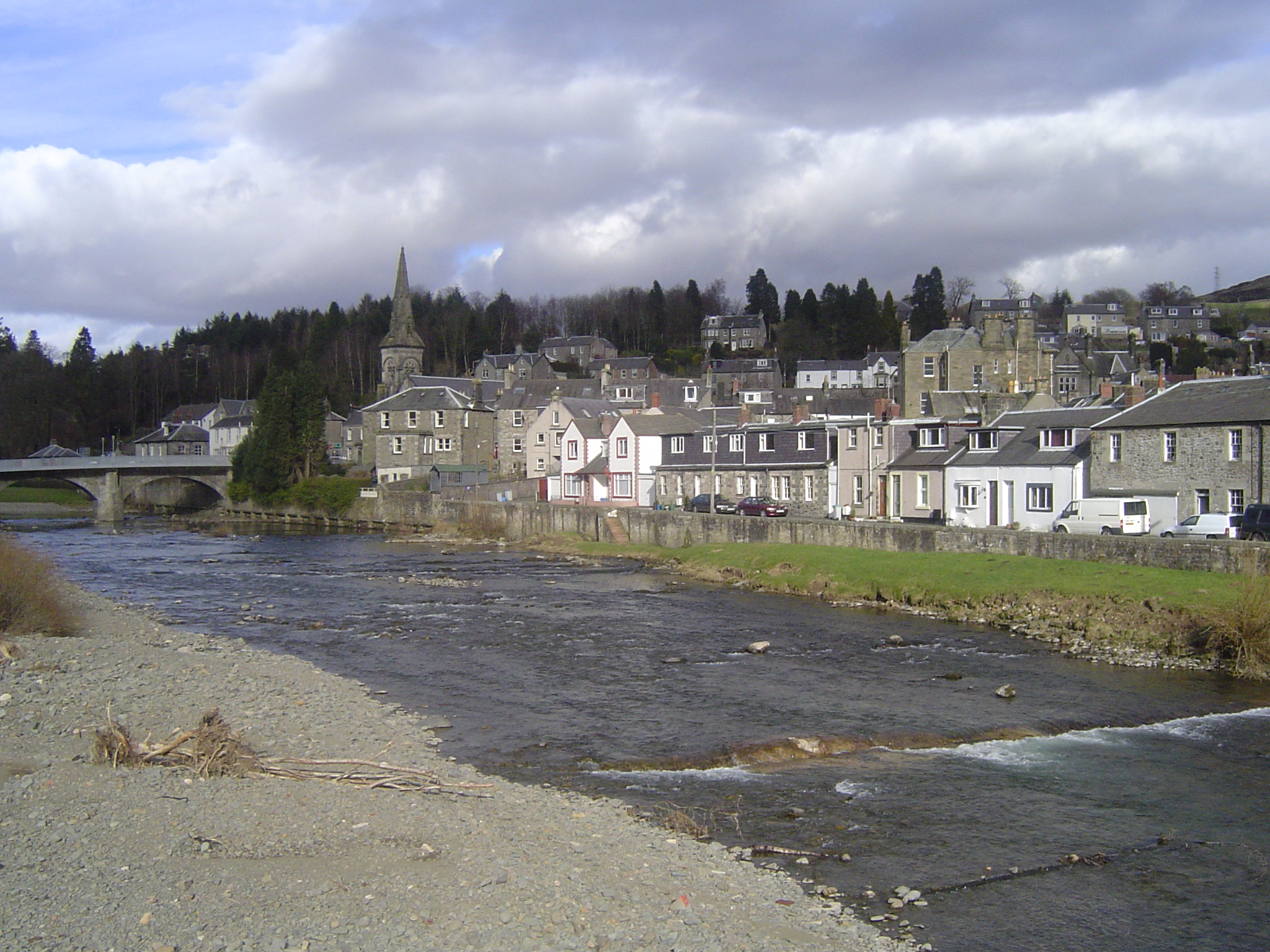
- Langholm and the River Esk

- Location within Dumfries and Galloway
- Population: 1,740 (2020)
- Language: English; Southern Scots
- OS grid reference: NY364847
- Community council: Langholm, Ewes, and Westerkirk
- Council area: Dumfries and Galloway
- Lieutenancy area: Dumfries
- Country: Scotland
- Sovereign state: United Kingdom
- Post town: LANGHOLM
- Postcode district: DG13
- Dialling code: 013873
- Police: Scotland
- Fire: Scottish
- Ambulance: Scottish
- UK Parliament: Dumfriesshire, Clydesdale and Tweeddale
- Scottish Parliament: Dumfriesshire

Langholm /ˈlæŋəm/, also known colloquially as the "Muckle Toon", is a burgh in Dumfries and Galloway, southern Scotland. Langholm lies between four hills in the valley of the River Esk in the Southern Uplands.

== Location and geography ==
Langholm sits 8 miles (13 kilometres) north of the Anglo-Scottish border on the A7 road running between Edinburgh and Carlisle. Edinburgh is 73 miles (117 kilometres) to the north, Newcastleton is around 10 miles (16 kilometres) to the east and Carlisle 19 miles (31 kilometres) to the south.

Langholm is surrounded by four hills in the River Esk valley within Scotland's wider Southern Uplands. The highest of the four hills is 300 m high Whita hill on which stands an obelisk (locally known as 'The Monument'). The Monument commemorates the life and achievements of Sir John Malcolm (1769–1833), former soldier, statesman, and historian. The other three hills are Warblaw (which in Langholm is pronounced Warbla), Meikleholmhill (a knowe a hillock known as 'Timpen') and the Castle Hill.

The two longest B roads in the UK both start (or finish) in Langholm: the B6318, which goes to Heddon-on-the-Wall and is 61 miles (98 kilometres) long, and the B709, which joins the A7 near Heriot after 58 miles (93 kilometres).

== History ==
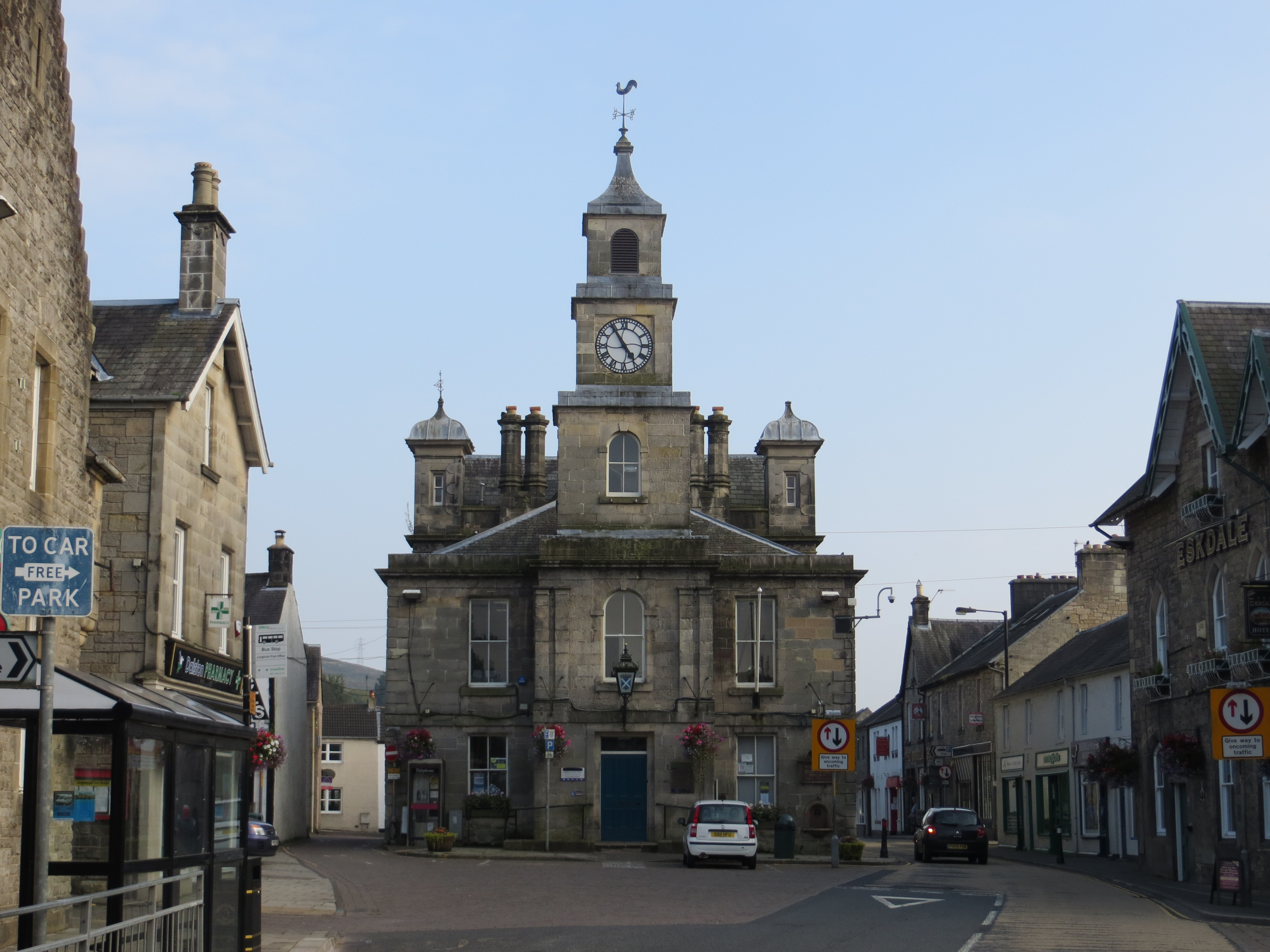
Langholm Town Hall

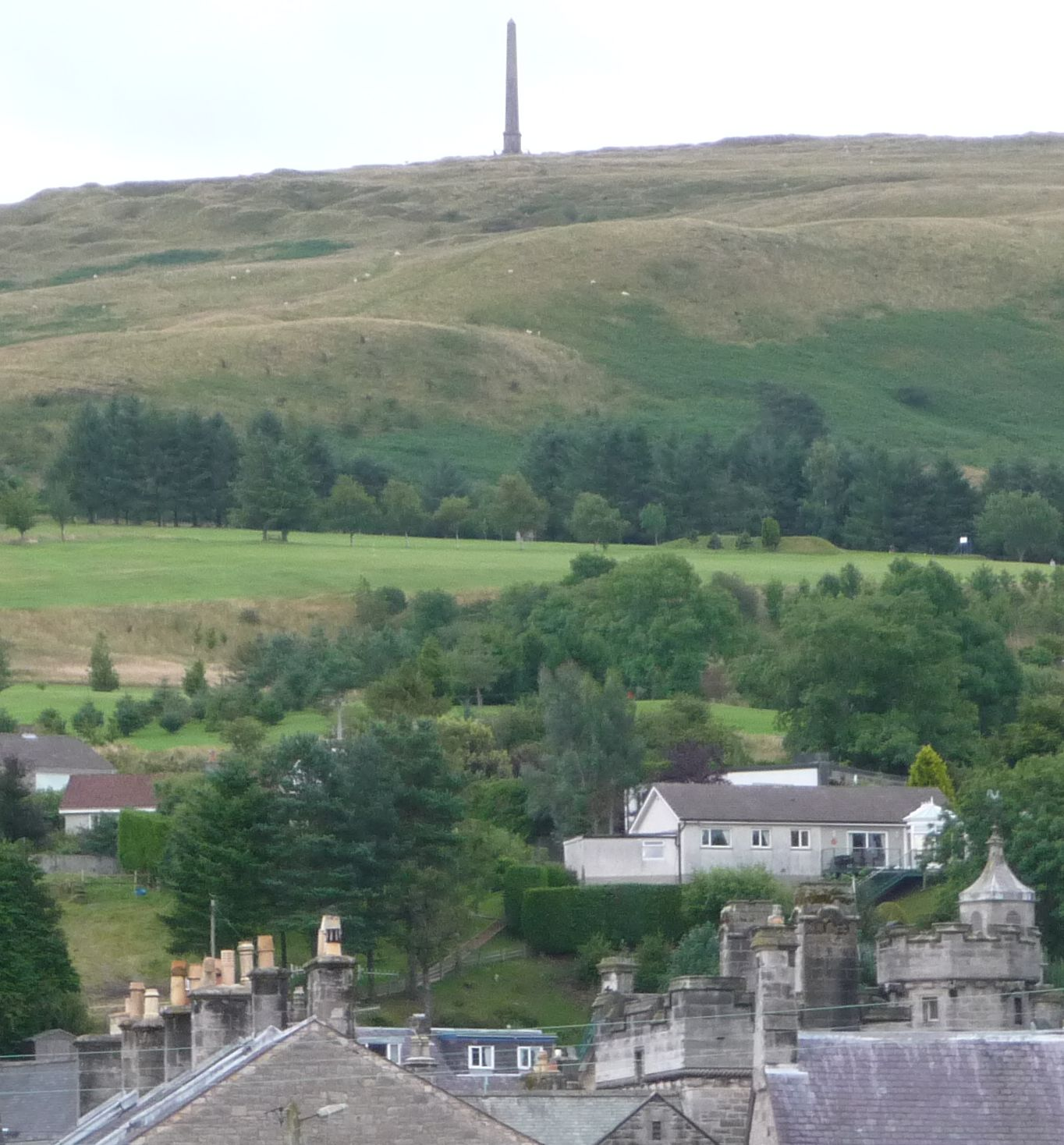
Whita hill with its obelisk commemorating Sir John Malcolm, Governor of Bombay from 1827 to 1830

Langholm was founded in 1455 during the Battle of Arkinholm.

A fort at nearby Langholm Castle was occupied by English soldiers during the war known as the Rough Wooing. Thomas Wharton reported that at the end of April 1543 the soldiers burnt farms at Whitslade in Teviotdale. There were plans to modify the tower by reducing its height to place artillery on it. The garrison was able to influence the region and compel Scots to "assure" with England. Regent Arran successfully besieged the fort on 17 July 1547 and then travelled to the siege of St Andrews Castle to meet a French force. Mary of Guise had the fort rebuilt in 1556.

Langholm is the traditional seat of Clan Armstrong, which is currently represented globally by the official Clan Armstrong Trust. Home of the Clan Armstrong line is Gilnockie Tower 4.5 miles (7 kilometres) south of Langholm and 1.4 miles (2 kilometres) north of Canonbie. The Episcopalian church on Castle Holm fell into disuse before conversion into the Clan Armstrong museum, later moved to Gilnockie Tower.

The town was an important centre for the Border Reivers. In 1759 it won its case in a legal dispute with the Duke of Buccleuch, winning the right of common over the Kilngreen and Common Moss, a success that led to the establishment of the Langholm Common Riding. The town later grew around the textile industry. Langholm Town Hall was completed in 1813.

In 2020 the local community purchased 5,000 acres (2,000 hectares) of Langholm Moor for £3.8m from Buccleuch Estates.

== Governance ==
Langholm is in the parliamentary constituency of Dumfriesshire, Clydesdale and Tweeddale, David Mundell is the current Conservative Party Member of Parliament (MP).

The town is part of the South Scotland region in the Scottish Parliament, being in the constituency of Dumfriesshire. Oliver Mundell of the Conservatives is the MSP.

Prior to Brexit for the European Parliament, Langholm was part of the Scotland constituency.

Langholm is part of the Annandale East and Eskdale ward for both Dumfries and Galloway Council, the ward is represented by 3 Councillors.

The town is also part of the Dumfriesshire constituency for the Scottish Youth Parliament and is represented by 2 Members of the Scottish Youth Parliament (MSYPs).

== Notable residents and visitors ==
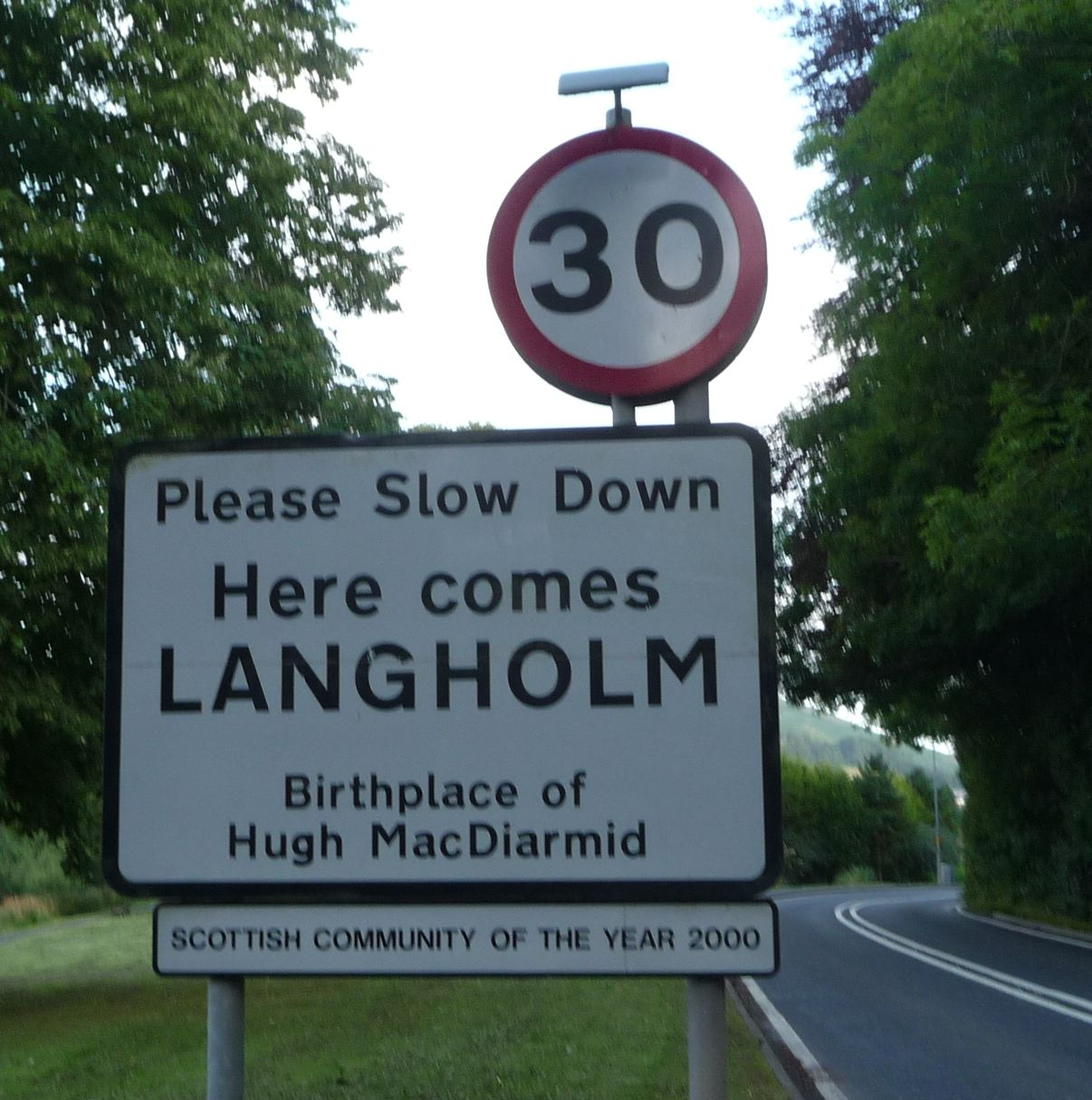
"Here comes Langholm, birthplace of Hugh Macdiarmid."

=== Christopher Murray Grieve ===
Christopher Murray Grieve (known as Hugh Macdiarmid) was born in Langholm and educated at Langholm Academy. The Scottish poet and cultural polemicist was a leading light in the Scottish Renaissance of the 20th century. Unusual for a communist, he was a committed Scottish nationalist and wrote both in English and in literary Scots. The town is home to a monument in his honour made of COR-TEN(r) steel, which takes the form of a large open book depicting images from his writings.

=== The Malcolms ===
The area round Langholm was the birthplace of four brothers who became esteemed military figures of the late 18th and early 19th Century. Sir John Malcolm served as Governor of Bombay and is recognised with a needle-style monument on top of Whita Hill overlooking the town. Admiral Sir Pulteney Malcolm was the Commander in Chief in Saint Helena overseeing the exile of Napoleon; there is a statue of him outside the Town Hall. Sir Charles Malcolm rose to the rank of Vice Admiral, and Sir James Malcolm (Royal Marines officer) ended his career as a Lieutenant Colonel.

=== Neil Armstrong ===
In 1972, astronaut Neil Armstrong was welcomed and made the first freeman and Burgess of the burgh. The depute town clerk at the time later said, “The town council had made the approach because this is Armstrong country and we thought it would be appropriate. It turned out that he was coming to Edinburgh to deliver the Mountbatten lecture so he could accept and come to Langholm.”

The ceremony took place at Langholm's largest building of the time, the parish church. With his manner of modest dignity he stated:

"The most difficult place to be recognised is in one's home town. And I consider this now my home town."

He also commented:

”My pleasure is not only that this is the land of Johnnie Armstrong, rather that my pleasure is in knowing that this is my home town and in the genuine feeling that I have among these hills among these people.”

He then walked for lunch at Buccleuch Hall. His visit is captured in online video. In coverage by the international press, the Chicago Tribune's front-page story included a map of the British Isles marking only London and Langholm. Armstrong, universally known for his humility is remembered as having no interest on his visit of boasting of his achievements. Instead he was absorbed in finding out more of his Armstrong heritage and making a connection with the area.

=== Others ===
The civil engineer and road builder Thomas Telford was born nearby and worked in Langholm as an apprentice early in his career.

The first female corporate member of the Institution of Civil Engineers, Dorothy Donaldson Buchanan, was born and raised in Langholm, daughter of Rev. James Donaldson Buchanan, the long-time minister in Langholm Parish.

David Thomas Richardson, a linguist and officer in the Bengal Army, was born in Langholm.

Between 1904 and 1913 the composer Francis George Scott was a teacher at Langholm Academy, where he taught and influenced the young Christopher Murray Grieve.

Dave Stevenson, Olympic pole vaulter (1964 Tokyo Games) and businessman, was raised in the burgh and his company was based there.

== Economy ==
Edinburgh Woollen Mill was founded in Langholm in 1946 by Drew Stevenson but they moved their headquarters from Langholm to Carlisle in 2019.

Buccleuch Estates have an office in Langholm and own much of the surrounding land.

== Transport ==
=== Bus ===
The X95 cross-border bus service (which is operated by Borders Buses) runs through Langholm, largely following the route of the A7 road between Edinburgh and Carlisle via Hawick + Galashiels in the Scottish Borders.

=== Rail ===
Langholm railway station opened in April 1864, but closed 100 years later. The last regular passenger train was on 13 June 1964, although a special ran in March 1967, complete with restaurant car. The freight service continued until September 1967.

The nearest operational railway stations are at Carlisle in England and Lockerbie in Scotland.

== Local media ==
=== Newspaper ===
The local newspaper is the Eskdale & Liddesdale Advertiser based on Langholm High Street. The Advertiser was owned by the CN Group Ltd. The paper covers news from Langholm and its surrounding areas (notably Canonbie & Newcastleton) and is commonly referred to locally as 'The Squeak'. Established as a monthly in 1848 by Thomas Laidlaw Rome, the newspaper was the first penny newspaper in Scotland.

== Education ==
Langholm Academy and Langholm Primary were established in the 1800s (the original building of which still stands).

The schools run sessions in the community with various groups such as Wild Eskdale and Outpost Arts to expand and improve pupils' skills and community interests.

== Sport ==
In 1858 Langholm Cricket Club was founded. The club play their matches on the Castleholm Ground. They currently play their matches in the Border League.

In 1871, Langholm RFC was founded, being the oldest Rugby club in the Borders. Langholm RFC play in East Regional League Division One and in the Border League.

Langholm also has an amateur football team, Langholm Legion, who play on the Scholars 3G. They compete in the Border Amateur Football Association Division B.

Langholm Scouts (2nd Dumfriesshire) has been running for many decades, with some members attending the biggest events in Scouting, including the World Scout Jamboree and Blair Atholl Jamborette.

== Arts and leisure ==
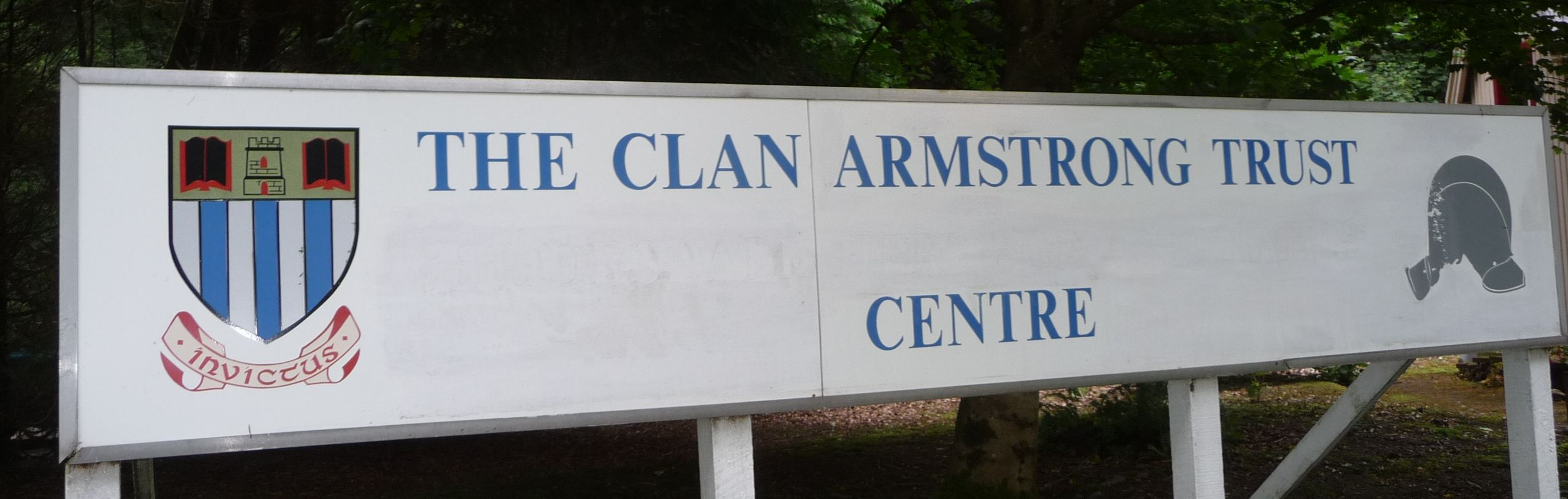
The Clan Armstrong Trust Centre

The Buccleuch Centre is a well-equipped venue, providing a regular programme of music and theatre.

The town is home to a music and arts festival, a food festival and the Langholm walks. Each year the annual Common Riding takes place on the last Friday of July and features horse riding, sports, dancing and musical processions by the Pipe and Town Bands.

Langholm has both a pipe band and a brass band (known as the Town Band, or colloquially as The Toon Ban'). The Town Band is the oldest continuous brass band in Scotland and has won many national awards.

The town is also home to the Eskdale and Liddesdale Archaeological Society.

The Langholm Archive Group has a collection of information, photographs etc. about the locality.

== Langholm Project ==
The 'Langholm Project' or 'Langholm Study' is a reference to the Joint Raptor Study, a scientific study undertaken in the 1990s on Langholm Moor into the effects of raptors on red grouse populations. This was a large-scale project involving a range of organisations including Game Conservancy Trust, CEH (or ITE as they were then known) and Buccleuch estates. The project was followed by a two-year study on the effects of supplementary feeding of harriers, which ended in 1999. The findings of the study and the effect on the moor have been the subject of much debate. In 2007 the Scottish Government announced a further 10-year project with the following aims:

- aim to establish a commercially viable driven grouse moor. Within the time frame of the project, it is the intention to sell driven grouse days producing an annual income in excess of £100,000.
- aim to restore an important site for nature conservation to favourable condition
- seek to demonstrate whether the needs of an economically viable grouse moor can be met alongside the conservation needs of protected raptors, especially the hen harrier.

This more recent study is officially titled The Langholm Moor Demonstration Project, but like its predecessor it is generally known as 'the Langholm Project'. The current project is a joint venture between Buccleuch Estates, Scottish Natural Heritage, Game & Wildlife Conservation Trust, RSPB and Natural England.

== See also ==
- Duke of Buccleuch
