= Langholm Academy =

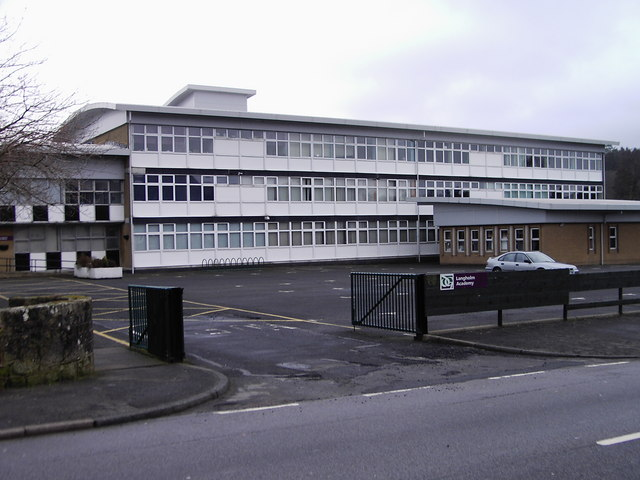

Location
- Langholm; Scotland
- Coordinates: _ type:edu 55.153°N 3.003°W

Information
- School type: Secondary school
- Established: March 1876
- Head teacher: L McLean-Gill

Langholm Academy is a non-denominational, co-educational six-year comprehensive secondary school in Langholm, Scotland.

Currently, the school has 240 pupils. The current building was opened in 1962.

The academy is associated with two primary schools: Langholm and Canonbie.
