= Duncan Glen =

Scottish poet and academic (1933–2008)

Professor Duncan Munro Glen (11 January 1933 – 20 September 2008) was a Scottish poet, literary editor and Emeritus Professor of Visual Communication at Nottingham Trent University. He became known with his first full-length book, Hugh MacDiarmid and the Scottish Renaissance. His many verse collections included from Kythings and other poems (1969), In Appearances (1971), Realities Poems (1980), Selected Poems 1965–1990 (1991), Selected New Poems 1987–1996 (1998) and Collected Poems 1965–2005 (2006). His Autobiography of a Poet appeared with Ramsay Head Press in 1986. He edited Akros magazine for 51 numbers from August 1965 to October 1983. His work to promote Scottish poets and artists included Hugh MacDiarmid and Ian Hamilton Finlay, among others. Some of his poetry was translated into Italian.

== Early life and career ==
Glen was born in Westburn, Cambuslang, South Lanarkshire, Scotland, the son of a white-collar worker in The Steel Company of Scotland, Hallside, near Newton Station. He was educated at West Coats Primary School in Cambuslang, then at Rutherglen Academy, but left at 15 to become an office boy and apprentice printer in Glasgow and Kirkcaldy, before studying at Edinburgh College of Art. After national service in the RAF as a photographic interpreter, he became a typographic designer with the HMSO and did freelance typographic design for publishers in London.

Glen then moved into graphic-design education, first at Watford College of Technology. After a brief spell as an editor in Glasgow with Robert Gibson & Sons Ltd, educational publishers, at what was to become Preston Polytechnic, he was appointed Professor of Visual Communication at what would be Nottingham Trent University. Glen served on the Council of National Academic Awards.

Glen founded Akros Publications in 1965, to publish Scottish poetry and literary criticism; from 1965 to 2006 over 250 works appeared under the Akros imprint. They included poetry, critical and historical studies, Akros magazine (51 issues) and Zed 2 0 (19 numbers), and fiction by Robert McLellan, John Herdman and others. His aim as editor of Akros magazine was to publish modern Scottish poetry in Scots and English, cutting across the "fighting cliques" of the time. Alongside his own poetry, he produced several studies of Scottish literature, anthologies, and a range of publications in other areas, including a history of typography, the definitive history of Cambuslang, a place for which he retained a affection, and an illustrated history of Kirkcaldy, where he latterly lived.

Glen was elected a Fellow of the Chartered Society of Designers in 1977. In 1974 and 1998 he received awards from the Scottish Arts Council "for services to Scottish literature" and "in recognition of his many years as a publisher and editor and entrepreneurial activities for Scottish literature". In 1991 he received the Howard Sergeant Memorial Award "in recognition of long and devoted services to poetry". In 2000 he was awarded the Honorary Degree of Doctor of Letters by Paisley University.

== Bibliography ==
Works and anthologies produced by Duncan Glen, to be found in the National Library of Scotland and the British Library:

- 21 poems after drawings, etc. by George Hollingworth, et al., 2000
- Antigruppo Palermo, gruppoanti, 1974
- Apprentice angel/Hugh MacDiarmid, 1963
- Autobiography of a poet, 1986
- Bibliography of Scottish poets from Stevenson to 1974 compiled with an introduction by Duncan Glen with a preface by Hugh MacDiarmid, 1974
- Bonnie fechter [sound recording]: Alexander Scott 1920–1989, 1990
- Bright they shine: Cambuslang poetry/by Patrick Hamilton... et al.; with an introduction by Duncan Glen, 2001
- Buits and wellies, or, Sui generis a sequence of poems by Duncan Glen with illustrations by George Hollingworth, 1976
- Christmas fable for Margaret Duncan Glen
- Cled score poems Duncan Glen, 1974
- Clydesdale a sequence o poems by Duncan Glen, 1971
- Clydeside kinsfolk: the lives and times of a typically extended Lowland *Scottish family 1694 to 1994: Cambuslang, *Rutherglen & East Kilbride/by Duncan Glen, 1995
- Collected poems, 1965–2005/by Duncan Glen, 2006
- Echoes: frae classical and Italian poetry/by Duncan Glen, 1992
- Elegies: a selection from 1966–2003/by Duncan Glen, 2006
- Essay in response to critical essays on contemporary Scottish poetry in Akros magazine/George Bruce; edited by Duncan Glen, 2005
- European poetry in Scotland an anthology of translations edited by Peter France & Duncan Glen, 1989
- Evergreen song lyrics : a selection from the poetry of the British Isles & America/chosen by Duncan Glen with commentaries, 2000
- Extended Glen family of Cambuslang, Lanarkshire, Scotland & their descendants 1694–1998/by Duncan Glen, 1998
- Familiar epistles between William Hamilton of Gilbertfield in Cambuslang and Allan Ramsay in Edinburgh: with an extract from William Hamilton of Gilbertfield's version of Blind Harry's Wallace/edited with an introduction by Duncan Glen; with prefaces by R. K. D. Milne and Neil McCallum, 2000
- Feres poems by Duncan Glen, 1971
- Five literati an anon (Scot lit. anti lit. pop) symposium created by Duncan Glen, 1976
- Follow! Follow! Follow! and other poems by Duncan Glen, 1976
- Forward from Hugh MacDiarmid, or, Mostly out of Scotland being fifteen years of Duncan Glen, Akros Publications 1962–1977 by Duncan Glen with a check-list of publications, August 1962 – August 1977, 1977
- Four Scottish poets of Cambuslang & Dechmont Hill, 1626–1990: Patrick Hamilton, Minister at Cambuslang 1626–1645, Lieutenant William Hamilton of Gilbertfield, Cambuslang [c. 1665–1751], John Struthers, born at East Kilbride, and poet of Dechmont [1776–1850 and Duncan Glen, 1996
- Friars of Berwick: a narrative poem in Scots, edited with an introduction by Duncan Glen, 2002
- Gaitherings poems in Scots by Duncan Glen, 1977
- Geeze! a sequence of poems by Duncan Glen, 1985
- Graphic lines, 1975
- Historic Fife Murders at Falkland, St. Andrews & Magus Muir: journeys through Fife between Forth and Tay/by Duncan Glen, 2002
- Hugh Glen and the Victoria Drinking Fountain, Cambuslang: a family memoir, 2005
- Hugh MacDiarmid & Duncan Glen: a prospect from Brownsbank: poems, biographical notes and a bibliography, 1998
- Hugh MacDiarmid, a critical survey edited by Duncan Glen, 1972
- Hugh MacDiarmid, an essay for 11 August 1977
- Hugh MacDiarmid and the Scottish Renaissance, 1964
- Hugh MacDiarmid, or, Out of Langholm and into the World
- Hugh MacDiarmid: rebel poet and prophet. A short note on the occasion of his seventieth birthday, 1962
- Illustrious Fife: literary, historical & architectural pathways & walks, 1998
- In appearances, 1971
- In place of wark, or, Man of art: a sequence in thirty pairts, 1977
- In search of Serif Books, the Stanley Press & Joseph Mardel, publisher of Maurice Lindsay's Hurlygush and Sydney Goodsir Smith's Under the Eildon tree, & taking serious note of William Maclellan & Callum Macdonald: with photographs and illustrations, 2006
- In the small hours, or, To be about to be a poem in thirty parts, 1984
- Individual and the twentieth-century Scottish literary tradition, 1971
- Inextinguishable part 14 of realities poems, 1977
- Ither sangs, 1978
- John Atman and other poems; with an introduction by Leonard Mason, 2001
- Journey into Scotland: poems, 1991
- Journey past – a sequence of poems, 1971
- Keepsake for New Year 2000 from Akros Publications: poems, 2000
- Kirkcaldy: a new illustrated history, 2004
- Kirkcaldy: a photographic guide and introduction to the history of the town, 2005
- Lanark & the Falls of Clyde...: Lanarkshire past and present, a rediscovery & anthology, 2001
- Literary masks of Hugh MacDiarmid. [Illustrated], 1964
- Long Calderwood, old East Kilbride; and its associations with John & William Hunter and the poetry of Anne Hunter, Joanna Baillie & John Struthers, with a selection of poems by Anne Hunter and Joanna Baillie, 2005
- Makars' walk. Walks in the old town of Edinburgh, with an anthology of poetry selected and walked by Duncan Glen, 1990
- Morning taken with the sun : an anthology of poems in short shining stanzas/[selection and design, Duncan Glen], 2001
- Mr & Mrs J. L. Stoddart at home, a poem by Duncan Glen, 1975
- Nation in a parish: a new historical prospect of Scotland from the parish of Cambuslang, 1995
- New history of Cambuslang, 1998
- Nottingham: a poem, 1984
- Nuova poesia Scozzese/[edited by] Duncan Glen, [translated by] Nat Scammacca, 1976
- Nuova Scozia : undici poesie di Duncan Glen/scelte e tradotte dallo scozzese da Enzo Bonventre, 1996
- Of marks & memories : a gallimaufry of printers', publishers' and others' marks, devices, emblems, crests, arms, symbols or logos, 2005
- Of philosophers and tinks. A sequence of poems, 1977
- On midsummer evenin merriest of nichts? 1981
- Orchardlands & Avondale & Bothwell...: Lanarkshire past and present, a rediscovery & anthology, 2001
- Out to the Calf of Man, September 1989: a poem and etchings, 1990
- Photographic celebration at the ruins of Bighty Farm, 2002
- Poems in Scots Hugh MacDiarmid [edited by Duncan Glen], 1963
- Poems on art works: a selection by Duncan Glen, 2003
- Poetry of the Scots: an introduction and bibliographical guide to poetry in Gaelic, Scots, Latin and English, 1991
- Poets & paintings : reinterpretations: an essay, 2003
- Preston Polytechnic poets : Duncan Glen, Ian Harrow, Philip Pacey, Hugh Probyn/edited by Duncan Glen; with illustrations by John Hodkinson, 1977
- Preston's new buildings by John Brook and Duncan Glen with photographs by Myra Jones and John Brook, 1975
- Printing type designs : a new history from Gutenberg to 2000, 2001
- Querencia: saggio di traduzione poetica/Enzo Bonventre, 1994
- Ravenscraig Castle: with illustrations of Pathhead, Sinclairtown & Dysart, 2001
- Realities poems by Duncan Glen, 1980
- Robert Louis Stevenson and the Covenanters on the Bass Rock & 'The tale of Tod Lapraik', 2002
- Ruined rural Fife churches/photographed and introduced by Duncan Glen, with a selection of photographs of other ruined buildings, 2002
- Ruins of Newark Castle, St. Monans, autumn 2002/introduced and photographed by Duncan Glen, 2003
- Scottish literary periodicals: three essays/David Finkelstein, Margery Palmer McCulloch, Duncan Glen, 1998
- Scottish literature: a new history from 1299 to 1999, 1999
- Scottish poetry now as seen from London by Simon Foster, 1966
- Seasons of delight: an anthology of poems on gardens, flowers, greenwoods & the sea/compiled and edited by Duncan Glen & Margaret Glen, 1998
- Selected elegies: poems with photographs/by Duncan Glen, 2001
- Selected essays of Hugh MacDiarmid edited with an introduction by Duncan Glen, 1969
- Selected new poems: nineteen-eighty-seven to nineteen-ninety-six, 1998
- Selected poems 1965–1990, 1991
- Selected Scottish and other essays/by Duncan Glen; with an introduction by John Herdman, 1999
- Seventeen poems, 1997
- Situations – a sequence of poems by Duncan Glen with illustrations by Derek Carruthers, 1984
- Something of the night and of the sun/[selection and design, Duncan Glen] 2001
- Splendid Lanarkshire: past and present: a rediscovery and anthology of prose & verse/written and compiled by Duncan Glen, 1997
- Spoiled for choice poems by Duncan Glen, 1976
- The State of Scotland, a poem by Duncan Glen, 1983
- Stevenson's Scotland/edited by Tom Hubbard & Duncan Glen, 2003
- Stones of time. A sequence of poems by Duncan Glen, 1984
- Sunny summer Sunday afternoon in the park? 1969
- Tales to be told – poems by Duncan Glen, 1987
- Ten bird sangs by Duncan Glen, 1978
- Ten sangs by Duncan Glen, 1978
- Ten sangs of luve by Duncan Glen, 1978
- "This is no can of beans": a prospect from the window of a small-press publisher by Duncan Glen], 1999
- Three/trittico translators of poems by Duncan Glen: Nat Scammacca, Enzo Bonventre, Marco Scalabrino: Scots and English, Italiano and Siciliano, 2001
- Traivellin man. A sequence of poems by Duncan Glen with frontispiece by John Hodkinson, 1977
- Trittico scozzese : Duncan Glen, J. K. Annand, Hugh MacDiarmid/cura e traduzione dallo Scots di Enzo Bonventre; traduzione in siciliano di Marco Scalabrino, 2001
- Turn of the earth a sequence of poems by Duncan Glen, 1985
- Twenty of the best: [and one more for good measure]: a Galliard anthology of contemporary Scottish poetry/edited by Duncan Glen; with drawings by Alfons Bytautas, 1990
- Unnerneath the bed/a poem by Duncan Glen, 1970
- Upper Clydesdale...: Lanarkshire past and present, a rediscovery & anthology/by Duncan Glen, 2001
- Weddercock; or, Tale of the ill-taen caller at Easter Greenlees Ferm on 3 August 1910 a poem by Duncan Glen, 1976
- Whither Scotland? a prejudiced look at the future of a nation. Edited by Duncan Glen, 1971
- William Maclellan's Scottish journal/images chosen and introduced by Duncan Glen, 2004
- William Williamson: Kirkcaldy architect by Duncan Glen, 2008
- Winter: a poem: and other verses/by James Thomson; edited with an introductory essay by Duncan Glen, 2002

== Reviews ==
- N. S. Thompson, 1980, review of Realities Poems: Cencrastus No. 4, Winter 1980–1881, p. 40, ISSN 0264-0856
- Cairns Craig, 1984, Lourd on My Hert, which includes a review of The State of Scotland: A Poem. Sheila G. Hearn, ed., Cencrastus No. 15, New Year 1984, pp. 54 and 55, ISSN 0264-0856
