= Hugh MacDiarmid =

Scottish poet (1892–1978)

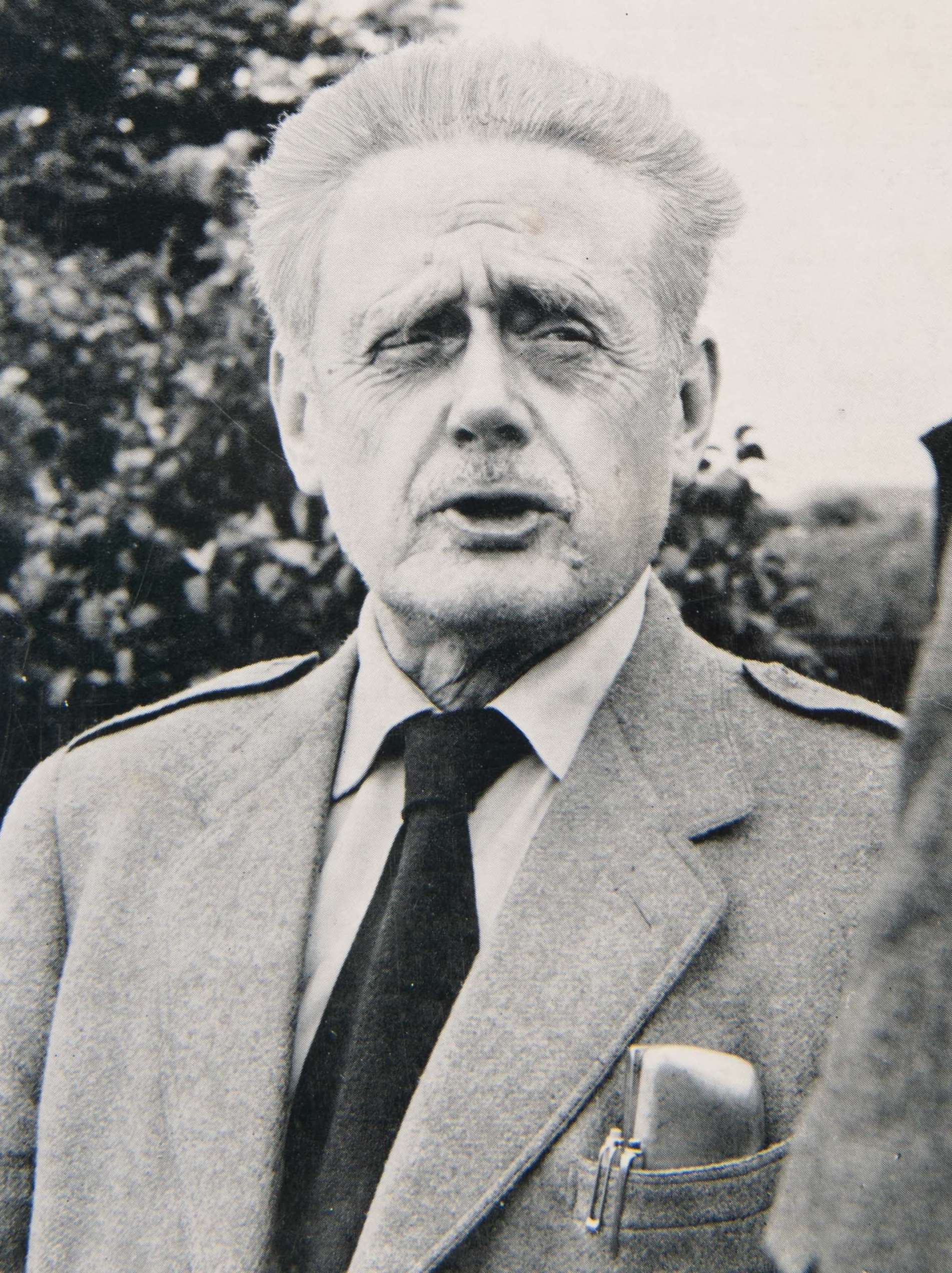
- MacDiarmid, c. 1966
- Born: Christopher Murray Grieve; 11 August 1892; Langholm, Dumfriesshire, Scotland
- Died: 9 September 1978 (aged 86); Edinburgh, Scotland
- Occupation: Poet
- Writing career
- Notable work: A Drunk Man Looks at the Thistle
- Movement: Scottish Renaissance

Christopher Murray Grieve (11 August 1892 – 9 September 1978), best known by his pen name Hugh MacDiarmid (/məkˈdɜːrmɪd/ mək-DUR-mid; Scots: [ˈhju məkˈdjɑrmɪd]), was a Scottish poet, journalist, essayist and political figure. He is considered one of the principal forces behind the Scottish Renaissance and has had a lasting impact on Scottish culture and politics. He was a founding member of the National Party of Scotland in 1928 but left in 1933 due to his Marxist–Leninist views. He joined the Communist Party of Great Britain the following year only to be expelled in 1938 for his nationalist sympathies. He subsequently stood as a parliamentary candidate for both the Scottish National Party (1945) and Communist Party of Great Britain (1964).

Grieve's earliest poetry was written in English, but he is best known for his use of "synthetic Scots", a literary version of the Scots language that he himself developed. From the early 1930s onwards MacDiarmid made greater use of English, sometimes a "synthetic English" that was supplemented by scientific and technical vocabularies.

The son of a postman, MacDiarmid was born in the Scottish border town of Langholm, Dumfriesshire. He was educated at Langholm Academy before becoming a teacher for a brief time at Broughton Higher Grade School in Edinburgh. He began his writing career as a journalist in Wales, contributing to the socialist newspaper The Merthyr Pioneer run by Labour party founder Keir Hardie before joining the Royal Army Medical Corps at the outbreak of the First World War. He served in Salonica, Greece and France before developing cerebral malaria and subsequently returning to Scotland in 1918. MacDiarmid's time in the army was influential in his political and artistic development.

After the war he continued to work as a journalist, living in Montrose where he became editor and reporter of the Montrose Review as well as a justice of the peace and a member of the county council. In 1923 his first book, Annals of the Five Senses, was published at his own expense, followed by Sangschaw in 1925, and Penny Wheep. A Drunk Man Looks at the Thistle, published in 1926, is generally regarded as MacDiarmid's most famous and influential work.

Moving to the Shetland island of Whalsay in 1933 with his son Michael and second wife, Valda Trevlyn, MacDiarmid continued to write essays and poetry and maintain an active correspondence with other intellectuals. He made visits to other parts of Scotland and in May 1934 George Elder Davie introduced him to the Gaelic poet Sorley MacLean in Rutherford's Bar in Drummond Street, Edinburgh. MacLean assisted MacDiarmid by translating seven Gaelic poems into English for his Golden Treasury of Scottish Poetry (1940).

In 1978, MacDiarmid give a reading at a celebration in East Kilbride to mark the 650th anniversary of the Declaration of Arbroath and attended the launch of the literary magazine The Chapman.

MacDiarmid died at his cottage Brownsbank, near Biggar, in 1978 at the age of 86.

As well as being a Scottish nationalist, MacDiarmid was, at different times in his life, a supporter of fascism, and Stalinism, views that often put him at acrimonious odds with his contemporaries. He rejected fascism in the 1930s as a result of developing international events. He was a founding member of the National Party of Scotland, forerunner to the modern Scottish National Party. He stood as a candidate for the Scottish National Party in 1945 and 1950, and for the Communist Party of Great Britain in 1964. In 1949, MacDiarmid's opinions led George Orwell to include his name in a list of "those who should not be trusted" to MI5. Today, MacDiarmid's work is credited with inspiring a new generation of writers. Fellow poet Edwin Morgan said of him: "Eccentric and often maddening genius he may be, but MacDiarmid has produced many works which, in the only test possible, go on haunting the mind and memory and casting Coleridgean seeds of insight and surprise."

== Biography ==
=== Early life ===
Grieve was born in Langholm in 1892. His father was a postman; his family lived above the town library, giving MacDiarmid access to books from an early age. Grieve attended Langholm Academy and, from 1908, Broughton Junior Student Centre in Edinburgh, where he studied under George Ogilvie who introduced him to the magazine The New Age. He left the school on 27 January 1911, following the theft of some books and postage stamps. His father died eight days later, on 3 February 1911.

Following Grieve's departure from Broughton, Ogilvie arranged for Grieve to be employed as a journalist with the Edinburgh Evening Dispatch. He lost the job later in 1911, but on 20 July of that year he had his first article, "The Young Astrology", published in The New Age. In October 1911, Grieve moved to Ebbw Vale in Monmouthshire, Wales where he worked as a newspaper reporter; by 1913 he had returned to Scotland and was working for the Clydebank and Renfrew Press in Clydebank, near Glasgow. It was here that Grieve first encountered the work of John Maclean, Neil Malcolm Maclean, and James Maxton.

=== First World War ===
In July 1915 Grieve left the town of Forfar in eastern Scotland and travelled to the Hillsborough Barracks in Sheffield. He was there during the Easter Rising in Ireland in 1916, and Alan Bold and Walter Perrie have both drawn attention to the profound influence of the struggle for Irish independence and the literary and cultural movement associated with it on his perspective as a Scottish nationalist. He went on to serve in the Royal Army Medical Corps in Salonica, Greece and France during the First World War. After the war, he married and returned to journalism.

=== Return to Scotland ===
MacDiarmid's first book, Annals of the Five Senses, was a mixture of prose and poetry written in English, and was published in 1923 while MacDiarmid was living in Montrose. At about this time MacDiarmid turned to Scots for a series of books, culminating in what is probably his best known work, the book-length A Drunk Man Looks at the Thistle. This poem is widely regarded as one of the most important long poems in 20th-century Scottish literature. After that, he published several books containing poems in both English and Scots.

=== Time in England ===
From 1929 to 1930 MacDiarmid lived in London, and worked for Compton Mackenzie's magazine Vox. MacDiarmid lived in Liverpool from 1930 to 1931, before returning to London; he left again in 1932, and lived in the village of Thakeham in West Sussex until he returned to Scotland in 1932.

=== Whalsay, Shetland ===
MacDiarmid lived in Sodom on the island of Whalsay, Shetland, from 1933 until 1942. He often asked the local fishermen to take him out in their boats and once asked them to leave him on an uninhabited island for a night and pick him up again in the morning. Local legend has it that he asked about Whalsay words and some of the Whalsay folk made up fantastical words that did not exist. The Shaetlan dialect is strong on the island and any strange words may have sounded plausible. "The often tormented genius wrote much of his finest poetry (including 'On a Raised Beach') and, via the Whalsay post office, conducted furious correspondence with the leading writers and thinkers of his generation." Sorley MacLean visited MacDiarmid on Whalsay in late July and early August 1935.

The croft house that was MacDiarmid's Whalsay home was later made into a camping böd (traditionally a building used to house fishermen and their gear), the Grieves House böd, run by Shetland Amenity Trust. It is in a state of disrepair and "closed for maintenance" as of 2022.

=== Return to the Scottish mainland ===
In 1942 MacDiarmid was directed to war work and moved to Glasgow, where he lived until 1949. Between 1949 and 1951 he lived in a cottage on the grounds of Dungavel House, Lanarkshire, before moving to his final home: "Brownsbank", a cottage in Candymill, near Biggar in Lanarkshire. He died, aged 86, in Edinburgh.

=== Politics and support for Nazi invasion of UK ===
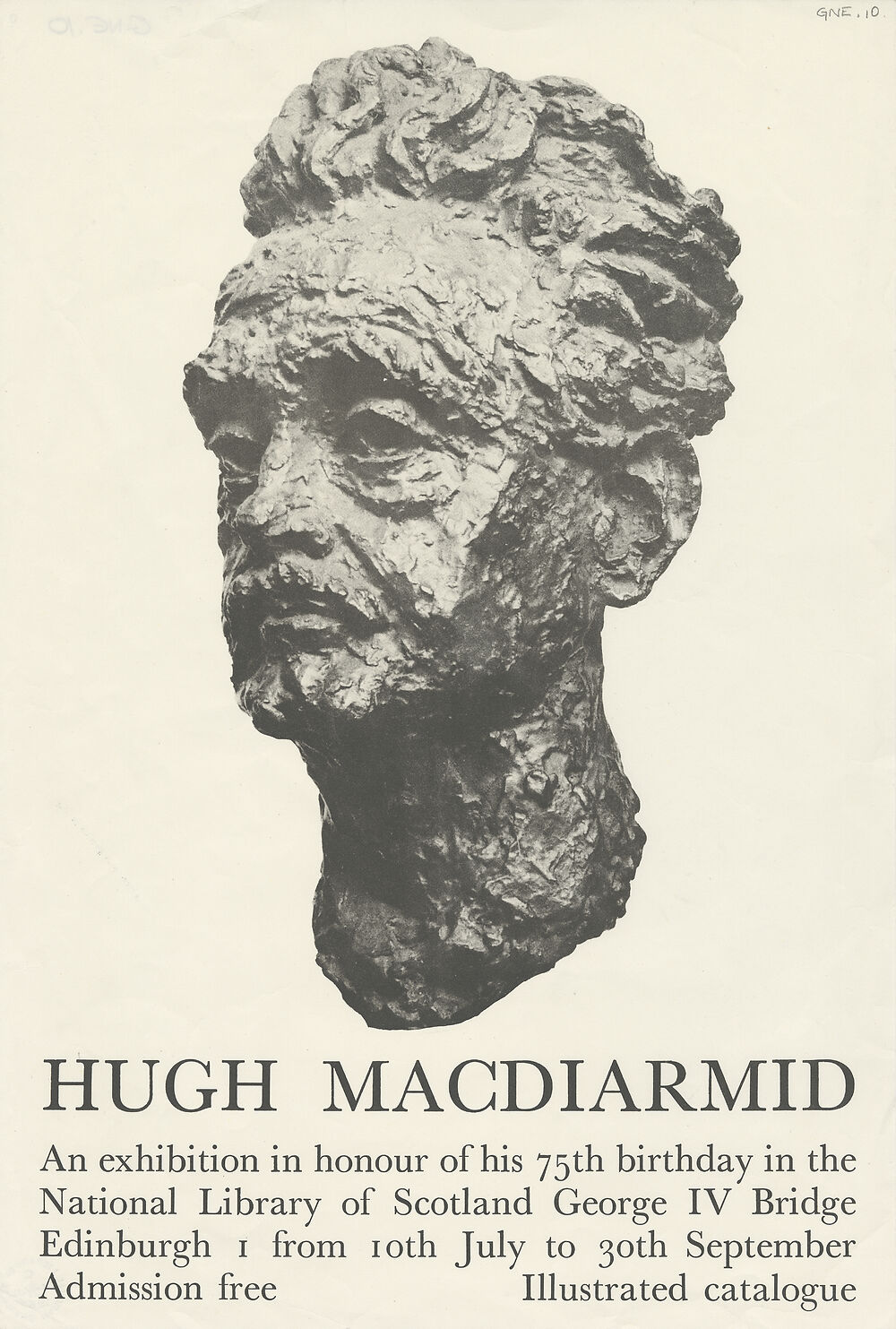
Poster for Hugh MacDiarmid exhibition held at the National Library of Scotland in honour of his 75th birthday in 1967

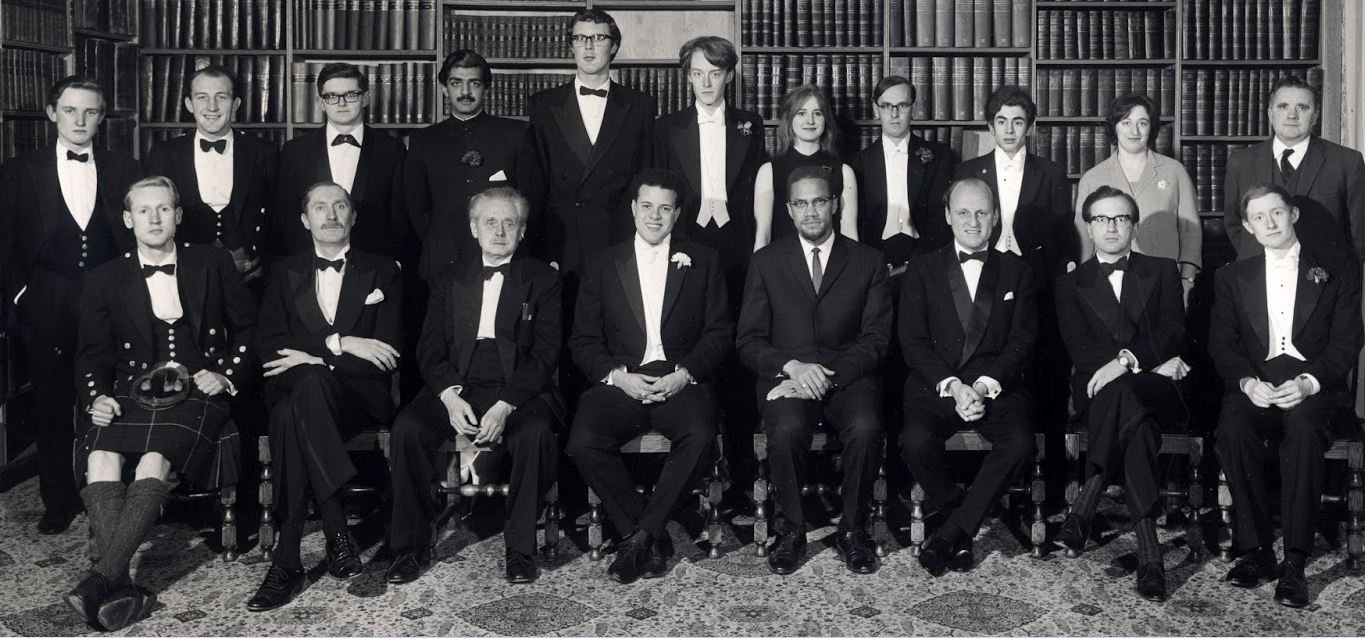
McDiarmid (bottom row, third from left) in a photograph of attendees of Malcolm X's speech at the Oxford Union, 3 December 1964. The two debated that day on the use of force to resist oppression.

In 1928, MacDiarmid helped found the National Party of Scotland, but was expelled during the 1930s. MacDiarmid was at times a member of the Communist Party of Great Britain, but he was expelled twice. John Baglow reports that "his comrades never really knew what to make of him." Indeed, he was expelled from the Communist Party for being a Scottish Nationalist, and from the National Party of Scotland for being a Communist. As a follower of the Scottish revolutionary socialist John Maclean, he saw no contradiction between international socialism and the nationalist vision of a Scottish workers' republic, but this ensured a fraught relationship with organised political parties. MacDiarmid's Scottish nationalism often manifested in open bigotry towards England: he listed "Anglophobia" as one of his recreations in Who's Who. Anticipating the Blitz, MacDiarmid wrote a poem entitled "On The Imminent Destruction Of London, June 1940", where he celebrated the Luftwaffe's potential bombing of London and compared the city to "a foul disease": "death and destruction has gone out from London all over the world".

From 1931, whilst he was in London, until 1943, after he left the Shetland island of Whalsay, MacDiarmid was under surveillance by British counterintelligence operatives. In 1949, George Orwell included MacDiarmid in a list he wrote for the Information Research Department of fellow left-wing writers whom he suspected of sympathies for the Soviet Union or direct links with the Soviet secret police (NKVD). MacDiarmid stood in the Glasgow Kelvingrove constituency in the 1945 and 1950 general elections. He stood against the Conservative Prime Minister Alec Douglas-Home in Kinross and Western Perthshire at the 1964 election, taking only 127 votes.

In 2010 letters were discovered showing that MacDiarmid believed a Nazi invasion of Britain would benefit Scotland. In a letter sent from Whalsay in April 1941, he wrote: "On balance I regard the Axis powers, tho' more violently evil for the time being, less dangerous than our own government in the long run and indistinguishable in purpose." A year earlier, in June 1940, he wrote: "Although the Germans are appalling enough, they cannot win, but the British and French bourgeoisie can and they are a far greater enemy. If the Germans win they could not hold their gain for long, but if the French and British win it will be infinitely more difficult to get rid of them".

MacDiarmid weaponized an accusation of fascism against South African poet Roy Campbell over their differing opinions of the Spanish Civil War, which set off a decades-long and very acrimonious public feud. By the 1930s, however, following Mussolini's lurch to the right, his position had changed and he castigated Neville Chamberlain over his appeasement of Adolf Hitler's expansionism." In response to a discussion of these changes of political position, Deirdre Grieve, MacDiarmid's daughter-in-law and literary executor, noted: "I think he entertained almost every ideal it was possible to entertain at one point or another."

=== Social credit ===
Throughout his life, MacDiarmid was a follower of the economic theory of social credit developed by C. H. Douglas. After being introduced to the idea by Alfred Orage, the editor of The New Age, MacDiarmid was active in social credit groups in the 1930s and publicly espoused the idea on many occasions. Social Credit theory was received well in the National Party of Scotland, but did not become part of the party's platform. MacDiarmid saw no major contradiction between Marxism and social credit and believed in the validity of both theories until his death.

=== Writing ===
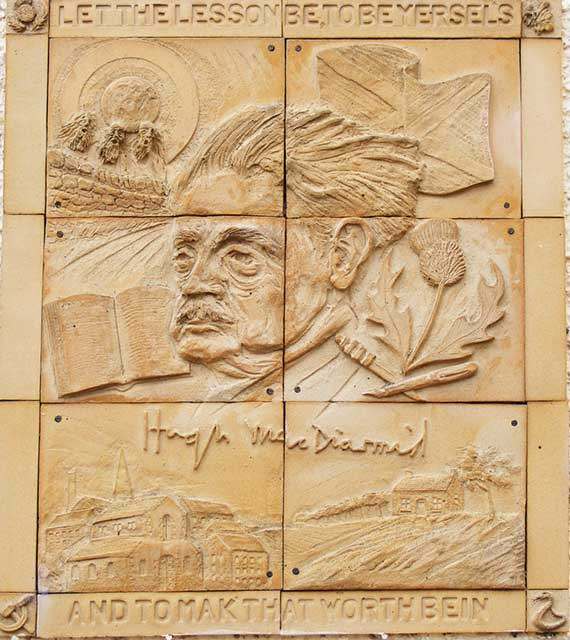
Plaque on a building near Gladstone Court Museum, Biggar, South Lanarkshire which was opened by MacDiarmid in 1968. The inscription reads "Let the lesson be – to be yersel's and to mak' that worth bein'". Sculpted by Douglas Robertson 1995.

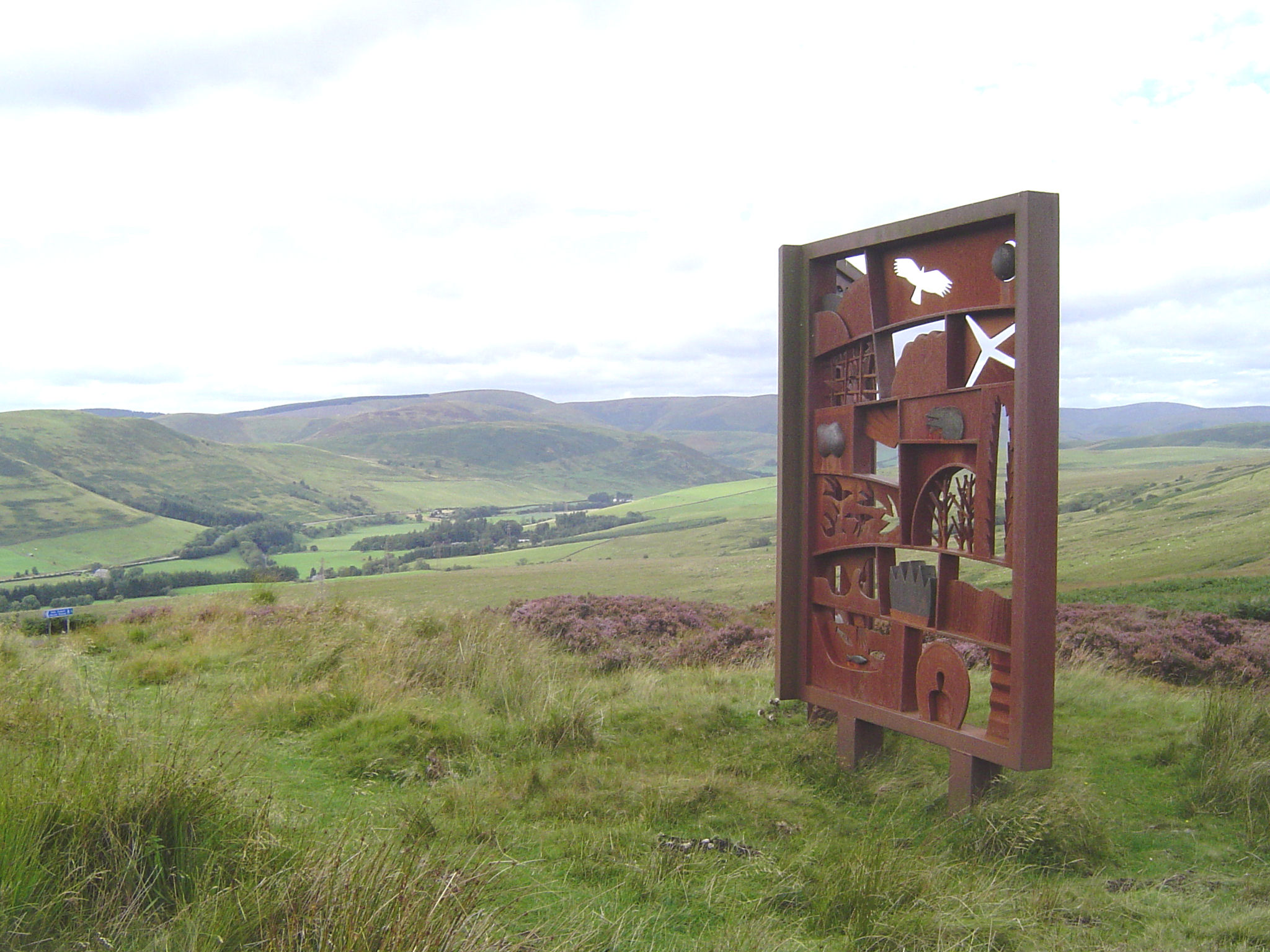
MacDiarmid Memorial near Langholm

Much of the work that MacDiarmid published in the 1920s was written in what he termed "Synthetic Scots": a version of the Scots language that "synthesised" multiple local dialects, which MacDiarmid constructed from dictionaries and other sources.

From the 1930s onwards, MacDiarmid turned increasingly to English as a means of expression and most of his later poetry was written in that language. His ambition was to live up to Rilke's dictum that 'the poet must know everything' and to write poetry that contained all knowledge. As a result, many of the poems in Stony Limits (1934) and later volumes are a kind of found poetry reusing text from a range of sources. Just as he had used John Jamieson's dialect dictionary for his poems in 'synthetic Scots', so he used Chambers Twentieth Century Dictionary for poems such as 'On a Raised Beach'. Other poems, including 'On a Raised Beach' and 'Etika Preobrazhennavo Erosa' used extensive passages of prose. This practice, particularly in the poem 'Perfect', led to accusations of plagiarism from supporters of the Welsh poet Glyn Jones, to which MacDiarmid's response was 'The greater the plagiarism the greater the work of art.' The great achievement of this late poetry is to attempt on an epic scale to capture the idea of a world without God in which all the facts the poetry deals with are scientifically verifiable. In his critical work Lives of the Poets, Michael Schmidt notes that Hugh MacDiarmid 'had redrawn the map of Scottish poetry and affected the whole configuration of English literature'.

MacDiarmid wrote a number of non-fiction prose works, including Scottish Eccentrics and his autobiography Lucky Poet. He also did a number of translations from Scottish Gaelic, including Duncan Ban MacIntyre's Praise of Ben Dorain, which were well received by native speakers, including Sorley MacLean.

=== Personal life ===
He had a daughter, Christine, and a son, Walter, by his first wife Peggy Skinner. He had a son, James Michael Trevlyn, known as Michael, by his second wife Valda Trevlyn (1906–1989); Michael was a conscientious objector to post-World War II National Service and became vice chair of the Scottish National Party.

=== Places of interest ===
MacDiarmid grew up in the Scottish town of Langholm in Dumfriesshire. The town is home to a monument in his honour made of cast iron which takes the form of a large open book depicting images from his writings.

MacDiarmid lived in Montrose for a time where he worked for the local newspaper the Montrose Review.

MacDiarmid also lived on the isle of Whalsay in Shetland, in Sodom (Sudheim). The house is now one of Shetland's 'Camping Bods', offering basic, bothy-style accommodation to visitors.

Brownsbank Cottage, near Biggar, South Lanarkshire, the home of MacDiarmid and his wife Valda from 1952 until their deaths, has been restored by the Biggar Museum Trust.

Hugh MacDiarmid is commemorated in Makars' Court, outside the Writers' Museum, Lawnmarket, Edinburgh. Selections for Makars' Court are made by the Writers' Museum, the Saltire Society and the Scottish Poetry Library.

=== Artistic portrayals of MacDiarmid ===
Hugh MacDiarmid sat for sculptor Alan Thornhill and a bronze was acquired by the National Portrait Gallery. The terracotta original is held in the collection of the artist. The correspondence file relating to the MacDiarmid bust is held in the archive of the Henry Moore Foundation's Henry Moore Institute in Leeds.

Filmmaker and poet Margaret Tait made a film Hugh MacDiarmid, A Portrait (1964) when the poet was seventy-one which novelist Ali Smith describes as 'a model of versatility, a meld of voice and image each illuminating the other'. The poems heard read by MacDiarmid are 'You Know Not Who I Am', 'Somersault', 'Krang' and some lines from 'The Kind of Poetry I Want'. Writing of MacDiarmid and Tait, academic Sarah Neely notes 'MacDiarmid was also a champion of Tait's work as a film-maker and poet; he published a few of her poems and also organised a screening of her films at the Dunedin Society'.

=== Poetry ===
- Sangschaw (1925)
- Penny Wheep (1926)
- A Drunk Man Looks at the Thistle (1926)
- The Lucky Bag (1927)
- To Circumjack Cencrastus (1930)
- First Hymn to Lenin and Other Poems (1931)
- Second Hymn to Lenin (1932)
- Scots Unbound and Other Poems (1932)
- Stony Limits and Other Poems (1934)
- The Birlinn of Clanranald (1935)
- Second Hymn to Lenin and Other Poems (1935)
- Speaking for Scotland: Selected Poems of Hugh MacDiarmid (1946)
- Poems of the East-West Synthesis (1946)
- A Kist of Whistles (1947)
- In Memoriam James Joyce (1955)
- Three Hymns to Lenin (1957)
- The Battle Continues (1958)
- The Kind of Poetry I Want (1961)
- Collected Poems (1962)
- Poems to Paintings by William Johnstone 1933 (1963)
- A Lap of Honour (1967)
- Early Lyrics (1968)
- A Clyack-Sheaf (1969)
- More Collected Poems (1970)
- Selected Poems (1971)
- The Hugh MacDiarmid Anthology: Poems in Scots and English (1972)
- Dìreadh (1974)
- The Complete Poems of Hugh MacDiarmid Volume 1 & 2 (1978)

=== Unpublished concepts ===
MacDiarmid's career – and especially his later career – is characterised by proposals for long poems, often themselves made up of multiple volumes, each of which could be considered a long poem in its own right.

For example, the critic W. N. Herbert reconstructs a project of MacDiarmid's called Mature Art, concluding that it “could be described as a six-volume poem consisting of the Cornish Heroic Song …, The Red Lion (reassembled from Second Hymn, the ‘Hitherto Uncollected Section’ of the Complete Poems, and the ‘Third Hymn’), The Battle Continues, The Kind of Poetry I Want, and In Memoriam more or less as printed, and Impavidi Progrediamur according to the parameters defined by the broadcast", i.e., the version of the poem that had been read on the BBC radio Third Programme on 19 December 1956.

=== Letters ===
- Bold, Alan. The Letter of Hugh MacDiarmid
- Kerrigan, Catherine. The Hugh MacDiarmid-George Ogilvie Letters
- Wilson, Susan R. The Correspondence Between Hugh MacDiarmid and Sorley Maclean

Also see:

- Manson, John. Dear Grieve: Letters to Hugh MacDiarmid (C. M. Grieve)
- Junor, Beth. Scarcely Ever Out of My Thoughts: The Letters of Valda Trevlyn Grieve to Christopher Murray Grieve (Hugh MacDiarmid)

=== Anthologies edited by MacDiarmid ===
- The Golden Treasury of Scottish Poetry (1940)

=== Other ===
- The Scottish Chapbook (August 1922 to December 1923): short-lived little magazine that published some of MacDiarmid's earliest poetry, as well as introductions (styled by MacDiarmid as "Causeries") that outline a theoretical basis for MacDiarmid's literary project. The most important of these introductions is the three-part "A Theory of Scots Letters", published across three issues of the Chapbook between February and April, 1923.
- Annals of the Five Senses (1923)
- Plea for a Scottish Fascism (1923)
- Programme for a Scottish Fascism (1923)
- Contemporary Scottish Studies (1926–)
- Scottish Scene (1934) (collaboration with Lewis Grassic Gibbon)
- Scottish Eccentrics (1938)
- The Islands of Scotland (1939)
- Lucky Poet (1943)
- The Company I've Kept (1966)
- The Uncanny Scot (1968)
