= Modern Scottish Poetry =

1946 poetry anthology

First edition

Modern Scottish Poetry: An Anthology of the Scottish Renaissance 1920-1945 was a poetry anthology edited by Maurice Lindsay, and published in 1946 by Faber and Faber.

It covered the Scottish Renaissance literary movement in Scotland, featuring works written in English, Scots and Gaelic, and was important in bringing the Scottish poets of the time to wider international attention.

The anthology went through subsequent editions published in 1966, 1976 and 1986.

== Poets in Modern Scottish Poetry (1946) ==
Margot Robert Adamson - Marion Angus - George Bruce - Helen B. Cruickshank - Adam Drinan - John Ferguson - G. S. Fraser - Robert Garioch - W. S. Graham - Alexander Gray - George Campbell Hay - J. F. Hendry - Violet Jacob - William Jeffrey - Maurice Lindsay - Norman MacCaig - Hugh MacDiarmid - Pittendrigh MacGillivray - Albert MacKie - Hamish Maclaren - Sorley MacLean - Robert MacLellan - Donald MacRae - William Montgomerie - Edwin Muir - R. Crombie Saunders - Tom Scott - Ann Scott-Moncrieff - Donald Sinclair - Sydney Goodsir Smith - William Soutar - Lewis Spence - Muriel Stuart - Ruthven Todd - Andrew Young - Douglas Young

== Additional in the 1966 edition ==
D. M. Black - George Mackay Brown - Stewart Conn - Ian Hamilton Finlay - Robin Fulton - Edwin Morgan - Alastair Reid - Alexander Scott - Burns Singer - Iain Crichton Smith - Derick Thomson - Sydney Tremayne - W. Price Turner

== See also ==
- 1946 in poetry
- 1966 in poetry
- 1946 in literature
- 1966 in literature
- 20th century in literature
- 20th century in poetry
- Scottish literature
- List of poetry anthologies
