= List of compositions by Erik Chisholm =

This is a list of compositions by Erik Chisholm (1904–1965).

== Ballets ==
- The Forsaken Mermaid, 1936
- The Pied Piper of Hamelin, 1937
- The Earth Shapers, 1941
- The Hoodie Craw, 1948
- The Piobaireachd
- A Woodland Tale
- Polish Woman

== Operas ==
- The Feast of Samhain, 1941
- The Inland Woman, 1951 (based on Mary Lavin's 'The Green Death and the Black Death')
- Dark Sonnet, 1952 (based on the play 'Before Breakfast' by Eugene O'Neill)
- Black roses, 1954
- Simoon, 1953 (based on a text by August Strindberg)
- Unnatural Death, 1953
- The Midnight Court, 1954-61 (based on 'A Rhythmical Bacchanalia' by Bryon Merryman)
- The Canterbury Tales, 1961-62 (based on Chaucer's 'Canterbury Tales')
- The Caucasian Chalk Circle, 1963 (based on Berthold Brecht's 'The Caucasian Chalk Circle')
- The Importance of Being Earnest, 1963 (based on Oscar Wilde's play of The Importance of Being Earnest)
- The Life and Loves of Robert Burns, 1963 (based on poems of Burns, and his correspondence with brother Gilbert and other contemporaries)
- The Wolflings

Dark Sonnet, Black roses and Simoon formed the three-act trilogy of Murder in Three Keys.

== Orchestral ==
=== Symphonies ===
- Symphony No. 1 in C minor
- Symphony No. 2, 1939

=== Other orchestral works ===
- Adventures of Babar
- A Celtic Wonder Tale
- Ceol Mor Dances : Version for Orchestra
- Chaconne, 1922
- Dunedin Suite, for strings
- The Enchanted Forest: Prelude for Orchestra
- The Freiris of Berwick
- From The True Edge Of The Great World: Preludes for Orchestra
- From The Western Isles, 1939, for strings
- Hebridia: Orchestral Suite Part 1
- March
- Pictures From Dante, 1948
- Prelude in G
- Rhapsody
- Six Celestial Pieces : No 1 - Sirius
- Straloch Suite, 1933
- Straloch Suite for Strings
- Sword Dance
- Two Pieces for String Orchestra, 1929
- A Woodland Tale

=== Concertante ===
- Dance Suite, for piano and orchestra, 1932
- Piano Concerto No.1 Piobaireachd, 1937
- Piano Concerto No.2 On Hindustani Themes, 1948–1949
- Cantos Gitanos, for piano and orchestra
- Concerto for Violin and Orchestra, 1950

== Chamber ==
=== One player ===
- Sonata for Cello Alone, 1930
- Sonata for Solo Viola
- Sonata for Solo Violin, 1930

=== Two players ===
- Gavotte, for violin and piano, 1934
- Morris Dance, for violin and piano
- A Scotch Tit-Bit, for violin and piano
- Sonata for 2 Violoncellos
- Three Miniatures, for cello and piano
- Three Short Pieces for Clarinet and Piano, 1960

=== Four players ===
- A Highland Stream, quartet for flute, clarinet, cello and triangle
- Sorrow for a Queen (after Maeterlink) : Version for Brass Quartet
- Three Pieces for String Quartet : No 1 - Idyll
- Three Pieces for String Quartet
- Three Scottish Lullabies, string quartet

=== Five players ===
- Ceol Mor Dances, quintet for four pianos and percussion
- Sonatina for Woodwind Quintet
- Three Dances, quintet for flute, oboe, clarinet, horn and bassoon

=== Six or more players ===
- Double Trio, for clarinet, bassoon, trumpet, violin, cello and double bass
- Allegro, for clarinet, bassoon, trumpet, percussion, violin and cello
- Gipsy, for flute, oboe, clarinet, bassoon, horn, two violins, viola and cello
- Sarabande, for flute, oboe, clarinet, bassoon, horn and timpani

== Piano ==
=== One piano ===
- Sonata in A: An Riobain Dearg (The Red Robin)
- The Piobroch Sonatina
- Sonatine Ecossaise
- Night Song of the Bards, six nocturnes for piano
- All Quiet on the Western Front, a sonata in three movements
- Honeycombs; for the Children, pianoforte suite
- Perthshire Airs
- Highland Sketches
- G minor Sonatina, 1922
- Sonatina No.4
- Elegies Nos. 1-4
- With Cloggs On
- Collection of Piano solos, Ceol Mor, which reflect Highland bagpipe tunes known as Piobaireachd
  - Lord Lovat's Lament
  - Maclean of Cole putting his Foot on the Neck of his Enemy
  - Duntroon Pibroch
  - Mackenzie of Applecross
  - The Macgregors
  - The Chisholm
  - MacCrimmon's Lament
  - Lament for King James
  - Cluig Pheairt
  - No. 16
  - Too Long in this Condition
  - A Lament for the Harp Tree
  - Squinting Patrick's Flame of Wrath

=== Two pianos ===
- Piano Concerto No 2 : On Hindustani Themes : arranged for 2 Pianos

== Vocal ==
=== Songs with orchestra ===
- Dismal is this Life for Me (tenor)
- The Minde's Melody (female chorus)
- Mungo (bass solo with chorus)
- O Son Of God It Is A Great Grief (tenor with piano)
- Pageant of Music for the People, 1939 (chorus)
- There Was a Time When I Thought Far Sweeter (tenor)
- Though You Like to Drink Your Ale (tenor)

=== Songs with piano ===
- The Bee
- Blossoms
- The Blue-Bird
- The Braw Plum (William Soutar)
- Celtic Folk Songs
- A Celtic Song Book
- The Chailleach (Patrick MacDonald) [baritone]
- Cradle-Croon (Yeats)
- Cradle Song (Version 2), 1926
- A Dirge for Summer (William Soutar)
- The Donkey, 1923 (G K Chesterton)
- The Fairies, 1923
- I Arose one morning early (Patrick MacDonald) [baritone]
- In The Dark
- Little Boney (1806) : The Sergeant's Song, 1926 [tenor]
- Meditation
- My Ocean Steed, 1923
- The Offending Eye, 1926 (A. E. Housman) [high voice]
- Ossian's Soliloquy (Patrick MacDonald) [baritone]
- Seven Poems of Love (Lillias Scott) [soprano]
  - 'Love's Reward'
  - 'Johnnie Logie'
  - 'Skreigh o' Day'
  - 'Fragment (Lament)'
  - 'Prayer'
  - 'Innocence'
  - 'Hert's Sang'
- She Calls Me Her Coal-Black Mammy
- Sixty Cubic Feet (Randall Swingler) [baritone]
- Skinny Minny
- Snail, Snail, Shoot Out Your Horn
- Summer Song (William Soutar)
- The Prodigy (William Soutar)
- There's a Guid Time Comin' Yet
- The Three Worthies (William Soutar)

=== Unaccompanied songs ===
- Crabbed Age & Youth, 1926
- Cradle Song (Version 1), 1928
- A Highland Dirge [female chorus]
- I Want to Talk to Thee
- In Glasgow Here, 1925
- The Song of the Women, 1928
- Three Revolutionary Songs : Musical Recitative [male chorus]

== Arrangements ==
- Paderewski's Theme Varié for two pianos
- Alkan's Symphonie Op 39 no 4-7 for a string orchestra
- Alkan's Concerto for Piano arranged for solo piano and string orchestra
