= Scottish Renaissance =

Literary movement of the early to mid-20th century

The Scottish Renaissance (Scottish Gaelic: Ath-bheòthachadh na h-Alba; Scots: Scots Renaissance) was a mainly literary movement of the early to mid-20th century that can be seen as the Scottish version of modernism. It is sometimes referred to as the Scottish literary renaissance, although its influence went beyond literature into music, drama, visual arts, and politics (among other fields). Key figures, like Hugh MacDiarmid, Sorley MacLean and other writers and artists of the Scottish Renaissance displayed a profound interest in both modern philosophy and technology, as well as incorporating folk influences, and a strong concern for the fate of Scotland's declining languages.

It has been seen as a parallel to other movements elsewhere, including the Irish Literary Revival, the Harlem Renaissance (in the United States), the Bengal Renaissance (in Kolkata, India) and the Jindyworobak Movement (in Australia), which emphasised indigenous folk traditions.

== Beginnings ==
The term "Scottish Renaissance" was brought into critical prominence by the French Languedoc poet and scholar Denis Saurat in his article "Le Groupe de la Renaissance Écossaise", which was published in the Revue Anglo-Américaine in April 1924. The term had appeared much earlier, however, in the work of the polymathic Patrick Geddes and in a 1922 book review by Christopher Murray Grieve ("Hugh MacDiarmid") for the Scottish Chapbook that predicted a "Scottish Renascence as swift and irresistible as was the Belgian Revival between 1880 and 1910", involving such figures as Lewis Spence and Marion Angus.

These earlier references make clear the connections between the Scottish Renaissance and the Celtic Twilight and Celtic Revival movements of the late 19th century, which helped reawaken a spirit of cultural nationalism among Scots of the modernist generations. Where these earlier movements had been steeped in a sentimental and nostalgic Celticism, however, the modernist-influenced Renaissance would seek a rebirth of Scottish national culture that would both look back to the medieval "makar" poets, William Dunbar and Robert Henryson, as well as look towards such contemporary influences as T. S. Eliot, Ezra Pound, and D. H. Lawrence, or (more locally) R. B. Cunninghame Graham.

The turn of the 20th century saw the first stirrings of a new era in Scottish arts and letters. As writers such as George Douglas Brown railed against the "Kailyard school" that had come to dominate Scottish letters, producing satiric, realist accounts of Scottish rural life in novels like The House with the Green Shutters (1901), Scots language poets such as Violet Jacob and Marion Angus undertook a quiet revival of regionally inflected poetry in the Lowland vernacular. Patrick Geddes would continue his foundational work in civic renewal and town and regional planning, developing the triad "Place - Work - Folk" as a matrix for new thinking about the relationships between people and their local environments. In the realm of visual arts, John Duncan would refine his Celtic myth inspired Symbolist painting to include an increasing emphasis on collage and the flatness of the image. In architecture and the decorative arts, the towering figures of Charles Rennie Mackintosh and the Glasgow Four would give Scotland its very own "school" of modern design and help create the "Glasgow style". Scotland in the early 20th century was experiencing an efflorescence of creative activity, but there was not yet a sense of a particular shared movement or an overt national inflection to all of this artistic effort.

== Literary renaissance ==
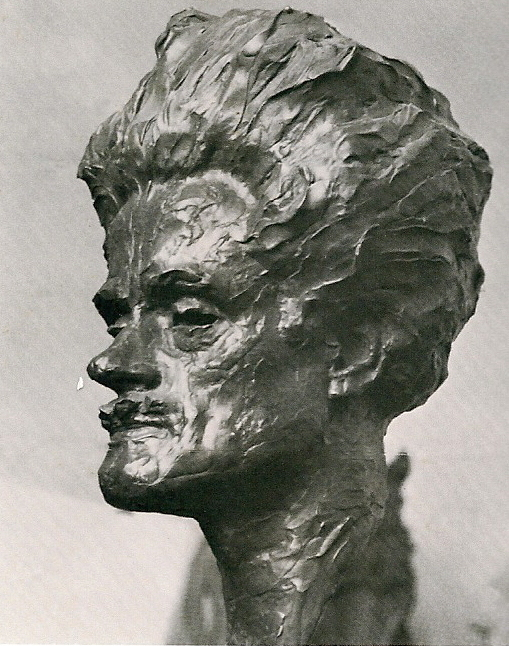
A bust of Hugh MacDiarmid sculpted in 1927 by William Lamb

It was not until the literary efforts of Hugh MacDiarmid that the Scottish Renaissance can properly be said to have begun. Starting in 1920, C. M. Grieve (having not yet adopted his nom de plume of Hugh MacDiarmid) began publishing a series of three short anthologies entitled Northern Numbers: Being Representative Selections from Certain Living Scottish Poets (including works by John Buchan, Violet Jacob, Neil Munro, and Grieve himself). These anthologies, which appeared one each year from 1920–22, along with his founding and editing of the Scottish Chapbook review (in the annus mirabilis of Modernism, 1922), established Grieve/MacDiarmid as the father and central figure of the burgeoning Scottish Renaissance movement that he had prophesied. By about 1925, MacDiarmid had largely abandoned his English language poetry and began to write in a kind of "synthetic Scots" known as Lallans, that was a hybrid of regional Scots dialects and lexicographical artifacts exhumed from Jamieson's Dictionary of the Scottish Language, often grafted onto a Standard English grammatical structure. His poetic works included "A Drunk Man Looks at the Thistle" (1926). This had an electrifying effect on the literary landscape of the time.

Other writers soon followed in MacDiarmid's footsteps and also wrote in Lallans, including the poets Edwin Muir (1887–1959) and William Soutar (1898–1943), who pursued an exploration of identity, rejecting nostalgia and parochialism and engaging with social and political issues. Some writers that emerged after the Second World War followed MacDiarmid by writing in Scots, including Robert Garioch (1909–1981) and Sydney Goodsir Smith (1915–1975). The Glaswegian poet Edwin Morgan (1920–2010) became known for translations of works from a wide range of European languages. He was also the first Scots Makar (the official national poet), appointed by the inaugural Scottish government in 2004. Alexander Gray was an academic and poet, but is chiefly remembered for his translations into Scots from the German and Danish ballad traditions into Scots, including Arrows. A Book of German Ballads and Folksongs Attempted in Scots (1932) and Four-and-Forty. A Selection of Danish Ballads Presented in Scots (1954).

The Scottish Renaissance increasingly concentrated on the novel, particularly after the 1930s when Hugh MacDiarmid was in isolation in Shetland and its leadership moved to novelist Neil Gunn (1891–1973). Gunn's novels, beginning with The Grey Coast (1926), and including Highland River (1937) and The Green Isle of the Great Deep (1943), were largely written in English and not the Scots preferred by MacDiarmid, focused on the Highlands of his birth and were notable for their narrative experimentation. Other major figures associated with the movement include George Blake (1893–1961), A. J. Cronin (1896–1981), Eric Linklater (1899–1974) and Lewis Grassic Gibbon (1901–35). There were also a large number of female authors associated with the movement, who demonstrated a growing feminine consciousness. They included Catherine Carswell (1879–1946), Willa Muir (1890–1970), Nan Shepherd (1893–1981) and most prolifically Naomi Mitchison (1897–1999). All were born within a fifteen-year period and, although they cannot be described as members of a single school, they all pursued an exploration of identity, rejecting nostalgia and parochialism and engaging with social and political issues. Physician A. J. Cronin is now often seen as sentimental, but his early work, particularly his first novel Hatter's Castle (1931) and his most successful The Citadel (1937) were a deliberate reaction against the Kailyard tradition, exposing the hardships and vicissitudes of the lives of ordinary people, He was the most translated Scottish author in the twentieth century. George Blake pioneered the exploration of the experiences of the working class in his major works such as The Shipbuilders (1935). Eric Linklater produced comedies of the absurd including Juan in America (1931) dealing with prohibition America, and a critique of modern war in Private Angelo (1946). Lewis Grassic Gibbon, the pseudonym of James Leslie Mitchell, produced one of the most important realisations of the ideas of the Scottish Renaissance in his trilogy A Scots Quair (Sunset Song, 1932, Cloud Howe, 1933 and Grey Granite, 1934), which mixed different Scots dialects with the narrative voice. Other works that investigated the working class included James Barke's (1905–58), Major Operation (1936) and The Land of the Leal (1939) and J. F. Hendry's (1912–86) Fernie Brae (1947).

The parallel revitalisation of Gaelic poetry, known as the Scottish Gaelic Renaissance, was largely due to the work of Sorley Maclean (Somhairle MacGill-Eain, 1911–96). A native of Skye and a native Gaelic speaker, he abandoned the stylistic conventions of the tradition and opened up new possibilities for composition with his poem Dàin do Eimhir (Poems to Eimhir, 1943). His work inspired a new generation to take up nua bhàrdachd (the new poetry). These included George Campbell Hay (Deòrsa Mac Iain Dheòrsa, 1915–1984), Lewis-born poets Derick Thomson (Ruaraidh MacThòmais, 1921–2012) and Iain Crichton Smith (Iain Mac a' Ghobhainn, 1928–98). They all focused on the issues of exile, the fate of the Gaelic language and bi-culturalism.

In the 1950s, the review magazine Jabberwock, produced by students at the University of Edinburgh, became a significant vehicle of the Scottish Literary Renaissance.

== Art ==
Stanley Cursiter, Regatta, (1913)

The ideas of a distinctive modern Scottish art were expressed in the inter-war period by figures including Stanley Cursiter (1887–1976), William McCance (1894–1970), William Johnstone (1897–1981) and J. D. Fergusson (1874–1961). Stanley Cursiter was influenced by the Celtic revival, post-impressionism and Futurism, as can be seen in his Rain on Princes Street (1913) and Regatta (1913). He went on to be a major painter of the coastline of his native Orkney, director of the National Gallery of Scotland and proposed the creation of a National Gallery of Modern Art in 1930. Fergusson was one of the few British artists who could claim to have played a part in the creation of modernism and probably played a major part in the formulation of MacDiarmid's thought. His interest in machine imagery can be seen in paintings like Damaged Destroyer (1918). He co-operated with MacDiarmid on the journal Scottish Art and Letters and MacDiarmid quoted extensively from his work.

William McCance's early work was in a bold post-impressionist style. After World War I he moved to London with his wife, fellow student Agnes Miller Parker (1895-1980), where he joined the same circles as Fergusson, vorticist Wyndham Lewis (1882-1957) and nationalist composer Francis George Scott. Under these influences his work became increasingly abstract and influenced by vorticism, as can be seen in Women on an Elevator (1925) and The Engineer and his Wife (1925). William Johnstone (1897–1981) was a cousin of F. G. Scott and met MacDiarmid while a student at Edinburgh. He studied cubism, surrealism and was introduced to new American art by his wife the sculptor Flora Macdonald. He moved towards abstraction, attempting to utilise aspects of landscape, poetry and Celtic art. His most significant work, A Point in Time (1929–38), has been described by art historian Duncan Macmillan as "one of the most important Scottish pictures of the century and one of the most remarkable pictures by any British painter in the period".

Other artists strongly influenced by modernism included James McIntosh Patrick (1907–98) and Edward Baird (1904–49). Both trained in Glasgow, but spent most of their careers in and around their respective native cities of Dundee and Montrose. Both were influenced by surrealism and the work of Bruegel and focused on landscape, as can be seen in McIntosh Patrick's Traquair House (1938) and more overtly Baird's The Birth of Venus (1934). Before his success in painting, McIntosh Patrick gained a reputation as an etcher. Leading figures in the field in the inter-war period included William Wilson (1905–72) and Ian Fleming (1906-94).

== Drama ==
Playwrights associated with the Scottish Renaissance include Robert McLellan, Robert Kemp and Alexander Reid. Much of McLellan's early work was first produced by the Curtain Theatre in Glasgow. His first success came in 1936 with Curtain's production of his comedy, Toom Byres, set at the time of the Border reivers. This was followed in 1937 by Jamie the Saxt, featuring James VI in his prime. This latter production, with Duncan Macrae in the title role, is generally regarded as the one which confirmed McLellan's reputation as a comic dramatist of substance in Scots. The production of another historical Scots comedy, The Bogle, was delayed by the Second World War, eventually being staged as Torwatletie by Glasgow Unity Theatre in 1946. A radio production of his verse play The Carlin Moth was broadcast in the same year. McLellan had written The Flouers o' Edinburgh (1947) in the expectation that it would be produced by the Citizens Theatre in Glasgow but the play was rejected by James Bridie, who was concerned about its overtly nationalist reading of Scottish history. It was given its first production by the Unity Players and a radio production was broadcast in 1951. It was produced by the Gateway Theatre Company in its 1954-55 season, and again in August 1957 as its Edinburgh International Festival production.

Robert Kemp pioneered the translation of existing dramatic works into Scots. His Let Wives Tak Tent, a rendering into Scots of Molière's L'Ecole des femmes, was first produced at the Gateway Theatre in 1948, with Duncan Macrae in the lead role. In the same year, his adaptation of David Lyndsay's Ane Pleasant Satyre of the Thrie Estaitis was staged at the Church of Scotland's Assembly Hall as part of the Edinburgh International Festival. Together with Lennox Milne and Tom Fleming, Kemp founded the Gateway Theatre Company in 1953, taking on the roles of Chairman and resident playwright. The Laird o' Grippy, his adaptation of John Galt's novel The Entail was staged at the Gateway in 1955, with John Laurie in the title role.

While McLellan's most successful plays were set in the distant historic past, Alexander Reid preferred a half-mythic milieu. His two best-known plays are The Lass wi' the Muckle Mou (1950), which drew on the legend of Thomas the Rhymer, and The Warld's Wonder (1953), about the mathematician and reputed magician Michael Scot. The Lass wi' the Muckle Mou was first staged at the Glasgow Citizens Theatre in November 1950. It was adapted as a television drama, first broadcast by the BBC on Tuesday 6 October 1953. The Warld's Wonder was produced at the Gateway in the autumn of 1958.

Victor Carin, who became director of productions at the Gateway in 1963, contributed to the expansion of Scottish theatre's repertoire of works in translation. The Hypochonriack, his translation into Scots of Molière's The Imaginary Invalid, was performed by the Gateway Company during his first season in that role. His second translation, The Servant o' Twa Maisters, translated from Carlo Goldoni's The Servant of Two Masters was the Royal Lyceum Theatre Company's debut production in 1965.

Sydney Goodsir Smith's most successful contribution to the drama of the Scottish Renaissance was The Wallace. Initially broadcast on radio in a BBC production by Finlay J. MacDonald on 30 November 1959, it was first staged at the Kirk's Assembly Hall in a production by Peter Potter as part of the 1960 Edinburgh International Festival. The play was revived by the Scottish Theatre Company in 1985.

== Music and dance ==
The ideas of the Scottish Renaissance were brought to classical music by Francis George Scott (1880–1958), MacDiarmid's former teacher, who set to music several of the poet's works. Lancashire-born Ronald Stevenson (b. 1938) collaborated with Scott and both wrote in twelve-tone technique. Stevenson developed a musical idiom derived from Scottish music, creating settings of folk songs including concertos for his instrument, the piano (1966 and 1972). He also adapted work by Scottish Renaissance poets such as MacDiarmid, Sorley Maclean and William Soutar. The influence of Dmitri Shostakovich (1906–1975) was evident in the initials used in his large-scale piano work Passacaglia on DSCH (1963).

Robin Orr (1909–2006) and Cedric Thorpe Davie (1913–1983) were influenced by modernism and Scottish musical cadences. The influence of modernism can also be heard in the work of Erik Chisholm (1904–1965) in his Pibroch Piano Concerto (1930) and the Straloch suite for Orchestra (1933) and the sonata An Riobhan Dearg (1939). In 1928 he founded the Scottish Ballet Society (later the Celtic Ballet) with choreographer Margaret Morris, the long term partner of J. D. Fergusson. Together they created several ballets, including The Forsaken Mermaid (1940). He was also instrumental in the foundation of the Active Society for the Propagation of Contemporary Music, for which he brought leading composers to Glasgow to perform their work.

== Decline and influence ==
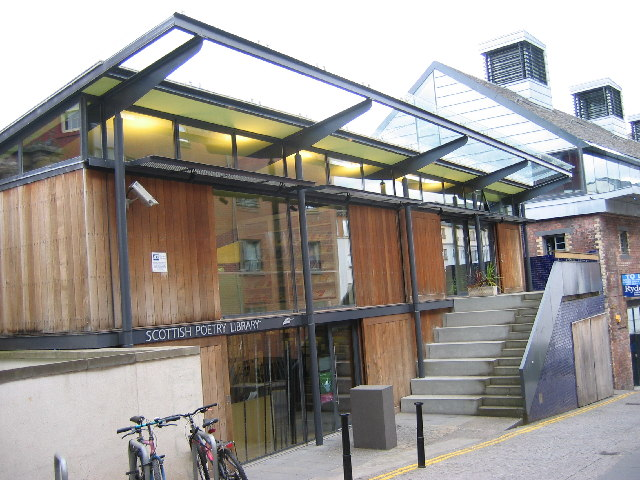
Scottish Poetry Library, Crichton's Close, Edinburgh. The Scottish Renaissance revived interest in Scottish poetry.

Although many of the participants were to live until the 1970s and later, the truly revolutionary aspect of the Scottish Renaissance can be said to have been over by the 1960s, when it became eclipsed by various other movements, often international in nature.

The most famous clash was at the 1962 Edinburgh Writers Festival, where Hugh MacDiarmid denounced Alexander Trocchi, a younger Scottish writer, as "cosmopolitan scum", and Trocchi claimed "sodomy" as a basis for his own writing. This is often seen as a clash of the generations, although it is rarely reported that the two writers corresponded with each other later, and became friends. Both were controversialists of sorts.

The Scottish Renaissance also had a profound effect on the Scottish independence movement, and the roots of the Scottish National Party may be said to be firmly in it.

The revival in both of Scotland's indigenous languages is partly drawn from the renaissance.

== Major figures ==
Other people connected with the Scottish renaissance, not mentioned previously, are listed below.

Note: These figures were not all contemporaries of the first generation of Scottish Renaissance writers and artists who emerged in the 1920s and 1930s. However, most did become involved with the movement in some form through interactions with figures such as Gunn or MacDiarmid, even if at a slightly later date.

- George Bain, who led a revival of Celtic Art
- Alan Bold (MacDiarmid's biographer and critic)
- James Bridie (playwright)
- George Mackay Brown (poet, author and dramatist)
- George Bruce (poet)
- Catherine Carswell (novelist, biographer of Robert Burns and D.H. Lawrence)
- A.J. Cronin (doctor, novelist)
- Helen Cruickshank (poet, who provided a focal point for the social scene)
- Alastair Dunnett (journalist and editor)
- Tom Fleming (actor and theatre director)
- Robert Garioch (poet)
- Isabel Frances Grant (ethnographer)
- George Campbell Hay [Deòrsa Mac Iain Deòrsa] (poet, translator)
- John MacDougall Hay (novelist, journalist, father of George Campbell Hay)
- Robert Hurd (architect)
- Moultrie Kelsall (television producer and actor)
- Jessie Kesson (novelist, playwright)
- Archie Lamont (poet, nationalist pamphleteer)
- William Lamb (sculptor)
- Maurice Lindsay (poet, critic)
- Eric Linklater (novelist and politician)
- Norman MacCaig (poet)
- William McCance (painter)
- Fionn MacColla [Thomas "Tom" Douglas MacDonald] (novelist, historian)
- James Pittendrigh Macgillivray (sculptor)
- Compton MacKenzie (novelist, journalist)
- Agnes Mure Mackenzie (writer and historian)
- Moray MacLaren (writer and broadcasting executive)
- F. Marian McNeill (folklorist)
- Frank Mears (architect and planner)
- Naomi Mitchison (novelist, memoirist, activist)
- Edwin Morgan (poet, not to be confused with Edwin Muir)
- Willa Muir (novelist, translator)
- R. Crombie Saunders (poet, editor, journalist and teacher)
- Nan Shepherd (novelist, nature writer, poet)
- Alexander Scott (poet, playwright and literary critic)
- Tom Scott (poet, translator, critic)
- Ann Scott-Moncrieff (writer and journalist)
- George Scott-Moncrieff (novelist, playwright, poet, journalist)
- Mary Symon (poet)
- David Cleghorn Thomson, (journalist and broadcaster)
- Derick Thomson [Ruaraidh MacThòmais] (poet)
- Wendy Wood (political campaigner, artist and writer)
- Douglas Young (poet, translator, essayist)

People generally considered to be post-renaissance but strongly influenced by it:

- John Cairney (actor)
- George Elder Davie (philosopher)
- Duncan Glen (poet and publisher)
- John Herdman (novelist)
- Brian Holton (translator)
- Tom Hubbard (author)
- Billy Kay (writer)
- Neil MacCallum (political activist and poet)
- Bill McCue (singer)
- John MacInnes (Gaelic scholar)
- William Neill (poet)
- David Purves (playwright and poet)
- Alan Riach (poet and academic)
- James Robertson (novelist and poet)
- Gerda Stevenson (actress, theatre director, writer)

== See also ==
- Robert Burns (limner)
- Gordon Bottomley (poet and playwright)
- Angus Calder (writer and historian)
- Joe Corrie (playwright)
- Bella Caledonia
- Cairns Craig (literary scholar)
- Cencrastus
- David Daiches (literary historian))
- Richard Demarco (artist and cultural impresario)
- John Duncan (symbolist painter)
- Alasdair Gray (writer and artist)
- Murray Grigor (filmmaker, artist, writer)
- Bill Findlay (dramatist and theatre historian)
- Ian Hamilton Finlay (poet, writer, artist and gardener)
- Hamish Henderson (poet, writer and intellectual)
- Fulton Mackay (actor and playwright)
- Charles Nowosielski (theatre director)
- Muriel Spark (novelist, short story writer and essayist)
- Chapman Magazine
- Celtic Revival
- Highland Revival
- Saltire Society
- Scottish Gaelic Renaissance
- Scottish national identity
- Scottish Theatre Company
- Theatre Alba
