= Maurice Lindsay =

Maurice Lindsay may refer to:

- Maurice Lindsay (broadcaster) (1918–2009), Scottish broadcaster, writer and poet
- Maurice Lindsay (rugby league) (1941–2022), rugby league administrators
