= The Martyrdom of St Magnus =

Chamber opera by Peter Maxwell Davies

- Chamber opera by Peter Maxwell Davies
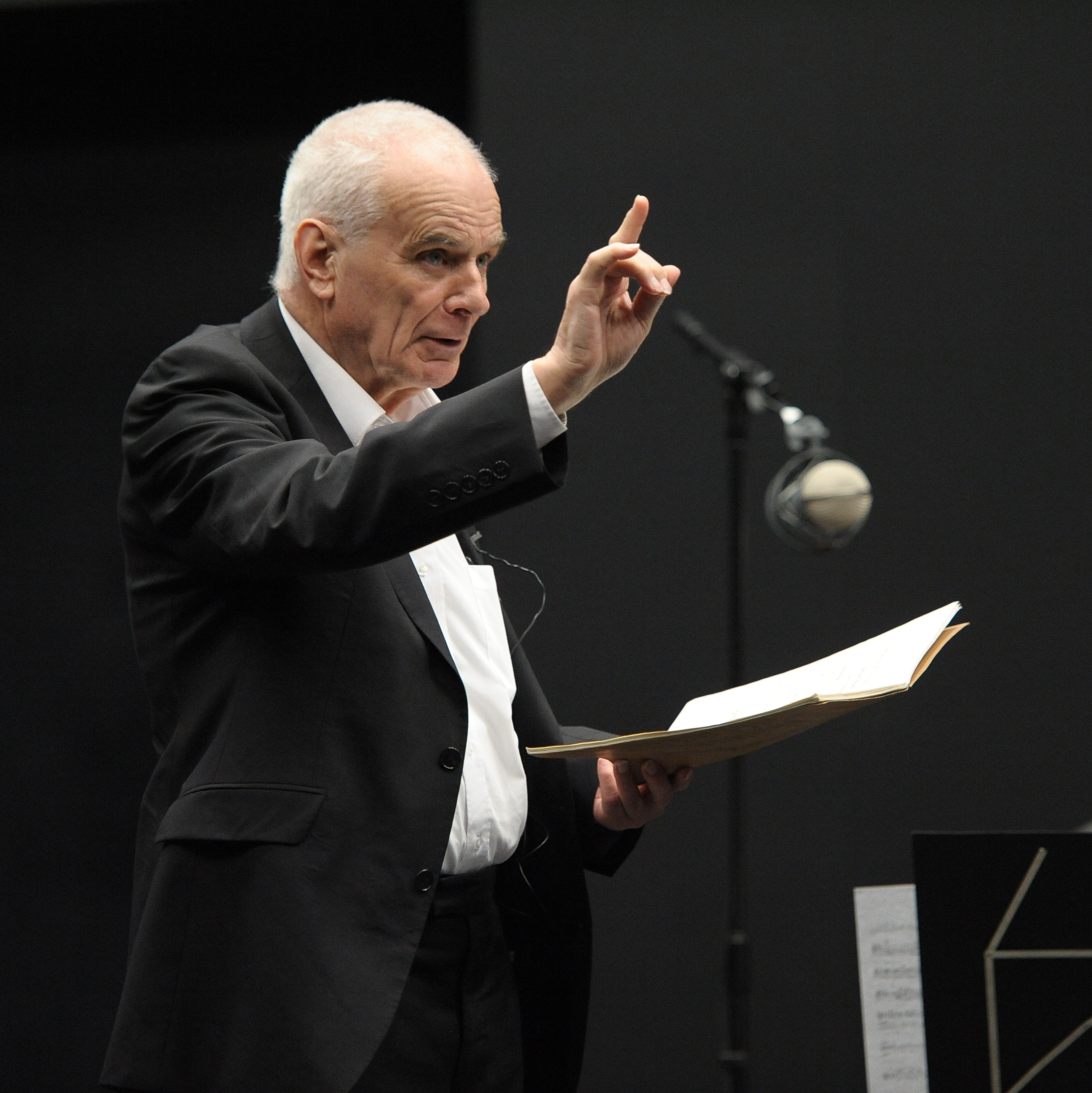
- The composer in 2012
- Librettist: Peter Maxwell Davies
- Based on: George Mackay Brown's novel Magnus
- Premiere: 18 June 1977; St Magnus Cathedral, Kirkwall

The Martyrdom of St Magnus is a chamber opera in one act (with nine scenes) by the British composer Peter Maxwell Davies. The libretto, by Davies himself, is based on the novel Magnus by George Mackay Brown. The opera was first performed in St Magnus Cathedral, Kirkwall, Orkney on 18 June 1977.

== Roles ==
Role	Voice type	Premiere cast, 18 June 1977 Conductor: Peter Maxwell Davies
Earl Magnus/Prisoner	tenor	Neil Mackie
Norse Herald/Litolf/Keeper of the Loom	baritone	Brian Rayner Cook
Welsh Herald/Tempter	baritone	Michael Rippon
Earl Hakon/Officer	bass	Jan Comboy
Blind Mary	mezzo-soprano	Mary Thomas

== Synopsis ==
The opera tells the story of Magnus Erlendsson, Earl of Orkney, who became a Christian saint and martyr. The nine scenes are entitled: 1. The Battle of Menai Strait; 2. The Temptations of Magnus; 3. The Curse of Blind Mary; 4. The Peace Parley; 5.Magnus's Journey to the Isle of Egilsay; 6.Earl Hakon plots to murder Magnus; 7. The Reporters; 8. The Sacrifice; 9. The Miracle.
