= Hamnavoe =

Hamnavoe may refer to:

- The town of Stromness in Orkney, formerly known as Hamnavoe
- Several towns, villages or hamlets in the Shetland Islands:
  - Hamnavoe, West Burra, in West Burra
  - Hamnavoe, Eshaness, in Eshaness
  - Hamnavoe, Papa Stour, in Papa Stour
  - Hamnavoe, Lunna Ness, in Lunna Ness
  - Hamnavoe, Yell, in Yell
- Hamnavoe Bay
- The ferry MV Hamnavoe
- Hamnavoe (poem), a poem by George Mackay Brown
