= Stella Cartwright =

- Born: 1938; Edinburgh, Scotland
- Died: 1985; Edinburgh, Scotland

Stella Cartwright was a Scottish muse and lover to a number of Scottish poets. During her lifetime she was sometimes known as 'The Muse of Rose Street' and was often seen as part of a group meeting in Milnes Bar in Edinburgh. She was the daughter of a local architect, her father was a friend of Norman McCaig and through this connection she was introduced to other poets and writers. She features in Maggie Fergusson's biography of George Mackay Brown and Stanley Roger Green's 'A Clamjafray of Poets: Tale of Literary Edinburgh 1950-1985' is both dedicated to her, and includes a full chapter on her. In his foreword to the book, Paul Henderson Scott suggests that "at least four of the six poets were in love with her, but she seems to have been an inspiration to them all". Her own work is little known and any poetry she produced is unpublished. Some of her artworks were sold in Edinburgh.

Her best known relationship was with George Mackay Brown, to whom she was engaged, and she was described as 'The love of his life.' His correspondence to her is well-documented in archives of his life and work. Her relationship with Mackay Brown has also been reimagined in fiction in the novel Hame by Annalena McAfee. She is romantically linked also to Tom Scott and Sydney Goodsir Smith.

She inspired Scott's poem of midlife crisis and religious loss, 'The Paschal Candil'. Letters from Goodsir Smith to Stella can be found in archives along with poems 'Seal Sang’ and ‘Christmas Carol 1966’ addressed to her. George Mackay Brown wrote Stella a birthday poem every year for the rest of her life.

Cartwright struggled with alcoholism throughout her adult life and died prematurely in 1985 at the age of 47.
