= John Malcolm Bulloch =

Scottish journalist and editor

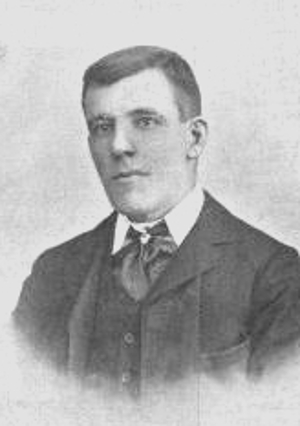
John Malcolm Bulloch, 1895 photograph

John Malcolm Bulloch (1867–1938) was a Scottish journalist and magazine editor. He also worked as a genealogist, a literary critic, and a theatre critic. He is best known for his prolific authorship of works on Scottish regiments and clans, particularly on Clan Gordon and Gordonology.

== Early life ==
He was born at Old Machar, Aberdeen 26 May 1867, the elder son of John Bulloch (1837–1913) and his wife Mary Malcolm (1835–1899); William Bulloch was his younger brother. His father edited Scottish Notes and Queries, and wrote a biography of George Jamesone.

After attending the grammar schools of New Aberdeen and Old Aberdeen, Bulloch became a student at King's College, Aberdeen. He graduated M.A. in 1888; and began his career as a journalist on the Aberdeen Free Press at the age of 22, making an early reputation for vers de société and antiquarian research.

Moving to London in 1893, Bulloch had a send-off in the form of a smoking concert at Mann's Hotel. He took on an editorial position at The Sketch. During his early days in London he lodged with a group of Scots in 19 Calthorpe Street in Clerkenwell, including his brother William; Arthur Keith, a friend of the family in medicine; the brothers' maternal uncle "Malcy", an architect; and two journalists, William Andrew MacKenzie (1870–1942), recommended in 1895 as a poet by John Davidson to John Lane, and J. G. George.

By September 1895, Bulloch had moved to Pall Mall, London. In the early years of the 20th century, he married an English wife.

== Career ==
=== Editor in illustrated journalism ===
Bulloch first became an assistant editor of The Sphere under Clement Shorter. The "new illustrated journalism" of the 1890s was defined by Bulloch as "the art of treating pictorially every aspect of the passing pageant of life that can be illustrated at all", attributing it to Shorter; who at least concurred with Bulloch. William Ingram, a proponent of Melton Prior and Frederic Villiers, made public criticism of Shorter's choice of artists in 1899. By this point halftone photographs were coming to outnumber engravings in illustrated papers.

From 1909 to 1924 Bulloch edited The Graphic. It had established a pictorial style in the late 1860s, with Luke Fildes as staff artist. Bulloch succeeded Comyns Beaumont, who called him "a stumpy, gnarled, thick-set son of Caledonia", a "crusted Tory", and "one of the least-fitted men" to edit it.

=== Scots language ===
Bulloch became noted in London for his "unquenchable" Doric dialect. He did not approve of what he called "Albyn Place English" taught in some Aberdeen schools. He championed the Scots language poetry of Mary Symon and Jean Baxter.

The Vernacular Circle, of the Burns Club of London, was set up in 1920 for discussions of the future of the Scots language (known variously, e.g. as Lallans or Braid Scots). Bulloch became president, with William Will, another Scottish journalist, as Secretary. It involved Bulloch in controversy with the poet Christopher Grieve (Hugh MacDiarmid). The latter's views on Scots were close to those of Lewis Spence, and he had taken to heart the strictures and mockery of George Gregory Smith on dialect Scots, who had written in 1919 of "the surprising travesty called 'Braid Scots'".

Grieve took aim at "the pedantic patriots of London". He objected to literary use of Doric: writing that for the most part "the Doric tradition serves to condone mental inertia — cloaking mental paucity with a trivial and ridiculously over-valued pawkiness". He hit out, after Bulloch lectured to the Vernacular Circle on Doric and diminutives: "Dr. Bulloch's plea for Doric infantilism is not worthy of the critical consideration of nursery governesses". He objected to Bulloch's praise of Mary Symon, and overall to what he saw as misrepresentation of Robert Burns and his poetry. He did see a function for the Doric: rounding out flat kailyard school characters with "Scottish psychology" drawn from "unconscious" traces in Doric literature. Grieve's Vernacular Circle lecture, "Unexpressed Elements in Scottish Life", was excluded from The Scottish Tongue (1924), the published form of the lecture series.

=== Critic ===
In 1924, Bulloch became a literary critic for Allied Newspapers Ltd. He wrote between 500 and 600 book reviews annually. He had long had a reputation as "first-nighter", having by 1917 "seen 1,746 plays of more than one act, the programmes of which he keeps bound and indexed." He became known as a theatre critic.

== Works ==
Bulloch was a prolific author of works on Scottish regiments and clans, concentrating on Clan Gordon. The Oxford Companion to Scottish History mentions Bulloch's contribution to the understanding of relations between Scotland and central Europe.

In 1921 Bulloch was a founder member of the Society for Army Historical Research, and was active on their Council and Publications Committee, as well as writing articles for their Journal. He was one of a group of experts on Scottish military history and dress, that included also William Skeoch Cumming and Iain Hamilton MacKay Scobie.

=== Gordonology ===
As for the one-name study on Gordon (surname), Bulloch commented on it in 1909 in the terms that "all the best work in Gordonology is done by people who are only half Scots, or by Scots who have left their native hearth". In The Gordons in Forfarshire from the same year, he mentioned the research of David Stewart Ramsay Gordon (1845–1905), a merchant in Chile, known for his transcription of parish registers; and Charles James Gordon (1853–1944) from Ringford, rector of Great Salkeld. An annual report of 1911 by the New Spalding Club noted the appearance, since the previous report, of 117 newspaper articles by Bulloch, in 13 newspapers, dealing with Gordon family branches.

- Gordon Book; published for the Bazaar of the Fochabers Reading Room, Sept. 1902 (1902)
- The House of Gordon, vol. I (1903). Vol. II appeared in 1907; and vol. III in 1912. Bulloch was general editor of these volumes, the third of which, Gordons under Arms, was compiled by Constance Oliver Skelton. She was brought in to work on military Gordons by Peter John Anderson.
- The Name of Gordon: patronymics which it has replaced or reinforced (1906)
- The families of Gordon of Invergordon, Newhall, also Ardoch, Ross-shire, and Carroll, Sutherland (1906)
- The family of Gordon in Griamachary, in the parish of Kildonan (1907)
- The Gordons in Sutherland, including the Embo family (1907)
- The gay Gordons: some strange adventures of a famous Scots family (1908)
- The Gordons in Forfarshire with the lairds of Ashludie, Donavourd, Tarvie, Threave, and Charleton (1909)
- Gordons of Salterhill and their Irish descendants (1910)
- The Gordons and Smiths at Minmore, Auchorachan, and Upper Drumin in Glenlivet (1910)
- Gordons of Cairnfield : and their hold on the lands of Echres, Auchinhalrig, Arneidlie, Cufurrach, Mayne, Myrieton, Coynach, Whitburn, Lunan, Briggs, Arradoul and Rosieburn (1910)
- The Gordons of Cluny: from the early years of the eighteenth century down to the present time (1911)
- The strange adventures of the Reverend James Gordon, sensualist, spy, strategist (?), and soothsayer (1911)
- The Gordons of Coldwells, Ellon: Now Represented by the Family of Von Gordon of Laskowitz, West Prussia (1914)
- The Making of the West Indies. The Gordons as colonists (1915)
- Thomas Gordon, the "Independent Whig" (1918)
- Bibliography of the Gordons (1924)
- The Caterans of Inveraven (1927)
- The gay adventures of Sir Alexander Gordon, Knight of Navidale (1925)
- The Gordons in Poland: "Marquises of Huntly" with a Line in Saxony (1932)

=== Other books ===
- The Lord Rectors of the Universities of Aberdeen (1890)
- University Centenary Ceremonies (1893)
- A History of the University of Aberdeen: 1495–1895 (1895)
- The Rectorship: In Scotch Universities (1902)
- The Art of Extra-illustration (1903). Bulloch had made a collection of portraits of Boer War officers, now in the British Library.
- Territorial soldiering in the north-east of Scotland during 1759–1814 (1914)
- Class Records in Aberdeen & in America (1916), with a bibliography of Aberdeen class records by P .J. Anderson
- The Scottish Tongue: A Series of Lectures on the Vernacular Language of Lowland Scotland (1924), contributor with John Buchan, William Craigie and Peter Giles. The lectures were delivered in 1921 to the Vernacular Circle of the Burns Club of London, Bulloch speaking on "The delight of the Doric in the diminutive". The introduction by William Will of the Burns Club explained that the lecture of Christopher Grieve (Hugh MacDiarmid) had not been included.
- A Centennial Bibliography of George Macdonald (1925). On George MacDonald (1824–1905). It was reprinted in the 1984 bibliography by Mary Nance Jordan.
- The Centenary of James Morison the "Hygeist" (1935), on James Morison
- The Bairds of Auchmedden and Strichen, Aberdeenshire (1934)
- The last Baird Laird of Auchmedden and Strichen. The case of Mr. Abington (1934). On George Alexander Baird.

C.K.S.: An Autobiography; a Fragment by Himself (1927) was by Clement Shorter, who died in 1926. Bulloch was the editor.

== Death and legacy ==
Bulloch died at Seaford, East Sussex on 6 March 1938. A service for him was held at St Bride's Church, Fleet Street. A memorial was placed in the Library of King's College, Aberdeen.

After his death, Bulloch's collection of Gordoniana (see -ana) was donated to the University of Aberdeen. It was used by Edward Gordon of Cairnfield in compiling his Book of the Gordons (manuscript). His collection of performing arts ephemera, in 57 volumes, is now in the British Library, which also has 37 volumes of genealogical material and details of Boer War soldiers.
