= Francis George Scott =

Scottish composer (1880–1958)

Francis George Scott (25 January 1880 – 6 November 1958) was a Scottish composer often associated with the Scottish Renaissance.

Born at 6 Oliver Crescent, Hawick, Roxburghshire, he was the son of a supplier of mill-engineering parts. Educated at Hawick, and at the universities of Edinburgh and Durham, he studied composition under Jean Roger-Ducasse in Paris. From 1904 to 1913 he was a teacher at Langholm Academy, where he taught the young Christopher Murray Grieve. In 1925, he became lecturer in music at Jordanhill Training College for Teachers, Glasgow, a post he held for more than twenty-five years. He received the honorary degree of LL.D. from the University of Glasgow in 1957.

Scott's approach to composition was informed by an intense love of Scottish literature, which won him the Saintsbury essay prize at the University of Edinburgh. He wrote more than three hundred songs, including many settings of Hugh MacDiarmid, William Dunbar, William Soutar and Robert Burns's poems. MacDiarmid stated in an essay that his key long poem A Drunk Man Looks at the Thistle could not have been completed without Scott's help. In another essay, he expressed regret that he and Scott had not been able to do more work together on the corpus of Scottish popular song. Scott published six volumes of Scottish lyrics. In 1949, a complete performance of his Thirty-five Scottish and Other Poems was given in Edinburgh and Glasgow. On 24 January 1980, a concert was held in the Queen's Hall, Edinburgh to mark the centenary of his birth.

The Anglo-Scottish composer Ronald Stevenson has transcribed several of Scott's works for piano, including the Eight Songs of Francis George Scott. Toccata issued a CD of the complete music for solo piano in 2021 including the first recording of Intuitions, a set of 57 miniatures, performed by Christopher Guild. A selection of the songs has been recorded on the CD Moonstruck, performed by Lisa Milne, Roderick Williams and Iain Burnside.

Scott's daughter, Lillias, married the Scottish composer Erik Chisholm.

== Sources ==
Sadie, S. (ed.) (1980) The New Grove Dictionary of Music & Musicians, [vol. # 17].
