= William McCance =

Scottish artist (1894–1970)

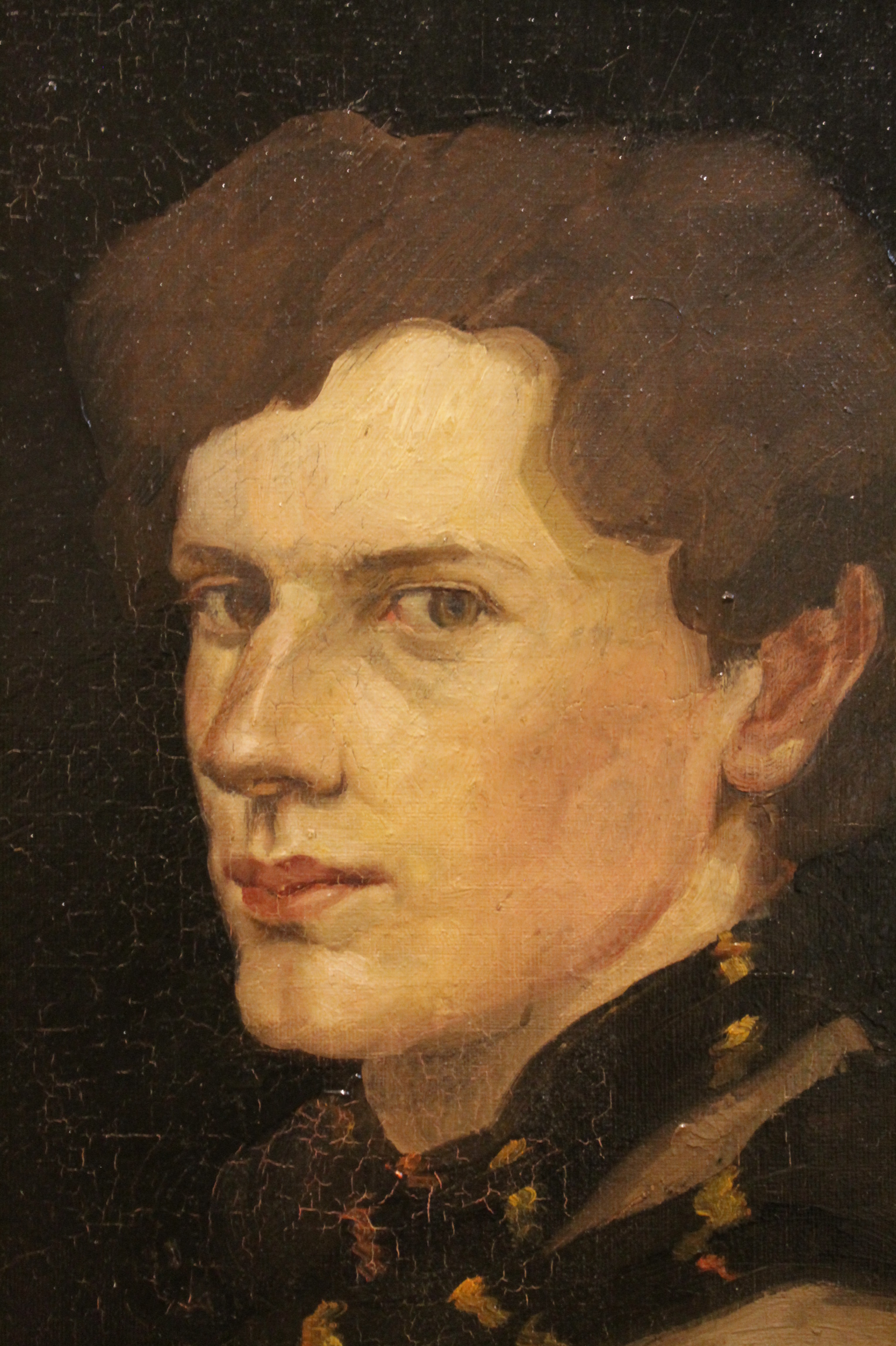
William McCance (self-portrait 1916)

William McCance (1894–1970) was a Scottish artist, and was second Controller of the Gregynog Press in Powys, mid-Wales.

== Biography ==
Born on 6 August 1894 in Cambuslang, Scotland, William McCance was the seventh of eight children. After attending Hamilton Academy, McCance entered Glasgow School of Art, studying there 1911–15 and subsequently undertaking a teacher-training course at Glasgow's Kennedy Street school.

A conscientious objector in World War I, McCance was imprisoned.

After discharge from prison in 1919, McCance and his illustrator/engraver wife, Agnes Miller Parker (1895–1980, married 1918), moved to London, where McCance was employed as a teacher and art critic, writing for The Spectator, the News Chronicle and Picture Post. McCance's paintings in the 1920s were unusual in that he was one of the few Scottish artists who embraced the cubist, abstract and machine-inspired arts movements that spread across Europe following the First World War. He was a friend of Hugh MacDiarmid and one of the artists associated with the Scottish Renaissance movement.

In the 1930s McCance took the post of second Controller of the famous Gregynog Press, Wales, founded in 1922. In 1943 he succeeded Robert Gibbings as lecturer in typography and book design at the University of Reading. On his retirement, a comprehensive exhibition of his work was mounted at the Reading Museum and Art Gallery. William McCance died in Ayrshire on 19 November 1970, aged 76.

A collection of his paintings is held in the National Galleries of Scotland and Dundee Art Gallery, and in 1975 a retrospective exhibition of his work was shown at Dundee, Glasgow and Edinburgh.
