= Gunnie Moberg =

Swedish photographer and artist

Photo by Alistair Peebles

Gun Margoth Moberg (8 May 1941 – 31 October 2007) was a Swedish photographer and artist who worked in Scotland. Her work includes photographs featuring the Orkney, Shetland, and Faroe Islands.

== Biography ==
Gunnie Moberg was born on 8 May 1941 in Gothenburg, Sweden. Her father Åke Moberg was an accountant, and her mother Margot Lundblad was an amateur painter. Gunnie left school at the age of 16 in order to pursue artistic photography.

She began by working at a photographer's studio in Gothenburg but moved to Edinburgh, Scotland a year later. In Edinburgh she worked as an au pair and studied pottery at the Edinburgh College of Art, where she met Californian artist Tam MacPhail. They married in January 1961 and had four sons. They initially settled in Argyll, but later moved to Orkney in 1976, after Gunnie Moberg's visit in 1975.

Her husband ran a bookshop in Stromness called 'Stromness Books & Prints', which published her first photography book in 1979. Between 1977 and 1979, the St Magnus Festival and the Pier Arts Centre were established. The St Magnus Festival appointed her photographer in residence; a role that she held for nearly thirty years.

Her popularity as a photographer grew over time, but in later years she turned to painting. She died at the age of 66 in Stromness.

== Artistic work ==
Morberg's first publication was Stone Built in 1979. In this book, the photographer collected 18 aerial pictures she took across Orkney. She subsequently published a number of photography books. Her main subjects were the landscapes of the North Atlantic.

In 1986 Moberg started a collaboration with the poet George Mackay Brown. Together, they published five books in which Moberg's photographs interweaved with George Mackay Brown's poetry. She also collaborated with the Norwegian author Liv Kjørsvik Schei. This collaboration gave birth to The Orkney Story (1985) and The Shetland Story (1988).

== Publications ==
- 1979: Stone Built. Stormness Books & Prints
- 1985: The Orkney Story. Batsford Grøndahl.
- 1986: The Loom of Light. Balnain Books
- 1987: Stone. Kulgin Duval & Colin Hamilton.
- 1987: A Celebration for Magnus. Balnain Books.
- 1988: A Portrait of Orkney. John Murray.
- 1990: A Bit of Crack and Car Culture. Balnain Books.
- 1991: The Faroe Islands. John Murray.
- 1991: The Shetland Story. Batsford.
- 1996: Orkney Pictures & Poems. Colin Baxter.
- 1998: Orcades. Editions Apogée
- 2000: The Island of Orkney. Colin Baxter.
- 2002: St Magnus Festival. A Celebration. Orcadian.
- 2006: Orkney. Birlinn.
- 2006: The Shetland Islands. Colin Baxter.
