= Vinland (novel) =

1992 novel by George Mackay Brown

- First edition
- Author: George Mackay Brown
- Language: English
- Genre: Novel
- Publisher: John Murray (UK)
- Publication date: 1992
- Publication place: Great Britain
- Media type: Print (hardback and paperback)
- Pages: 260 pp (paperback edition)
- ISBN: 978-1-904598-33-6 (paperback edition)
- OCLC: 57640119

Vinland, published in 1992 by George Mackay Brown, is a historical novel set in the Orkney Islands in the early 11th century. It derives its name from a voyage the protagonist takes to that faraway land in the west.

== Plot summary ==
The novel's protagonist is Ranald Sigmundson, an Orkneyman who journeys to Vinland as a youth, fights in the battle of Clontarf, and has other adventures. Later in life, Ranald tends his farm and warns his family and friends against becoming too involved in worldly affairs.

Ranald, an only child living in Stromness, Orkney, is nearly twelve and about to start working on his mother's father's farm, when his father, a skipper prone to violent fits, takes him with him on a journey to Iceland and then Greenland. In Reykjavik, Ranald meets Leif Erikson, who tells him he's going to sail as far west as he can. When Ranald returns to this father's ship, his father beats him for having wandered off; the next day, Erikson's crew discovers the boy as a stowaway on their ship. His father's ship is destroyed in a storm, and Erikson reaches Vinland. Ranald exchanges glances and a greeting with a young boy there, but (prompted by beer drinking) a fight breaks out, and Erikson's settlement is under constant threat; after a few months and the death of some crew members, Erikson decides to leave. The image of the "skræling", who were able to live in balance with nature and whose enmity was caused only by the violence of one of the crew, stays with Ranald.

== Religiosity and autobiography ==
Continuing themes that had come to the fore in his An Orkney Tapestry (1969), Vinland displays plenty of "martial and devout Norse heroism". The Tapestry was written eight years after Brown converted to Catholicism, and the "gentle pre-Reformation Catholicism" that is an important strand in the Tapestry is seen clearly in Vinland.

Written at a time when Brown's health was wavering, Vinland is a rare autobiographical insight into the author's thoughts about death. Like Ranald Sigmundsson, Brown converted to a Christian mentality. In the novel, Ranald yearns for a final voyage back to Vinland. However, the voyage is metaphorical: he dies on Easter Monday, and therefore his voyage is a spiritual rather than a physical one. What Vinland represents is echoed throughout Brown's work in his search for 'silence', that is, a sense for Christian peace, unity, meaning and order. He uses the Vikings' belief in fate (wyrd) as a backdrop to his message for Christian order. Ranald starts to despise the Viking way of life, and he soon turns very introspective and isolated, contemplating the meaning of life along emerging Christian principles. In short, his final voyage to the 'west' is a voyage to heaven, to an Eden – a harmonious world that was lost when the mythological representative of the apocalyptical hound Fenrir, Wolf, swings his axe and kills a Native American, destroying any hope of reconciliation.
