= Scottish Gaelic Renaissance =

The Scottish Gaelic Renaissance (Scottish Gaelic: Ath-Bheòthachadh na Gàidhlig) is a continuing movement concerning the revival of the Scottish Gaelic language and its literature. Although the Scottish Gaelic language had been facing gradual decline in the number of speakers since the late 19th century, due to the increasing use of Scottish Gaelic-medium education the number of young and fluent Gaelic speakers is quickly rising. A similar trend using similar tactics is also taking place in the language revival of Canadian Gaelic in Nova Scotia, New Brunswick, and Prince Edward Island.

The movement has its origins in the Scottish Renaissance and especially in the work of Sorley MacLean, George Campbell Hay, Derick Thomson and Iain Crichton Smith. A major role has also been played by the literary scholarship of John Lorne Campbell, Ronald Black, Donald E. Meek, and many others like them.

Sabhal Mòr Ostaig is sometimes seen as being a product of this renaissance. Although many of the products of the Renaissance were in poetry, fiction, or in Scottish traditional music, many such as MacLean and Iain Crichton Smith, and more recently Aonghas MacNeacail, Angus Peter Campbell, and Christopher Whyte have blended Gaelic folklore, mythology, and literary traditions with more international literary styles such as magic realism.

== Politics ==
Mike Russell became the first person to address a European Union meeting in Scottish Gaelic in May 2010. Gaelic had long suffered from its lack of use in educational and administrative contexts, having been suppressed in the past but it has now achieved some official recognition with the passage of the Gaelic Language (Scotland) Act 2005.

At the first Scottish Parliament, a number of people also swore their oaths in English and Scottish Gaelic. (A version of the oath had to be said in English.)

== Literature ==
- Aonghas Pàdraig Caimbeul - author
- Somhairle MacGill-Eain - poet
- Iain Mac a' Ghobhainn - intellectual, poet and author.
- Ruaraidh MacThòmais - academic, author, poet and publisher.

== Books ==
- Sharon Macdonald, Reimagining Culture: Histories, Identities and the Gaelic Renaissance (Oxford, Berg, 1997).
- Roger Hutchinson, A Waxing Moon: The Modern Gaelic Revival (Edinburgh, Mainstream Publishing, 2005).

== See also ==
- Celtic Revival
- Gaelic revival (Irish)
- Highland Revival
- Scottish Renaissance
