= Magnus (novel) =

1973 novel by George Mackay Brown

First edition (publ. The Bodley Head)

Magnus is a novel by the Orcadian author George Mackay Brown. His second novel, it was published in 1973. it is a fictional account of the life and execution of the 12th-century saint, Magnus Erlendsson, Earl of Orkney.

== Plot introduction ==
Easily Mackay Brown's most religious novel—written after he was received into the Roman Catholic Church—it is seen principally from the perspective of outsiders (peasants, mercenaries, schoolfriends, tinkers) which Mackay Brown interleaves with the Christian tradition of the seamless robe of Jesus.

The narrative implies that Magnus's life is a preordained quest for the garment as a manifested object. It moves swiftly from Magnus's conception to his boyhood at the monastery on Birsay, his non-violent participation at the Battle of Menai Strait (depicted in the Orkneyinga Saga) to the political manoeuvring and outright conflict between Magnus and his cousin Earl Hakon Paulsson.

The narrative also reflects on the damage this inflicted on the inhabitants of the islands. At the pivotal moment of Magnus's execution by Hakon, the narrative switches to Flossenbürg concentration camp during World War II . Magnus's unwitting executioner Litolf becomes a cook at the camp, co-opted into the hanging of the theologian Dietrich Bonhoeffer by the camp's drunk Nazi commanding officers.

The story returns to 12th-century Orkney, and concludes with the tinkers, Jock and Mary (present since the outset of the tale). Jock prays to the tomb of the (as yet uncanonised) 'Saint' Magnus, but is reprimanded by Brother Colomb, Magnus's former teacher. However, not long after, Mary, hitherto blinded by cataracts, suddenly has her sight restored.

Throughout the novel, Mackay Brown contrasts the inevitable nature of Magnus's fate with the symbolic significance of pre-Christian ritual, including human sacrifice. Despite this, critics have noted the deeply meditative nature of the work despite the bloody events it depicts and the harshness of existence in 12th-century Orkney.

== The Martyrdom of St Magnus ==
In 1977 the English composer Peter Maxwell Davies adapted Mackay Brown's story into a one-act opera. Davies begins the story at the Battle of Menai Strait, and retains the flash forward to the 20th century for Magnus's execution. In this version the location and person of the victim is unnamed.

It was commissioned by the BBC for the Silver Jubilee of Queen Elizabeth II. It was first performed in Kirkwall at the first St Magnus Festival, with Neil Mackie as Magnus and the Fires of London conducted by Peter Maxwell Davies. The production was directed by Murray Melvin. Davies later recorded the opera (with different forces) for Unicorn-Kanchana records.
