= R. Crombie Saunders =

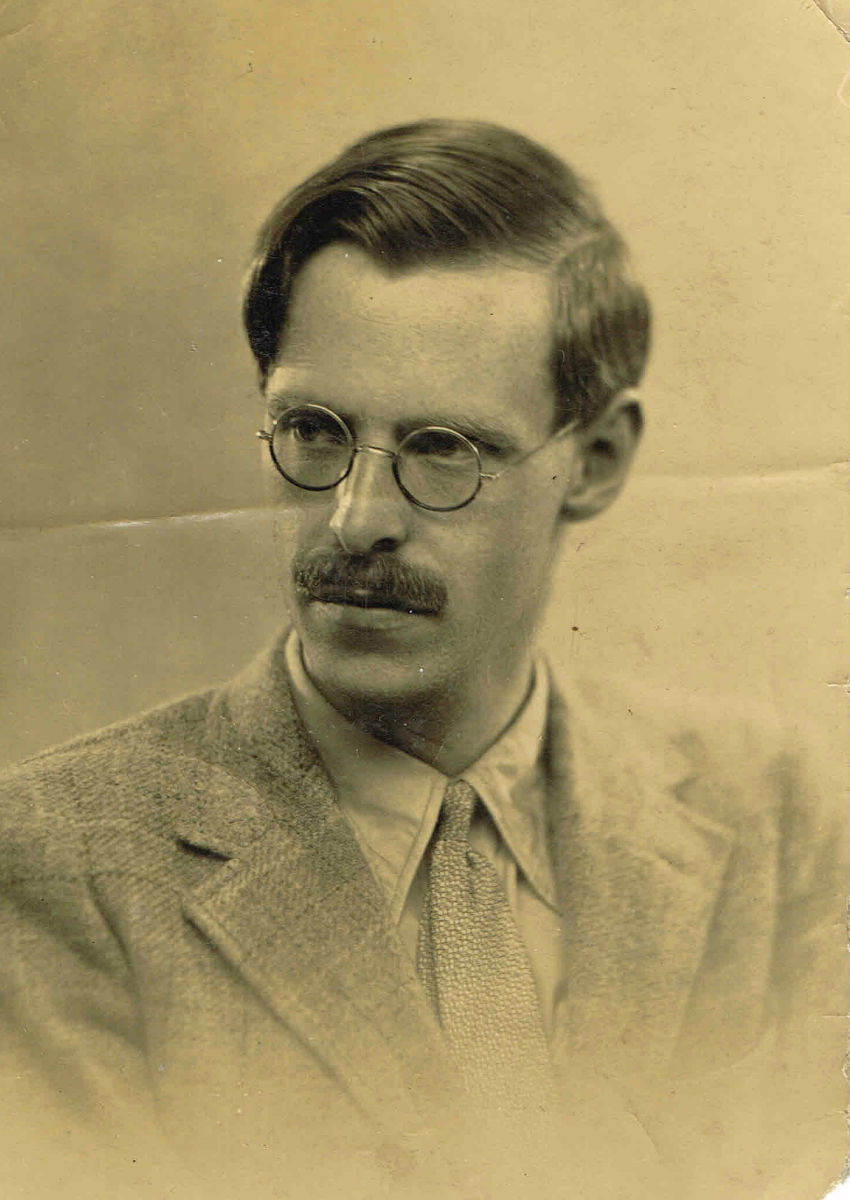
R. Crombie Saunders

Robert Crombie Saunders (23 April 1914 – 14 February 1991) was a poet, editor, journalist and teacher, and a significant figure in the Scottish Renaissance of the 20th century. His poetry is in both English and Scots, and he identified with the 'Lallans' movement, which sought to revive Scots as a serious literary medium.

== Biographical ==
Born in Glasgow, R. Crombie Saunders was educated at Hillhead High School and Glasgow University, graduating MA in 1937. From 1938-39 he was an Assistant Editor with Blackie & Son. Ruled unfit for military service on health grounds, he was employed during the war as private secretary to David Archer, publisher (1941–42) and as an Employment Officer in the Ministry of Labour and National Service (1942–43). He edited Scottish Art and Letters (with J. D. Fergusson as Art Editor) from 1944–48, a total of four issues, with the fifth issue being edited by Hugh MacDiarmid (C.M. Grieve). In 1944 he edited the Selected Poems of Hugh MacDiarmid. He was associate and literary editor of the left-wing paper Forward from 1947-59. From 1948-53 he edited The Scottish Angler, and was Angling Correspondent for the Daily Herald from 1954-57. He was also editor of Scots Independent from 1953-54. From 1958 he was a short story assessor and children's books reviewer for the BBC.

In 1952, he moved to a small cottage in the Perthshire Highlands. With a growing family to support, he retrained as a teacher, and taught first at Balquhidder Primary, then Killin Junior Secondary before moving to Callander, where he was part of the English department at McLaren High until his retirement. His last years were spent in Killin, Perthshire.

== Literary connections ==
Saunders was friends with many of the major players in the Scottish Renaissance, including Sydney Goodsir Smith, Sorley McLean, Douglas Young, Alexander Scott, C. M. Grieve (Hugh MacDiarmid) and in particular Norman MacCaig, whom he introduced to MacDiarmid. He and MacCaig shared an interest in angling as well as poetry, and MacCaig accompanied his researches for A Guide to the Fishing Inns of Scotland (1950). However, chronic ill health and geographical isolation meant that Saunders was never a regular with the 'Rose Street poets,' and his friendships went beyond that circle to include writers such as Moray McLaren. Ian Hamilton Finlay was another close friend, and wrote his obituary in the Glasgow Herald. Towards the end of his life, he renewed his acquaintance with the poet W.S. Graham, and they exchanged regular correspondence and audiotapes of their work.

== Poetry ==
R. Crombie Saunders' work can be found in many contemporary poetry journals and in anthologies of modern Scottish verse. His first poetry collection was The Year's Green Edge in 1955. This was followed by XXI Poems containing most of his poems in Scots. After a long silence, he published This One Tree in 1986, containing most of his poetry since the fifties as well as some earlier uncollected pieces.

The Collected Poems, edited by his son Donald G. Saunders, was published in 2022.

Whether in Scots or English, the poetry is characterised by a respect for, and sensitivity too, form and rhythm; this applies to his later 'free verse' as much as to his earlier metrical work. Recurrent themes are the lyrical concerns of love and loss, time and memory. Some, like Above the Formidable Tomb and Had I Twa Herts, are profoundly metaphysical. He also wrote a poem in Middle Scots (Ressaif My Saul), and gently satirised some of his contemporaries in Doun the Watter wi the Lave. His most anthologised piece has been The Empty Glen, a poem about the Highland Clearances which he came to look on as his 'Daffodils.'

== Publications ==
- (Ed.) Selected Poems of Hugh MacDiarmid (William McLellan, 1944)
- A Guide to the Fishing Inns of Scotland (Kaye, 1951)
- The Year's Green Edge (Contemporary Poetry XV, 1955)
- XXI Poems (M. Macdonald, Edinburgh, 1955),
- This One Tree (privately published, 1986)
- Collected Poems (edited by Donald G Saunders and with a critical introduction by Ian Spring) (Rymour Books, 2022)

=== Anthologies ===
Modern Scottish Poetry (ed. Maurice Lindsay); Scottish Verse 1851-1951 (ed. Douglas Young, 1952); Honour'd Shade (ed. Norman McCaig, 1959); The Oxford Book of Scottish Verse (ed. John MacQueen and Tom Scott, 1966); Poems Addressed to Hugh MacDiarmid and Presented to Him on His Seventy-Fifth birthday (ed. Duncan Glen, 1967); Contemporary Scottish Verse (ed. Norman MacCaig and Alexander Scott, 1970); The New Makars (ed. Tom Hubbard, 1991); The Edinburgh Book of 20th Century Scottish Poets (Ed. Maurice Lindsay and Lesley Duncan, 2005).
