= Beside the Ocean of Time =

1994 novel by George Mackay Brown

- First edition
- Author: George Mackay Brown
- Language: English
- Genre: Novel
- Publisher: John Murray
- Publication date: 1994
- Publication place: Scotland
- Pages: 217
- ISBN: 1-896209-12-2
- OCLC: 31767769

Beside the Ocean of Time (1994) is a novel by Scottish writer George Mackay Brown. It was shortlisted for the Booker Prize and judged Scottish Book of the Year by the Saltire Society. The plot follows Thorfinn Ragnarson from the imaginary island of Norday in Orkney in the 1930s. The son of a tenant farmer, he regularly daydreams about historical fantasies. After foreseeing his own future, he begins to see a correlation between history, daydreaming and fate.
