= Joseph Macleod =

British poet & actor (1903–1984)

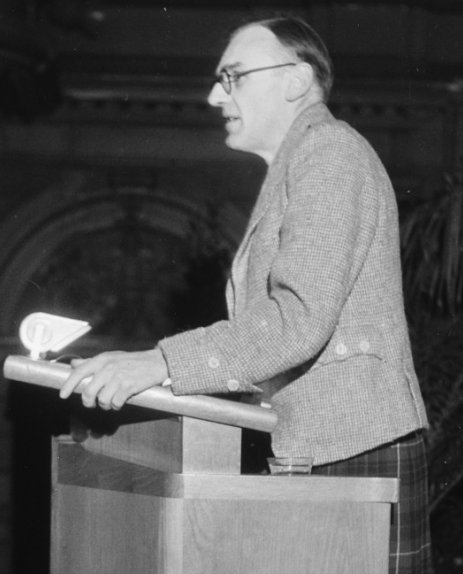
Joseph Macleod in 1946

Joseph Todd Gordon Macleod (1903–1984) was a British poet, actor, playwright, theatre director, theatre historian and BBC newsreader. He also published poetry under the pseudonym Adam Drinan.

== Biography ==
Macleod was the son of Scottish parents, and was educated at Rugby School and Balliol College, Oxford. He passed his bar examinations, though never practised as a barrister, preferring a career as an actor, and also had aspirations as a poet. At Rugby he was a close friend of Adrian Stokes, and at Oxford he became a close friend of Graham Greene.

From 1927, he was an actor and producer at the experimental Cambridge Festival Theatre. In 1933 he became the theatre's director and lessee. Five of his own plays were staged there, including Overture to Cambridge (1933) and A Woman Turned to Stone (1934). Under Macleod, the theatre became famous throughout Europe for its avant-garde productions, and staging of lesser known works by great playwrights. Macleod staged some of Ezra Pound's Noh plays, and also some Ibsen and Chekhov (his company, The Cambridge Festival Players, was one of the first in the UK to stage Chekhov's play The Seagull). The theatre was forced to close due to financial difficulties in June 1935, and has remained so ever since. He was intermittently involved in theatre production after this, and in 1952 won the Arts Council Silver Medal for his play Leap in September.

The Ecliptic, Macleod's first book of poetry – a complex book divided into the signs of the zodiac – was published in 1930. It was approved for publication by T. S. Eliot at Faber and Faber after a strong recommendation from Ezra Pound, who thought highly of Macleod's abilities as a poet. A long-running correspondence was thus begun between the two poets. Macleod's first book was published alongside W. H. Auden's first book, Poems, and the Poetry (Chicago) editor Morton Dauwen Zabel hailed these two poets as "a Dawn in Britain" in his editorial. However, Macleod's next book, Foray of Centaurs, was considered "too Greek" for publication by Faber and Faber, and although this gained publication in Paris and Chicago, it was never to be published in the UK during his lifetime. Basil Bunting was an admirer of this early poetry, and claimed Macleod was the most important living British poet in his 'British' edition of Poetry (Chicago).

In 1937 Macleod became secretary of Huntingdonshire Divisional Labour Party and stood as a parliamentary candidate, but failed to gain election.

In 1938, Macleod became an announcer and newsreader at the BBC, and he began to write and publish poetry under the pseudonym "Adam Drinan". These poems dealt with the Highland clearances, and described the Scottish landscape in rich detail, using Gaelic assonances. He was one of the first to succeed in rendering the qualities of Gaelic poetry in English. These poems and verse plays won praise from many Scottish writers – Naomi Mitchison, Norman MacCaig, Edwin Muir, Compton Mackenzie, George Bruce, Sydney Goodsir Smith, Maurice Lindsay, and many more. Macleod's "Drinan" poetry was in much demand in both England and Scotland, as well as Ireland and the US. Editors such as Tambimuttu (of Poetry (London)), Maurice Lindsay (Poetry (Scotland)) and John Lehmann (Hogarth Press and New Writing), all requested and published many of his poems in the 1940s. Both "Drinan" and Macleod are included in Kenneth Rexroth's New British Poets anthology (1949), published for New Directions. The "Drinan" pseudonym was not publicly revealed until 1953, after which Hugh MacDiarmid commented it was "so long one of the best-kept secrets of the contemporary literary world". Adrian Stokes received and dealt with Macleod's 'Drinan' correspondence.

Macleod moved to Florence in 1955, where he lived until his death in 1984. His work was re-discovered in the late 1990s, and Cyclic Serial Zeniths from the Flux: Selected Poems of Joseph Macleod, edited and with an introduction by Andrew Duncan, was published by Waterloo Press in 2008.

James Fountain, British academic and poet, has continued to reintroduce Joseph Macleod’s works through Waterloo Press, including A Drinan Trilogy, collecting together all three of the “Drinan” published poems, The Cove, The Men of the Rocks, and The Ghosts of the Strath, edited and introduced with Andrew Duncan. Fountain has also edited The Ecliptic (2021) with an academic introduction, and produced Hidden Sun: The Poetry of Joseph Macleod (2022) - his PhD thesis translated into a monograph and a book-length, comprehensive analysis of the poet’s published work. Fountain also edited and introduced Macleod’s only published novel, an Aldous Huxley and HG Wells inspired tale, Overture to Cambridge (2023) - all published by Waterloo Press. A final volume, Women of the Happy Island and An Old Olive Tree, also edited and introduced by Fountain, is expected to be published in early 2027.

== Poems ==
From 'Cancer, or, The Crab', a section of The Ecliptic (London: Faber and Faber, 1930)

Moonpoison, mullock of sacrifice,
Suffuses the veins of the eyes
Till the retina, mooncoloured,
Sees the sideways motion of the cretin crab
Hued thus like a tortoise askew in the glaucous moonscape
A flat hot boulder it
Lividly in the midst of the Doldrums
Sidles
The lunatic unable to bear the silent course of constellations
Mad and stark naked
Sidles
The obol on an eyeball of a man dead from elephantiasis
Sidles
All three across heaven with a rocking motion.
The Doldrums: ‘region of calms and light baffling winds

near Equator.’

But the calms are rare
The winds baffling but not light
And the drunken boats belonging to the Crab Club
Rock hot and naked to the dunning of the moon
All in the pallescent Saragosso weed
And windbound, seeking distraction by the light of deliverance
For
What are we but the excrement of the non-existent noon?

(Truth like starlight crookedly)

What are we all but ‘burial grounds abhorred by the moon’?
And did the Maoris die of measles? So do we.
But there is no snow here, nor lilies.
The night is glutinous
In a broad hearth crisscross thorn clumps
Smoulder: distant fireback of copse
Throws back silence: glassen ashes gleam in pond
The constellations which have stopped working (?)
Shimmer. No dead leaf jumps.
On edge of a glowworm
Hangs out its state-recognized torchlamp
Blocks of flowers gape dumb as windows with blinds drawn
And in the centre the rugate trees
Though seeming as if they go up in smoke
Are held like cardboard where they are.
Bluehot it is queer fuel to make the moon move.
[...]
We trap our goldfinch trapping our souls therewinged
Sacrifice our mad gods to the madder gods:
We hymn the two sons of Leda and Zeus Aegis-bearer
We don’t. We drink and drivel. My

poor Catullus, do stop being such a
Fool. Admit that lost which as you watch is
gone. O, once the days shone very bright for
you, when where that girl you loved so (as no
other will be) called, you came and came. And
then there were odd things done and many
which you wanted and she didn’t not want.
Yes indeed the days shone very bright for
you. But now she doesn’t want it.

Don’t you either,

booby. Don’t keep chasing her. Don’t live in
misery, carry on, be firm, be hardened.
Goodbye girl: Catullus is quite hardened,
doesn’t want you, doesn’t ask, if you’re not
keen – though sorry you’ll be to be not asked.
Yes, poor sinner . . . what is left in life for
you? Who’ll now go with you? Who’ll be attracted?
Whom’ll you love now? Whom may you belong to?
Whom’ll you now kiss? Whose lips’ll you nibble?
- Now you, Catullus, you’ve decided to be hardened.

How can I be hardened when the whole world is fluid?
O Aphrodite Pandemos, your badgers rolling in the moonlit corn
Corn blue-bloom-covered carpeting the wind
Wind humming like distant rooks
Distant rooks busy like factory whirring metal
Whirring metallic starlings bizarre like cogwheels missing teeth
These last grinning like the backs of old motor cars
Old motor cars smelling of tragomaschality
Tragomaschality denoting the triumph of self over civilisation
Civilization being relative our to Greek

Greek to Persian
Persian to Chinese

Chinese politely making borborygms to show satisfaction
Satisfaction a matter of capacity
Capacity not significance: otherwise with an epigram
Epigrams – poems with a strabismus
Strabismus being as common spiritually as optically the moon
The moon tramping regular steps like a policeman past the

houses of the Zodiac

And the Zodiac itself, whirling and flaming sideways
Circling from no point returning to no point
Endlessly skidding as long as man skids, though never moving,

Wavers, topples, dissolves like a sandcastle into acidity.

Is there nothing more soluble, more gaseous, more imperceptible?
Nothing.

Riddle-me-ree from An Old Olive Tree (Edinburgh: M. MacDonald, 1971)

I was afraid and they gave me guts.
I was alone and they made me love.
Round that wild heat they built a furnace
and in the torment smelted me.
Out of my fragments came design:
I was assembled. I moved, I worked,
I grew receptive. Thanks to them
I have fashioned me.

Who am I?

== Bibliography ==
=== Poetry ===
- The Ecliptic (Faber and Faber, 1930)
- Foray of Centaurs (Sections published in This Quarter, Paris, 1931, The Criterion, 1931, and Poetry (Chicago), 1932)
- The Cove (French & Sons, 1940)
- The Men of the Rocks (Fortune Press, 1942)
- The Ghosts of the Strath (Fortune Press, 1943)
- Women of the Happy Island (MacLellan & Co., 1944)
- The Passage of the Torch: A Heroical-Historical Lay for the Fifth Centenary of the Founding of Glasgow University (Oliver and Boyd, 1951)
- Script From Norway (MacLellan & Co., 1953)
- An Old Olive Tree (M. Macdonald, 1971)

=== Literary Criticism ===
- Beauty and the Beast (Chatto and Windus, 1927; Viking Press (USA), 1928; Haskell House (USA), 1974)

=== Novel ===
- Overture to Cambridge (Allen & Unwin, 1936)

=== Prose ===
- People of Florence (Allen & Unwin, 1968)

=== Theatre History ===
- The New Soviet Theatre (Allen & Unwin, 1943)
- Actors Cross the Volga (Allen & Unwin, 1946)
- A Soviet Theatre Sketchbook (Allen & Unwin, 1951)
- Piccola Storia del Teatro Britannico (Sansoni (Florence), 1958. Reissued 1963)
- The Sisters d'Aranyi (Allen & Unwin, 1969)
- The Actor's Right to Act (Allen & Unwin, 1981)

=== Autobiography ===
- A Job at the BBC (MacLellan & Co., 1946)
