= George Mackay Brown =

Scottish poet (1921–1996)

- Born: 17 October 1921; Stromness, Orkney, Scotland
- Died: 13 April 1996 (aged 74); Stromness, Orkney, Scotland
- Education: University of Edinburgh
- Occupations: poet, author, dramatist

George Mackay Brown (17 October 1921 – 13 April 1996) was a Scottish poet, author and dramatist with a distinctly Orcadian character. He is widely regarded as one of the great Scottish poets of the 20th century.

== Biography ==
=== Early life and career ===
George Mackay Brown was born on 17 October 1921, the youngest of six children. His parents were John Brown, a tailor and postman, and Mhairi Mackay, a descendant of Clan Mackay who had been brought up in Braal, a hamlet near Strathy, Sutherland, as a native speaker of the Reay Country dialect of Scottish Gaelic.

Except for periods as a mature student in mainland Scotland, Brown lived all his life in the town of Stromness on Mainland, Orkney. One of his Stromness neighbours was his friend the artist Sylvia Wishart. Because of illness, his father was restricted in his work and he received no pension. The family had a history of depression and Brown's uncle, Jimmy Brown, may have died by suicide: his body was found in Stromness harbour in 1935. George Mackay Brown's youth was spent in poverty. During that period he contracted tuberculosis.

Brown's illness kept him from entering the army at the start of the Second World War and affected him so badly he could not live a normal working life. However, this gave him time and space in which to write. He started work in 1944 with The Orkney Herald, writing on Stromness news, and soon became a prolific journalist. He was encouraged in writing poetry by Francis Scarfe, who was billeted in the Browns' house for over a year from April 1944. After that he was helped in developing as a writer by Ernest Marwick, whose criticism he valued, and by Robert Rendall.

Brown's weekly "Island Diary" appeared in the Herald between 1945 and 1956. He used the pen name "Islandman" for the column. He was sometimes portrayed by "Spike" (Bob Johnston), the paper's cartoonist, wearing a prominent scarf in the regular Spotlight comic strip. The loss of the scarf on a trip to Shetland was described in 1951. The "now almost legendary scarf" was returned and put on display in a Stromness shop window. Jo Grimond, the local MP, said "the scarf should be retained as permanent inter-county trophy," but Brown complained that "they hadn't even washed it". Spike described it as "the scarf that launched 1,000 quips".

In 1947, Stromness voted to allow pubs to open again, the town having been "dry" since the 1920s. When the first bar opened in 1948, Mackay Brown first tasted alcohol. He found alcoholic drinks "a revelation; they flushed my veins with happiness; they washed away all cares and shyness and worries. I remember thinking to myself 'If I could have two pints of beer every afternoon, life would be a great happiness'". Alcohol played a considerable part in his life, but he says, "I never became an alcoholic, mainly because my guts quickly stalled."

=== Higher education and beginnings as poet ===
Brown was a mature student at Newbattle Abbey College in the 1951–1952 session, where the poet Edwin Muir, who had a great influence on his life as a writer, was warden. His return for the following session was interrupted by recurrent tuberculosis.

Having had poems published in several periodicals, his first volume of them, The Storm, appeared with the Orkney Press in 1954. Muir wrote in the foreword: "Grace is what I find in these poems.". Only three hundred copies were printed, and the imprint sold out within a fortnight. It was acclaimed in the local press.

Brown studied English literature at the University of Edinburgh. After publication of poems in a literary magazine, with the help of Muir, Brown had a second volume, Loaves and Fishes, published by the Hogarth Press in 1959. It was warmly received.

During this period he met many of the Scottish poets of his time – Sydney Goodsir Smith, Norman MacCaig, Hugh MacDiarmid, Tom Scott and others – with whom he often drank in Rose Street, Edinburgh. Here he also met Stella Cartwright, described as "The Muse in Rose Street". Brown was briefly engaged to her and began a correspondence that continued until her death in 1985.

In late 1960, Brown commenced teacher training at Moray House College of Education, but ill health prevented him remaining in Edinburgh. On his recovery in 1961, he found he was not suited to teaching and returned late in the year to his mother's house in Stromness, unemployed. At this juncture he was received into the Roman Catholic Church, converting from Presbyterianism of his childhood being baptised on 23 December and taking communion the next day. This followed about 25 years of pondering his religious beliefs. The conversion was not marked by any change in his daily habits, including his drinking.

=== Maturity as poet ===
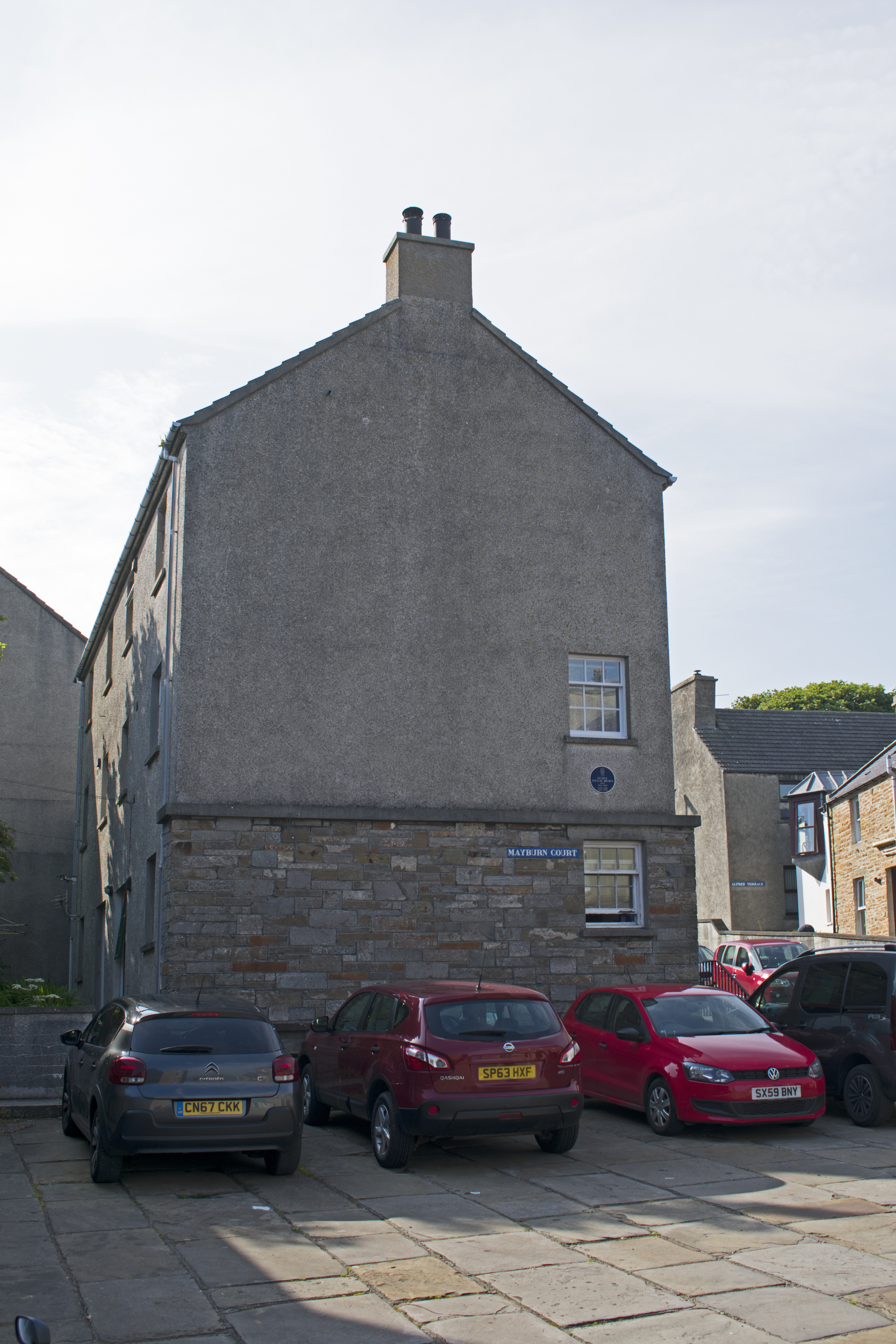
House at 3 Mayburn Court in Stromness where Brown lived between 1968 and 1996

After a period of unemployment and rejection of a volume of his poetry by the Hogarth Press, Brown did a postgraduate study on Gerard Manley Hopkins, although such work was not to his taste. This provided some occupation and income until 1964, when a volume of poetry, The Year of the Whale, was accepted.

Brown now found himself able to support himself financially for the first time, as he received new commissions. He received a bursary from the Scottish Arts Council in December 1965 as he was working on the volume of short stories, A Calendar of Love, which was issued to critical acclaim in February 1967. He was still troubled by excessive drinking, and that of Stella Cartwright. Later that year came the death of his mother, who had supported him despite disapproving of his drinking; she left an estate of £4.

Meanwhile, he had been working on An Orkney Tapestry, which includes essays on Orkney and more imaginative pieces, illustrated by Sylvia Wishart. The year 1968 also saw his one visit to Ireland, on a bursary from the Society of Authors. He met Seamus Heaney there, although his nervous condition reduced his ability to enjoy the visit.

In 1969, his short-story collection A Time to Keep received a positive welcome. The poet Charles Causley said, "I don't know anyone writing in this particular genre today who comes within a thousand miles of him." This was also the year in which he finished working on a six-part cycle of poems about Rackwick, published in 1971 as Fishermen with Ploughs. Meanwhile, An Orkney Tapestry was proving to be a commercial success.

By the late 1960s Brown's poetry was renowned internationally, so that the American poet Robert Lowell, for example, came to Orkney expressly to meet him.

During the summer of 1970, Brown met the musician Peter Maxwell Davies in Rackwick. Subsequently, Davies, who came to live in Rackwick, based a number of his works on the poetry and prose of George Mackay Brown.

Brown was now working on his first novel Greenvoe, the story of an imaginary Orkney community menaced by an undefined project called 'Operation Black Star'. The characters, with one exception, are not portrayed in any psychological depths. The exception is Mrs Mckee, mother of the (alcoholic) minister; Brown had intended her to be a minor character but he said of her, "I grew to love her more and more as the novel unfolded". The Dictionary of Literary Biography says that Greenvoe "ranks ... among the great prose poems of this century". When the novel was published in May 1972 it appeared prophetic because of the oil exploration beginning in the Orkney area. Brown found the resultant degree of celebrity a trial.

The story of Magnus Erlendsson, Earl of Orkney was one to which Brown frequently turned, and it was the theme of his next novel, Magnus, published in 1973. St Magnus's life is told in the Orkneyinga saga. The novel examined the themes of sanctity and self-sacrifice. Brown takes the theme of sacrifice into the 20th century by inserting in journalistic language an account of the death of Dietrich Bonhoeffer. While some critics see the work as "disjointed", Peter Maxwell Davies, for example, marks it as Brown's greatest achievement and used it as the basis of his opera The Martyrdom of St Magnus.

Brown was awarded an OBE in the 1974 New Year Honours. The period after completing Magnus, however, was marked by one of Brown's acute periods of mental distress. Yet he maintained a stream of writing: poetry, children's stories, and a weekly column in the local newspaper, The Orcadian, which ran from 1971 to the end of his life. A first selection of them appeared as Letter from Hamnavoe in 1975.

In mid-1976, Brown met Nora Kennedy, a Viennese woman jeweller and silversmith who was moving to South Ronaldsay. They had a brief affair and remained friends for the rest of his life. He said in early 1977 that this had been his most productive winter as a writer.

=== Later life and death ===
By early 1977, he was entering a period of depression which lasted intermittently for almost a decade, but maintained his working routine throughout. He also had severe bronchial problems, his condition becoming so serious that in early 1981 he was given the Last Sacraments.

These years saw him working on Time in a Red Coat, a novel Brown called "more a sombre fable", a meditation on the passage of time. It has been called "a novel in which the poet" – Brown as poet – "assumes an undoubted authority."

Two of the important women in Brown's life died about this time. Norah Smallwood, who had worked for his publishers Chatto & Windus and helped and encouraged him over the years, died in 1984. The other was Stella Cartwright, who died the next year. It was after her death that Brown began For the Islands I Sing, an autobiography not published until after his death. where Cartwright receives more space than any other individual, although he did not attend her funeral.

Brown later formed an intense, platonic attachment to Kenna Crawford, to whom he dedicated The Golden Bird: Two Orkney Stories and some poems in the volume The wreck of the Archangel. She bore a strong resemblance to Stella Cartwright. The Golden Bird won the James Tait Black Memorial Prize.

Between 1987 and 1989, Brown travelled to Nairn, including a visit to Pluscarden Abbey, to Shetland and to Oxford, making it the longest time he had left Orkney since his earlier studies in Edinburgh. The Oxford visit coincided with the centenary of the death of Gerard Manley Hopkins.

Shortly afterwards, Brown was diagnosed with bowel cancer, which required two major operations in 1990 and a lengthy stay in Foresterhill Hospital, Aberdeen. In his final years Brown wrote two more novels, Vinland and Beside the Ocean of Time. Vinland, which won Brown a £1,000 award from the Scottish Arts Council, traces the life of Ranald Sigmundson, a fictional character from the Viking era. Beside the Ocean of Time covers over 800 years of Orkney history through the dreams of an Orkney schoolboy. It meditates on the nature of time. It won the Saltire Scottish Book of the Year Award for 1994 and was listed for the Booker Prize for Fiction, which caused Brown acute anxiety.

During his last years Brown remained in his home, cared for by a network of friends, including Surinder Punjya (later principal of the Nesbitt Centre, Hong Kong), Gunnie Moberg, and Renée Simm. He continued working, writing the poems of Following a Lark and preparing the book for publication. The first copies were delivered to his home on the day he died, 13 April 1996, after a short illness. He was buried on 16 April, the feast day of Saint Magnus, with a funeral service at Kirkwall's St Magnus Cathedral, presided over by Father Mario Conti, Father Michael Spencer, and his later biographer Ron Ferguson. Peter Maxwell Davies played "Farewell to Stromness". His gravestone quotes the last two lines of his 1996 poem, "A work for poets":

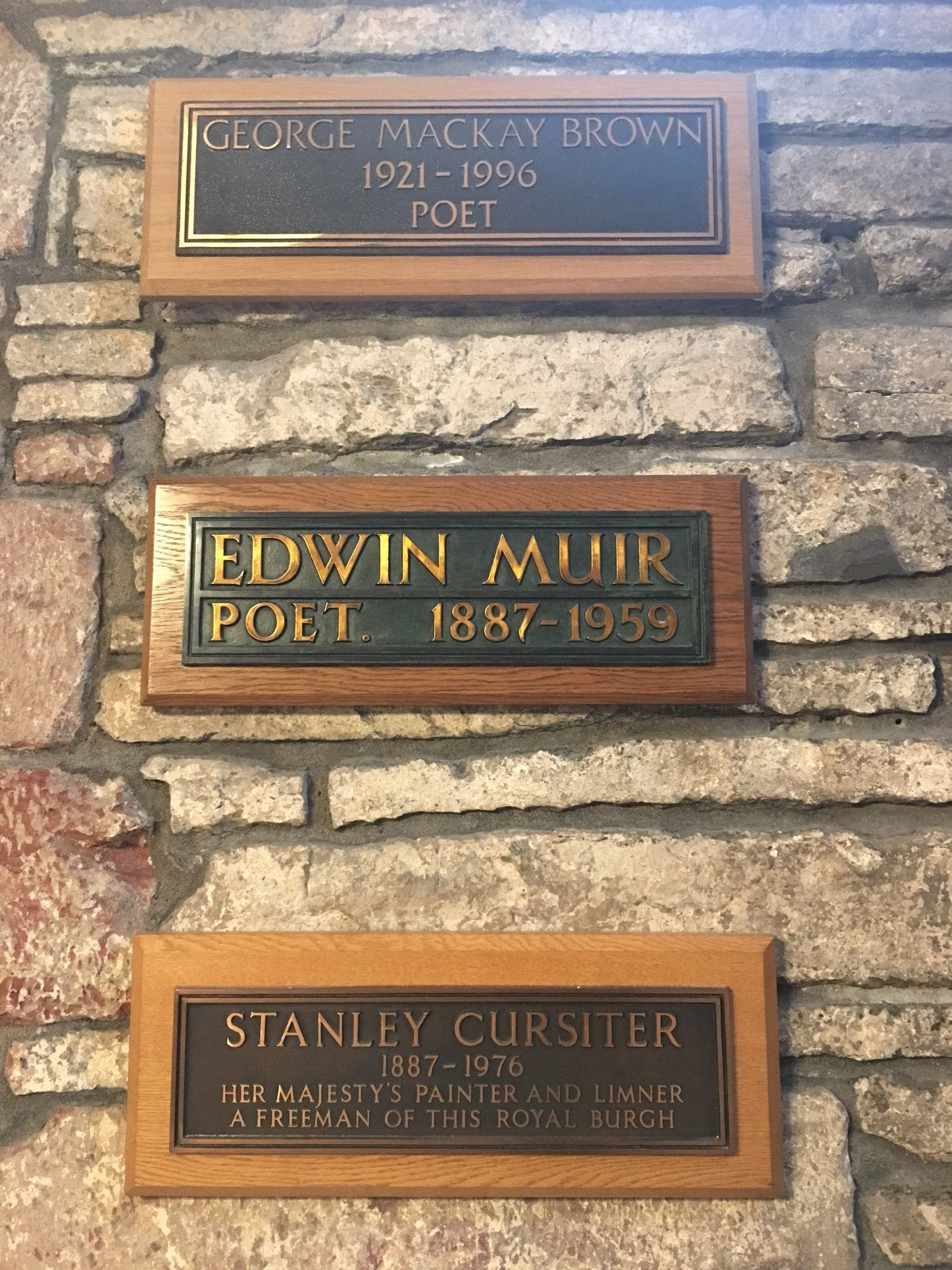
Memorial to George Mackay Brown in St Magnus Cathedral, Kirkwall, Orkney

Carve the runes
Then be content with silence.

In 2005, a memorial plaque to Brown was unveiled at the Writers' Museum in the Royal Mile, Edinburgh. It bears a quotation from his best-known poem, "Hamnavoe":

In the fire of images
Gladly I put my hand.'

== Legacy ==
The 2021 centenary of Brown's birth was marked by various events in Orkney and elsewhere in Scotland. In October, the Orkney Museum held an exhibition in Kirkwall marking Brown's life and work. It was called "Beside the Ocean of Time", after his last novel. The University of the Highlands and Islands created a collection of texts displayed as a digital 'wondrous scarf' during Book Week Scotland. The idea was inspired by Brown's colourful scarf.

Much of Brown's personal and literary archive is held by the National Library of Scotland, including his diaries and extensive collections of his correspondence.

== Work ==
Brown's poetry and prose have been seen as characterised by "the absence of frills and decoration; the lean simplicity of description, colour, shape and action reduced to essentials, which heightens the reality of the thing observed," while "his poems became informed by a unique voice that was his alone, controlled and dispassionate, which allowed every word to play its part in the narrative scheme of the unfolding poem."

Brown gained most inspiration from his native islands, for poems, stories and novels that ranged over time. He drew on the Icelandic Orkneyinga Saga, especially in his novel Magnus. Seamus Heaney said Brown's works transformed life by "passing everything through the eye of the needle of Orkney".

== Biographies ==
His autobiography, For the Islands I Sing, appeared shortly after his death. A literary biography, Interrogation of Silence by Rowena Murray and Brian Murray, ensued in 2004, George Mackay Brown: The Life, a more personal biography by Maggie Fergusson, in 2006, and George Mackay Brown: The Wound and the Gift by Ron Ferguson, a study of Brown's spiritual journey including his controversial move from Presbyterianism to Roman Catholicism, in 2011. The Seed Beneath the Snow by Joanna Ramsey, a personal memoir by a friend, was published in 2015.

== Selected works ==
=== Poetry collections ===
- The Storm (1954)
- Loaves and Fishes (1959)
- The Year of the Whale (1965)
- Fishermen with Ploughs (1971)
- Poems New and Selected (1971)
- Winterfold (1976)
- Voyages (1983)
- The Wreck of the Archangel (1989)
- Tryst on Egilsay (1989)
- Brodgar Poems (1992)
- Foresterhill (1992)
- Following a Lark (1996)
- Water (1996)
- Travellers: poems (2001)
- Collected Poems (2005)

=== Short story collections ===
- A Calendar of Love (1967)
- A Time to Keep (1969)
- Hawkfall (1974)
- The Sun's Net (1976)
- Andrina and Other Stories (1983)
- The Masked Fisherman and Other Stories (1989)
- The Sea-King's Daughter (1991)
- Winter Tales (1995)
- The Island of the Women and Other Stories (1998)
- Simple Fire (2021)

=== Plays ===
- A Spell for Green Corn (1970)
- Three Plays: The Loom of Light, The Well and The Voyage of Saint Brandon (1984)

=== Novels ===
- Greenvoe (1972)
- Magnus (1973)
- Time in a Red Coat (1984)
- The Golden Bird: Two Orkney Stories (1987) won the James Tait Black Memorial Prize for fiction.
- Vinland (1992)
- Beside the Ocean of Time (1994) shortlisted for Booker Prize and judged Scottish Book of the Year by the Saltire Society

=== Essays collections and autobiography ===
- An Orkney Tapestry (1969)
- Letters from Hamnavoe (1975)
- Under Brinkie's Brae (1979)
- Portrait of Orkney (1981)
- Rockpools and Daffodils: An Orcadian Diary, 1979–91 (1992)
- For the Islands I Sing: An Autobiography (1997)
- Stained Glass Windows (1998)
- Northern Lights (1999) (Includes Poetry)
- The First Wash of Spring (2006)

=== Children's story collection ===
- The Two Fiddlers (1974)
- Pictures in the Cave (1977)
- Six Lives of Fankle the Cat (1980)

=== Discography ===
- For the Islands I Sing
