= Maurice Lindsay (broadcaster) =

Scottish broadcaster, writer and poet (1918–2009)

Maurice Lindsay CBE (21 July 1918 – 30 April 2009) was a Scottish broadcaster, writer and poet. He was born in Glasgow. He was educated at The Glasgow Academy where he was a pupil from 1928 to 1936. In later life, he served as an honorary governor of the school.

After serving in World War II, with the 7th Cameronians, he became a radio broadcaster, also editing the 1946 anthology Modern Scottish Poetry, and writing music criticism. He later was programme controller at Border Television.

In 1962, Scottish composer Thea Musgrave set five of his children's poems in Scots to music for voice and piano, in a song cycle called A Suite o Bairnsangs.

His Collected Poems (1974) drew on 12 published collections. He wrote a number of other books, including one on Robert Burns and a seminal biography of the composer Francis George Scott and mid-twentieth century Scottish classical music, entitled Francis George Scott and the Scottish Renaissance (1980).

Dr Lindsay was director of the Scottish Civic Trust, president of the Association for Scottish Literary Studies from 1989 to 1993, and was honorary secretary-general of Europa Nostra.

== Select Bibliography ==
- The Discovery of Scotland, Robert Hale, 1964, ASIN B0000CM48Y
- As I Remember: Ten Scottish Authors recall How Writing Began for Them, Editor, Robert Hale, 1979, ISBN 9780709173212
- Francis George Scott and the Scottish Renaissance, Paul Harris, 1980 ISBN 9780904505436
- Count All Men Mortal: A History of Scottish Provident 1837 - 1987, Canongate Press, 1987, ISBN 0-86241-127-0
- Scottish Comic Verse, Editor, Robert Hale, 1981, ISBN 9780709185932
- The Castles of Scotland, Constable & Robinson, 1986, ISBN 9780094646001
- The Edinburgh Book of Twentieth-century Scottish Poetry (co-edited with Lesley Duncan), Edinburgh University Press, 2005, ISBN 9780748620159

== Reviews ==
- Ross, Raymond J. (1980), Prophet Unhonoured, review of Francis George Scott and the Scottish Renaissance, in Cencrastus No. 4, Winter 1980–81, p. 37, ISSN 0264-0856
- Donaldson, William (1981), review of Scottish Comic Verse, in Murray, Glen (ed.), Cencrastus No. 6, Autumn 1981, p. 43

== Footnotes ==
- "Maurice Lindsay". The Daily Telegraph. 4 June 2009.
- Riach, Alan (12 May 2009). "Maurice Lindsay". The Guardian.
- "Maurice Lindsay (1918 - 2009)". scottishpoetrylibrary.org.uk.
