= Neil Mackie =

Scottish singer (born 1946)

Neil Mackie CBE (born 1946) is a Scottish tenor. During his career as a singer, he was associated with the works of 20th-century composers, particularly Benjamin Britten, Kenneth Leighton, and Peter Maxwell Davies. He played the lead role in Leighton's opera Columba, and created the title role in Davies's opera The Martyrdom of St Magnus and Sandy in his The Lighthouse and performed in the world premieres of Davies's Into the Labyrinth, cantata for tenor and chamber orchestra, and The Jacobite Rising. He has also premiered vocal works by Elliott Carter (In Sleep, in Thunder), Hans Werner Henze (Three Auden Songs), Kenneth Leighton (Earth, Sweet Earth Opus 96), and songs by Benjamin Britten.

== Life and career ==
Mackie was born in Aberdeen and studied at the Royal Scottish Academy of Music and Drama. Following further studies at the Royal College of Music, he studied in Munich with Ernst Haefliger then with Peter Pears. Mackie made his professional debut in London when he sang as a soloist with English Chamber Orchestra under Raymond Leppard

From 1983 he taught singing at the Royal College of Music and in 1993 became head of the Department of Vocal Studies there. He left the Royal College of Music at the end of 2008. He now teaches singing at the Royal Academy of Music. Mackie was made a Commander of the Most Excellent Order of the British Empire in the 1996 New Year Honours for his services to music

== Sources ==
- Cummings, David (ed.), International Who's Who in Music, Routledge, 2000. ISBN 0-948875-53-4
- Craggs, Stewart R., Benjamin Britten: a bio-bibliography, Greenwood Publishing Group, 2002, pp. 72–77. ISBN 0-313-29531-X
- The Independent, The New Year Honours: The Prime Minister's List, 30 December 1995. Retrieved 23 January 2010
- Link, John F., Elliott Carter: a guide to research, Taylor & Francis, 2000, p. 37. ISBN 0-8153-2432-4
- MaxOpus (official web site of Peter Maxwell Davies), Work Detail: Into the Labyrinth
- Pears, Peter, The Travel Diaries of Peter Pears, 1936-1978, Boydell & Brewer, 1999 p. 202. ISBN 0-85115-741-6
- Royal Academy of Music, Neil Mackie
- Schott Music Three Auden Songs
- Scottish Music Centre, Jacobite Rising, The (1997)
- Smith, Carolyn, Kenneth Leighton: a bio-bibliography, Praeger, 2004, pp. 12, 18–19, 58, 73, . ISBN 0-313-30515-3
