= Hamnavoe (poem) =

"Hamnavoe" is a poem by the Scottish poet George Mackay Brown. It is one of his best-known works and is learned off by heart by many Orkney children at school.

Hamnavoe is the Viking name for the town of Stromness, where Brown spent most of his life. He refers to it as such in many of his works, including Letters from Hamnavoe and "Hamnavoe Market". The poem is in part a memorial to his father, John Brown, a postman, and describes the postman's round in Stromness and the people he meets on his way. Brown, who never read his work in public, chose this to be recorded as one of five poems representative of his work, now held by the Poetry Archive.

In 2005, a memorial plaque to George Mackay Brown was unveiled in the Writers' Museum, on the Royal Mile, Edinburgh. It is engraved with a quotation from "Hamnavoe":

In the fire of images
Gladly I put my hand

Extracts from the poem are inscribed on windows at the Stromness Ferry Terminal, and quotations can also be seen on board the ferry MV Hamnavoe.

In 2009, the poem was selected by the BBC as representative of George Mackay Brown and his relationship with "place", and became the subject of a documentary introduced by Owen Sheers in the series A Poet’s Guide to Britain.
