= Mary Symon =

Scottish poet (1863-1938)

- Born: September 25, 1863; Dufftown, Scotland
- Died: May 27, 1938 (aged 74)
- Known for: Poetry

Mary Symon (25 September 1863 – 27 May 1938) was a Scottish poet who wrote in Scots with a regional and rural focus. Her work was praised by Hugh MacDiarmid during the Scottish Renaissance.

== Life and education ==
Mary was born to John Symon (1836–1908), a landowner and saddler, and Isabella Duncan (1837–1924) in Dufftown, on the estate of Pittyvaich. Her father was a prominent figure in local life, and helped to found the Pittyvaich Distillery. Mary was educated first at Mortlach public school, and then at the Edinburgh Institute For Young Ladies, where she met Logie Robertson and attended lectures by David Masson, at the University of Edinburgh. She was a graduate of The University of St Andrews.

== Works ==
Mary Symon grew up fluent in the Scots of rural Banffshire.

Her first works are dated to 1876, and she utilised various pseudonyms for publication.

Her work was influenced by the First World War: her 1916 poem 'The Glen's Muster-Roll' is written from the perspective of a local schoolmaster, reflecting on the future of the boys in his community, while her poem 'A Whiff o' Hame' was sent to troops in the same year as part of a Christmas book. 'After Neuve Chapelle', written in 1915, describes the losses suffered by the Gordon Highlanders at the Front.

The first edition of Symon's work, Deveron Days was published in 1933, and sold out instantly, moving straight to a second edition. In the same year she was invited to write a school song for Robert Gordon's College. Prior to 1933 her work was published in magazines such as the Aberdeen University Review and The Scots Magazine, and was included in Hugh MacDiarmid's Northern Numbers anthologies in 1921 and 1922. The Hog's Back Press published her Collected Poems in 2015.

She had skill in translation, with three poems by Béranger represented in her work Deveron Days. She also had a strong knowledge of Banffshire traditions and customs, and wrote and lectured on these.

== Legacy and death ==
Following her death in 1938, Symon was buried next to her parents in Mortlach Old Kirk cemetery in Dufftown.

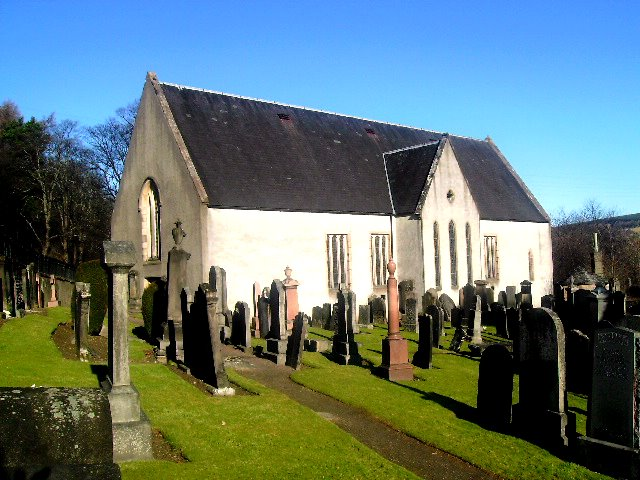
Mortlach Kirk, Dufftown
