= Erik Chisholm =

Scottish composer and conductor (1904–1965)

- Born: 4 January 1904; Glasgow, Scotland
- Died: 8 June 1965 (aged 61); Cape Town, South Africa
- Occupations: Composer and conductor
- Spouse(s): Diana Brodie (1st) and Lillias Scott (2nd)

Erik William Chisholm (4 January 1904 – 8 June 1965) was a Scottish composer, pianist, organist and conductor sometimes known as "Scotland's forgotten composer". According to his biographer, Chisholm "was the first composer to absorb Celtic idioms into his music in form as well as content, his achievement paralleling that of Bartók in its depth of understanding and its daring", which led some to give him the nickname "MacBartók". As composer, performer and impresario, he played an important role in the musical life of Glasgow between the two World Wars and was a founder of the Celtic Ballet and, together with Margaret Morris, created the first full-length Scottish ballet, The Forsaken Mermaid. After World War II he was Professor and Head of the South African College of Music at the University of Cape Town for 19 years until his death. Chisholm founded the South African College of Music opera company in Cape Town and was a vital force in bringing new operas to Scotland, England and South Africa. By the time of his death in 1965, he had composed over a hundred works.

== Early life and education ==
Erik Chisholm was the son of John Chisholm, master house painter, and his wife, Elizabeth McGeachy Macleod. He left Queen's Park School, Glasgow, at the early age of 13 due to ill health but showed a talent for music composition and some of his pieces were published during his childhood. He had piano lessons with Philip Halstead at Glasgow's Athenaeum School of Music, now the Royal Conservatoire of Scotland, and later studied the organ under Herbert Walton, the organist at Glasgow Cathedral. By the time he was 12 he was giving organ recitals including an important one in Kingston upon Hull. The pianist Lev Pouishnoff then became his principal teacher and mentor. In 1927 he travelled to Nova Scotia, Canada, where he was appointed the organist and choirmaster at the Westminster Presbyterian Church, New Glasgow, and director of music at Pictou Academy.

A year later he returned to Scotland and from 1928 to 1933 he was organist at St Matthew's Church, Bath Street, Glasgow, later renamed Renfield St Stephen's and now St Andrew's West. In 1933 he was appointed organist at Glasgow's Barony Church; however, as he had no School Leaving Certificate, he could not study at a university. Due to the influence of his future wife, Diana Brodie, he approached several influential music friends for letters of support for an exemption to enter university. In 1928, he was accepted to study music at the University of Edinburgh, under his friend and mentor, the renowned musicologist Sir Donald Tovey. Chisholm graduated with a Bachelor of Music degree in 1931 and as Doctor of Music in 1934. While at university, he had formed the Scottish Ballet Society in 1928 and the Active Society for the Propagation of Contemporary Music in 1929 with fellow composer Francis George Scott and Chisholm's friend Pat Shannon. From 1930 to 1934 Chisholm also worked as a music critic for the Glasgow Weekly Herald and the Scottish Daily Express.

== Scottish career and World War II ==
After his education, Chisholm's work was described as "daring and original", according to Sir Hugh Roberton, while also displaying a strong Scottish character in works such as his Piano Concerto No. 1, subtitled Piobaireachd (1930), the Straloch Suite (1933) and the Sonata An Riobhan Dearg (1939). In 1933 he was the soloist at the première of his Dance Suite for Orchestra and Piano with the Royal Concertgebouw Orchestra at an International Society for Contemporary Music festival in Amsterdam. He also played the Scottish premieres of Bartók's Piano Concerto No. 1 and Rachmaninoff's Piano Concerto No. 3. From 1930 he was the musical director of the Glasgow Grand Opera Society which performed in the city's Theatre Royal, conducting the British premières of Mozart's Idomeneo in 1934 and Berlioz's Les Troyens and Béatrice et Bénédict in 1935 and 1936, respectively. He was also the founding conductor of both the Barony Opera Society, the Scottish Ballet Society, the Professional Organists' Association, and in 1938 he was appointed music director of the Celtic Ballet. As director he composed four works in collaboration with Margaret Morris, the most famous being The Forsaken Mermaid; the first full-length Scottish ballet. Chisholm had many friends in the music world, including composers like Béla Bartók, Bax, Alan Bush, Delius, Hindemith, Ireland, Medtner, Kaikhosru Sorabji, Szymanowski and Walton, and invited many of them to Glasgow to perform their works under the auspices of the Active Society.

At the outbreak of World War II, Chisholm, a conscientious objector, was declared unfit for military service on the basis of poor eyesight and a crooked arm. During the war he conducted performances with the Carl Rosa Opera Company in 1940, and later joined the Entertainments National Service Association as a colonel touring Italy with the Anglo-Polish Ballet in 1943 and served as musical director to the South East Asia Command between 1943 and 1945. He first formed a multi-racial orchestra in India, but after arguments with his superior, Col. Jack Hawkins, he was removed to Singapore. Here in 1945 he founded the Singapore Symphony Orchestra. Many of the musicians were ex-prisoners of War, and from them Chisholm recruited Szymon Goldberg as leader. Goldberg had successfully hidden his Stradivarius violin up a chimney in the prison camp for three and a half years. Chisholm created a truly cosmopolitan orchestra of fifteen nationalities from East and West, which gave 50 concerts in Malaya within six months. After returning to Scotland, Chisholm married his second wife, singer and poet Lillias Scott (1913-2018), the daughter of Scottish composer Francis George Scott. In 1946 he was appointed professor of music at the University of Cape Town and director of the South African College of Music.

== South African career ==
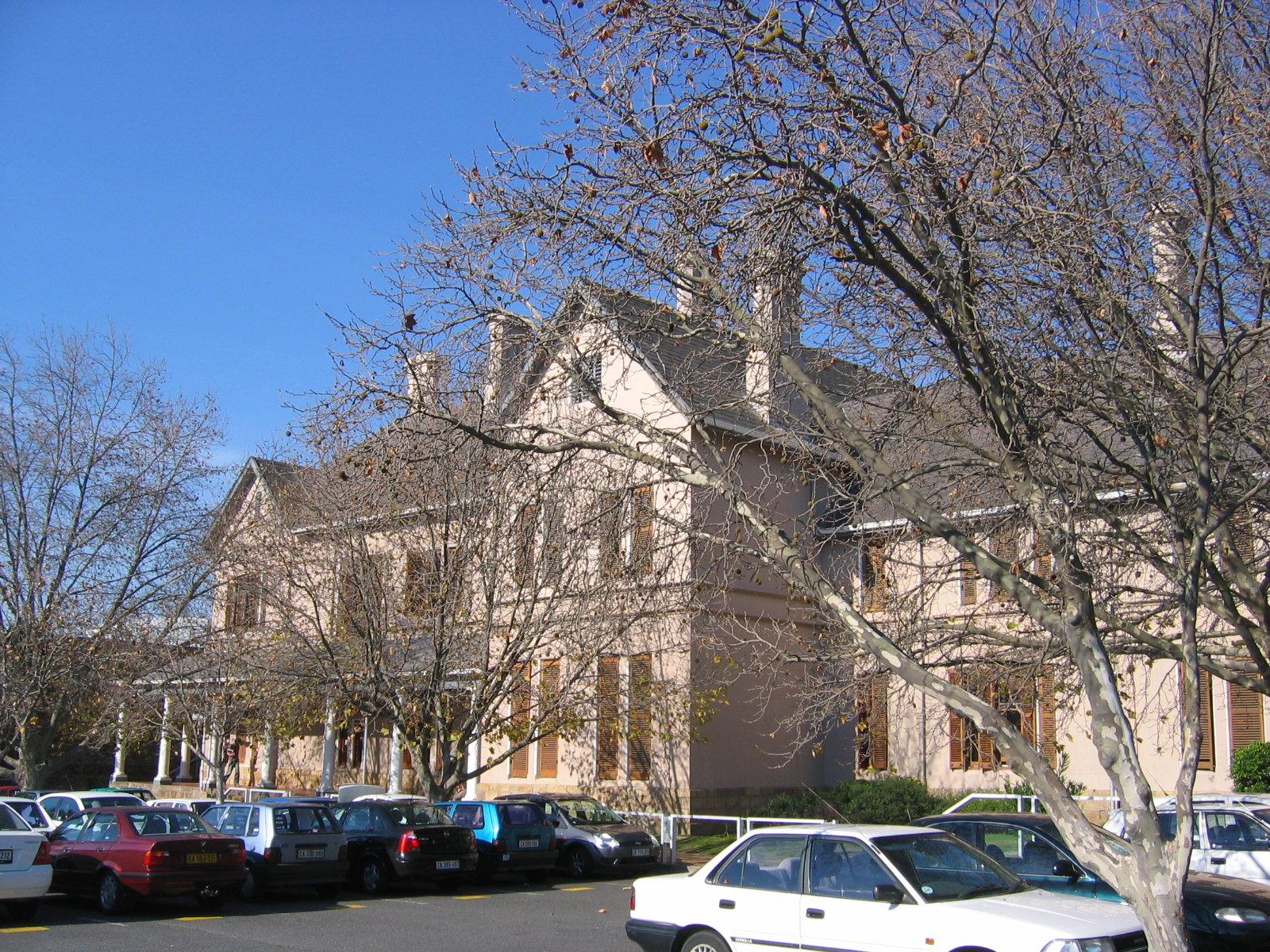
Strubenholm, home of the SA College of Music

Chisholm's obituary in The Edinburgh Tatler recalled that "the three highlights of his life were in hearing at age seven Beethoven's Moonlight Sonata played by Frederic Lamond on a piano roll; becoming acquainted with the music of India and lastly being offered the chair of music at Cape Town University in 1947". That year, Chisholm revived the South African College of Music where he eventually would teach composer Stefans Grové and singer Désirée Talbot. Using Edinburgh University as his model, Chisholm appointed new staff, extended the number of courses, and introduced new degrees and diplomas. In order to encourage budding South African musicians he founded the South African National Music Press in 1948. With the assistance of the Italian baritone Gregorio Fiasconaro, Chisholm also established the college's opera company in 1951 and opera school in 1954. In addition, Chisholm founded the South African section of the International Society for Contemporary Music (ISCM) in 1948, assisted in the founding of the Maynardville Open-Air Theatre on 1 December 1950, and pursued an international conducting career.

The South African College of Music's opera company became a national success and toured Zambia and the United Kingdom. In the winter of 1956, Chisholm's ambitious festival of South African Music and Musicians achieved popular success in London with a programme of Wigmore Hall concerts and the London première at the Rudolf Steiner Theatre of Bartók's opera Bluebeard's Castle. The company also performed Menotti's The Consul as well as Chisholm's own opera The Inland Woman, based on a drama by Irish author Mary Lavin. In 1952 Szymon Goldberg premièred his violin concerto at the Van Riebeeck Music Festival in Cape Town. His opera trilogy Murder in Three Keys enjoyed a six-week season in New York City in 1954, and two years later he was invited to Moscow to conduct the Moscow State Orchestra in his second piano concerto The Hindustani. In 1961, his company premièred South African composer John Joubert's first opera, Silas Marner.

Chisholm did not support the South African policy of apartheid and had socialist leanings. Chisholm convinced Ronald Stevenson, a fellow Scot, to perform at the University of Cape Town. During a performance of Stevenson's Passacaglia, the programme made references to Lenin's slogan of peace, bread and land and also in salute of the "emergent Africa". The following day, South African police searched Chisholm's study in a failed attempt to link him with working for the USSR.

== Later years and legacy ==
Composing at his Petrof piano with Towser, his concert-going Spaniel, at his feet.

Sir Arnold Bax called Erik Chisholm "the most progressive composer that Scotland has ever produced". After 19 years at the South African College of Music, Dr. Chisholm composed an additional twelve operas drawing inspiration from "sources as varied as Hindustan, the Outer Hebrides, the neo-classical and baroque, pibroch, astrology and literature".

Chisholm died of a heart attack at age 61 and left all his music to the University of Cape Town. Although he composed over 100 works, only 17 were published in his lifetime, of which 14 were issued in printed score. After his death performances of his music, especially in Britain, fell into neglect but admirers have continued to press for his music to be heard more regularly. His style was called varied, eclectic, and challenging, and his modernism was sometimes considered difficult for audiences. However, in recent years through the efforts of the Erik Chisholm Trust, founded by Chisholm's daughter Morag, there has been a revival of interest in his music and several works, including orchestral, piano and vocal pieces, have been revived and recorded. Also, many of his unpublished works, formerly in manuscript, have been typeset and are available through the Erik Chisholm Trust.

He had a lifelong interest in Scottish music and published a collection of Celtic folk-songs in 1964. He was also interested in Czech music, and completed his book The Operas of Leoš Janáček shortly before his death. His services to Czech music were formally recognized in 1956, when he became one of the few non-Czech musicians to be awarded the Dvořák medal. The Manuscripts and Archives Library at the University of Cape Town holds the Chisholm collection of papers and manuscripts; his published scores are in the College of Music library and many copies are in the Scottish Music Centre in Glasgow. In addition, an important collection of manuscripts, letters and other memorabilia left to Chisholm's daughter Morag (including his extensive correspondence with Sorabji) is now housed in the Archive of the Royal Conservatoire of Scotland in Glasgow. In his memory, the South African College of Music offers a memorial scholarship in his name and the Scottish International Piano Competition awards an Erik Chisholm Memorial Prize.

The biography of Erik Chisholm, written by John Purser with the foreword by Sir Charles Mackerras, Chasing A Restless Muse: Erik Chisholm, Scottish Modernist (1904–1965), was published on 19 June 2009. An official launch was held at the Royal Birmingham Conservatoire, part of Birmingham City University on 22 October 2009 which was attended by his widow, his daughter Morag, two of his granddaughters and great-grandsons. His widow, Lillias, married the clarinettist John Forbes.

== Works ==
Erik Chisholm wrote well over 100 works, including 35 orchestral works, 7 concertante works (including a violin concerto and two piano concertos), 7 works for orchestra and voice or chorus, 54 piano works, 3 organ works, 43 songs, 8 choral part-songs, 7 ballets, and 9 operas including one on Robert Burns. He also made several interesting arrangements by composers such as Handel and Mozart. He arranged a string orchestra version of the Symphony for Solo Piano, Op. 39 Nos. 4–7 by Charles-Valentin Alkan, a composer still largely unknown at that time, the original of which has been said to surpass even the Transcendental Études of Franz Liszt in scale and difficulty.

Pianist Murray McLachlan divided Chisholm's works into four periods: the Early Period, the "Scottish" Period, the Neoclassical Period and the "Hindustani" Period. The "Early Period" is extremely large, beginning with teenage efforts including a Sonatina in G minor, written at 18, and clearly showing something of the influence of John Blackwood McEwen.

The "Scottish" Period began in the early 1930s where his works were tinged with a distinct Scottish colouring influenced by folk music, indicating most persuasively the ambitions of composers like Chisholm's contemporary Béla Bartók, to create a style based on the music of his ancestors and countrymen. Chisholm's Sonatine Ecossaise, 4 Elegies, Scottish Airs, Piano Concerto no. 1 "Piobaireachd" and Dance Suite display a percussive bite and energy influenced by Bartók and Prokofiev with much use of dissonances and note clusters along with material derived from Scottish folksong, bagpipe music and dance figurations. The folk elements are so deeply integrated in this style that some have referred to Chisholm as "MacBartók".

Chisholm's Neoclassical Period refers to several of his works which were inspired by ancient and obscure motifs from the pre-Classical era. His Sonatina no. 3, evidently based on several ricercare motifs originally written by Dalza, fuses Brittenesque harmonies and gentle dissonances in quintessentially pianistic textures.

The music of his "Hindustani" period in the late 1940s and early 1950s reflects Chisholm's wartime travels in the East, his interest in the occult and perhaps his friendship with Sorabji. Important examples of this period are his 2nd "Hindustani" Piano Concerto, the Violin Concerto, the one-act opera Simoon and the Six Nocturnes, Night Song of the Bards. These compositions display luscious textures, transcendental technical demands and intensity that are comparable to works by Szymanowski and Sorabji and to some extent an atonality reminiscent of Alban Berg.

Chisholm's complete piano music has been recorded on 7 CDs on the Divine Art label by Murray McLachlan. His two piano concertos and his Dance Suite were recorded by Danny Driver, and the Violin Concerto by Matthew Trusler, all on Hyperion Records. The live premiere (2015) of the full score of his opera Simoon was recorded by Delphian Records, and a video produced by Music Co-operative Scotland was premiered in July 2020.

Chisholm's interest in Scottish song stemmed from a gift he received, aged 10, of Patrick MacDonald's A Collection of Scottish Airs, published in 1784. His songs include the Seven Poems of Love (setting words by his wife Lillias Scott) and settings of William Soutar, including A Dirge for Summer.

== Writings ==
- Chisholm, E. (1971) The Operas of Leoš Janáček ISBN 0-08-012854-8.
