= William Soutar =

Scottish poet (1898–1943)

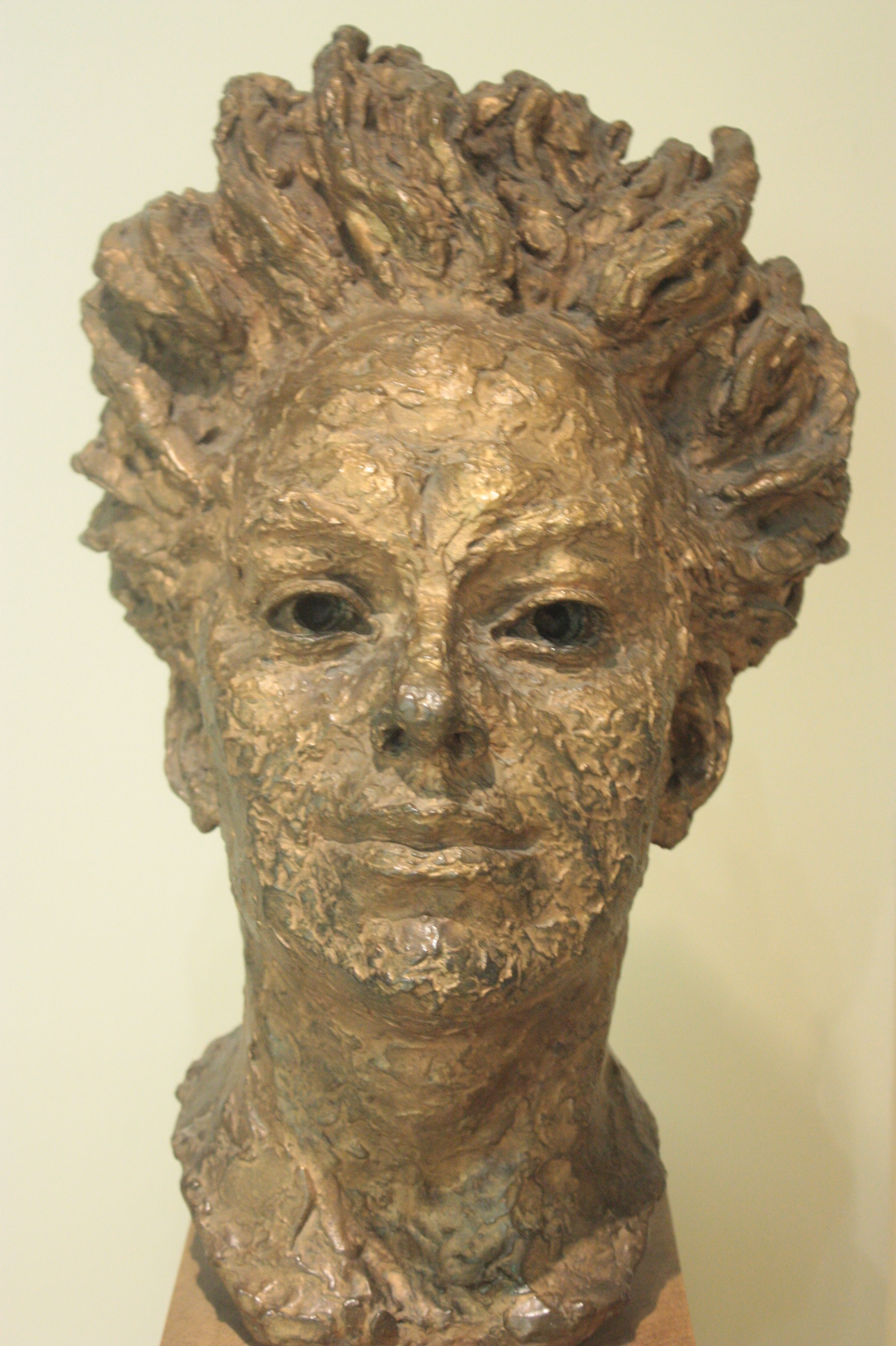
William Soutar by Benno Schotz 1959

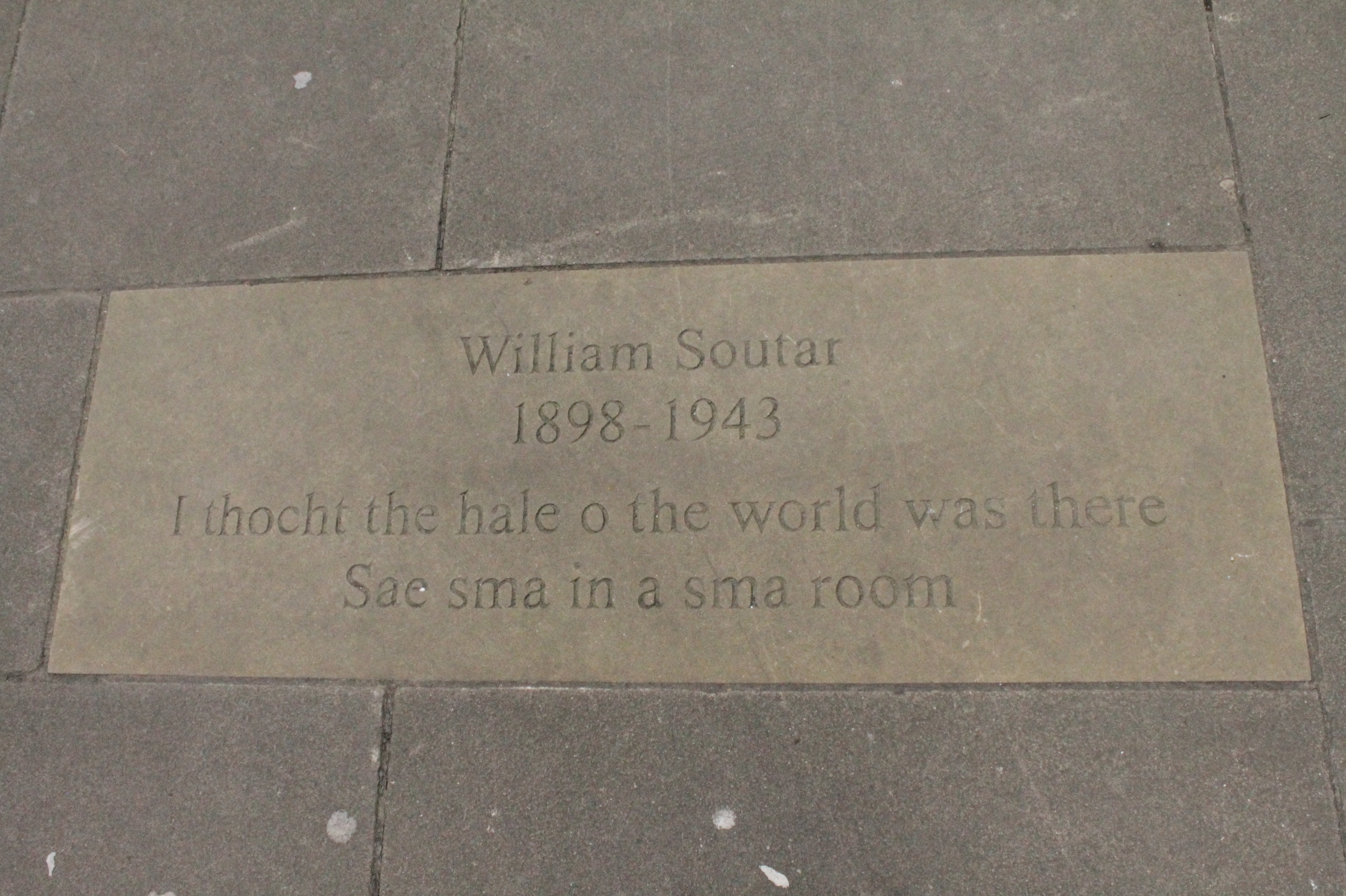
Pavement poem (William Soutar) Writers Museum, Edinburgh

William Soutar (28 April 1898 – 15 October 1943) was a Scottish poet and diarist who wrote in English and in Braid Scots. He is known best for his epigrams.

== Life and works ==
William Soutar was born on 28 April 1898 on South Inch Terrace in Perth, Scotland, the child of John Soutar (1871–1958), master joiner, and his wife, Margaret Smith (1870–1954), they also had an adopted daughter Evelyn Soutar taken in when Margaret's first cousin died, who wrote poetry. His parents belonged to the United Free Church of Scotland. He was educated at Southern District School, Perth, and at Perth Academy, before joining the wartime Royal Navy in 1916. By the time he was demobilized in November 1918, he was suffering from what would be diagnosed in 1924 as ankylosing spondylitis, a form of chronic inflammatory arthritis.

Soutar began to study medicine at the University of Edinburgh in 1919, but switched to English. He did not excel academically, but began to contribute to the student magazine. His first volume, Gleanings by an Undergraduate (1923), appeared at his father's expense, as did several others. He began to keep a diary on 18 April 1919. During that period he made contact with Hugh MacDiarmid, then in Montrose, and with Ezra Pound. MacDiarmid at the time was abandoning poetry in English in favour of "synthetic Scots", a literary language compiled from dialects and earlier writers such as Robert Henryson and William Dunbar.

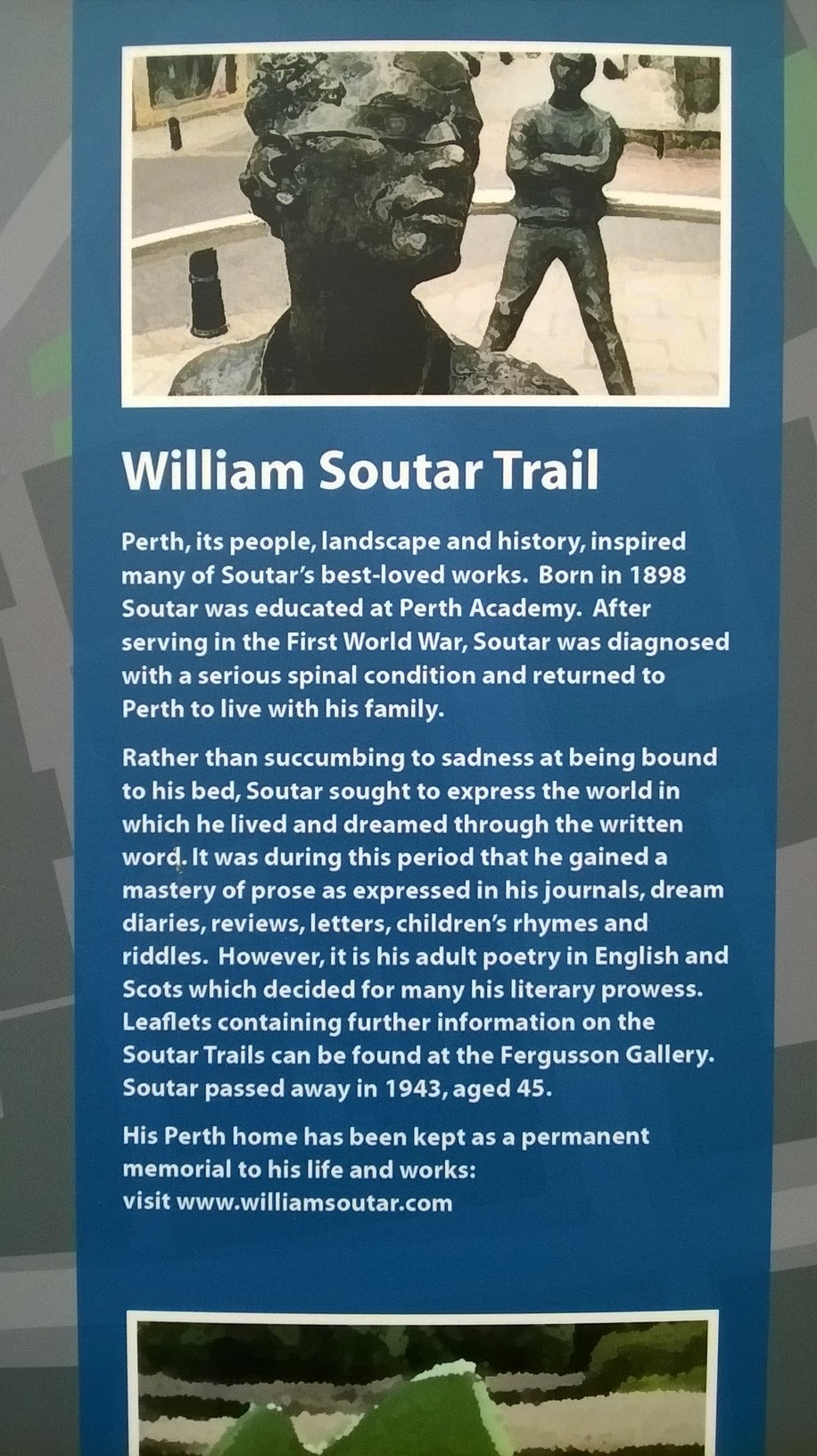
William Soutar Trail, Perth

Soutar's work correspondingly altered radically, and he became a leading figure of the Scottish Literary Renaissance, whom posthumous editors would dub "one of the greatest poets Scotland has produced." His family adopted an orphaned cousin of his, seven-year-old Evelyn, in 1927, and this became a spur to him to write also for children. Seeds in the Wind (1933) was a volume of "bairn-rhymes" in Scots.

By 1930 Soutar was bedridden with his disease. He died in 1943 of tuberculosis contracted in 1929. He is buried in Perth's Jeanfield and Wellshill Cemetery. His collected poems, edited by MacDiarmid, were published in 1948. His journal, The Diary of a Dying Man, appeared posthumously. One form of verse he used was the cinquain (now known as American cinquains), which he preferred to call epigrams.

Interest in Soutar's work in Scots and English and for adults and children, has revived considerably since the 1980s, although none of his verse was in print for his centenary in 1998. Gang Doun wi' a Sang, Joy Hendry's celebration of the life and work of William Soutar, was produced at Perth Theatre from 12 to 27 October 1990. In 2014 he was the subject of a BBC radio programme: The Still Life Poet by Liz Lochhead.

== Musical settings ==
- Benjamin Britten set twelve Soutar poems for tenor voice and piano in the 1969 song cycle Who Are These Children? (op. 84).
- Erik Chisholm set a range of Soutar's verse, including Summer Song, A Dirge for Summer, and the humorous settings The Prodigy, The Braw Plum and The Three Worthies.
- James MacMillan set several of his Scots-language poems in a style that drew on traditional folk song: "Scots Song" (aka 'The Tryst', 1991), "Ballad" (1994) and "The Children" (1995) were collected as Three Scottish Songs in 1995.
- The album In a Sma' Room, with settings by Debra Salem, Kevin Mackenzie and Paul Harrison, appeared in 2021.

== Selected published works ==
- Gleanings by an Undergraduate (Paisley: Alexander Gardner, 1923)
- Brief Words. One Hundred Epigrams (Edinburgh/London: The Moray Press, 1935)
- Seeds in the Wind, Poems in Scots for Children (London: Andrew Dakers, 1943)
- Diaries of a Dying Man (Edinburgh: Canongate Press, 1954) ISBN 0-86241-347-8. In fact only a short selection
- The Collected Poems of William Soutar, ed. Hugh MacDiarmid (London: Andrew Dakers, 1948)
- Poems of William Soutar: a New Selection, ed. W. R. Aitken (Edinburgh: Scottish Academic Press, 1988) ISBN 0707305543
- The Diary of a Dying Man (Edinburgh: Chapman, 1991) ISBN 0906772311
- At the Year's Fa': Selected Poems in Scots and English (Perth: Perth & Kinross Libraries, 2001) ISBN 0905452356

== External resources ==
- The Scottish Poetry Library site includes a handful of Soutar's poems: Retrieved 16 August 2013. More can be found in Retrieved 16 August 2013 and Retrieved 16 August 2013.
- A sample of Soutar's cinquains.
