= Tom Scott (poet) =

Scottish poet

Thomas McLaughlin Scott (6 June 1918 – 7 August 1995) was a Scottish poet, editor, and prose writer. His writing is closely tied to the New Apocalypse, the New Romantics, and the Scottish Renaissance.

Scott was born in Glasgow, Scotland, the son of a Clydeside boilermaker. With the onset of the Depression, the family moved to St. Andrews in Fife, where Tom worked briefly as a butcher's assistant before becoming an apprentice stonemason in his uncle's business.

During World War II he served in the British Army in Britain and Nigeria. After the war he lived in London for a while, moving in the same literary and social circles as Kathleen Raine, Dylan Thomas and Louis MacNeice. He then studied at the University of Edinburgh where he graduated with an M.A. with Honours in English Literature and a PhD for research on the poetry of William Dunbar.

Scott's first poems were published in 1941. He received an Atlantic Award for Literature in 1950 and traveled in France, Italy, and Sicily. During his travels he became interested in literature in Scots, his own native language, which shaped the direction of his work for the rest of his life.

He settled in Edinburgh and in 1953 married Heather Fretwell. He died on 6 June 1995 at the age of 77.

== Bibliography ==
- Seeven Poems o Maister Francis Villon: Made Oure intil Scots (1953) Tunbridge Wells: Pound Press.
- An Ode til New Jerusalem (1956) Edinburgh: M. Macdonald.
- A Possible Solution to the Scotch Problem (1963) Edinburgh: M. Macdonald.
- The Ship and Ither Poems (1963) London, New York: Oxford University Press.
- Dunbar: A Critical Exposition of the Poems (1966) Edinburgh, London: Oliver & Boyd.
- Editor with John MacQueen, The Oxford Book of Scottish Verse (1966) Oxford: Oxford University Press.
- Editor, Late Medieval Scots Poetry: A Selection from the Makars and Their Heirs down to 1610 (1967) London: Heinemann.
- At the Shrine o the Unkent Sodger: A Poem for Recitation (1968) Preston: Akros Publications.
- Tales of King Robert the Bruce: Freely Adapted from The Brus of John Barbour (1969) Edinburgh: Reprographia.
- Editor, The Penguin Book of Scottish Verse (1970) Harmondsworth, Penguin.
- (with Heather Scott) True Thomas the Rhymer and Other Tales of the Lowland Scots (1971) Oxford: Oxford University Press.
- Brand the Builder (1975) London: Ember Press.
- The Tree: An Animal Fable (1977) Dunfermline: Borderline Press.
- Tales of Sir William Wallace, Guardian of Scotland (1981) Edinburgh: G. Wright.
- The Collected Shorter Poems of Tom Scott (1993) Edinburgh: Chapman; London: Agenda.
