= Lallans (magazine) =

Scots language magazine

Lallans is a periodical subscription magazine in the Scots Language established by the Scots Language Society in 1973 and dedicated to the promotion and revived use of the language in literature and letters. The magazine publishes original prose and poetry, Scots translations, reviews of other books and materials also published in Scots, as well as articles, commentary and debate with relevance to the language. All of its content is written in Scots.

== Notable editors ==
The founding editor of Lallans was J.K. Annand who edited 20 issues of the magazine before stepping down in 1983. The playwright and poet Donald Campbell edited the Mairtinmas 1983 issue (Number 21). Others since include the Scots language poets William Neill (1922 - 2010) and David Purves (1924–2015), who was editor for 9 years between 1986 and 1995, Neil R. McCallum, John Law, Kenneth D. Farrow and William Hershaw.
