= David Purves =

Scottish Poet and Playwright

- Born: 9 April 1924; Selkirk, Scotland
- Died: 3 January 2015; Edinburgh, Scotland
- Occupation: Environmental Scientist
- Spouse: Lilian Rosemary Stewart
- Children: Graeme Alexander Stewart Purves, Jamie Scott Purves, David Neil Purves
- Writing career
- Language: Scots
- Notable work: The Puddok an the Princess (1985)
- Movement: Scots Language

Dr. David Purves (9 April 1924 – 3 January 2015) was a Scottish environmental scientist, playwright and poet, and a champion of the Scots language.

== Early life ==
Purves was born in Selkirk, Scotland, the only son of James Alexander Purves, a master grocer based in Galashiels, and his wife May Lees. He was brought up in the Borders, and educated at Galashiels Academy.

He served in the Royal Air Force in World War II, training as a bomber navigator in Canada.

== Career as an environmental scientist ==
After the war, he studied at the University of Edinburgh, gaining an honours degree and PhD in biochemistry. In 1956, he was appointed head of the Trace Element Department at the East of Scotland College of Agriculture, where he worked with the agricultural advisory service on trace element deficiency and toxicity problems. In 1977, his scientific monograph Trace-Element Contamination of the Environment, which highlighted the social and ecological implications of allowing metals to be dispersed into the biosphere as contaminants, was published by Elsevier. A revised edition was published in 1985. In 1980, he was commissioned by the United Nations Food and Agriculture Organisation to recommend standards for the disposal of sewage-sludge to land. He retired from the Edinburgh School of Agriculture in 1982, but maintained an interest in global environmental problems as Supervisor of its Central Analytical Department until 1987.

== Scottish National Party ==
Purves contested Roxburgh, Selkirk and Peebles as a Scottish National Party candidate in the parliamentary election in February 1974. He contributed a chapter on "Environmental Policy in an Independent Scotland" to The Radical Approach: Papers on an Independent Scotland, edited by Gavin Kennedy and published by Palingenesis Press Ltd. in 1976. He was later elected to the SNP's National Council and in the 1980s was convener of its Environment Policy Committee.

== Scots language ==
Purves was active in promoting the Scots language, taking a particular interest in the development of a standard orthography. In 1979, he contributed a paper on the spelling of Scots to The Scottish Literary Journal. In 1985, at Edinburgh University's School of Scottish Studies, he chaired a meeting of contemporary writers in Scots which agreed guidelines for Scots spelling. These were later published by the Scots Language Society as Recommendations for Writers in Scots. The Saltire Society published his book, A Scots Grammar, in 1997, and a revised and extended edition in 2002.c His paper The Way Forward for the Scots Language was published by the Scottish Centre for Economic and Social Research in 1997.

=== Poetry ===
His poems in Scots were published in a range of magazines, including AKROS, Lines Review, Cencrastus, Chapman, Lallans, Markings, Northwords and Reforesting Scotland. Two collections of his poems in Scots have been published: Thrawart Threipins in 1976, and Hert’s Bluid, Chapman 1995. His poems "On Mairriage" and "On Bairns" are included in the Scottish Poetry Library's anthologies, Handfast and Handsel respectively. His poems "Crabbit Angels" and "Cleikit" were published in The Edinburgh Book of Twentieth-Century Scottish Poetry published in 2005. His poems "Heid Bummers" (2006) and "Mirzah’s Brig" (2009) were included in The Smeddum Test, an anthology of 21st Century poems in Scots published by Kennedy & Boyd in 2013. His poems "Hard Wumman", "Resurrection" and "Brierie Law" were included in J. Derrick McClure's A Kist o Skinklan Things, an anthology of Scots poetry from the first and second waves of the Scottish Renaissance, published by the Association for Scottish Literary Studies in 2017.

Purves also rendered two hundred ancient Chinese poems in Scots, in four collections of fifty poems, entitled, Ane Auld Sang, Gean Blossoms, Jade Lute and Chrysants.

He was a member of the British Haiku Society.

=== Drama ===
Three of his plays in Scots, The Puddok an the Princess, The Knicht o the Riddils and Whuppitie Stourie, have been professionally produced. Other plays based on folk and fairy-tale themes are The Ill Guidmither, based on a tale collected by Peter Buchan in 1829, and Pompitie Finnds a Needle, a dramatisation of a children's story by Agnes Grozier Herbertson which was given a reading at Edinburgh Playwrights Workshop. The Puddok an the Princess marked the beginning of a long collaboration with Charles Nowosielski of Theatre Alba. The company's production of the play won a Fringe First Award at the Edinburgh Festival Fringe in 1985. It had a total of eight productions and was toured by Theatre Alba in 1986 and 1988. The Knicht o the Riddils was staged at the Brunton Theatre, Musselburgh, in November and December 1987. Whuppitie Stourie, based on a Scottish version of the fairytale Rumpelstiltskin, was toured by Theatre Alba between 30 October and 28 November 1989.

In an interview given to The Scotsman while The Knicht o the Riddils was playing in Musselburgh, Purves told Catherine Lockerbie that he was not trying to emulate the historical emphasis of admired Scots dramatists like Robert Maclellan. "I like to be free of the constraints of history," he said. "I prefer to go back into a fabulous period, to a world which never really existed but which has a reality of its own."

Purves also rendered works by other playwrights into Scots. His The Thrie Sisters. a translation of Three Sisters by Anton Chekhov, was produced by Theatre Alba at Lauriston Halls on the Edinburgh Festival Fringe in 1999. His The Tragedie o Macbeth, a translation and adaptation of William Shakespeare's Macbeth was published in 1992, given a reading by Edinburgh Playwrights Workshop in March of that year, and staged by Theatre Alba in Duddingston Kirk Gardens on the Festival Fringe in August 2002. The Ootlaw, a translation into Scots of August Strindberg's The Outlaw was staged by Theatre Alba at Duddingston Kirk on the 2009 Fringe. He also translated Eugene Schwartz's Little Red Riding Hood into Scots.

He was a member of the Scottish Society of Playwrights.

=== Lallans magazine ===
David Purves was elected as Preses of the Scots Language Society from 1983 to 1986 and served as editor of Lallans from 1987 to 1995. He was also co-editor with Neil R. MacCallum of Mak it New, an anthology of writing from the magazine, in 1995.

== Bibliography ==
- "Ane Ill Turn: an example of the Standard Scots orthography", in Annand, J.K. (ed.), Lallans, Number 2: Whitsunday 1974, p. 20, ISSN 1359-3587
- "The Spelling of Scots", in Annand, J.K. (ed.), Lallans, Number 4: Whitsunday 1975, pp. 26 – 28
- Trace-Element Contamination of the Environment, Elsevier, Amsterdam, 1977,ISBN 978-0444569660
- "Environmental Policy in an Independent Scotland", in Kennedy, Gavin (ed.) (1976), The Radical Approach: Papers on an independent Scotland, Palingenisis Press Ltd., Edinburgh, pp. 88–92, ISBN 0-905470-00-1
- Thrawart Threipins, The Aquila Publishing Co. Ltd., Breakish, Isle of Skye, 1976, ISBN 0-7275-0125-9
- "A Scots Orthography", in The Scottish Literary Journal, Supplement No. 9, Spring 1979
- "The Scots Language in Drama", Electric Scotland
- The Puddok an the Princess, Brown, Son & Ferguson Ltd., Glasgow, 1992, ISBN 0-85174-608-X
- The Tragedie o Macbeth: A Rendering into Scots of Shakespeare's Play, Rob Roy Press, 1992, ISBN 1858320003
- "The Tragedie o Macbeth", in MacCallum, Neil R. (ed.), Scots Glasnost, VII, April 1993, Scots Independent (Newspapers) Ltd., pp. 9 – 11, ISSN 0966-9639
- J.K. Annand: A Makar tae Mynd, Obituary, in Renton, Jennie (ed.), Scottish Book Collector, Volume 3, Number 12, August - September 1993, Edinburgh, p. 33
- "The Lest o the Ettins", in Bryan, Tom (ed.), Northwords Issue 6, Ross and Cromarty Association of Writers' Groups, p. 19, ISSN 0964-6876
- Hert's Bluid, Chapman Publications, Edinburgh, 1995, ISBN 0-906772-70-2
- with Neil R. MacCallum, Mak it New: An Anthology of Twenty-one Years of Writing in Lallans, The Mercat Press, Edinburgh, 1995, ISBN 9-781873-644461
- The Way Forward for the Scots Language, Scottish Council for Economic and Social Research, Peterhead
- A Scots Grammar: Scots Grammar and Usage, The Saltire Society, Edinburgh, 2002, ISBN 0-85411-079-8
- "The Language of Scots", in Clark, Nick (ed.), Poetic Hours, Autumn 2004, Nottingham, p. 9, ISSN 1367-8760
- "Haiku & Zen Buddhism", in Glen, Duncan (ed.), Scottish Poetry Library Newsletter, January 2005, Scottish Poetry Library, Edinburgh, p. 5, ISSN 0960-0477
- "Polishing the Glass: Japanese Masters in Scots", in Clark, Nick (ed.), Poetic Hours, Spring 2005, Nottingham, pp. 8 & 9, ISSN 1367-8760
- "in ilka age: The Poetry of Li Po", in Clark, Nick (ed.), Poetic Hours, Autumn 2005, Nottingham, pp. 4 & 5, ISSN 1367-8760
- "From the Chinese of Ssü-K'ung T'u", in Hendry, Joy (ed.), Chapman 109, 2007

== Personal life ==
David Purves married Lilian Rosemary Stewart, a primary school teacher, at Cramond Parish Kirk, Edinburgh, on 19 September 1953. The couple had met at university. They spent the first four years of their married life in Stow, in the Borders. In 1957 they returned to Edinburgh, living first in Meadowfield Terrace, and then in Hillpark Avenue, Cluny Gardens, and Strathalmond Road. The couple had three sons: Graeme Alexander Stewart (b. 1954), Jamie Scott (b. 1958), and David Neil (b. 1964).
