= Helen Stratton =

British illustrator known for children's books (1867–1961)

- Born: Helen Isobel Mansfield Ramsey Stratton; 5 April 1867; Nowganj, India
- Died: 4 June 1961 (aged 94); Bath, United Kingdom
- Known for: Illustration
- Movement: Art Nouveau

Helen Isobel Mansfield Ramsey Stratton (5 April 1867 – 4 June 1961) was a British artist and book illustrator.

== Biography ==
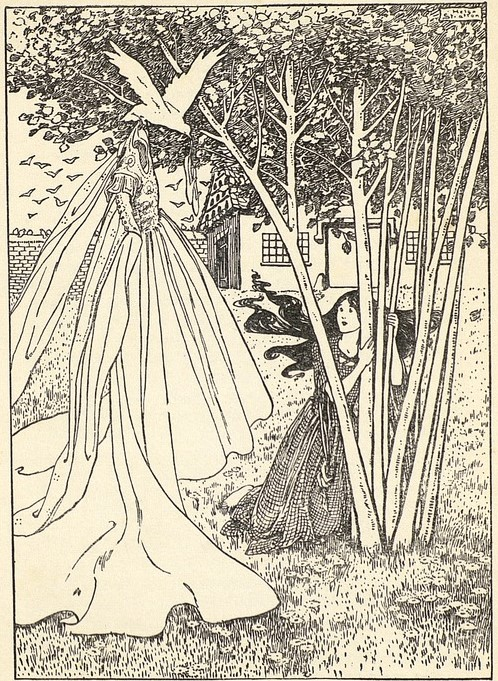
Illustration from Cinderella (1903)

Stratton was born in Nowganj, Bundelkhand, Madhya Pradesh, India on 5 April 1867, the daughter of a surgeon in the Indian military service John Proudfoot Stratton and Georgina Anne Anderson. Soon after Helen's birth, and following her father's retirement, the family moved to England, settling in Bath. By 1891 Helen was in Kensington, London to attend art school, where she became a follower of Art Nouveau in the style of the Glasgow School of Art. For many years she lived and worked as a book illustrator and painter in Kensington with her widowed mother and siblings. Stratton remained unmarried and in the 1930s she returned to Bath, living at The Bungalow, Widcombe Hill. She died on 4 June 1961, age 95, at Cran Hill Nursing Home, Weston.

== Illustration career ==
From 1896, Stratton became well known for bold and imaginative pen and ink illustrations to classic tales. Her first success was illustrating Norman Gale's Songs for Little People, of which The Bookseller wrote in 1896 "Miss Stratton has headed, tailed and bordered the verses with a series of exquisitely pictured fancies". In 1898, she drew 167 illustrations for Walter Douglas Campbell's Beyond the Border. A year later, she reached the peak of her illustration career with upwards of four hundred drawings for a finely crafted art nouveau quarto edition of The Fairy Tales of Hans Christian Andersen, published by George Newnes. In the same year, she collaborated with William Heath Robinson and three other illustrators (A D McCormick, A L Davis and A E Norbury) to create hundreds of illustrations for The Arabian Nights Entertainments, initially published in sections, then later in a large quarto edition. Although initially noted for her black and white illustrations, she also illustrated in watercolour for works such as H.C. Herbertson's Heroic Legends (1908) and Jean Lang's A Book of Myths (1915). Her work for The Princess and the Goblin by George MacDonald and its sequel The Princess and Curdie (1912) were particularly popular and have been frequently reprinted.

== Example works ==
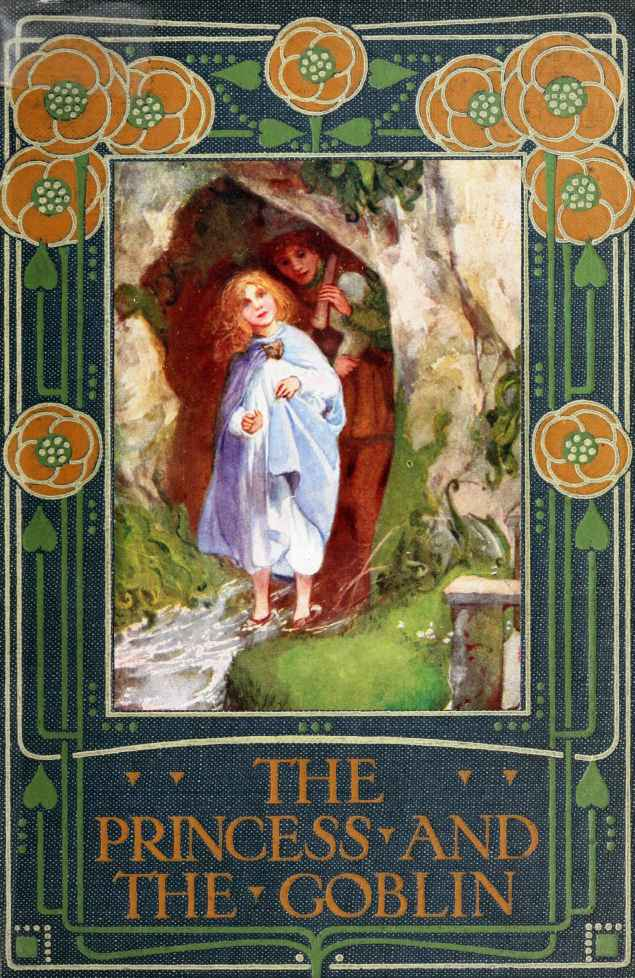
Cover of the book Princess and the Goblin

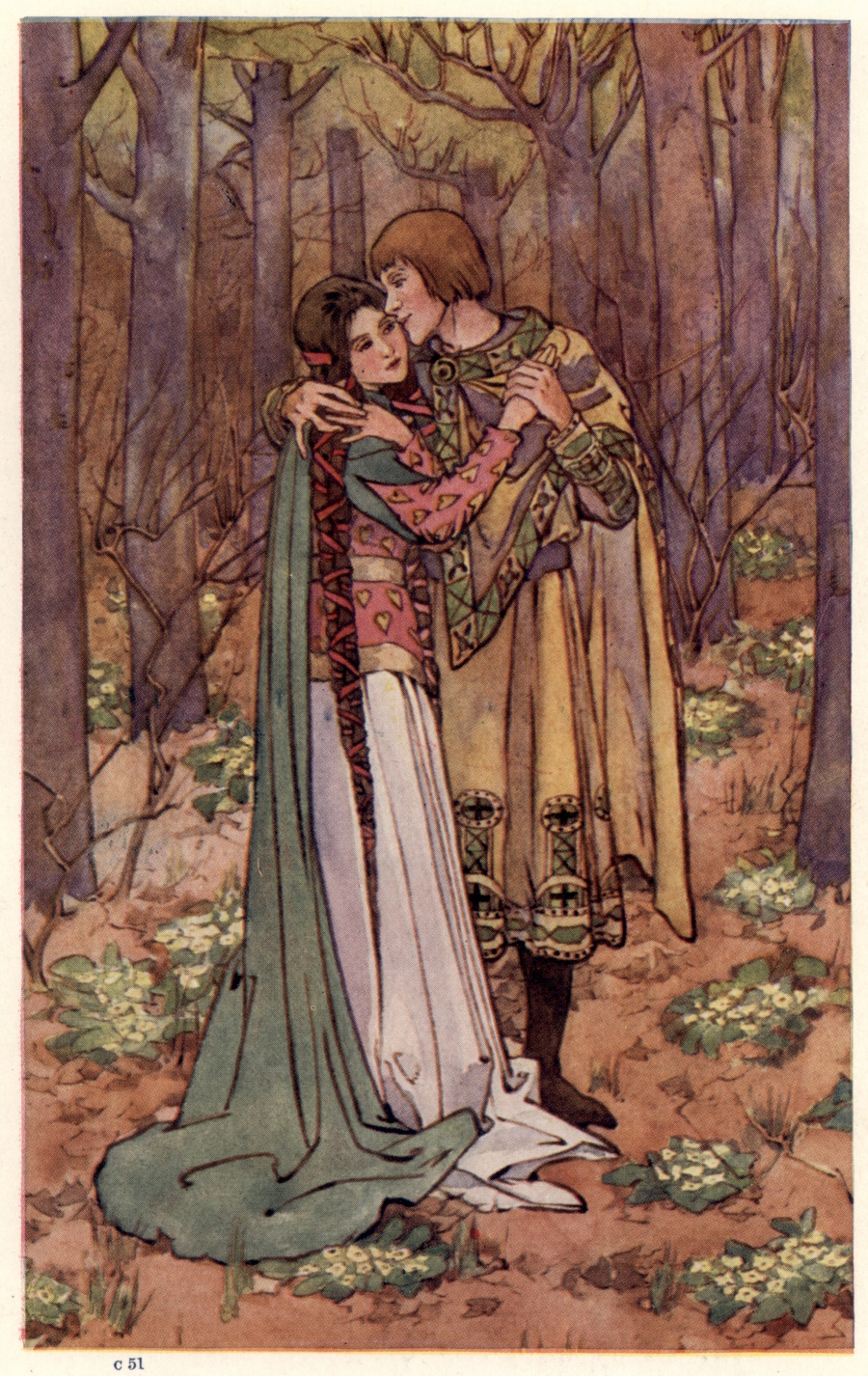
from King Arthur and His Knights

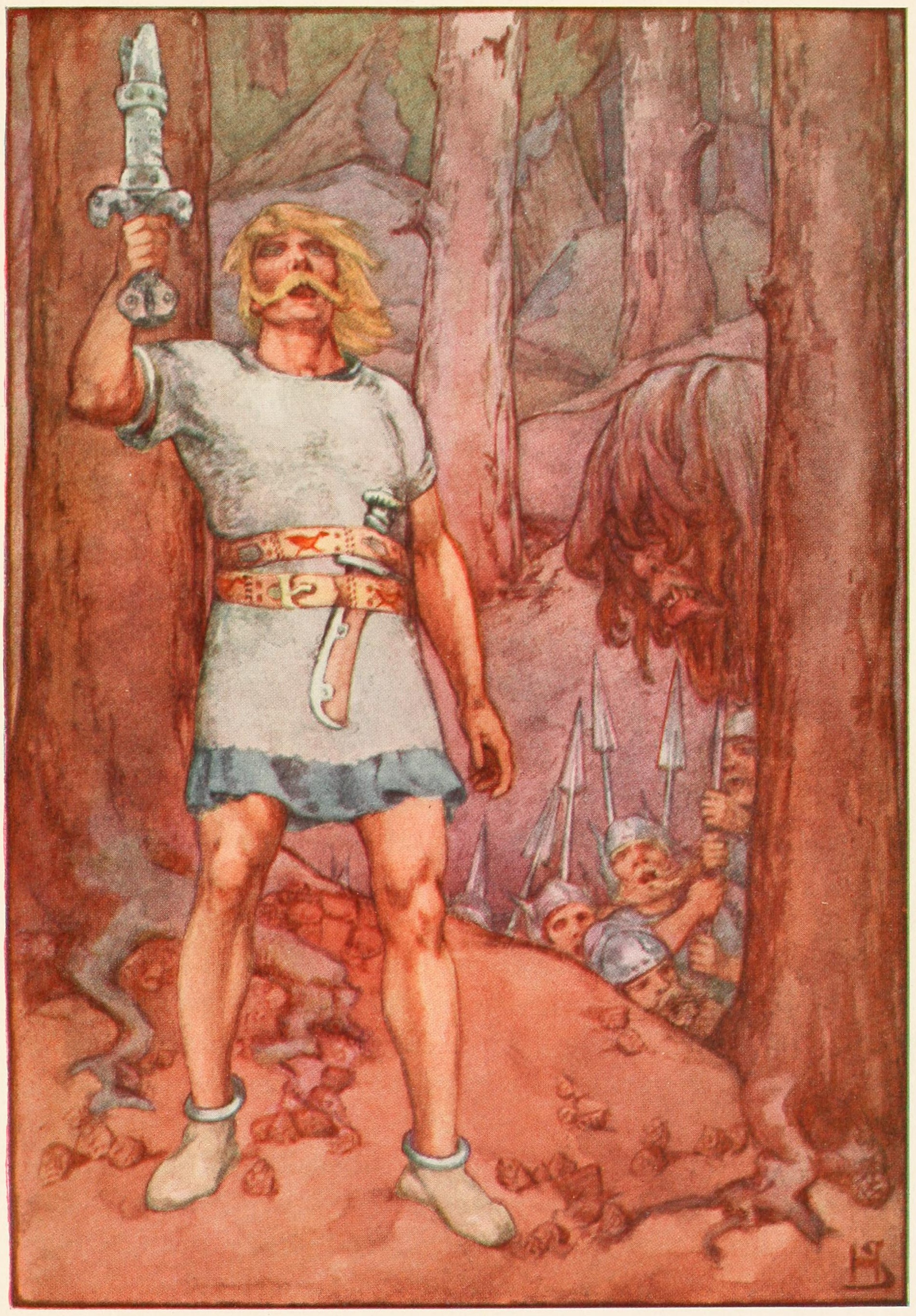
Beowulf, from A Book of Myths

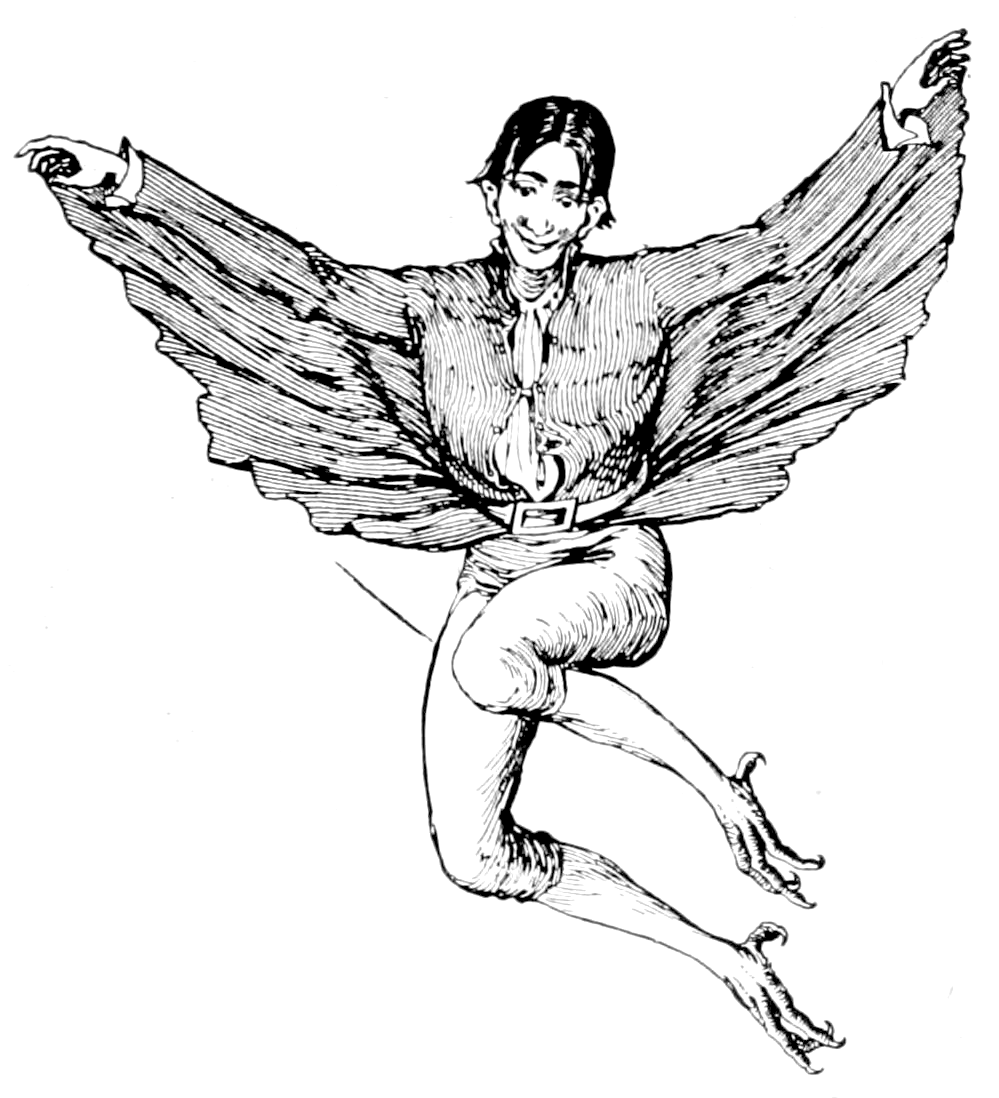
from The Goloshes of Happiness by Hans Christian Anderson

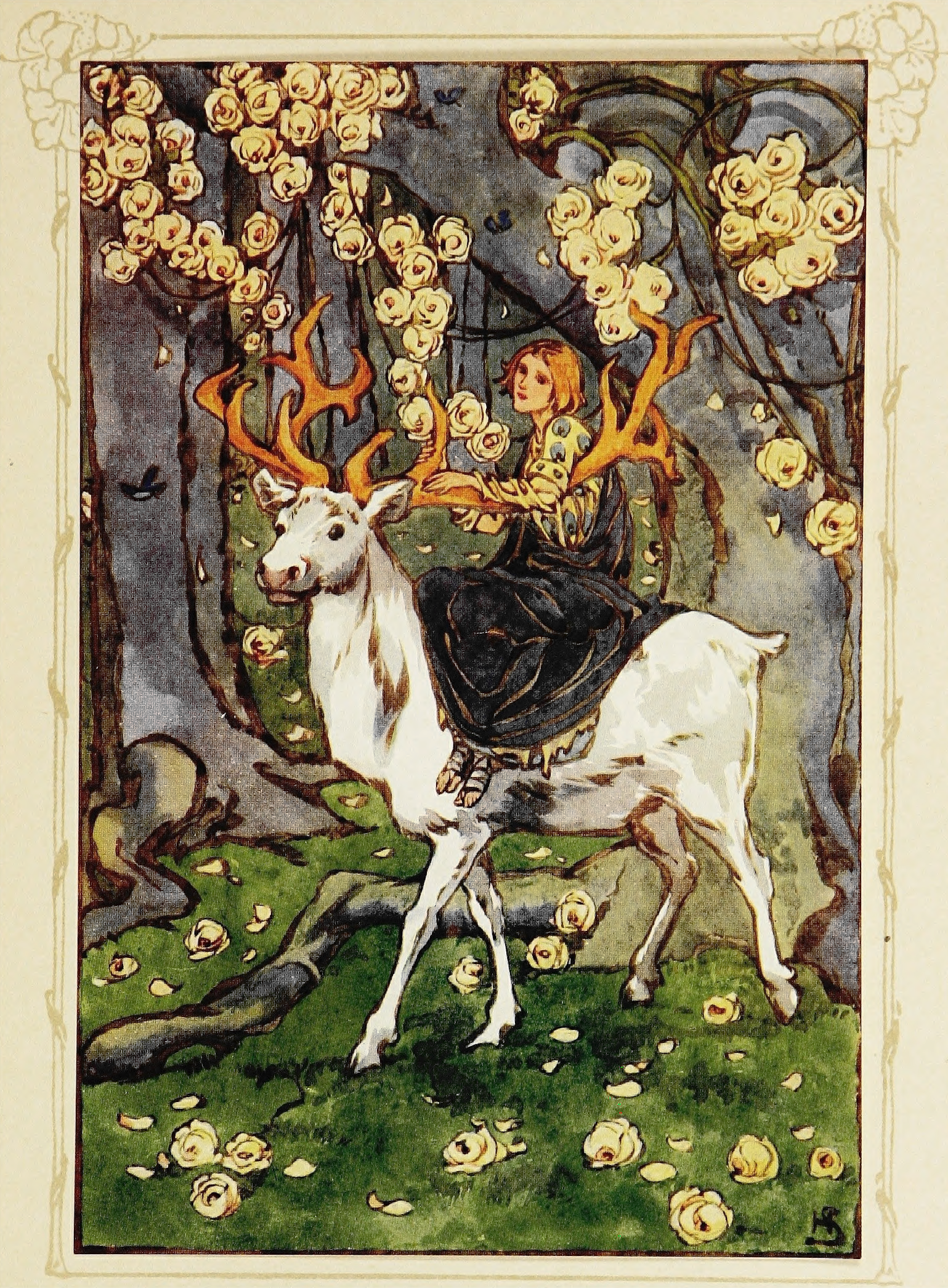
from The Lily of Life

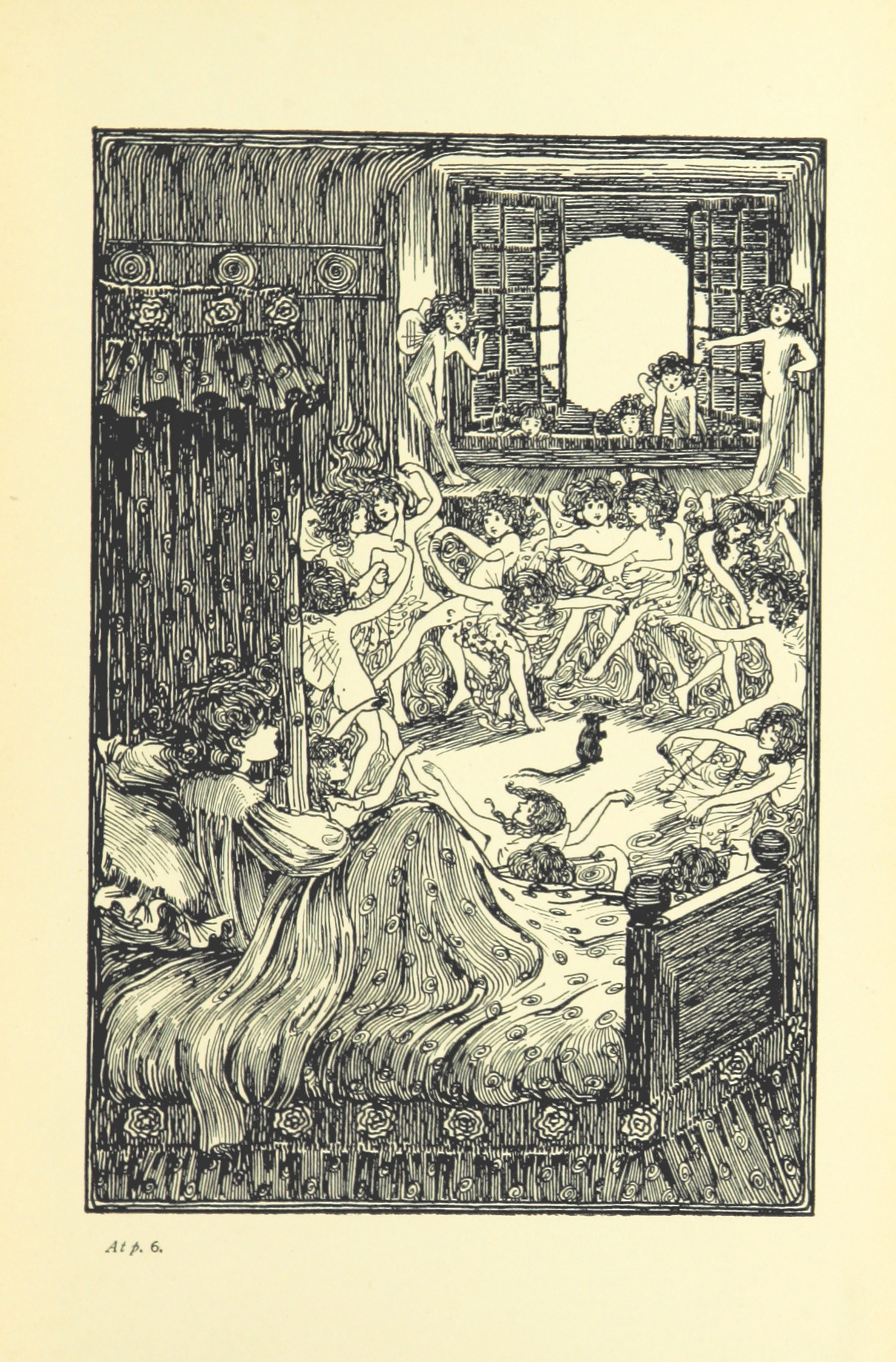
from Songs for Little People

== Books illustrated ==
- Norman Rowland Gale - Songs For Little People 8 B/W plates, B/W drawings throughout (Constable, 1896)
- Hans Christian Andersen – Tales From Hans Andersen (Constable, 1896)
- Walter Douglas Campbell - Beyond The Border 167 B/W drawings (Constable, 1898)
- Hans Christian Andersen – The Fairy Tales of Hans Christian Andersen circa 400 B/W illustrations by Lemercier and Helen Stratton (who gets sole credit on the title page) (George Newnes, 1899)
- Anonymous - The Arabian Nights Entertainments (contributor) (George Newnes, 1899)
- George Laurence Gomme – The Princess's Story Book 23 B/W drawings (Constable, 1901)
- Various – Fairy Tales for Little Folk (Blackie, 1902)
- Various – Long, Long Ago: A Picture Book of Nursery Tales (Blackie, 1902)
- Thomas Malory – Selections From Le Morte D’Arthur (Edited by C. L. Thomson) (Marshall, 1902)
- Clara Linklater Thomson – Tales From The Greek (Marshall, 1902)
- Brothers Grimm – Grimm’s Fairy Tales (1903)
- Charles Lamb – Shakespeare For Young People (The Tempest) (Alexander Moring, 1904)
- Hans Christian Andersen – Hans Andersen's Fairy Tales 16 colour plates, numerous B/W (Blackie, 1905)
- Gladys Davidson (selected and retold for children by) – The Arabian Nights' Entertainments (Blackie, 1906)
- Bessie Marchant – A Daughter of the Ranges (Blackie, 1906)
- Agnes Grozier Herbertson – Heroic Legends 16 colour plates (Blackie, 1908)
- Brothers Grimm – Cherry Blossom and Other Stories from Grimm 16 colour plates, 39 B/W (Blackie, 1908)
- John Bunyan (retold by Agnes Grozier) – The Pilgrim’s Progress (Blackie, 1909)
- Gladys Davidson (selected and retold for children by) – The Arabian Nights' Entertainments (Blackie, 1909; extended ed. of the 1906 ed.)
- Eliza F. Pollard – A Saxon Maid colour frontispiece, B/W text drawings (Blackie, 1909)
- Jessie Mabel Dearmer – The Playmate: A Christmas Mystery (Mowbray, 1910)
- George MacDonald – The Princess and The Goblin (Blackie, 1911)
- George MacDonald – The Princess and Curdie 12 colour plates, 29 B/W (Blackie, 1912)
- Crown Princess of Roumania, The Lily of Life, A Fairy Tale, preface by Sylvia Carmen, 18 colour plates (Hodder, 1913)
- Ethel Carnie – The Lamp Girl and Other Stories (Headley Bros, 1913)
- Jean Lang – A Book of Myths 20 colour plates (T.C. & E.C. Jack, 1915)
- Eleanor Cecilia Barnes – As The Water Flows: A Record of Adventures in a Canoe on The Rivers and Trout Streams of Southern England 36 colour plates, B/W drawings and initials throughout (Grant Richards, 1920)
- Brothers Grimm – Stories From Grimm (Blackie, 1921)
- Henry Lawrence Somers Cocks – The Mystery of Malvern Mire colour frontispiece, B/W text drawings (Wilson & Phillips, 1924)
- Enid Leale – Tony’s Desert Island (Nelson, 1929)
- Christine Chaundler – Ronald’s Burglar colour frontispiece, B/W throughout (Nelson, 1934)
- Constance Savery – Nicolas Chooses White May (Nelson, 1930)
