= Theatre Alba =

Scottish theatre company

Theatre Alba logo (1986)

Theatre Alba was a Scottish theatre company founded in 1981 by Charles Nowosielski and Richard Cherns, with the aim of promoting diversity in Scottish theatre. With nearly 70 productions over four decades, it promoted new Scottish plays by Scottish authors incorporating Scottish traditional music, staged plays in the Scots language and encouraged new Scottish writing. Some of its most successful productions were works which drew on folklore or fairytale.

== Early Years ==
The company's first production was Edward Stiven's Tamlane, staged in the open air on the Calton Hill, Edinburgh, in 1981. It then moved to The Astoria, a former dance hall in Abbeymount, where it presented Outside the Jeweller's Shop by Karol Wojtyla, The Passion, Part One by Bill Bryden, Swanwhite by August Strindberg, and the world premiere of The Shepherd Beguiled by Netta. B. Reid. Programmed to run until 28 February 1982, the production was extended until 6 March by popular demand. It was revived at the Braidburn Park open-air theatre for the Edinburgh Festival Fringe in August, and subsequently staged at the Traverse Theatre from 28 September to 2 October.

== Expansion and Key Milestones ==
Theatre Alba's production of The Puddok an the Princess by David Purves won a Fringe First Award in August 1985, was staged again at the Traverse Theatre in December, and was taken on national tours by the company in 1986 and 1988. After he was appointed Artistic Director at the Brunton Theatre, Musselburgh, in 1986, Nowosielski continued to direct Theatre Alba productions at the Assembly Rooms on the Edinburgh Fringe. The company toured Edward Stiven's Tamlane in the Borders during the Borders Festival of Ballads and Legends in the autumn of 1987. Stiven's The Cauldron was taken on tour in the spring of 1988. David Purves' Whuppitie Stourie was taken on a tour of the Central Belt in the autumn of 1989. Robert McLellan's The Carlin Moth was staged at Theatre Workshop at the Edinburgh Festival Fringe in August 1990 and toured South-West Scotland in the Autumn.

During the 1990s, Theatre Alba, basing itself in Edinburgh's Netherbow Theatre, staged several new Scottish plays including Wallace's Women, Thenew and Josef, as well as adaptations of Chekov and Shakespeare classics, and reworkings of the Scots language favourites it had become known for, like The Shepherd Beguiled.

== Move to Duddingston ==
In 1998, the company was invited to present its Festival Fringe productions outdoors in Duddingston Kirk Manse Gardens, on the banks of Duddingston Loch. Its first production at the site was a revival of Netta B. Reid’s A Shepherd Beguiled, and the gardens continued to serve as an August venue for more than twenty years. Although exposed to the unpredictability of the Scottish summer weather, the outdoor setting proved well suited to promenade and immersive sunset performances, aligning closely with the faerie and folklore themes for which the company had become known.

From 2002, Theatre Alba expanded its Fringe programme to include regular children’s theatre. Under the direction of Clunie Mackenzie and Keith Hutcheon the company developed a series of promenade productions performed in Dr Neil's garden. Mackenzie wrote and directed most of these plays, including Baba Yaga and the Girl with the Kind Heart, The Magic Quest, Quest for Excalibur (which was listed as one of the Guardian's 21 unmissable shows for Children and Families 2016) and The Garden o’ Delight (which received the Primary Times Children’s Choice Award in the 2018). This period further cemented a long-running musical collaboration with composer John Sampson. Theatre Alba’s children’s theatre programme continued until 2021.

Between 2003 until 2018, the company also mounted four quinquennial Passion Plays, which were large scale productions performed on Easter Sundays at locations around Duddingston village.

== Closure ==
Theatre Alba ceased regular operations following its 2018 season. Founder and artistic director Charles Nowosielski died on 5 May 2020. The company was revived briefly in 2021 with a restaging of The Garden o' Delight at Dr Neil's Garden, adhering to COVID-19 restrictions. Clunie Mackenzie died in December 2025.

== Productions ==
- 1981: Tamlane, by Edwin Stiven
- 1981: Outside The Jeweller's Shop by Karol Wojtyla
- 1981: The Passion, Part One, by Bill Bryden
- 1981: Swanwhite, by August Strinberg
- 1982: The Shepherd Beguiled, by Netta B. Reid
- 1984: Rhymer's Promise by Donald Gunn
- 1985: The Shepherd Beguiled, by Netta B. Reid
- 1985: The Puddok an the Princess, by David Purves
- 1986: The Puddok an the Princess, by David Purves
- 1986: The Lass wi' the Muckle Mou, by Alexander Reid
- 1987: The Warld's Wonder, by Alexander Reid
- 1987: Tamlane, by Edwin Stiven
- 1988: The Cauldron by Edward Stiven
- 1988: The Puddok an the Princess, by David Purves
- 1989: Whuppitie Stourie by David Purves
- 1990: The Time Gairden, by David Swan
- 1990: The Carlin Moth, by Robert McLellan
- 1998: The Shepherd Beguiled, by Netta B. Reid
- 1998: Wallace's Women, by Margaret McSeveney and Elizabeth Roberts
- 1998: Good Morning Mr. Burns, by Donald Mackenzie
- 1999: Shakespeare at the Sheraton
- 1999: The Thrie Sisters, by Anton Chekov, translated into Scots by David Purves
- 1999: Tamlane, by Edwin Stiven
- 2000: Josef, by Raymond Ross
- 2000: Charles Edward Stuart - a Prince without a realm, based on the writings of Donald Mackenzie
- 2001: Thenew, by Margaret McSeveney
- 2001: The Wallace by Sidney Goodsir Smith
- 2002: The Tragedie o MacBeth, by William Shakespeare, translated into Scots by David Purves
- 2002: The Faery Queen, by Howard Purdie
- 2002: The Carlin Moth, by Robert McLellan
- 2003: The Burning, by Stewart Conn
- 2003: The Enchauntit Gairden, by Charles Mackenzie
- 2004: The Magic Quest, by Clunie Mackenzie
- 2004: A Midsummer Night's Dream, by William Shakespeare
- 2004: Stories by the Lochside by David Campbell, Donald Smith, Linda Bandelier and James Jack
- 2005: The Taming of the Shrew, by William Shakespeare
- 2006: The Death of Arthur, by Donald Smith
- 2006: The Quest for Excalibur, by Clunie Mackenzie
- 2006: The Tempest, by William Shakespeare
- 2007: Mary Rose by J.M Barrie
- 2008: Little Red Riding Hood, by Eugene Schwartz
- 2008: Saint Joan, by George Bernard Shaw
- 2009: The Fairy Queen, by Howard Purdie
- 2009: A Man for All Seasons, by Robert Bolt
- 2009: The Ootlaw, by August Strindberg, translated into Scots by David Purves
- 2010: The Seagull, by Anton Chekov, adapted by Jo Clifford
- 2011: The Cherry Orchard, by Anton Chekov, adapted by Jo Clifford
- 2012: Dancing at Lughnasa, by Brian Friel
- 2012: Fair Brown and Trembling
- 2012: Bedtime Story, A Pound on Demand by Seán O'Casey
- 2012: Words Upon the Window Pane by William Butler Yeats'
- 2012: Riders to the Sea by John Millington Synge
- 2013: To The Cross - Easter Play - base on the Gospels and poetry of Michael Justin Davis
- 2013: The Diary of Anne Frank, by Frances Goodrich and Albert Hackett
- 2013: The Garden o' Delight, by Clunie Mackenzie
- 2014: Mary Stewart by Robert McLellan
- 2014: Something in it for Cordelia by Joan Ure
- 2014: Something in it for Ophelia by Joan Ure
- 2014: The Magic Quest by Clunie Mackenzie
- 2015: Baba Yaga And The Girl With The Kind Heart - by Clunie Mackenzie
- 2015: Smoking is Bad for You by Anton Checkov
- 2015: Something Unspoken by Tennessee Williams
- 2015: The Good Doctor by Neil Simon
- 2016: The Quest for Excalibur, by Clunie Mackenzie
- 2016: The Shepherd Beguiled, by Netta B. Reid
- 2017: Cinders: A Folk tale by Clunie Mackenzie
- 2017: Three Wee Kings: Grandad’s Cut by Paul Morris adapted by Charles Nowosielski
- 2018: The Garden o' Delight by Clunie Mackenzie
