= Charles Nowosielski =

Scottish theatre director

- Born: 21 July 1953; Edinburgh, Scotland
- Died: 5 May 2020; Edinburgh, Scotland
- Occupation: theatre director
- Spouses: Sharon Erskine, Anne Lannan
- Children: Stefan, Ana

Charles Nowosielski (21 July 1953 – 5 May 2020) was a Scottish theatre director and founder of the theatre company Theatre Alba.

== Early life ==
Nowosielski was born in Edinburgh to a Polish father (Wlodzimierz, known as Wlodek) and Scottish mother (Grace). He was the youngest of four children. He attended St. Peter's Roman Catholic Primary School and George Heriot's School, where he was captain of the school's 1st 15 rugby team.

He studied at the London Academy of Music and Dramatic Art, graduating in 1975, and performed in plays in London, Scotland and overseas until the late 1970s. He gained his first experience as a director while working at Dundee Rep, where he was asked to direct a series of short plays, including Joan Ure’s Something in it for Cordelia.

== Theatre Alba ==
In 1981, with Richard Cherns, he founded Theatre Alba, with the aim of promoting diversity in Scottish theatre by producing plays in the Scots language and encouraging new Scottish writing. He took the role of artistic director while Cherns became the company's musical director.

The company's first production was Edward Stiven's Tamlane, staged in the open air on the Calton Hill, Edinburgh, in 1981. In 1982 it staged the world premiere of The Shepherd Beguiled by Netta. B. Reid. The company's production of The Puddok an the Princess by David Purves won a Fringe First Award in August 1985, was staged again at the Traverse Theatre in December, and was taken on national tours by the company in 1986 and 1988. The company toured Edward Stiven's Tamlane in the Borders during the Borders Festival of Ballads and Legends in the auntumn of 1987. Stiven's The Cauldron was taken on tour in the spring of 1988. David Purves' Whuppitie Stourie was taken on a tour of the Central Belt in the autumn of 1989. Robert McLellan's The Carlin Moth was staged at Theatre Workshop on the Edinburgh Festival Fringe in August 1990 and toured South-West Scotland in the Autumn.

In 1998, the company was invited to mount its Festival Fringe productions in Duddingston Kirk Gardens. Its first production there was a revival of Netta B. Reid's A Shepherd Beguiled, and it continued to use the gardens as an August venue for more than twenty years. Among the productions staged by the company during this period were adaptations of Anton Chekov's The Seagull and The Cherry Orchard commissioned from Jo Clifford and a Scots translations of Chekov's The Three Sisters and August Strindberg's The Outlaw commissioned from David Purves. From 2003 until 2018, Nowosielski produced four quinquennial Passion Plays, which were performed on Easter Sundays at locations around Duddingston village.

== Brunton Theatre ==
Nowosielski was appointed artistic director at the Brunton Theatre, Musselburgh, in 1986, Richard Cherns joining him as musical director. Notable productions under their direction included the Kander & Ebb musical Cabaret, with Alan Cumming in the role of Cliff Bradshaw (1987), and Goodrich and Hackett'sThe Diary of Anne Frank (1988), The Brunton Theatre Company staged two Edinburgh International Festival productions, James Bridie's Holy Isle, opening at the Church Hill Theatre in Edinburgh, with Vivien Heilbron in the role of Margause, Queen of Orkney (1988), and Robert Silver's The Bruce (1991).

Nowosielski continued to direct Theatre Alba productions at the Assembly Rooms on the Edinburgh Fringe, and took several of them on tour.

== Lyric Theatre ==
Between 1991 and 1993, Nowosielski was artistic director at the Lyric Theatre in Belfast. He directed the Lyric Players in productions of Daphne Du Maurier's Rebecca, with Orla Brady in the title role, in January/February 1992, George Bernard Shaw's Arms and the Man in October 1992. and Willy Russell's Stags and Hens in October 1993.

== MPR Theatre Studio ==
Nowosielski returned to Scotland in 1993, establishing the MPR Theatre Studio in Musselburgh, where he lived with his wife, the late Scottish actress Anne Lannan, and daughter Ana for some time before moving to Haddington. MPR provided drama classes for children and later became an arm of Theatre Alba for amateur players.

== Productions ==
- 1979?: Something in it for Cordelia by Joan Ure
- 1981: Tamlane, by Edwin Stiven
- 1981: The Jeweller's Shop by Karol Wojtyla
- 1981: The Passion, Part One, by Bill Bryden
- 1981: Swanwhite, by August Strindberg
- 1982: The Shepherd Beguiled, by Netta B. Reid
- 1985: The Shepherd Beguiled, by Netta B. Reid
- 1985: The Puddok an the Princess, by David Purves
- 1986: The Puddok an the Princess, by David Purves
- 1986: The Lass wi' the Muckle Mou, by Alexander Reid
- 1986: Oh, What a Lovely War! by Joan Littlewood
- 1987: The Warld's Wonder, by Alexander Reid
- 1987: Tamlane, by Edwin Stiven
- 1988: The Cauldron by Edward Stiven
- 1988: The Puddok an the Princess, by David Purves
- Holy Isle by James Bridie
- 1989: Whuppitie Stourie by David Purves
- 1990: The Time Gairden, by David Swan
- 1990: The Carlin Moth, by Robert McLellan
- 1991: The Bruce by Robert Silver
- 1992: Rebecca, by Daphne Du Maurier
- 1992: Arms and the Man, by George Bernard Shaw
- 1993: Stags and Hens, by Willy Russell
- 1998: The Shepherd Beguiled, by Netta B. Reid
- 1998: Wallace's Women by Margaret McSeveney and Elizabeth Roberts
- 1998: Good Morning Mr. Burns, by Donald Mackenzie
- 1999: Shakespeare at the Sheraton
- 1999: The Thrie Sisters, play by Anton Chekhov, translated into Scots by David Purves
- 1999: Tamlane, by Edwin Stiven
- 2000: Josef, by Raymond Ross
- 2001: Thenew, by Margaret McSeveney
- 2002: The Tragedie o MacBeth, by William Shakespeare, translated into Scots by David Purves
- 2002: The Faery Queen, by Howard Purdie
- 2002: The Carlin Moth, by Robert McLellan
- 2003: The Burning, by Stewart Conn
- 2003: The Enchauntit Gairden, by Charles Mackenzie
- 2004: The Magic Quest, by Clunie Mackenzie
- 2004: A Midsummer Night's Dream, by William Shakespeare
- 2008: Little Red Riding Hood, by Eugene Schwartz
- 2008: Saint Joan, by George Bernard Shaw
- 2009: The Fairy Queen, by Howard Purdie
- 2009: A Man for All Seasons, by Robert Bolt
- 2009: The Ootlaw, by August Strindberg, translated into Scots by David Purves
- 2010: The Seagull, by Anton Chekov, adapted by Jo Clifford
- 2011: The Cherry Orchard, by Anton Chekov, adapted by Jo Clifford
- 2012: Dancing at Lughnasa, by Brian Friel
- 2013: The Diary of Anne Frank, by Frances Goodrich and Albert Hackett
- 2013: The Garden o' Delight, by Clunie Mackenzie
- 2016: The Quest for Excalibur, by Clunie Mackenzie
- 2016: The Shepherd Beguiled, by Netta B. Reid
