= Matthew McDiarmid =

Scottish literary scholar and essayist

Matthew Purdie McDiarmid (25 June 1914 – 12 February 1996) was a Scottish literary scholar, essayist, campaigning academic and poet. He was a founding member of the Association for Scottish Literary Studies (1970) and the first president of the Robert Henryson Society which he also helped to found in 1993.

== Career ==
McDiarmid was one of the leading members of a pioneering generation of Scottish academics who laboured and campaigned for a proper place for Scotland's literature in Scottish universities. At the opening of his career, no Scottish university had a dedicated professor of Scottish literature; by the time of his death, there were six.

McDiarmid was born in Barrhead in the West of Scotland and educated at the University of Glasgow and Balliol College, Oxford. His teaching career began with a post as assistant lecturer in English at the University of Aberdeen in 1939. This was interrupted in 1941 for military service in World War II as a cryptographer in North Africa and was resumed in Aberdeen in 1945.

For twelve years (1952–1964), McDiarmid lectured at Queen's University, Belfast. His teaching of literature, with its sensitivity to writers and traditions from all parts of the British Isles, was an important influence on the future Nobel Prize–winning poet Seamus Heaney, one of his students during that period. He returned to Aberdeen University in 1964 where he remained until retirement in 1982.

== Works ==
McDiarmid edited major canonical texts for the Scottish Text Society: the works of Robert Fergusson (two volumes, 1954–1956) and Hary's Wallace (two volumes, 1968–1969), as well as producing the general introduction and full literary and historical notes for what is now the principal modern edition of Barbour's Bruce (three volumes, 1980–1985). He also produced a version of Sir David Lindsay's Satire of the Three Estates (1967) and wrote commentaries on the Scottish makars, in particular Robert Henryson. Audio recordings of appraisals of medieval Scottish literature he made for the Scotsoun archive also exist.

In the years of his retirement, Matthew McDiarmid produced two volumes of verse, Not in my Own Land (1984) and Love Tales of Early Japan and Early Scotland, and Other Poems (1991).

== See also ==
- Alexander Scott (20th century poet)
- David Daiches
- Douglas Gifford
