= Brunton Theatre =

Performing arts venue in Musselburgh, East Lothian, Scotland

Coordinates: 55.9439°N 3.0570°W

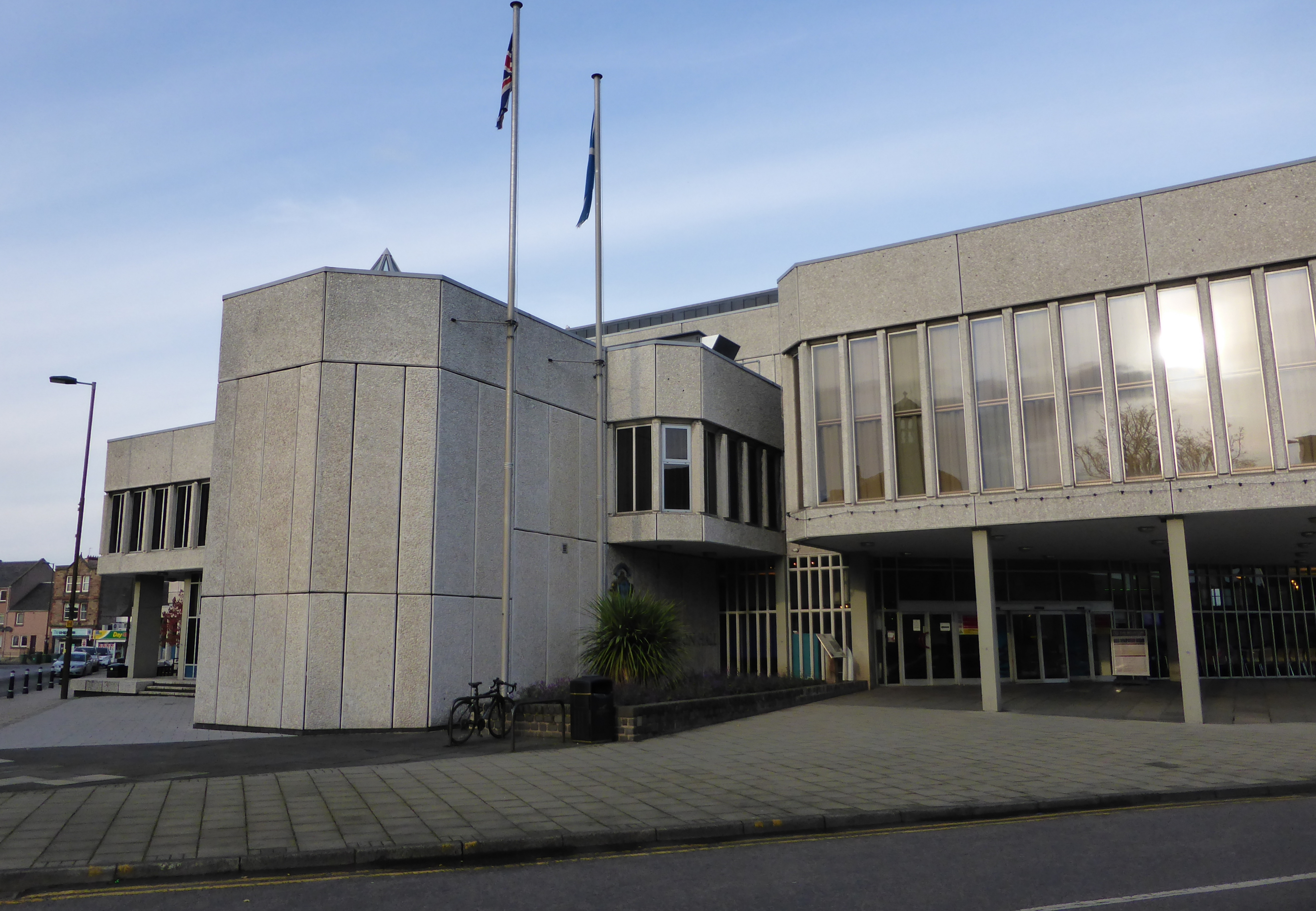
Brunton Theatre, Musselburgh

The Brunton Theatre is a building in Musselburgh, East Lothian, Scotland that was a mid-scale performing arts venue 1971–2023. It is part of a wider complex, incorporating council offices, called Brunton Memorial Hall.

The building is textured concrete and glass, and was designed by William Kininmonth, with a gilded relief sculpture by the Scottish sculptor Thomas Whalen on the facade.

== History ==
The name derives from John D. Brunton, son of John Brunton, the founder of the Brunton Wireworks. He died in 1951 and left a bequest of £700,000 to the people of Musselburgh for the purpose of creating a community hall. The town council supplemented this and created a larger scheme which incorporated their offices. Queen Elizabeth the Queen Mother led the official opening on 23 June 1971.

The building had two main performance spaces: a 300 capacity theatre, with notably clear sightlines, and a main hall upstairs, which seated 500. The main hall (also known as "Venue 1") was used to host classical music concerts, comedy and contemporary dance performances, as well as regular cinema screenings and live screenings from the National Theatre and Royal Opera House.

The theatre underwent refurbishment in the late 1990s, while the entire building was refurbished in 2010-11 for £3.2 million.

In 2023, part of the theatre was "zoned off" because of the presence of reinforced autoclaved aerated concrete (RAAC) in the roof panelling. In October 2024, East Lothian Council voted unanimously to close the building and to consult on its demolition after consultants said that repairing it would be "untenable".

Historic Environment Scotland received a proposal to list the Brunton Hall Civic Centre complex, including the theatre, in October 2024. The assessment stated that it met the criteria to be listed at category B for special architectural or historic interest. Local politicians published a letter against the listing proposal. In November 2025 it was determined that the building complex would not be listed as development plans were too advanced.

In July 2026, it was announced that the remaining council departments that occupy the building were to move to new premises on 27 August, after which the building would close completely.

== Productions ==
In the early years, the theatre was used mainly for pantomime and productions by local amateur groups, with occasional performances by touring companies. In 1979, East Lothian District Council asked Sandy Neilson to form a company to present an eight-week season of drama, and he was a successful director at the Brunton in the early 1980s. The three plays produced during the first season were Frederick Knott's thriller Wait Until Dark, Alexander Reid's Scots comedy The Lass wi' the Muckle Mou, and Peter Nichols' A Day in the Death of Joe Egg, with John Bett in the title role. Ron Coburn Promotions presented the Christmas pantomime Robinson Crusoe at the Brunton Theatre from 13 December 1979 to 5 January 1980. Ian Granville-Bell served as artistic director until 1986.

Charles Nowosielski was appointed artistic director at the Brunton Theatre in 1986, bringing Richard Cherns with him as musical director and composer. Their 1986/87 season included Joan Littlewood's Oh, What a Lovely War!, Sydney Goodsir Smith's The Wallace, Donald Mackenzie's The Warld Traiveller, Robert Bolt's A Man for All Seasons, Netta B. Reid's A Shepherd Beguiled, Howard Purdie's A Fine Romance, and Edward Stiven's Tamlane. The 1987/88 season included the Kander & Ebb musical Cabaret, Jay Presson Allen's adaptation of Muriel Spark's novel The Prime of Miss Jean Brodie, Edward Stiven's The Cauldron, David Purves's The Knicht o the Riddils, and John Bett's Sleeping Beauty.

Other productions included Stephen Macdonald's adaptation of The Jungle Book (1987 and 1989 tour), William Shakespeare's The Taming of the Shrew (1988), an Edinburgh International Festival production of James Bridie's Holy Isle, with Vivien Heilbron in the role of Margause, Queen of Orkney (1988), Robert Robertson's The Wizard of Oz (1988), Goodrich and Hackett's The Diary of Anne Frank (1988), The Bug Play (1988), Alexander Reid's The Warld's Wonder (1988), David Swan's Frankie MacStein: The Panto (1988-89), Anton Chekov's The Seagull (1989), Edward Stiven's Under the Passing Stars (1989), Hector MacMillan's The Rising (1989), Compton Mackenzie's Whisky Galore (1989), C.P. Taylor's Good (1989), Peter Hall and Adrian Mitchell's adaptation of Animal Farm (1989), David Swan's Ali MacBaba and the Tomb of Doom (1989), Daphne du Maurier's Rebecca (1990), Donald Campbell's The Fisher Boy and the Honest Lass (1990), George Bernard Shaw's Saint Joan (1990), and an Edinburgh International Festival production of Robert S. Silver's The Bruce (1991).

Sandy Neilson directed Simon Gray's comedy Stage Struck at the Brunton in February 1988. Jeffrey Daunton directed Agatha Christie's The Hollow in January and February 1989. On 23 March 1990, David Hayman directed Scottish People's Theatre production of Lynn Bains' Nae Problem at the Brunton.

Latterly, children's theatre company, Catherine Wheels, was the resident company, and the theatre was an Edinburgh Festival Fringe venue.
