= Joan Ure =

Scottish poet and playwright

Joan Ure was the pen name of Elizabeth Thoms Clark (née Carswell) (22 June 1918 – 1978), a Scottish poet and playwright.

== Life ==
She was born Elizabeth Thoms Carswell on 22 June 1918 in Wallsend, Tyneside, of Scottish parents who moved to Glasgow. She had a daughter, Frances, by Jack Clark, a businessman.

In the 1950s she chose the pen-name Ure, because it sounded more Scottish to her. Her deceased sister Joan provided the first half of her pen name.

Having been born in England made her self-consciously Scots, and she adopted an ironic refrain throughout her public writing: "Scottish, more or less" and "as Scots as I am". In correspondence she wrote "I could say I am an Englishman, and spite 'em all."

== Work ==
=== Drama ===
Joan Ure wrote short stories and poems as well as short plays, but she made her mark with her work for the theatre. She never wrote a full-length play. Her first play, Cendrillon, was written in French, for her 4th year school class to perform. One of her professionally produced works, I See Myself as This Young Girl, an exploration of a mother-daughter relationship, was directed by Michael Meacham at the Close Theatre Club, Glasgow, in 1967. It demonstrated her lyrical gifts. During her career Ure wrote over thirty short plays, several of which were performed across Scotland and on BBC radio.

Her companion dramas, Something in it for Cordelia and Something in it for Ophelia, are feminist revisionings of two female characters from works by Shakespeare. Both plays were staged on the Edinburgh Festival Fringe in 1971 in a basement room in Edinburgh’s George Square. They were a response to the staging of King Lear at the Assembly Hall as part of the official Edinburgh International Festival programme. Something in it for Cordelia was staged again by DundeeRep as part of a series of short plays directed by Charles Nowosielski in the late 1970s.

One of her best received plays is the revue Nothing May Come of It which incorporates song and dance. She characterises people she knew including her correspondent as the lead actress in Nothing May Come of It as well as Puck in Seven Characters out of the Dream.

Ure's play The Hard Case (1972) responded to the Ibrox Football Stadium disaster of 2nd January 1971, exploring survivor's guilt and the inexpressibility of grief.

=== Poetry ===
Death by suicide is one of the themes of her writing. Her poem, "In Memoriam", published in Scottish International in 1971, deals with the death of her sister Joan.

Her poem Signal at Red, written 1964, is addressed to her correspondent, John Cairns, and alludes to Ian Hamilton Finlay, with whom she had put on plays at the Falcon Theatre in 1962, hers being Punctuated Rhythms. He is also the disappointing lover referred to in her short story, Midsummer's Eve, published in Words 6 in 1978. She claims he was almost the death of her, though she doesn't specify how and there is nothing in her correspondence, 1963–1971, to suggest that she ever contemplated leaving her husband for him.

The Tiny Talent: Selected Poems by Joan Ure, edited by Richie McCaffery and Alistair Peebles, was published by Brae Editions in 2018.

Her correspondence with John Cairns provides a framework for understanding her life and work and is shortly to be published by Ki Publishing as CORRESPONDENCE.

== Scottish Society of Playwrights ==
Joan Ure, Ena Lamont Stewart, and Ada F. Kay were among the founder members of the Scottish Society of Playwrights, which was set up after a meeting called in September 1973 by Hector MacMillan, Lamont Stewart and John Hall.

== Acclaim in Scotland ==
A poem by Joan Ure was suggested by members of the public as one of the runners-up for the Scottish Parliament's Canongate Wall Project to commemorate the 10th anniversary of the Holyrood Parliament:

A country makes the artists it deserves / As it makes governments / Our artists shriek in paranoiac discords / When they are not just havering / You hope they do not feel they speak for you.

== Acclaim abroad ==
The University of Bologna, Italy, teaches several English Literature modules, using Joan Ure's plays Qualcosa anche per Cordelia (Something in it for Cordelia), and Sette Personaggi Venuti dal sogno (Seven Characters out of a dream).

- Dream English
- Cordelia English
- Cordelia English
- Characters English

The University of Parma, Italy, also uses two plays by Joan Ure in their English Literature programme: Come una ragazzina (1968) and Riprendi la tua costola ! (1974) are available in the Italian translation by Panozzo Editore who describe her works as "confronting the themes of the condition and emancipation of women .... with the irony which characterises the whole work of Joan Ure".

- https://web.archive.org/web/20100425015135/http://www.diplingue.unipr.it/Ricerca%20e%20pubblicazioni/Pagine%20personali/Angeletti.html
- https://www.ibs.it/code/9788874721337/ure-joan/come-una-ragazzina.html

== Later productions ==
Ure's plays Something in it for Cordelia and Something in it for Ophelia were staged on the Edinburgh Festival Fringe by Theatre Alba at Duddingston Kirk Gardens in August 2014.

== Sources ==
- Robert Crawford, Scotland's Books: A History of Scottish Literature, Oxford University Press, 2009, ISBN 0-19-538623-X, p. 635
