= Alexander Scott (20th-century poet) =

Scottish poet, playwright and scholar

- Born: November 28, 1920; Aberdeen
- Died: September 14, 1989
- Occupations: poet, playwright, literary critic
- Writing career
- Language: Scots
- Genres: poetry, drama
- Notable work: Untrue Thomas (1951)
- Movements: Scottish Renaissance, Scots Language

Alexander Scott was a Scottish poet, playwright and scholar born in Aberdeen. He wrote poetry in both Scots and Scottish English as well as plays, literary reviews and critical studies of literature. As a writer, scholar, dramatist, broadcaster, critic and editor, he showed a life-long commitment to Scottish literary culture. He was latterly a tutor and reader of Scottish literature at the University of Glasgow, where he was instrumental in establishing Scotland's first Department of Scottish Literature in the academic year 1971–72.

== Drama ==
Scott's Gift to the Queen, a play for radio about his 16th century namesake, the poet Alexander Scott, was written in 1948 and broadcast in 1949.

His verse drama, Untrue Thomas, which translates the return of Thomas the Rhymer to a contemporary setting, was well received and won first prize for Verse Drama and Scots Lyrics at the Festival of Britain in 1951, and first prize for full-length play from the Scottish Community Drama Association (SCDA) and the Arts Council in 1952. It was adapted for radio and broadcast on the BBC Third Programme in 1953.

Glasgow's Citizens Theatre produced three of Scott's plays; Right Royal (1954), Tam o' Shanter's Tryst (1955), and Truth to Tell (1957), and several were broadcast on radio or television.

== Language and literature ==
In 1972, Scott was one of the founders of the Lallans Society (later the Scots Language Society). He was a member of its committee from the outset and served as Preses from 1974 to 1977 and from 1979 to 1983. He also served as president of the Association for Scottish Literary Studies from 1976 to 1979. In 1985 he succeeded Robert McLellan as Honorary Preses.

=== New Writing Scotland ===
In 1983, Scott became a founding editor of the periodical New Writing Scotland.

On 27 November 1989, The Scots Independent and the Scots Language Society presented a celebration of the poetry and prose of Alexander Scott at the Netherbow Theatre in Edinburgh.

== Works ==
=== Books ===
- Selected Poems, Saltire Modern Poets series, Oliver and Boyd, Edinburgh, 1950
- Still Life: William Soutar, 1898 - 1943, Chambers, 1958
- The MacDiarmid Makars, 1923 - 1972, Akros Publications, 1972
- Double Agent: Poems in English and Scots, Akros Publications, 1972
- Neil M. Gunn: The Man and the Writer (contributing editor), Blackwood, Edinburgh, 1973, ISBN 9780851581156
- Selected Poems, 1943 - 1974, Akros Publications, 1975
- Modern Scots Verse 1922 - 1977 (Editor), Akros Publications, 1978
- Scotch Passion: An Anthology of Scottish Erotic Poetry (Editor), Robert Hale, 1982
- Voices of Our Kind: An Anthology of Modern Scottish Poetry from 1920 to the Present (Editor), Larousse Kingfisher Chambers, 1987
- The Comic Poems of William Tennant (Editor), Association for Scottish Literary Studies, 1989
- Sing Frae the Hert: The Literary Criticism of Alexander Scott (edited by Neil R. MacCallum), Scottish Cultural Press, 1996, ISBN 9781898218708

=== Plays ===
- Untrue Thomas, Caledonian Press, Glasgow, 1952

=== Articles ===
- The Makar Fergusson, in Annand, J.K. (ed.), Lallans, Number 2: Whitsunday 1974, The Lallans Society, pp. 7–9
- Edwin Morgan: Experimenter Extraordinary, in Lindsay, Maurice (ed.), The Scottish Review: Arts and Environment 28, November 1982, pp. 22–26, ISSN 0140-0894
- Pink Elephants in Anstruther: Scottish Identity, in Lindsay, Maurice (ed.), The Scottish Review: Arts and Environment 33, February 1984, pp. 3–8, ISSN 0140-0894

== Reviews ==
- Campbell, Ian (1975), review of Selected Poems, 1943 - 1974, in Burnett, Ray (ed.), Calgacus No. 3, Spring 1976, pp. 54–56, ISSN 0307-2029
