= John Brunton =

John Brunton may refer to:

- John Brunton (actor) (1741–1822), English actor
- John Brunton (manufacturer) (1837–1917), Scottish manufacturer and philanthropist
- John Brunton (scenic artist) (1849–1909), Scottish scenic artist
- John Brunton (cricketer) (1869–1962), English cricketer
- John Brunton (producer), Canadian film and television producer
