= William Hershaw =

Scottish writer

William Hershaw (born Newport On Tay, Fife, 19 March 1957) is a Scottish poet, playwright, musician and Scots language activist.

Hershaw's first major collection of poetry, The Cowdenbeath Man, Scottish Cultural Press, 1998, was a series of elegies about the decline of the coal mining industry in Central Fife. He won the Callum MacDonald Award for Winter Song in 2005, and The McCash Prize for Scots Poetry in 2011.

In 2012, he revived The Bowhill Players (originally a drama company founded by playwright Joe Corrie during the General Strike of 1926) as a musical ensemble, performing at The Edinburgh Festival Fringe and creating new musical settings for Corrie's poetry.

In 2016, Grace Note published his Scots version of The Tempest and Michael, a ballad play about the medieval polymath Michael Scot of Balwearie. An audio recording of Michael was released under the Scotsoun label in 2021, performed by the Bowhill Players.

The Sair Road, published in 2018, is Hershaw's Scot's Language version of the Stations of the Cross set during the 1984 Miners' strike. This is a collection of poems illustrated by artist Les McConnell.

In 2020, Hershaw was runner up in the Scots poetry competition at the Wigtown Book Festival.

Further collaboration with McConnell produced Earth Bound Companions and Saul Vaigers - A Scottish Saints Calendar, both published in 2021.

William Hershaw is a member of the editorial board of the Scots Language Society.

== Bibliography ==
=== Poetry collections ===
- Four Fife Poets/Fower Brigs Ti A Kinrick (with John Brewster, Harvey Holton, Tom Hubbard, Harvey Holton), Aberdeen University Press, 1988
- The Cowdenbeath Man, Scottish Cultural Press, 1997 ISBN 1 898218 68 4
- Fifty Fife Sonnets/Makars, Akros Publications, 2005
- Johnny Aathin, Windfall Publications, 2010 ISBN 978 0 9557264 3 9
- Happyland, Fras Publications, 2011
- Postcairds Fae Woodwick Mill, Orkney Poems in Scots, Grace Note, 2015 ISBN 978-1-907676-62-8
- Stars are the Aisles, Neepheid Press, 2016 ISBN 978-0-9956504-0-4
- Buirds, Roncadora Press, 2017
- The Sair Road, Grace Note Publications, 2018 ISBN 978-1-907676-96-3
- Earth Bound Companions, Grace Note Publications, 2021 ISBN 978-1-913162-15-3
- Saul Vaigers, Grace Note Publications, 2021 ISBN 978-1-913162-1-39

=== Selected Poetry Anthologies ===
- Dream State - The New Scottish Poets, Polygon, 1994
- Scotlands - Poets and the Nation, Carcanet, 2004
- Skein of Geese - Poems from the 2008 Stanza Festival, Stanza Publications
- The Smeddum Test, 21st Century Poems in Scots, Kennedy and Boyd, 2012
- Scotia Nova, Luath Press, 2014

=== Drama ===
- The Tempest, translated in Scots, Grace Note, 2016 ISBN 978-1-907676-75-8
- Michael Scot of Balwearie, A Ballad Play in Scots, Grace Note, 2016, ISBN 978-1-907676-76-5
- Jennie Lee’s History Project, Grace Note, 2017

=== Novel ===
- Tammy Norrie, The House Daemon Of Seahouses, Grace Note Publications, 2014 ISBN 978-1-907676-43-7

=== Music ===
- A Fish Laid At The Door, Dances With Whippets Records/Birnam CD; 2002
- A Song Cycle For Craigencalt Ecology Centre, Dances With Whippets Records/Birnam CD 2009
- Cage Load Of Men - The Joe Corrie Project, Bowhill Players, Fife Council/Fras Publications/ Birnam CD 2013

=== Education ===
- Teaching Scots Language, Learning Teaching Scotland, 2002
- Scots Language and Literature - Examples and Activities, Learning Teaching Scotland, 2002
