= The Outlaw (play) =

1871 play by August Strindberg

- Original language: Swedish
- Written by: August Strindberg
- Characters: Thorfinn; Valgerd; Gunlöd; Gunnar
- Genre: Norse Saga
- Setting: Medieval Iceland ca. 1100 AD

Premiere
- Date: October 16, 1871
- Place: Royal Theatre; Stockholm, Sweden

The Outlaw (Swedish: Den fredlöse) is a one-act play by Swedish playwright August Strindberg written in 1871 when he was a 22-year-old struggling University student who had yet to become a successful author. The story is based on old Viking sagas for which to prepare Strindberg taught himself Icelandic to read the old sagas. Soon after the premier at the Royal Theater, the King of Sweden, Charles XV, summoned Strindberg to his palace to tell him how much he enjoyed it and to offer help with the young writer's tuition. It was a seminal moment in Strindberg's career, allowing him to continue his studies and gaining him confidence and reputation as a writer.

== Plot ==
The story is set in Iceland, inside a rough shewn log building with wooden benches along two walls, a wood throne on the third wall, two windows and a single door on the fourth wall.

Gunlöd, the daughter of Viking leader Thorfinn, stands quietly at an open window, and gazes out over the ocean. Valgerd, her mother, speaks about their shared grief over father Thorfinn's hard and unloving manner. In addition to the family's move from Sweden to Iceland, Gunlöd laments at having been forced to part with her dear childhood friend, the young man Gunnar, who has gone on Crusade in the Holy Land and who she has not seen in years.

Valgerd leaves the room and Gunnar unexpectedly enters, his ship having just arrived. Gunnar expresses his love and asks Gunlöd to return with him to Sweden. Gunlöd is coy but reveals that she secretly believes in the Christian god that her pagan father hates. Gunlöd is evidently torn between loyalty to her father, who is pagan, and her young Christian lover. Gunnar leaves the room before Valgerd returns, but says his ship will be waiting that night for her to make up her mind to go with him.

The night brings a terrible storm and with it Thorfinn's ship returns home from Norway. Thorfinn enters the house and in celebration he asks his daughter to drink from a horn of Odin, a pagan act. Gunlöd refuses, confessing that she is a Christian and not pagan. The proud Thorfinn is mortified and angry with his disloyal daughter. Meanwhile, a messenger enters and informs Thorfinn that a local council has banished him from Iceland for past deeds of theft and murder, he must leave at once or defend himself in combat. Thorfinn fights bravely outside the home while Gunlöd watches from the window. He defeats his enemies, but is mortally wounded and dies while seated on his throne surrounded by wife, daughter and Gunnar. Thorfinn's last words, "Eternal.. Creating.. God", show he has accepted the Christian religion and blessed the union of Gunlöd and Gunnar.

== Themes ==
The story is written in the style of a traditional Icelandic saga and is about the struggle between paganism and Christianity. It is about the struggle between God and man, and man and woman.

== History ==
The young Strindberg had written four plays by this time in his life, but none of them had met with any success. He was still in University and struggling to pay his tuition due to a dispute with his father who had cut off support. A friend, Eisen, suggested he write some plays purposefully designed for acceptance at the Royal Theater. For this he wrote two one-act plays, In Rome and The Outlaw. In Rome was accepted and saw eleven performances at the Dramaten, and on its strength The Outlaw was also accepted for performance. The Outlaw opened at the Royal Theatre on 16 October 1871 and was first published in December 1876 in the magazine Nu.

The play was little regarded by critics, but the King of Sweden, Charles XV, was so impressed with The Outlaw he summoned Strindberg to see him. Strindberg thought it was a joke, but after confirming by telegram he attended the summons. As related by biographer Warner Oland:

The kindly old King spoke of the pleasure the ancient Viking spirit of The Outlaw had given him, and said, "You are the son of Strindberg, the steamship agent, I believe, and so, of course, are not in need." "Quite the reverse," Strindberg replied, explaining that his father no longer gave him the meager help toward his university course which he had formerly done. "I'm rather short of cash myself," said the King quite frankly, "but do you think you could manage on eight hundred riksdaler a year?" Strindberg was overwhelmed by such munificence, and the interview ended with his introduction to the court treasurer from whom he received his first quarter's allowance [University tuition] of two hundred crowns.

Strindberg in his memoirs relates that in 1870 he wrote a five-act verse-play called Blot-Sven (Blot-Sven was a Swedish king ca. 1080), but he was unhappy with it and burned the manuscript. "From the ashes", he relates, arose The Outlaw, which was "undoubtedly influenced by Bjørnson's masterly one-acter Between the Battles, which I found to be ideal as a model. For in the course of time people had grown impatient and had come to expect swift results. Thus the tempo increased".

== Professional productions ==
In 2009, a translation into Scots by David Purves titled The Ootlaw was produced by Theatre Alba at Duddingston Kirk on the Edinburgh Festival Fringe, with Charles Nowosielski directing and taking the role of Thorfinn.
