= Neil MacCallum =

Neil R. MacCallum (15 May 1954 – 9 November 2002) was a Scottish nationalist political activist and poet.

Born in Edinburgh, MacCallum studied at Firrhill High School and Napier College before working for the Lothian Health Board. In this role, he joined the NALGO trade union and served for a while as a shop steward. He joined the Scottish National Party (SNP) while young, and attended the 1972 Plaid Cymru conference with a group of friends from the SNP, drawing attention by playing the bagpipes at the event.

MacCallum was elected to Edinburgh City Council in 1977, representing Wester Hailes. He lost his seat in 1980, but was elected as Assistant National Secretary of the SNP, then National Secretary the following year. While Secretary, he chaired the SNP Commission of Inquiry into the party's structures, and it was he who convinced party leader Gordon Wilson to include Alex Salmond as a member. He also stood as a candidate in the 1983 general election in Edinburgh South, taking fourth place with 5.0% of the vote. He stood down in 1986, following ill health, and was succeeded by his assistant, John Swinney.

MacCallum also wrote poetry in Lowland Scots, his work first appearing in "Out of Charity" in 1973, and from the late 1980s, he published compilations of other poetry in the language. In the 1990s, he became active in the Scots Language Society and served on the board of the Scottish Poetry Library, and acted as arts correspondent for the Scots Independent newspaper. He succeeded David Purves as editor of Lallans in 1995 and co-edited an anthology of writing from the magazine with him in the same year.

In later life, MacCallum suffered with depression and problematic drinking, and went missing on several occasions. In November 2002, he fell into the Union Canal and died later the same day from hypothermia.

Party political offices
| Preceded by Iain Murray | National Secretary of the Scottish National Party; 1981–1986 | Succeeded by John Swinney |
