= Florence Harrison =

Australian artist (1877–1955)

- Born: Florence Susan Harrison; 1877; Brisbane, Australia
- Died: 1955 (aged 77–78); Brighton, England
- Occupations: illustrator of poetry and children's books
- Known for: Art Nouveau and Pre-Raphaelite styles
- Notable work: see Books
- Parents: Norwood Harrison (father); Lucy Harrison (mother)

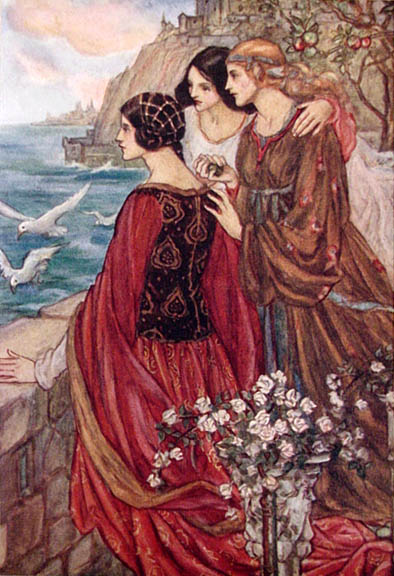
Florence Harrison - illustration from "Early Poems" by William Morris

Florence Susan Harrison (1877–1955) was an Australian illustrator of poetry and children's books in Art Nouveau and Pre-Raphaelite styles. Many of her books were published by Blackie and Son. She illustrated books by Pre-Raphaelite circle poets Christina Rossetti, William Morris and Sir Alfred Tennyson.

Harrison has often been confused with Emma Florence Harrison, an English artist who exhibited at the Royal Academy in 1887.

== Biography ==
Florence Harrison was born in Brisbane, Australia, in 1877 to Lucy and Norwood Harrison. From 1922, she lived in the London area. Around 1940 she moved to Brighton, England, to live with her cousin Isobel. She remained there until her death in 1955.

== Books ==
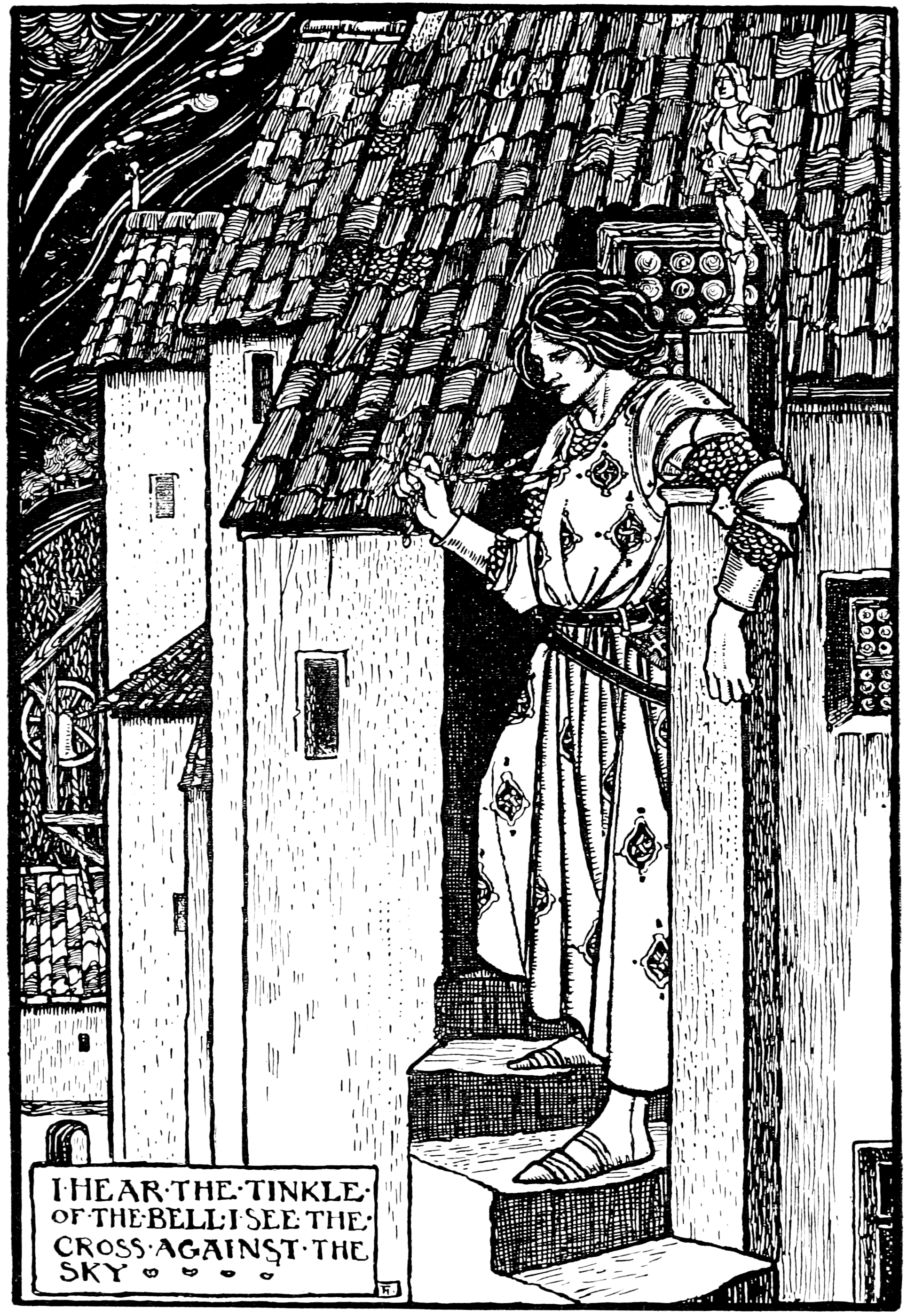
Illustration from Early poems of William Morris, 1914

- Rhymes and Reasons (1905)
- The Rhyme of a Run (1907) – repackaged and retitled as Tales in Rhyme and Colour (1916)
- Rhyme of a Farm
- In the Fairy Ring (1908) – first four and last five stories repackaged and retitled as two volumes: The Pixy Book and The Man in the Moon (1917)
- Goblin Market, and other Poems by Christina Rossetti (1910)
- Guinevere and other poems by Alfred Tennyson (1912)
- Elfin Song (1912)
- Early Poems by William Morris (1914)
- Three Silver Pennies by Dorothy King (1914)
- Tinkler Johnny by Agnes Grozier Herbertson (1916)
- Poems by Samuel Ferguson (1916)
- The House of Bricks by Agnes Grozier Herbertson (1918)
- Godmother's Garden by Netta Syrett (1918)
- Blackie's Children's Diary (1921)
- Beautiful Poems series of shorter versions (eight color plates each) of older works published in 1923 by Blackie:
  - The Fairy Kites by Ethel K. Crawford (1927)
  - Mopsa the Fairy by Jean Ingelow (1932)
  - The Magic Duck and Other Stories by Dorothy King (1939)

Other works attributed to her but probably done by Emma Florence Harrison or another artist with the same name:

- Light of Love published by Arthur L. Humphreys (1908)
- A series of fairy postcards printed by Vivian Mansell & Co. Ltd. (1932)
