= Lallans =

Term used to refer to the Scottish language

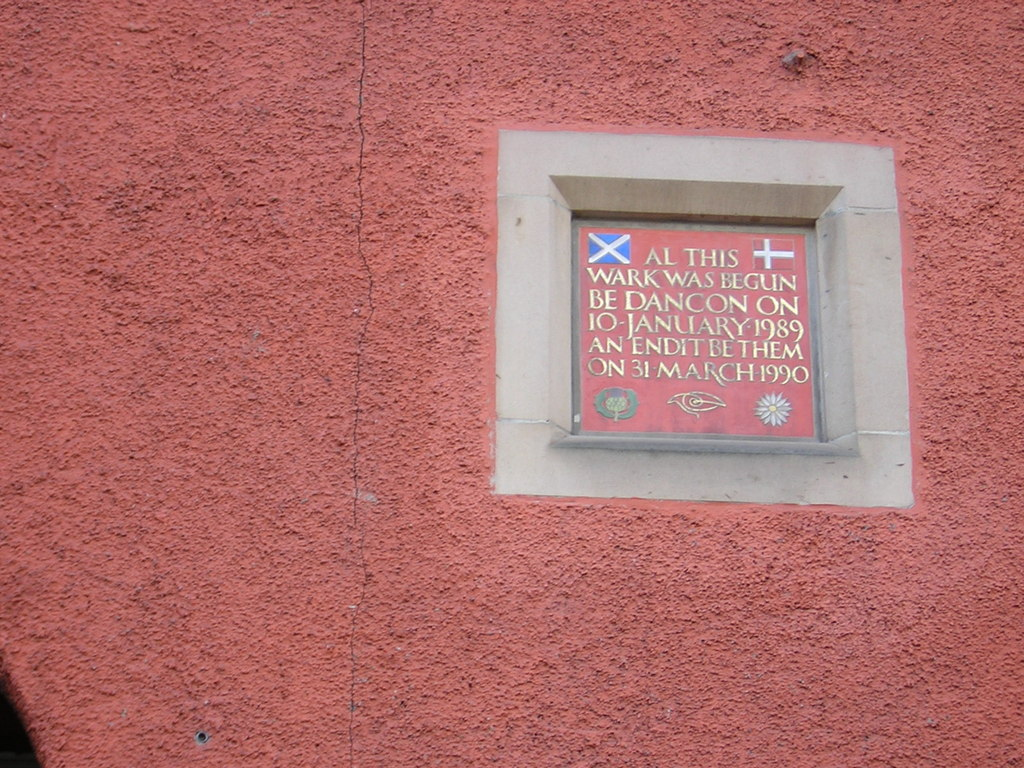
Commemorative plaque in Lallans, Edinburgh

Lallans (/ˈlælənz/ LAL-ənz, Scots: [ˈlɑːlən(d)z, ˈlo̜ːl-]; a Modern Scots variant of the word lawlands, referring to the lowlands of Scotland), means the Scots language, or certain varieties of it.

The term was traditionally used to refer to the Scots as a whole. However, more recent interpretations assume it refers to the dialects of south and central Scotland, while Doric, a term once used to refer to Scots dialects in general, is now generally seen to refer to the Mid Northern Scots dialects spoken in the north-east of Scotland.

== Burns and Stevenson ==
Both Robert Burns and Robert Louis Stevenson used it to refer to the Scots language as a whole.

They took nae pains their speech to balance,
Or rules to gie;
But spak their thoughts in plain, braid lallans,
Like you or me.

—Robert Burns in Epistle To William Simson

"What tongue does your auld bookie speak?"
He'll spier; an' I, his mou to steik:
"No bein' fit to write in Greek,
I wrote in Lallan,
Dear to my heart as the peat reek,
Auld as Tantallon.

—Robert Louis Stevenson in "The Maker to Posterity"

== Synthetic Scots ==
The term Lallans was also used during the Scottish Renaissance of the early 20th century to refer to what Hugh MacDiarmid called synthetic Scots, i.e., a synthesis integrating, blending, and combining various forms of the Scots language, both vernacular and archaic. This was intended as a classical, standard Scots for a world-class literature.

Sydney Goodsir Smith in his 1951 essay "A Short Introduction to Scottish Literature" commented:

“When MacDiarmid spoke of 'Synthetic Scots', he merely referred to another aspect of this necessary revolution; that we should forget the whole poverty-stricken 'dialect' tradition that Burns and his predecessors had unconsciously been responsible for, and use again all the rich resources of the language as Dunbar and the Makars had used it, as had Burns and Fergusson, Scott, Galt, Stevenson, and George Douglas Brown. In fact to make a synthesis where for too long there had been "disintegration".

However, the result was more often than not Scots words grafted on to a standard English grammatical structure somewhat removed from traditional spoken Scots, its main practitioners not being habitual Lowland Scots speakers themselves. "In addition, the present century has seen the conscious creation of a 'mainstream' variety of Scots — a standard literary variety,... referred to as 'synthetic Scots', now generally goes under the name Lallans (=Lowlands).... In its grammar and spelling, it shows the marked influence of Standard English, more so than other Scots dialects."

MacDiarmid's detractors often referred to it as plastic Scots — a word play on synthetic as in synthetic plastics — to emphasize its artificiality.

Roy Campbell, a South African poet of proudly Scottish descent and political opponent and critic of MacDiarmid since the Spanish Civil War, in later life poked fun at MacDiarmid's use of Synthetic Scots in the poem Ska-hawtch Wha Hae! A Likkle wee poom i'th' Aulde Teashoppe Pidgin Brogue, Lallands or Butter-Scotch (Wi' apooligees to MockDiarmid). In a footnote explaining the poem, Campbell scholar Joseph Pearce wrote, "MacDiarmid championed the use of Scots... in poetry, often employing traditional or regional parochialisms in artificial or dubious contexts."

Sydney Goodsir Smith, however, defended the literary use of the idiom in his Epistle to John Guthrie:

We've come intil a gey queer time
Whan scrievin Scots is near a crime,
'There's no one speaks like that', they fleer,
-But wha the deil spoke like King Lear?

== Magazines ==
Lallans is the name of the magazine of the Scots Language Society.

In Ulster the neologism Ullans merging Ulster and Lallans is often used to refer to a revived literary variety of Ulster Scots. The magazine of the Ulster Scots Language Society is also named Ullans.

== See also ==
- History of the Scots language
