= Scottish Field =

Scottish monthly magazine

- Categories: Cultural magazine
- Frequency: Monthly
- First issue: 1903
- Company: Wyvex Media Ltd
- Country: Scotland
- Based in: Edinburgh
- Website: scottishfield.co.uk
- ISSN: 0036-9209

Scottish Field is a Scottish monthly magazine which covers traditional, leisure, and historical interests.

== History and profile ==
The magazine was established by former railway booking clerk and advertising executive John MacMurtie in Glasgow in May 1903, following the model of the field sports magazine The Field in England.

In 1931 the outdoors journal was taken over by Henry Munro, then acquired in the 1960s by Sir Hugh Fraser's Universal Investments group when it came under the wing of George Outram & Co. In the 1960s the magazine achieved a 68,000 circulation.

Under the editorship of Roddy Martine in 1976 the magazine was based in Edinburgh before moving to Glasgow after a management buyout. Under the editorship of Archie Mackenzie from 1994 to 2010, the magazine moved to Edinburgh, celebrated its centenary year in 2003 and in 2007 was named Consumer Magazine of the Year at the Scottish Magazine Awards. Since November 1994 Scottish Field has been owned by Howard Bennett. Its editor since 2010 is Richard Bath.

Notable contributors have included Edwin Muir, Bud Neill, Lewis Spence, Neil Gunn, David Daiches, Maurice Lindsay, George Mackay Brown and Marion Chesney, who was fashion editor.
