= Richie McCaffery =

English poet

Richie McCaffery (born 1986) is an English poet born in Newcastle who lived in Ghent, Belgium until 2018. He now resides in the UK in Northumberland. He was a 2011 Hawthornden fellow at Hawthornden Castle, a writer in residence at Brownsbank for the Biggar Trust and a recipient of a 2009 Edwin Morgan Travel Bursary. He was a guest poet at the 2019 Stanza Poetry Festival.

== Life and works ==
McCaffery was born in Newcastle and grew up in Warkworth, Northumberland. Later he moved to Scotland where he completed a PhD in Scottish Literature at the University of Glasgow. He is the author of three poetry collections Summer / Break (Shoestring Press, 2022), Passport (Nine Arches Press, 2018), Cairn (Nine Arches Press, 2014). He has also written a handful of poetry pamphlets Spinning Plates (HappenStance Press, 2012), Ballast Flint (Cromarty Arts Trust 2013), First Hare (Mariscat Press, 2020) and Coping Stones (Fras Publications, 2021). He edited Sydney Goodsir Smith: Essays on his life and work (Brill, 2020) and Finishing the Picture: The Collected Poems of Ian Abbot, which was published by Kennedy & Boyd in 2015. He also co-edited, with Alistair Peebles The Tiny Talent: Selected Poems by Joan Ure which was published by Brae Editions in 2018.
