= The Princess and the Goblin =

1872 novel by George MacDonald

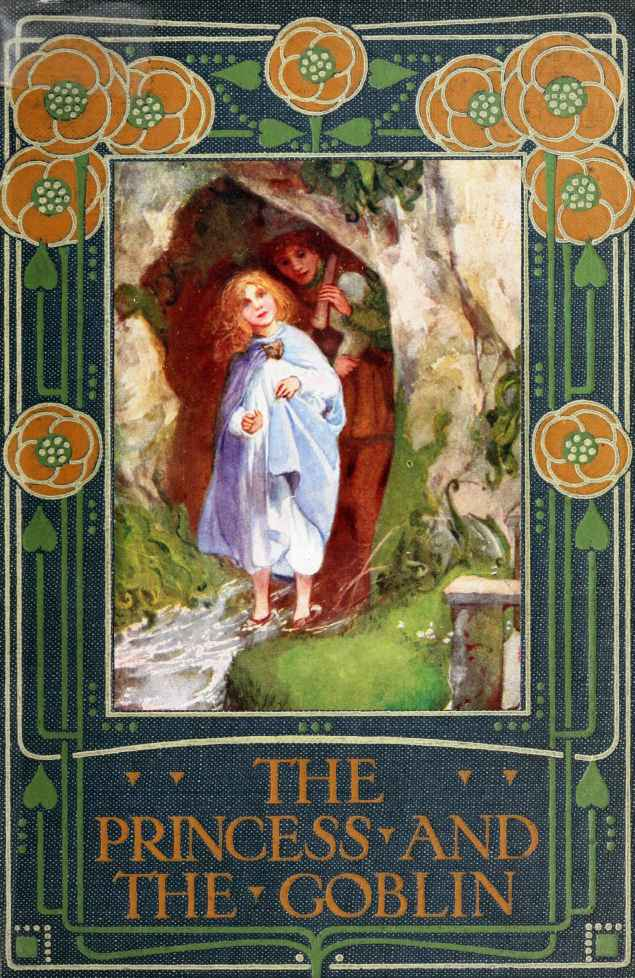
- Cover of the 1911 Blackie and Son edition, illustrator uncredited (Note: WorldCat library records report "twelve full-page illustrations in colour, and thirty text illustrations in black and white", presumably from the title page; and 308 pages, 12 plates: OCLC 1114809890, OCLC 16568450. Retrieved 11 October 2019. Probably the 12 colour illustrations are by a new artist and the 30 black-and-white are those by Hughes from the original serial and book publications, both uncredited in this edition. Other publishers created new editions thus, with artwork credited. For instance, J. B. Lippincott used new colour illustrations by Maria L. Kirk in 1907, OCLC 1582102.)
- Author: George MacDonald
- Illustrator: Arthur Hughes (serial and 1872 book)
- Genre: Children's fantasy novel
- Publisher: Strahan & Co.
- Publication date: 1872
- Publication place: United Kingdom
- Media type: Print
- Pages: 308, 12 plates (1911, Blackie and Son, above)
- Followed by: The Princess and Curdie
- Text: The Princess and the Goblin at Wikisource

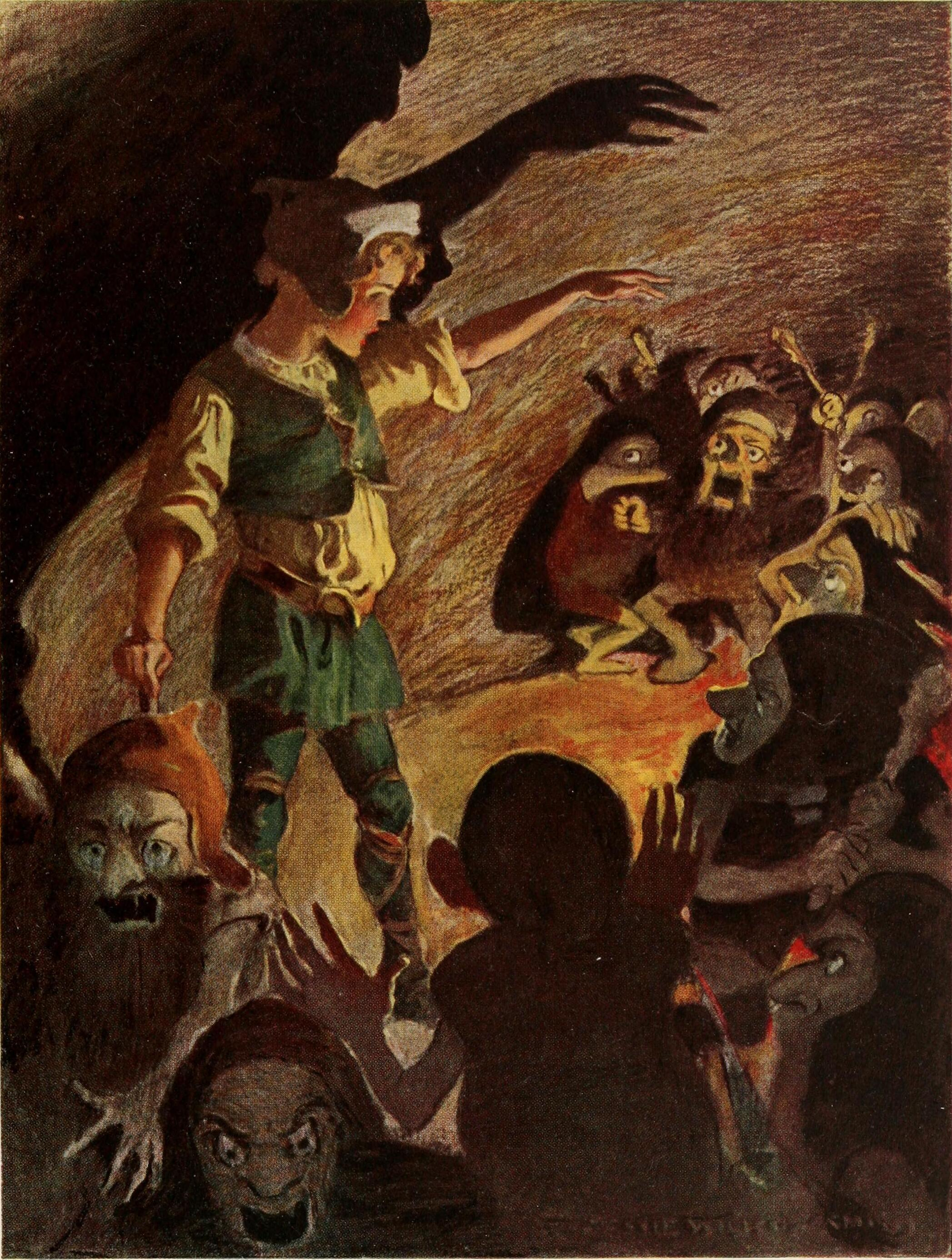
The Princess and the Goblin by George MacDonald, illustrated by Jessie Willcox Smith, 1920

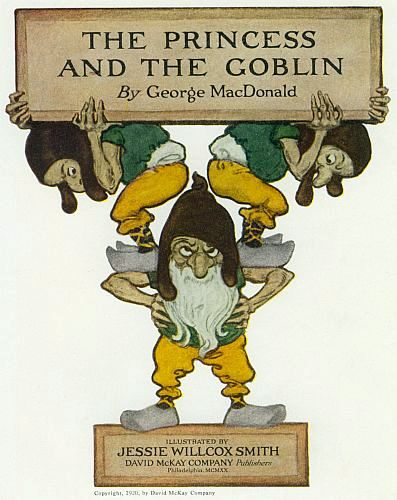
From The Princess and the Goblin by George MacDonald, illustrated by Jessie Willcox Smith, 1920 ed.

The Princess and the Goblin is a children's fantasy novel by George MacDonald. It was published in 1872 by Strahan & Co., with black-and-white illustrations by Arthur Hughes. Strahan had published the story and illustrations as a serial in the monthly magazine Good Words for the Young, beginning November 1870.

Anne Thaxter Eaton writes in A Critical History of Children's Literature that The Princess and the Goblin and its sequel both "quietly suggest in every incident ideas of courage and honor". Jeffrey Holdaway, in the New Zealand Art Monthly, said that both books start out as "normal fairytales, but slowly become stranger", and that they contain layers of symbolism similar to that of Lewis Carroll's work.

== Summary ==
Eight-year-old Princess Irene lives a lonely life in a castle in a desolate, mountainous kingdom, with only her nursemaid Lootie for company. Her father, the king, is normally absent, and her mother is dead. Unknown to her, the nearby mines are inhabited by a race of goblins, long banished from the kingdom and anxious to take revenge on their human neighbours.

One rainy day, the princess explores the castle and discovers a mysterious and very old lady who identifies herself as Irene's great-great-grandmother and namesake. The next day, Princess Irene heads outside but is chased by goblins and rescued by a young miner, Curdie. Irene is on her way to meet with her great-great-grandmother again, but is frightened by a cat and escapes up the mountain. There, she sees the light from her great-great-grandmother's tower window that leads her back. Her great-great-grandmother gives Irene a ring attached to an invisible thread, which connects her constantly to home.

Working in the mines, Curdie overhears the goblins talking and learns their weakness: They have very soft, vulnerable feet. He also hears that the goblins intend to flood the mine. When Curdie explores the goblins' domain, he is discovered by the goblins and stamps on their feet with great success; however, when he tries to stamp on the Goblin Queen's feet, she is protected by her stone shoes and captures him. The goblins put Curdie in their prison, and while imprisoned, he overhears that the goblins are digging a tunnel under the king's palace, where they plan to abduct the Princess and marry her to their Queen's son, Prince Harelip.

Irene's magic thread leads her safely to Curdie's rescue; during their escape, he steals one of the Goblin Queen's stone shoes. Irene takes Curdie to meet her great-great-grandmother but he cannot see her: She is only visible to Irene. Curdie warns the palace guards about the goblins' plans to tunnel into the palace, but the guards imprison him instead of heeding his warning. While imprisoned a second time, in the palace, Curdie contracts a fever through a wound in his leg, until Irene's great-great-grandmother heals him.

The goblins come to abduct the princess, but Curdie escapes from the palace prison and stamps on the invading goblins' feet. He follows the magic thread to Irene's refuge at his own house, and restores her to the king. When the goblins flood their tunnels, the water enters the palace, but Curdie warns the people inside and they are able to leave safely. Back-flow of the floodwater drowns the goblins.

In recognition of his protection of Irene and the people in the palace, the grateful king asks Curdie to serve as a bodyguard, but he refuses, saying he cannot leave his mother and father. Instead, he accepts a gift of a new red petticoat for his mother.

== Publication history ==
The Princess and the Goblin was first serialised in the children’s periodical Good Words for the Young, where it appeared between November 1870 and June 1871. This was accompanied by a series of 30 illustrations by Arthur Hughes. In a letter George MacDonald wrote to his wife, dated to the 25th February 1871, he stated that “I know it is as good a work of the kind as I can do, and I think it will be the most complete thing I have done.” Despite this, sales of Good Words for the Young began to slow, which the story was blamed for. Strahan, his publisher, stated that it had “too much of the fairy element” in it. It was published separately in novel form by Strahan & Co in December 1871, although the publication date was listed as 1872. The first American publication also came in 1871 through Routledge, New York.

== Themes ==
MacDonald’s depiction of the goblins portray them as descendants of individuals who had fled underground to escape from the strict laws of society. Within the opening of the novel, MacDonald states that

“there was a legend current in the country that at one time they lived above ground, and were very like other people. But for some reason or other, concerning which there were different legendary theories, the king had laid what they thought too severe taxes upon them ... According to the legend, however, instead of going to some other country, they had all taken refuge in the subterranean caverns.”

This synthesis of folkloric and anthropological elements reflected a persistent evolutionary theory in contemporary Victorian society, which conflated mythological tales of fairies with folk memories of a primordial race.

The conclusion of the novel, in which Curdie tricks the goblins into flooding their underground kingdom in an extended reference of the Biblical Flood, can therefore be read as an act of God in excising the goblins, who are depicted as morally and physically degenerate. This is MacDonald’s attempt to synthesise scientific, pagan, and Christian elements into a single unified system of ethics and morals. It has been observed, however, that this final sequence is both shocking and disturbing, depicting as it does the extermination of innocent animals alongside the “evil” goblins.

== Film adaptations ==
In the 1960s, the novel was adapted in animated form by Jay Ward for his Fractured Fairy Tales series. This version involved a race of innocent goblins who are forced to live underground. The ugly goblin king falls in love with a beautiful princess, but a prince saves her by reciting poetry (because goblins hate poetry).

A full-length animated adaptation of the book, directed by József Gémes, was released in 1992 in the United Kingdom, and in June 1994 in the United States. This Hungary / Wales / Japan co-production, created at Budapest's PannóniaFilm, Japan's NHK, and S4C and Siriol Productions in Great Britain, starred the voices of Joss Ackland, Claire Bloom, William Hootkins and Rik Mayall. Robin Lyons produced the film, wrote its screenplay, and voiced the Goblin King character.

The animated film was released in the United States by Hemdale Film Corporation in Summer 1994, but it received negative reviews and was commercial failure (compared to Disney's very successful The Lion King that was released in the U.S. in the same month), only grossed $1.8 million domestically.

== Other adaptations ==
- The book was adapted for stage by Gracer Calvert Holland in 1926; which was published in script form by Erskine MacDonald before it was performed.
- A 1930 theatrical adaptation was published by W.H. Baker in Boston. The title was changed to The Princess and the Goblins.
- Shirley Temple played Princess Irene in a production on an episode of her television show. Although the plot follows the basic outline of Macdonald's story, it glosses over the darker elements and is played primarily as comedy. Irene and Curdie are portrayed as young adults instead of children (with hints of a budding romance), and the goblins are forgiven their evil deeds and reform.
- It was a book in the "100 Classic Books" collection for the Nintendo DS.
- Twyla Tharp used the story in the full-length ballet of the same title. It was her first ballet to incorporate children and was co-commissioned by Atlanta Ballet and Royal Winnipeg Ballet in 2012.
- Other playwrights that have adapted The Princess and the Goblin include Sandra Fenichel Asher and Stuart Paterson

== Legacy ==
The sequel to this book is The Princess and Curdie.

- In Rudyard Kipling's 1888 short story Wee Willie Winkie, the hero's course is inspired by his having "once been read to, out of a big blue book, the history of the Princess and the Goblins [sic]—a most wonderful tale of a land where the Goblins were always warring with the children of men until they were defeated by one Curdie."
- Author Douglas Anderson suggests that J. R. R. Tolkien's depictions of goblins within Tolkien's legendarium was heavily influenced by the goblins in The Princess and the Goblin.
- In C. S. Lewis' novel That Hideous Strength, Elwin Ransom says that he lives "like the king in Curdie", and later in the novel, Jane Studdock reads the "Curdie books".
- G. K. Chesterton wrote of The Princess and the Goblin:

I for one can really testify to a book that has made a difference to my whole existence, which helped me to see things in a certain way from the start; a vision of things which even so real a revolution as a change of religious allegiance has substantially only crowned and confirmed. Of all the stories I have read, including even all the novels of the same novelist, it remains the most real, the most realistic, in the exact sense of the phrase the most like life. It is called The Princess and the Goblin, and is by George MacDonald, the man who is the subject of this book.

— G. K. Chesterton, "Introduction" to George MacDonald and His Wife (1924), page 1

- The Princess and the Goblins is the title of an unrelated poem by Sylvia Plath (1932–1963).
