= J. K. Annand =

Scottish poet

- Born: James King Annand; 3 February 1908; Edinburgh, Scotland
- Died: 8 June 1993 (aged 85); Edinburgh, Scotland
- Occupations: Teacher, Poet
- Movement: Scots Language

James King Annand MBE (2 February 1908 – 8 June 1993) was a Scottish poet best known for his children's poems.

== Biography ==
Born at Edinburgh to Maggie Gold and her husband, plumber William Annand, He was educated at Broughton Secondary School, and graduated from the University of Edinburgh in 1930. He later taught at schools in Edinburgh and Whithorn. He also translated poetry and fiction from German and medieval Latin into Scots. His adult poems include translations of Bavarian folksongs and of Carmina Burana.

In 1925, Annand wrote a review of Hugh MacDiarmid's seminal publication Sangshaw and he worked with MacDiarmid on the establishment of Scottish PEN in 1927.

During World War II, Annand served in the Royal Navy, taking part in the Murmansk convoys.

He was a strong supporter of the Scottish Youth Hostel Association and his experiences as a hill walker and in the war at sea inspired many of his poems published in newspapers and magazines and later collected in his Two Voices (1968). His bairnrhymes were influenced by the children's poetry in Scots written by William Soutar.

Annand was a founder member of Scots Language Society in 1972 and the founding editor of Lallans, a magazine for writing in Scots published by the Scots Language Society, from 1973 to 1983. His poem 'Arctic Convoy' won the 1956 prize for Best Original Poem in the Scottish Dialect of the Burns Federation. He bequeathed the rights to his work, and royalties from it, to Dictionaries of the Scots Language SCIO.

He died in Edinburgh in 1993.

== Collections of children's poetry ==
- Sing it Aince for Pleisure (1970)
- Twice for Joy (1973)
- Thrice to Show Ye (1979)
- A Wale o Rhymes (1989); reissued in 1998 as Bairn Rhymes

== Other works ==
- Two Voices (1968)
- Poems and translations (1975)
- Songs from Carmina burana (1978)
- A Scots handsel (1980)
- Selected Poems, 1925-1990 (1992)

== Recognition ==
- 1958 - chairman of the Edinburgh Branch of the Saltire Society.
- 1979 - Scottish Arts Council special award for his contribution to Scottish Poetry.
- 1993 - Posthumous MBE for his services to Scots Language and Literature.
- 2008 - Commemorative stone in the Makars' Court
- 2015 - Posthumous award of the Arctic Star for his war service in the Royal Navy during WW2
