= William Neill (poet) =

Scottish poet (1922–2010)

- Born: 22 February 1922; Prestwick, Scotland
- Died: 5 April 2010 (aged 88); Dalbeattie, Scotland
- Resting place: Crossmichael Churchyard
- Education: Edinburgh University
- Occupation: Poet
- Writing career
- Language: Scottish Gaelic; Irish language; Scots; English
- Genre: Poetry

William Neill (22 February 1922 – 5 April 2010) was a Scottish poet who wrote in Scottish Gaelic, Irish, Scots, and English. He was a major contributing voice to the Scottish Renaissance.

== Early life ==
Neill was born in Prestwick, Ayrshire and educated at Ayr Academy. After service in the RAF, he studied at the University of Edinburgh and graduated with an Honours degree in Celtic studies. He was a frequent contributor to Catalyst and Gairm magazines and subsequently became the second editor of Catalyst. As a young writer, he studied the poets of the Scottish Renaissance, and viewed modern assertions that "Scots was dying in the time of Burns" as the assertions of dyed-in-the-wool townies.

== Career ==
Neill lived in Crossmichael in Kirkcudbrightshire, Galloway and taught English at Castle Douglas High School; his wife taught at the primary school. Occasionally he would sicken of teaching English and conduct lessons in Scots instead.

== Awards ==
The Gaelic poetry of William Neill took the National Mòd's bardic crown at Aviemore in 1969. Other awards for his poetry have included The Grierson Verse Prize (1970), Sloan Prize (1970) and a Scottish Arts Council Book Award (1985).

== Works ==
- Scotland's Castle, Reprographia (Gordon Wright), 1969
- Four Points of a Saltire, Reprographia (Gordon Wright), 1970
- Then and Now: poems and songs, W. Neill
- Poems, Akros Publications, 1970
- Despatches Home, Reprographia (Gordon Wright), 1972, ISBN 0-903065-07-X
- Wild Places: Poems in Three Leids, Luath Press, 1985
- Making Tracks: and other poems, Gordon Wright Publishing, 1988, ISBN 0-903065-65-7
- Straight Lines, Blackstaff Press, 1992, ISBN 0-856404756
- Tales frae the Odyssey o Homer, Saltire Society, 1992, ISBN 0-854110496
- Selected Poems, 1969-1992, Canongate Press, 1994, ISBN 978-0-86241-476-4
- A Hantle o Romanesco Sonnets bi Giuseppe Gioachino Belli (1791-1863), Burnside Press, 1995, ISBN 0-9527288-0-X
- Galloway Landscapes: poems, URR Publications, 1981, ISBN 978-0-9507609-0-2; Previous Parrot Press, 1997
- Caledonian Cramboclink, Luath Press, 2000, ISBN 978-0-946487-53-0

== Later life ==
He died in Munches Park Residential Home in Dalbeattie on 5 April 2010.

== See also ==
- Scotsoun
