= John Brunton (manufacturer) =

Scottish manufacturer and philanthropist (1837–1917)

John Brunton (1837–1917) was a Scottish manufacturer and philanthropist. The Brunton Theatre in Musselburgh is named after his family.

Owner of a large wireworks he was the creator of lenticular line, used for aircraft production. Originally called Bruntonised wire, due to inadequate patenting the creation was taken over by the Royal Aircraft Factory in 1912 and this streamlined (non-circular) wire was thereafter called RAF wire.

== Life ==
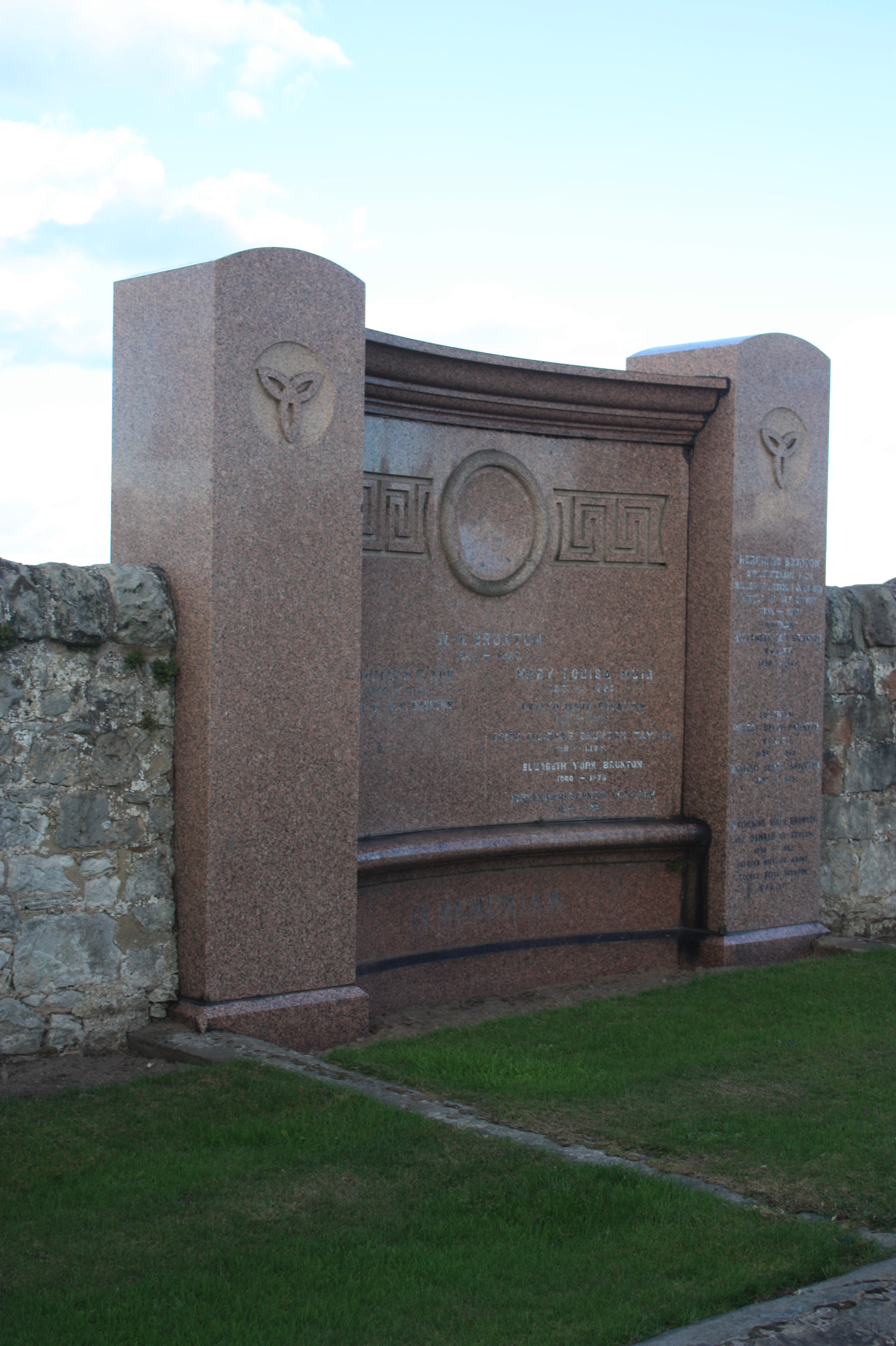
The Brunton family grave, Inveresk

He was born in East Lothian in 1837 and spent most of his life in Musselburgh.

In 1870 W. N. Brunton (either his father or older brother) opened "W. N. Brunton" a metalworks in Musselburgh known as the Seamill. It was one of the first British manufacturers to employ a high number of female workers.

In 1876 John opened the Brunton Wire Works in Musselburgh. The company made specialist wires such as piano wire. In 1888 they began making wire rope (mainly for shipping or dock use).

In 1909 he first created streamlined galvanised aircraft wire and offered it to the War Office. The War Office was impressed but effectively stole his idea, patenting it as "RAF Wire". However, they returned to Bruntons as the only factory capable of actually making the wire. The wires were originally made in Duraluminum but quickly changed to the more reliable steel.

Over and above aircraft wires, Brunton's wartime work included 100,000 rifle rods, field telephone wires, anti-submarine nets and bomb-proof nets for buildings. After the war the decline in need for wire brought diversification, with the company branching into spark plugs and cinema projectors.

In 1931 they took over the rival company George Elliot & Co.

John Brunton died in 1937. He is buried in Inveresk cemetery with his wife, who died in 1899. His name is written on the reverse of the large red granite monument and is only visible from the northern cemetery. The monument includes a stone bench on its south side.

His company still exists in the form of Brunton Aero Products on Inveresk Road in Musselburgh, and continues to supply specialist wires for aircraft use.

== Famous aircraft fitted with Brunton wires ==
- Vickers "Mayfly" (airship) (1910)
- R34 (airship) (1918)
- R100 (airship) (1922)
- R101 (airship) (1929)
- Alcock and Brown's Vickers Vimy (1918) the first plane to cross the Atlantic in 1919
- Handley Page bomber etc. (1915 onwards)
- Tiger Moth (1931)

Bruntons also supplied the hawsers for the Queen Mary in 1936.

== Family ==
The company was taken over by his son John Dixon Brunton (1872-1951). The latter left the family fortune of £700,000 to the town of Musselburgh, with which the Brunton Theatre was built.
