= Scotsoun =

Scottish audio archive

Scotsoun is an audio archive of works of Scottish literature, mainly of poetry in the Scots language.

The recordings were created over a period of thirty years by George Philp and Allan Ramsay and feature the voices of present poets in the language, such as William Neill, as well as audio readings, by poets and scholars, of a wide range of canonical texts, including extracts from Barbour and work of makars such as Henryson and Dunbar.

The archive is currently managed by the Scots Language Society.
