= South West Scotland =

Coordinates: 55°53′50″N 4°16′28″W

- Region
- South West Scotland in yellow
- Country: United Kingdom

Area
  - Total: 5,181 sq mi (13,419 km^{2})

Population (2019)
  - Total: 2,489,184
  - Density: 330/sq mi (128/km^{2})
- NUTS code: UKM3 (later UKM8 and UKM9)
- ITL code: TLM8 and TLM9

South West Scotland is one of the subdivisions of Scotland. Under the Nomenclature of Territorial Units for Statistics (NUTS), it was classified as a NUTS-2 statistical region. In the revised classification in 2016, the region was split into two statistical regions of West Central Scotland and Southern Scotland. Following Brexit, the regions were assigned under the new International Territorial Level codes in 2021. The region forms the south western part of the country, encompassing an area of 13,419 km^{2} (5,181 sq mi). It incorporates 13 of the 32 defined council areas including the city of Glasgow.

== Classification ==
Scotland is organized into 32 council areas for administrative purposes. The Nomenclature of Territorial Units for Statistics (NUTS) organized Scotland into four broader level subdivisions. These are classified as a NUTS-2 statistical regions, and incorporated various council areas within it. In 2016, the areas were re-classified, and South West Scotland was split into two NUTS-2 regions of West Central Scotland and Southern Scotland. Following Brexit, the regions were assigned under the new International Territorial Level codes in 2021.

== Geography ==
The region forms the south western part of the country, encompassing an area of 13,419 km^{2} (5,181 sq mi). It is situated in the north east of the main island of the United Kingdom, closer to Northern Ireland. It shares land borders with the Scottish highlands to the north, Eastern Scotland to the north-east and Northumberland, Tyne and Wear, and Cumbria regions of England to the south. It has the Atlantic Ocean to the west and North Sea to the east.

=== Sub-divisions ===
South West Scotland incorporates 13 of the 32 defined council areas including the city of Glasgow.

| Region | NUTS code | ITL code | Council areas | NUTS code | ITL code | Area | Population (2022) |
|---|---|---|---|---|---|---|---|
| West Central Scotland | UKM8 | TLM8 | East Dunbartonshire, and West Dunbartonshire | UKM81 | TLM81 | 751 km^{2} (290 sq mi) | 197,250 |
| West Central Scotland | UKM8 | TLM8 | Glasgow | UKM82 | TLM82 | 176 km^{2} (68 sq mi) | 622,820 |
| West Central Scotland | UKM8 | TLM8 | Inverclyde, East Renfrewshire, and Renfrewshire | UKM83 | TLM83 | 617 km^{2} (238 sq mi) | 359,840 |
| West Central Scotland | UKM8 | TLM8 | North Lanarkshire | UKM84 | TLM84 | 472 km^{2} (182 sq mi) | 340,930 |
| Southern Scotland | UKM9 | TLM9 | Dumfries and Galloway | UKM92 | TLM92 | 6,673 km^{2} (2,576 sq mi) | 145,770 |
| Southern Scotland | UKM9 | TLM9 | East and North Ayrshire mainland | UKM93 | TLM93 | 1,720 km^{2} (660 sq mi) | 253,880 |
| Southern Scotland | UKM9 | TLM9 | South Ayrshire | UKM94 | TLM94 | 1,235 km^{2} (477 sq mi) | 111,560 |
| Southern Scotland | UKM9 | TLM9 | South Lanarkshire | UKM95 | TLM95 | 1,774 km^{2} (685 sq mi) | 327,430 |
