= Robert Silver =

Scottish physicist and mechanical engineer

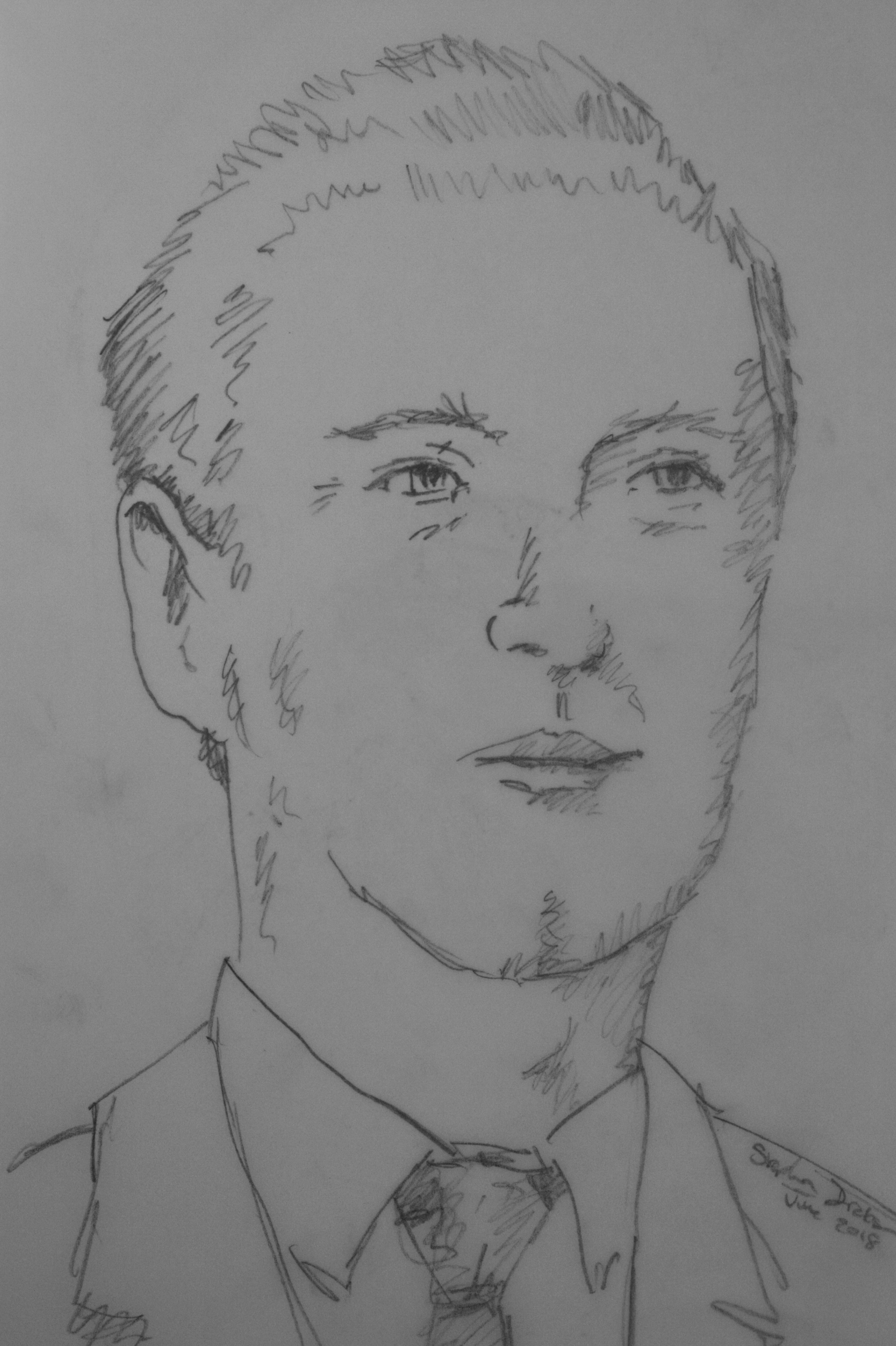
Robert Simpson Silver

Robert Simpson Silver CBE, MA, Ph.D, D.Sc., D.Tech, F.I.Mech.E, F.Inst.P, FRSE (1913–1997) was a Scottish physicist and mechanical engineer, awarded the Unesco Prize for Science in 1968 for his discovery of a process for the demineralisation of sea water. Prior to his work there had been no commercially viable desalination process that involved continuous flow; plants had to be stopped and emptied of accumulated salt from time to time, such as when a passenger liner using desalination was in port. Silver performed a thermodynamic analysis (now known as "Second Law Analysis") showing that reverse osmosis and "multi-stage flash" were the optimal processes for purification of water. As reverse osmosis technology was less advanced in the mid-20th century he designed multi-stage flash equipment, of which the first operational large-scale installation was in Kuwait.

== Early life ==
He was born in Montrose, Angus on 13 March 1913 the son of Alexander Clark Silver and his wife, Isabella Simpson. He was educated at Montrose Academy.

He studied Natural Philosophy (Physics) at Glasgow University graduating MA in 1932, BSc (1st class honours) in 1934 and gaining his doctorate (PhD) in 1938 for studies in gaseous combustion and subsequently was awarded a D.Sc in 1945 for further research work whilst in Industry.

== Career ==
From 1936 to 1962 he worked in Industrial Research and Design. His first post (1936 to 1939) was in ICI's Explosives Division. For the duration of the Second World War he was Head of Research for G & J Weir in Glasgow. Here he became an expert in desalination whilst working with the Admiralty. After the war he worked consecutively for the Gas Research Board, Federated Foundries Ltd, John Brown Land Boilers Ltd then back to G & J Weir in 1956 as Chief of Research and Development and becoming Director in 1958.

After the Second World War, he worked to redesign coal-burning fireplaces which were used in most homes and offices across the United Kingdom. His analysis of the heat balance of these fireplaces resulted in new designs that saved tons of coal and helped reduce air pollution.

Silver redesigned the marine distillers and developed the Multi-Stage Flash desalination process without which arid countries such as in the Middle East would have inadequate water supplies to this day. He gained international stature and recognition from his role as the father of the modern desalination industry. Due to his work it is now practical to build desalination units far more efficient in energy consumption, and 15 times larger in capacity, than was possible before his developments.

In 1962 he moved to academia and became Professor of Mechanical Engineering at Heriot-Watt University.

In 1963, he received the Heat Transfer Memorial Award from the American Society of Mechanical Engineers.

In 1964 he was elected a Fellow of the Royal Society of Edinburgh. His proposers were Hugh Bryan Nisbet, John Ronald Peddie, Frank Bell and William Harold Joseph Childs.

In 1967 he moved to Glasgow University to take up the James Watt Chair of Mechanical Engineering and Thermodynamics. He retired in 1979.

In 1967 he was awarded a CBE.

For his contribution to desalination Silver was awarded the UNESCO Science Prize in 1968, the first ever awarded.

In 1980 he was elected a foreign associate of the US National Academy of Engineering.

In 1982 he won the Water Supply Improvement Association's Lifetime Achievement Award for his work bringing clean water to many arid countries.

== Personal life ==
In 1937 he married Jean McIntyre Bruce (d.1988) and they had two sons.

He was passionate about Scottish language and literature not only of the Doric tradition of the North East, but also of Gaelic. He was a poet and a playwright. His play 'The Bruce' was published by the Saltire Society in 1986 subsequently broadcast by the BBC Radio and put on at the Edinburgh Festival. A one-act play 'The Picture' was put on in London and is still popular with many amateur companies. A collection of his poems 'Conflict and Context' has been published by Chapman magazine. He was a prodigious writer to the newspapers and his thoughts on a wide range of topics could be seen regularly appearing in the letters columns of Scotland's national press.

Silver was an ardent Scottish Nationalist standing for the SNP as a candidate in the 1979 election in the Craigton constituency of Glasgow in the 1979 General Election.

He died on 21 April 1997.

== Published works ==
'An Introduction to Thermodynamics - with Some New Derivations Based on Real Irreversible Processes'. May 1971 ISBN 9780521080644

'Steam Plant Aspects of Sea Water Distillation'. July 1978 ISBN 9780852983850

'Conflicts and Contexts': Selected Poems of the Quarter Century. Feb 1992 ISBN 9780906772416
