= Agnes Grozier Herbertson =

Scottish writer and poet

Drawing of Herbertson in The Evening Telegraph, 1906

Agnes Grozier Herbertson (c. 1875 – 1958) was a Scottish writer and poet who later lived in Cornwall, United Kingdom.

Herbertson was born in Oslo circa 1875 to a Scots family and privately educated. She grew up in Glasgow, and later moved to Oxford and then Cornwall, where she lived with her sister Jessie Leckie Herbertson.

Herbertson began publishing shortly after her teens, writing several fairy tales for The People's Friend circa 1895. Later works included short stories for periodicals including The Windsor Magazine, Chambers’s Edinburgh Journal, and Little Folks Magazine, where her stories included "romantic fairy tale" "The Hop-About Man". Herbertson's novels include The Plowers (1906), about a woman whose scientist husband conducts inhuman experiments, and The Ship That Came Home in the Dark, about a woman who tries to take the place of a blind man's wife. In a 1919 book of poems, The Quiet Heart, Herbertson addresses topics including World War I; her poem "Disabled" is narrated by a wounded soldier who seeks comfort in nature. Another poem, "The Seed-Merchant's Son", centers on a father whose son died in war.

Herbertson died in 1958.

== Partial bibliography ==
Be-By and The Things He Did, 1910 book by Herbertson (J. R. Monsell, illust)

Tinkler Johnny, 1916 book by Herbertson, illustrations by Florence Harrison

- A Book without a Man! (1897)
- The Spindle Tree (1900)
- The Pilgrim's Progress (1900)
- The Bee-Blowaways (1900)
- The Plowers: A Novel (1906)
- Heroic Legends (1907)
- How Wry-Face Played a Trick on One-Eye (1908)
- Gulliver's Travels (1908)
- Cap-o'- Yellow and Other Stories for Children (1908)
- Be-By and The Things He Did (1910)
- The Ship That Came Home in the Dark (1912)
- Tinkler Johnny (1916)
- The Quiet Heart and Other Poems (1919)
- The Dolly Book (1920)
- The Adventures of Be-Wee the Gnome (1921)
- Sing-Song Stories (1922)
- The Needle-Witch's Pepper-Pot (1922)
- The Book of Happy Gnomes (1924)
- Cottons and Cookery: A Comedy for Girls' (1926)
- Bob-Along The Brownie Man (1950)
- The Cherry Cobbler (1958)
- Pip-Pip's Exciting Day (1960, posthumous)
