= Alexander Reid (playwright) =

Scottish journalist, playwright and poet

- Born: August 19, 1914; Edinburgh
- Died: July 1, 1982
- Education: George Heriot's School, Edinburgh
- Occupations: journalist, playwright
- Writing career
- Language: Scots
- Genre: drama
- Notable work: The Lass wi' the Muckle Mou (1950)
- Movement: Scottish Renaissance

Alexander Reid (1914–1982) was a Scottish journalist, playwright and poet, "one of the neglected dramatists of the Scottish Renaissance". His two best-known plays are The Lass wi' the Muckle Mou (1950), based on the legend of Thomas the Rhymer and The Warld's Wonder (1953), about Michael Scot, the famous magician.

== Life ==
Alexander Reid was born on 19 August 1914 in Edinburgh, and educated at George Heriot's School. From 1929 to 1936 he worked as a journalist for the Edinburgh Evening News, before writing on Scottish history and literature for the SMT Magazine. In 1938, he contributed an article on the General Post Office Pavilion at the Empire Exhibition in Glasgow to the Scottish Field. A conscientious objector during World War II, he worked as a bookseller and accountant before becoming a full-time writer and broadcaster in 1948.

His first play, World Without End (1946), was a contemporary piece about nuclear holocaust, but he is now best remembered for his period plays in Scots. The Lass wi' the Muckle Mou was first performed at the Glasgow Citizens' Theatre in November 1950. It was adapted as a television drama, first broadcast by the BBC on Tuesday 6 October 1953, and was staged again by Edinburgh's Gateway Theatre Company during its 1954–55 season. The Warld's Wonder was produced at the Gateway in the autumn of 1958.

Reid's short stories include The Kitten and A Warm Golden Brown.

Reid edited the Saltire Society's quarterly Saltire Review from 1954 until 1960. He died in Edinburgh on 1 July 1982.

== Published works ==
- Steps to a Viewpoint, 1947
- Zoo-illogical Rhymes, 1947
- The Milky Way, 1956
- Kirk and Drama, 1957
- Two Scots Plays (The Lass wi' the Muckle Mou and The Warld's Wonder), 1958
- The Young Traveller in France, 1963

== Other plays ==
- World Without End, 1946
- The Wax Doll, 1956
- Voyage Ashore, 1956
