= Scots Language Society =

The Scots Language Society, or Scots Leid Associe, also formerly known as the Lallans Society, is a body that works for the promotion of the Scots language "in literature, drama, the media, education and everyday use". It was founded in 1972 and has an open membership.

The SLS publishes a bi-annual journal, Lallans, which has developed over the years from a small pamphlet-sized organ to a 144-page magazine with prose, poetry, reviews, news and articles relevant to the language, all in Scots. Lallans is posted free to members of the Society, and is estimated to have a readership of around a thousand, including through its library distribution. In 2022 the society published an anthology of poems collected in the journal from 1973 to 2022, for which it received funding from the Scots Language Publication Grant.

SLS also holds an Annual Collogue ('Annual Meeting'), normally a day-long event in the summer featuring awards for writing in Scots, readings, talks and music.

The SLS sees itself as part of a 'family' of Scots language organisations, including among others the Scots Leid Cross-Pairty Group at the Scottish Parliament and the Scots Language Centre in Perth.
