= The Merry Muses of Caledonia =

Collection of bawdy songs by Robert Burns

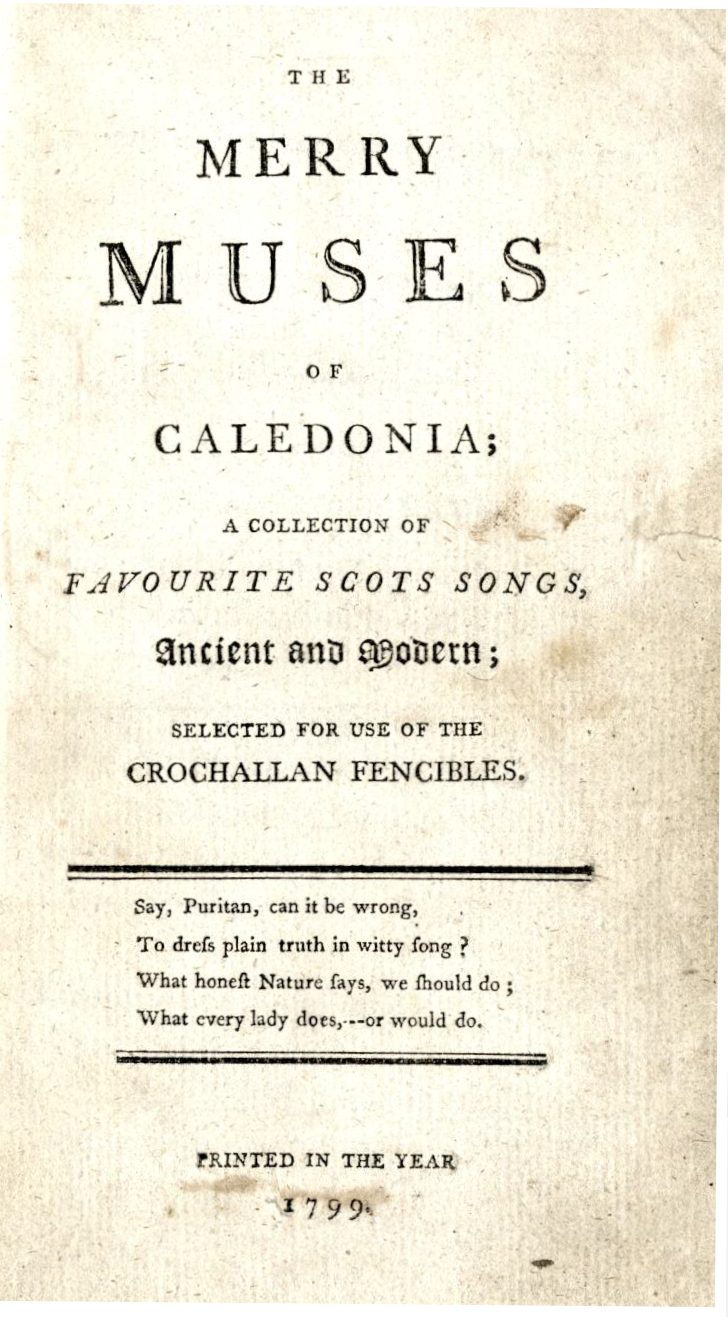
Merry Muses of Caledonia 1799 from The G Ross Roy Collection

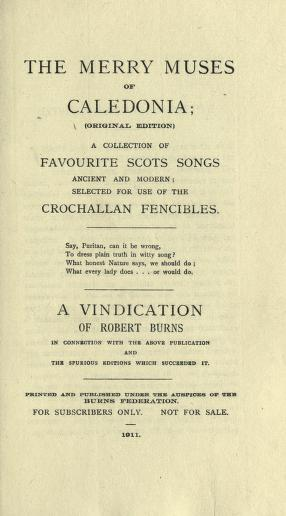
Title Page of The Merry Muses of Caledonia published by The Burns Federation in 1911

The Merry Muses of Caledonia is a collection of bawdy songs said to have been collected or written by Robert Burns, the 18th-century Scottish poet.

== Original text ==
The poems and songs were collected for the private use of Robert Burns and his friends, including the Crochallan Fencibles, an 18th-century Edinburgh club, which met at the Anchor Close, a public house off the High Street. Robert Burns was introduced to the club by William Smellie, while setting the Edinburgh edition of Poems, Chiefly in the Scottish Dialect (Edinburgh Edition) in his shop in the same close. The songs in the collection were intended to be performed in a "convivial" atmosphere.

Discussion as to the provenance and compilation of the original text is ongoing. The original printer is unknown, but is agreed that it was first intended for the use of the Crochallan Fencibles. It has been suggested that the printer may have been Alexander Smellie, the son of Burns's friend and founder Crochallan Fencible William Smellie (1740–95), or another fencible, Peter Hill. It was published three years after the death of Burns, in 1799, and was not attributed to him. The original manuscript is no longer extant.

Two copies of the original are supposed to be extant. One is often named the 'Rosebery copy', and the other is in the G. Ross Roy Collection of Burnsiana & Scottish Literature at the University of South Carolina.

The former was, by 1959, in the collection of Harry Primrose, 6th Earl of Rosebery. It is damaged and has no printing date on the title page, although examination of the paper's Watermark has indicated a printing date of 1799. A microform copy is available in the National Library of Scotland.

The latter is the only one with a complete title page, containing the following epigraph.

Say, Puritan, can it be wrong,

To dress plain truth in witty song?

What honest Nature says, we should do;

What every lady does, - or would do.

== Editions ==
The text has gone through a number of editions, which vary in their content.

The edition printed after the initial publication was printed in Dublin, around 1804. It was entitled The merry muses : a choice collection of favourite songs.

The "Giblet Pye" collection, printed in 1806, contained songs and poems from The Merry Muses as well as other ballads.

in 1823, The Songs and Ballads of Robert Burns, including Ten never before published, with a Preliminary Discourse and Illustrative Prefaces was printed in London, containing ten songs from The Merry Muses.

The '1827' is said to have been published in 1872 for John Hotten in London, with the numerals of the publication date reversed, which may have been done deliberately to confuse censors.

In 1911 an edition was printed by the Burns Federation. The title page reads: The Merry Muses of Caledonia; A Collection of Favourite Scots Songs Ancient and Modern; Selected for Use of the Crochallan Fencibles. It also includes an essay, entitled A Vindication of Robert Burns in connection with the above publication and the spurious editions which succeeded it. This edition had a moral tone, and intended to challenge the collection's notoriety, and its identification as pornography. It also attempted to identify the authorship of some of the poems.

A further edition of the poems was published in 1959, the title page reading: edited by James Barke and Sydney Goodsir Smith, with a Prefatory Note and some authentic Burns Texts contributed by John DeLancey Ferguson. Like the 1911 edition, this one contextualised the poems. The Merry Muses was intended to be accompanied by music, and this 1959 edition was intended to include music. Unfortunately, it was left incomplete owing to the death of Barke.

A 1965 edition: The Merry Muses of Caledonia. Collected and in part written by Robert Burns was edited by G Legman.

In 2009, Luath Press published an edition with an additional essay by Valentina Bold and illustrations by satirist Bob Dewar.

== Performance ==
- Ewan MacColl Songs from Robert Burns's Merry Muses of Caledonia. Sung by Ewan MacColl. Edited and annotated by Kenneth S. Goldstein. Dionysus, 1962
- Gill Bowman, Tich Frier et al. Robert Burns - The Merry Muse. Glasgow: Iona Records, 1996
- Jean Redpath. Songs of Robert Burns. Arranged by Serge Hovey, 7 volumes. First published 1976-1990
- Robert Burns. The Complete Songs. 12 vols. Various artists. Ed. Fred Freeman (Glasgow: Linn Records, 1995–2002)
