= David Herd (anthologist) =

Scottish anthologist of songs (1732–1810)

David Herd (1732 – 10 June 1810) was a Scottish anthologist of songs and ballads.

== Biography ==
Herd was born in Balmakelly in the parish of Marykirk in Kincardineshire in 1732 to Margaret Herd (née Low) (1691–1751) and John Herd, a farmer. The child David was baptised on 23 October 1732. Later in life he became clerk to an accountant in Edinburgh, where he became a well-known figure among the literary men. He devoted his leisure to collecting old Scottish poems and songs. In 1769 he published his first compilation of nearly 60 'heroic ballads' and 300 songs as Ancient Scottish Songs, Heroic Ballads, etc. Later enlarged editions appeared in 1776 and 1791.

Herd was a member and Sovereign (president) of the Edinburgh Cape Club, a tavern based convivial society with members including the poet Robert Fergusson, the painters Alexander Nasmyth, Henry Raeburn and Alexander Runciman (a close friend of Herd's), as well as John Wotherspoon (the printer of Herd's book) and Deacon William Brodie. Herd was also friendly with Sir Walter Scott, who made use of Herd's manuscript collections in his collection of ballads, the Minstrelsy of the Scottish Border.

Herd died at Potterrow, Edinburgh on 10 June 1810 and was buried in the Buccleuch Parish Church yard.
