= Scottish music (1960–1969) =

== Births and deaths ==
- Savourna Stevenson (born 1961)

== Recordings ==
- 1960 "Singing The Fishing" (Ewan MacColl)
- 1961 "Scottish Choice" (The Galliards)
- 1962 "The Body Blow" (Ewan MacColl)
- 1963 "On The Edge" (Ewan MacColl)
- 1964 "The Travelling People" (Ewan MacColl)
- 1964 "Scottish Ballad Book" (Jean Redpath)
- 1965 "Corrie Folk Trio" (The Corries)
- 1966 "Those Wild Corries" (The Corries)
- 1966 "Mirrormans Sequences" (Robin Williamson)
- 1967 "Bonnet Belt and Sword" (The Corries)
- 1967 "Before And After" (Hamish Imlach)
- 1968 "The Hangman's Beautiful Daughter" (Incredible String Band)
- 1968 "Kishmul's Galley" (The Corries)
- 1969 "Scottish Love Songs" (The Corries)
- 1969 "The Fate o' Charlie" (Barbara Dickson and Archie Fisher)
