= Solati Trio =

Classical music ensemble

The Solati Trio is a Rhode Island–based classical music ensemble. The trio—Ludmilla Lifson (piano), Sophia Herman (violin), and Hrant Tatian (cello)—was formed in 1984 and has premiered many works by contemporary composers which were written for and dedicated to the ensemble.

== History ==
The Solati Trio was formed out of the Herman-Lifson Duo, the first prize recipients of the Soviet Chamber Music Competition in 1966. Pianist Ludmilla Lifson and violinist Sophia Herman, twin sisters formerly known as Ludmilla and Sophia Drexler, received Leningrad state management as a result of their win. Under state management, the duo toured Russia and made radio and television appearances. In 1978 the duo moved their careers to the United States and joined forces with cellist Hrant Tatian to become the Solati Trio in 1984.

== Members ==
Pianist Ludmilla Lifson graduated from the Leningrad Conservatory in 1968. She studied primarily with Moisej Halfin, a student of Leonid Nikolayev. Upon graduation she joined the faculty at the Leningrad Conservatory. She taught there for ten years before moving to the United States in 1978. In 1979, Lifson joined the faculty at the Longy School of Music of Bard College. In 2013, Ludmilla Lifson died due to complications with brain cancer.

Violinist Sophia Herman also graduated from the Leningrad Conservatory in 1968. Her primary teacher was Mikhail Vaiman, a member of the School of Stolyarsky. In 1969, Herman was appointed to a first violin position with the Saint Petersburg Philharmonic Orchestra (then called the Leningrad Philharmonic), which she held until 1974. She currently performs with the Rhode Island Philharmonic Orchestra. She plays a 1747 Januarius Gagliano violin.

Cellist Hrant Tatian completed his studies with Leonard Rose at the Juilliard School of Music. He appeared as Principal Cellist of the Rochester Philharmonic Orchestra and as Assistant Principal Cellist of the St. Louis Symphony. Tatian founded and performed in numerous award-winning chamber groups. He plays a 1786 Ferdinand Gagliano cello.

== Honors and awards ==
- The Solati Trio was awarded first prize in the strings category of the 1985 Shoreline Alliance Chamber Music Competition in Guilford, Connecticut. As a result, the trio was invited to appear live on WGBH (FM) Morning Pro Musica program in Boston.
- The Trio was selected to represent the state of Rhode Island in concert at the John F. Kennedy Center in honor of the twenty-fifth anniversary of the center.

== Notable appearances and premieres ==
The trio has appeared at notable New England venues including the Isabella Stewart Gardner Museum, Mechanics Hall (Worcester, Massachusetts), and Jordan Hall, as well as prominent venues within the broader United States including the John F. Kennedy Center for the Performing Arts and Carnegie Hall. The trio has been featured at institutions including Harvard University, Brown University, Deerfield Academy, and Washington and Lee University. The trio sponsors a concert series in the New England area.

The trio performed and recorded world premieres by composer William Thomas McKinley with the Moravian Philharmonic in the Czech Republic. The trio was invited back to tour throughout the country. The final portion of the tour took place at the Martinu Hall in Prague. Again performing world premieres, Trio Solati was recorded in Bratislava, Slovakia with the Slovak Radio Symphony Orchestra.

Being Master Musicians Collective or MMC artists, the Solati Trio has had many compositions written for and dedicated to them by MMC composers including William Thomas McKinley, Greg Bullen, Peter Kelly, Romeo Melloni, John Hojnacki, Elaine Ericson, and Greg Naeger.

One of the most notable premieres was a performance of William Thomas McKinley's Triple Concerto for Trio and Orchestra entitled Again Silent Whispers, which the trio performed and recorded in the Czech Republic with the Moravian Philharmonic.

Another notable premiere was a triple concerto, written by composer Gamma Skupinsky and recorded in Bratislava, Slovakia, with the Radio Orchestra.

== Festivals and residencies ==
In 2006, the Solati Trio was invited to participate in one of the largest classical music festivals in South America, the XII Rio International Cello Encounter in Rio de Janeiro, Brazil. The festival consisted of two weeks of performances and Master Classes.

The Trio also served as Artists-In-Residence at Washington and Lee University for two weeks. The residency included coachings, Masterclasses and concerts.

== Recordings ==
- Music For Orchestra – Neva Pilgrim (soprano), Solati Trio, Slovak Radio Symphony Orchestra, Robert Black and Robert Stankovsky (conductors). 1995. Label: MMC Recordings
- Solati Trio: Piano Trios 1 (Works by William Thomas McKinley, Romeo Melloni, Gregory Bullen, and Dmitri Shostakovich) Solati Trio. 1999. MMC Recordings
- Solati Trio: Piano Trios 2 (Works by Tchaikovsky, LeClair, and Mathias)
- Again Silent Whispers (Mckinley Triple Concerto for Trio and Orchestra)
