= John Collett (composer) =

18th Century British violinist and composer

John Collett (c1735-1775) was an English violinist and composer. He is credited with composing the first British four movement symphony.

Little is known of Collett's life. He may have been the son of Richard Collett or Thomas Collett, both members of the Royal Society of Musicians from 1739. John Collett was a violinist at both Vauxhall Gardens and the Foundling Hospital. He joined the Royal Society of Musicians in June 1757, when he was living in Queen's Street, Golden Square in London. He later moved to Aberdeen, Scotland and then Edinburgh, where he remained for the rest of his life. There he was associated with the Edinburgh Musical Society and became a member of the Cape Club. He set fellow Cape Club member Robert Fergusson's words to a cantata, Ode on the Rivers of Scotland (1772, now lost). Another substantial cantata, The Birthday Cantata for Andrew Crosbie, was composed in Edinburgh the following year, and has survived.

His Six Solos for the Violin (with harpsichord thoroughbass) were published around 1758. He wrote pantomime theatre music for David Garrick's The Hermit (at Drury Lane in 1766), and songs for the Vauxhall pleasure gardens. His Six Symphonies or Overtures, op. 2, dedicated to Thomas Earl of Kelly, were published in 1766, and like Kelly's symphonies they reflect the Mannheim Style popular at the time. Number 3, originally the overture to the burletta Midas, presented at Covent Garden in February 1764, became well known. There is a modern recording of Number 5, the first British four-movement symphony to follow the form established by Stamitz, founder of the Mannheim School.
