= G. F. Maine =

Scottish author and editor

- Born: George Frederick Maine c. 1894
- Died: 19 February 1956; Glasgow, Scotland
- Occupation: Editor
- Writing career
- Period: 1947–1977
- Subjects: British Literature; Theology
- Notable work: A Book of Scotland

George Frederick Maine (c.1894 – 19 February 1956) was a Scottish author and editor.

Most of his work was leather-bound, and published by Collins.

Maine died in Glasgow on 19 February 1956 at the age of 62.

== Author ==
- A Book of Scotland (1950, 51, 53, 56, 59, 62, 65, 68, 69, 81)
  ISBN 0-904002-67-5
- A Book of Daily Readings: Passages in prose and verse for solace and meditation (1953, 1990)
- The Life and Teachings of the Master (1953)
- The Life and Teachings of Christ (1953, 1970)
- Great Thoughts Birthday Book (1977)

== Editor ==
Title	Author	Introduction	Publication Dates
Songs from Robert Burns 1759–1796	Robert Burns	G. F. Maine	1947, 1967, 1973
My Lady of the Chimney Corner	Alexander H. Irvine		1948, 1966
A Shakespeare Anthology	William Shakespeare	G. F. Maine	1948, 1964, 1995
The Works of Oscar Wilde	Oscar Wilde	G. F. Maine	1949,50,52,54,57,61
Kenilworth	Sir Walter Scott	Sir H.J.C. Grierson	1952
Northanger Abbey / Persuasion	Jane Austen		1953
The Expedition of Humphry Clinker (Collins Classics, 632)	Tobias Smollett	V. S. Pritchett	1954
Poems and Songs of Robert Burns	Robert Burns	James Barke	1955
The Imitation of Christ	Thomas à Kempis	G. F. Maine	1955
The Life of the Buddha	L. Adams Beck	G. F. Maine	1957
New Gem Dictionary	Anne Scott		1959
Collins Little Gem Dictionary (Latin-English, English-Latin)	D. A. Kidd		1964
The Greatest Thing in the World and 21 other Addresses	Henry Drummond	J. Y. Simpson	1966
Italian (Collins' Pocket Interpreters)	Isopel May		1966
Tennyson Birthday Book	Alfred Tennyson		1967
Essays and Poems	Ralph Waldo Emerson	Delancey Ferguson	1967, 1997
The Complete Works of Shakespeare: Volume I, Comedies; Volume II, Histories; Volume III, Tragedies; Volume IV, Tragedies & Poems	William Shakespeare		1968, 1969
Dombey and Son	Charles Dickens	Mark Whyte	1974
Villette	Charlotte Brontë	Phyllis Bentley	1975
Lorna Doone	R. D. Blackmore	L. A. G. Strong	1977
Jane Eyre	Charlotte Brontë	Bonamy Dobrée	1977
