= Crochallan Fencibles =

Irish 18th-century convivial men's club

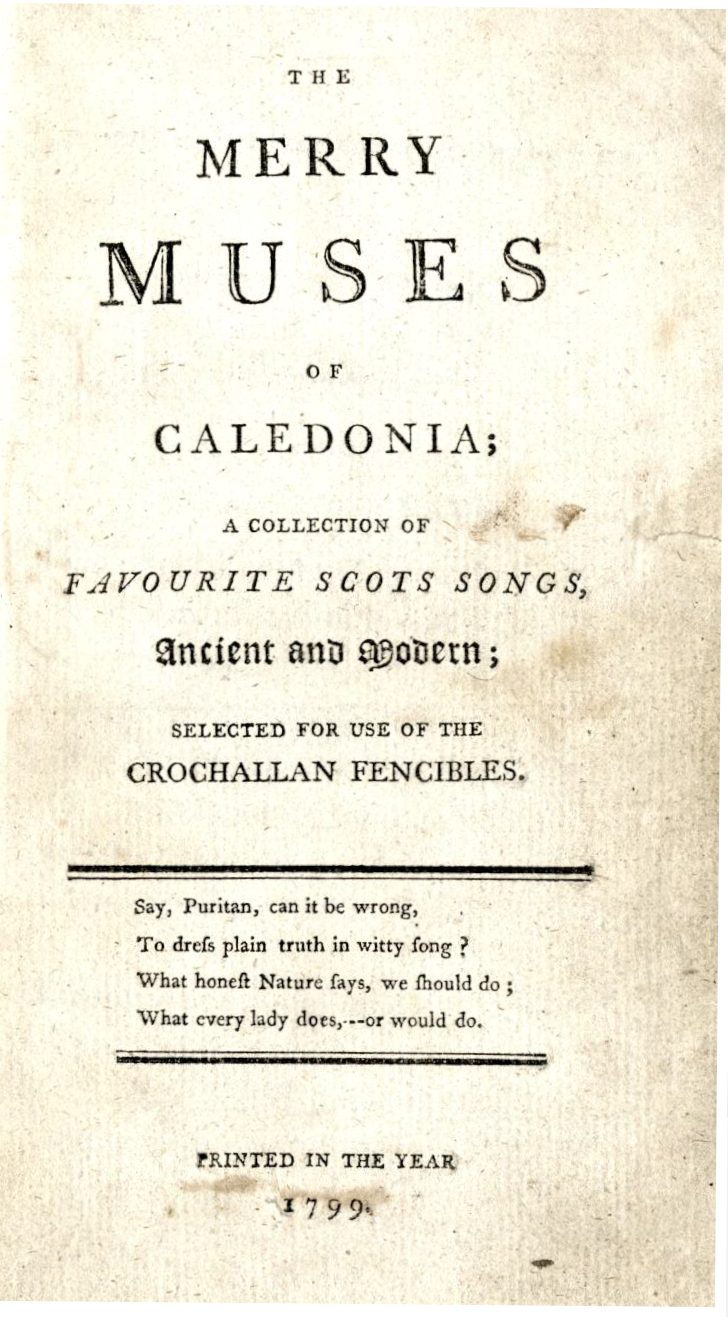
Merry Muses of Caledonia 1799 from The G Ross Roy Collection

The Crochallan Fencibles was an 18th-century Edinburgh convivial men's club that met in Daniel ("Dawney") Douglas's tavern on Anchor Close, a public house off the High Street (part of the Royal Mile). The 16th century doorway bore the inscription "O Lord In The(e) is All My Traist (trust)".

== History ==
Its name was made up from two sources: Crochallan is derived from a song, "Crodh Chailein'" ("Colin's Cattle"), which was a favourite of the then Landlord Daniel Douglas, and Fencibles was a name for regiments of garrison troops which were raised for the defence of Great Britain (an 18th-century Home Guard).

William Smellie, the editor of the first edition of the Encyclopædia Britannica, was the founder of the club. He reminisced that:

I wrote most of it, my lad, and snipped out from books enough material for the printer. With pastepot and scissors I composed it!

— William Smellie, at a meeting of the Crochallan Fencibles.

The members of the club use military ranks to designate their positions in the club (as if it were a real fencible regiment), hence William Dunbar (died 1807) was the colonel of the club (rather than its chairman or president).

Smellie introduced Robert Burns to the club in 1787. Burns compiled a book of popular songs for the club called The Merry Muses of Caledonia in which he writes of Smellie:

And, though his caustic wit was biting rude,
His heart was warm, benevolent, and good.

Other members included Alexander Irving, Lord Newton and Adam Gillies, Lord Gillies.

Dawney's Tavern was demolished in 1869.

== See also ==
- Edinburgh Cape Club
- The Poker Club
