= Edinburgh Cape Club =

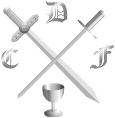
Cape Logo, watchwords Concordia fratrum decus

The Edinburgh Cape Society is a convivial Edinburgh tavern-based society which was first established in the 18th century. It is one of many Convivial Edinburgh Societies which were extant in the 18th century, but the only (known) one which survives to the present day.

It was founded initially to support a Scottish Militia.

It is known mostly for its connections to the poet Robert Fergusson.

== The original Edinburgh Cape Club ==
The club was founded in the early 1700s, but was not formally constituted until 1764. Its main meeting place was then The Isle of Man Arms, run by a James Mann, in the middle of Craigs Close in the Old Town of Edinburgh. It met on a nightly basis, where "high jinks" would ensue.

Its insignia were a cape, or crown, worn by the Sovereign of the Cape, and two maces in the form of huge steel pokers (which can still be seen the National Museum of Scotland).

The comedian Tom Lancashire was the first Sovereign of the club in 1764, as Sir Cape – all members took a Knights pseudonym upon joining – whilst the title of Sir Poker was taken by its oldest member, at that time James Aitken.

David Herd (a collector of Scottish Ballad Poetry) succeeded Lancashire as Sovereign and took the pseudonym Sir Scrape. The Knight Recorder (Club Secretary) of this time was Jacob More, the Scottish Landscape Painter.

When a Knight of the Cape was inaugurated he was led forward by his sponsors, and kneeling before the Sovereign, had to grasp the poker and take an oath of fidelity, while all Knights stood with Pokers raised to acknowledge acceptance:

I devoutly swear by this light,

To be a true and faithful knight, With all my might, Both Day and night,

So help me Poker!

Among the more famous members of the original Cape were Deacon William Brodie (the inspiration behind Robert Louis Stevenson's "Dr. Jekyll and Mr. Hyde") and painters Alexander Runciman and Sir Henry Raeburn. The composer John Collett was also a member.

The entrance fee to the club was originally half-a-crown, but eventually it rose to a guinea, but so economical were its members, that among the last entries in the minutes of this time was one to the effect that suppers should be at "the old price of 4 and a half Pennies a head".

== Robert Fergusson and The Cape Club ==
Fergusson joined the Cape Club in October 1772.

Delighting in its quasi-masonic rituals, Fergusson took on the nickname 'Sir Precenter', and hymned the Cape's exploits. A drawing of him is thought to survive in the Club's Minute Book (National Library of Scotland). At the Cape he mixed with ordinary tradesmen as well as with artistic figures such as David Herd and Alexander Runciman, who painted Fergusson's portrait, now in the Scottish National Portrait Gallery, and to whom Fergusson addressed some comic verses.

Fergusson also wrote the Poem "Auld Reekie", which he dedicated to his fellow Knights of The Cape.

On 2 July 1774 the Cape Club took up a collection to aid Fergusson after the onset of his illness. He died on 17 October 1774, and was buried on 19 October in the Canongate Kirkyard.

== Present day Edinburgh Cape Society ==
The Edinburgh Cape Society was reconstituted in the 1960s, following the research of James Grubb, who became The Cape Society's first Sovereign after reconstitution, a.k.a. Sir Dun Eiden. To this day, the Society holds its monthly meetings in Edinburgh.

== See also ==
- The Poker Club
- Crochallan Fencibles
