= Edinburgh Wax Museum =

Former Scottish museum

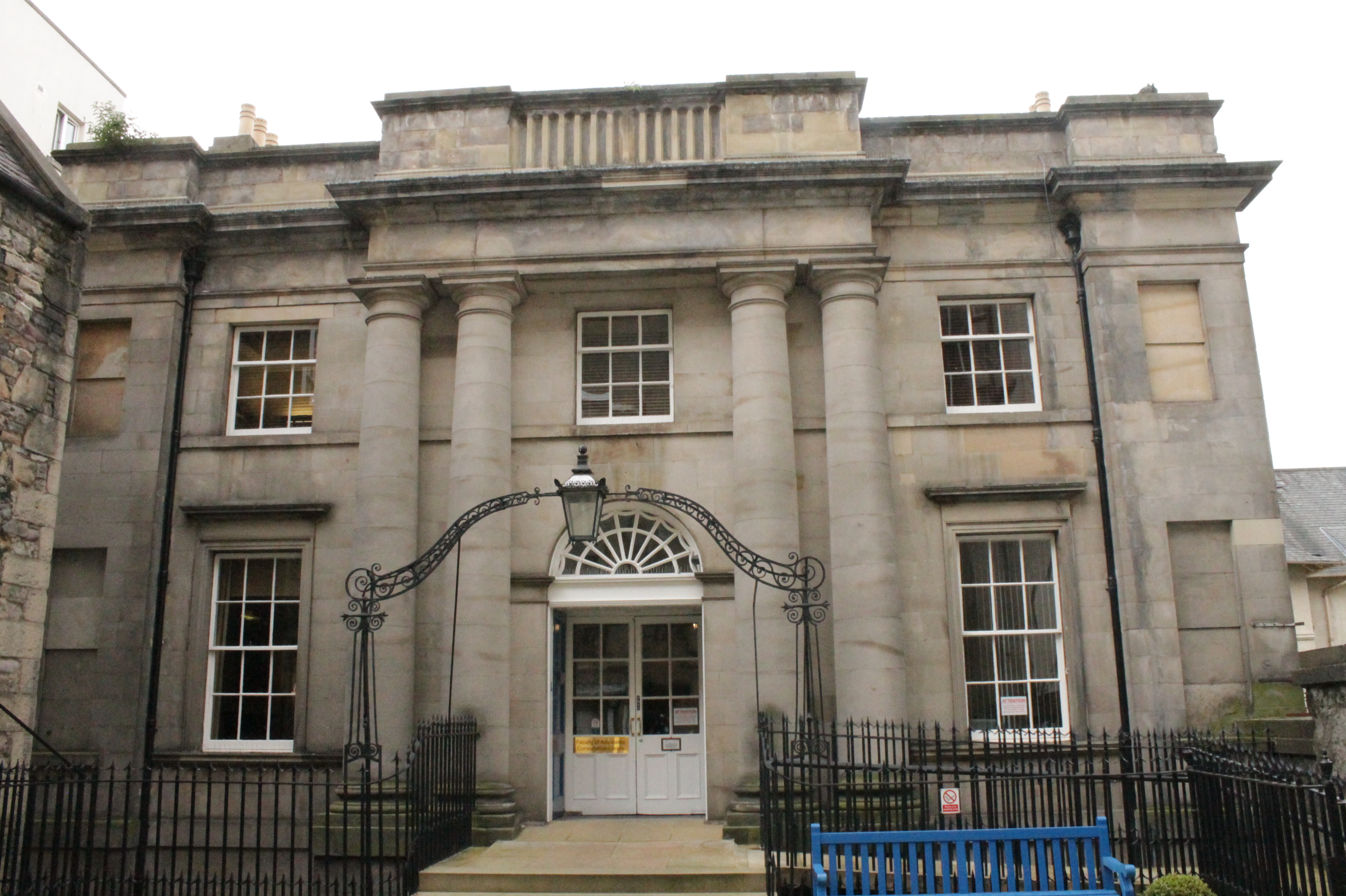
Edinburgh Wax Museum, New Assembly Close, Edinburgh

Edinburgh Wax Museum was a short-lived but important tourist attraction on the Royal Mile in the late 20th century. At its peak it was attended by 230,000 visitors per year, making it one of the main attractions in Edinburgh.

It was the only waxworks in Scotland and focused on the heroes of Scottish history, containing over 150 figures in total.

== History ==
In 1976 an entrepreneur called Charles Cameron acquired an impressive Georgian building sitting on New Assembly Close off the Royal Mile between St Giles' Cathedral and the Tron Kirk, accessed via a narrow close. It had been built in 1813 as the Commercial Bank, designed by James Gillespie Graham, replacing the New Assembly Rooms of 1766. It was one of the few survivors of the Great Fire of Edinburgh in 1824 which destroyed most surrounding buildings. A secondary function was accommodated in the evenings: the Castle Dracula Theatre starring Cameron as Count Dracula in his Gothic House of Terror. The physical conversion o the building was undertaken by the Edinburgh architect John Carlyle Hope.

Wax faces were made by Winifred Mills. The children's section was called Never Never Land.

The museum closed in March 1989 and was converted into legal offices.

Many of the exhibits were purchased by a property firm. Some rematerialised in a small wax museum in farm buildings. Some were taken by the Whisky Heritage Museum

Since 2008 there have been efforts to reopen the museum.

The building is now known as the Lord Reid Building and forms part of the Faculty of Advocates.

== Exhibits ==
(taken from contemporary guide books)

=== Original figures ===
William Wallace, Robert the Bruce, Robert Burns, Mary Queen of Scots, Elizabeth I, James VI, Queen Elizabeth II and Prince Philip, Princess Anne and her husband Captain Mark Phillips, Thomas Carlyle and his wife Jane Welsh Carlyle, Sir Walter Scott, Sir Henry Raeburn, Adam Smith, Robert Adam, Lord Byron, Lord Cockburn, John Loudon McAdam, David Hume, James Watt, Thomas Telford, John Buchan, J. M. Barrie, Robert Louis Stevenson, St. Margaret of Scotland, John Knox, James Graham, Marquis of Montrose, Sir Alexander Fleming, James Young Simpson, Keir Hardie, Ramsay MacDonald, Alec Douglas-Home, John Logie Baird, Alexander Graham Bell, Arthur Conan Doyle, Ronnie Corbett, Billy Connolly, Lulu, Moira Anderson, Sean Connery, Andrew Cruickshank, Harry Lauder, William McGonagall, Peter Manuel, Madeleine Smith, Deacon Brodie, Sawney Bean, Major Weir, Fredric March (playing Dr Jekyll and Mr Hyde), Lon Chaney Jr. as the Werewolf.

=== Non-wax exhibits ===
The mummified body of James Bothwell, husband of Mary Queen of Scots.

=== Sets ===
The Massacre of Glencoe, Kate Barlass, the Execution of Mary Queen of Scots, Battle of Culloden, the Murder of Lord Darnley, the Murder of David Riccio, Bonnie Prince Charlie escaping dressed as Flora Macdonald's maid, Samuel Johnson with James Boswell, David Livingstone meeting H. M. Stanley, Queen Victoria with John Brown, The Witch Pricker.

=== Fictional characters ===
Humpty Dumpty, Little Red Riding Hood, Hansel and Gretel, Toad of Toad Hall, Frankenstein's monster, Dracula, Macbeth, Alice In Wonderland with the Duchess and Cheshire Cat, Long John Silver with Jim Hawkins, Ben Gunn and Captain Smollet, Peter Pan and Captain Hook, Peter Rabbit

=== Later additions ===
E.T., Mr. Spock, Prince Charles and Lady Diana
