= Thomas Tullideph =

Thomas Tullideph (sometimes Tulliedeph or Tullidelph; 1700–1777) was principal of St Leonards College at the University of St Andrews and Moderator of the General Assembly of the Church of Scotland in 1742. The odd surname is said to mean “hill of the oxen” and first appears as John de Tolidef in Aberdeen in the early 14th century.

Robert Fergusson described him as “fearsome” and nicknamed him "Pauly Tam".

== Life ==
He was born in 1700 in Dunbarney in Perthshire, one of seven children of Katrine Rankin and John Tullideph. He studied at the University of Edinburgh then briefly worked as a merchant in that city before studying divinity and being created minister of Dron church in 1727.

In 1730 he replaced Rev James Dickson as minister of Markinch Church in Fife. He resigned in 1734 to take up his position as a professor of Biblical criticism at the University of St Andrews, being replaced in Markinch by Rev George Preston. He was later raised from professor to principal and served as moderator in 1742, during this period.

In 1765 the famous Scots poet Robert Fergusson joined his class. Tullideph wished to expel him in March 1768 for his part in a “student riot” but was dissuaded by Prof Wilkie as Fergusson's graduation was imminent (May 1768).

He died on 14 November 1777 in St Andrews. His position as principal was filled by Mr Robert Watson.

== Family ==
On 31 October 1722 he married Alison Richardson in Edinburgh. They had ten children. His eldest daughter, Margaret Tullideph (died 1786) married David Thomson (1714–1779) in 1745.
