= John DeLancey Ferguson =

American writer and academic

- Born: November 13, 1888; Scottsville, New York
- Died: August 13, 1966 (aged 78)

John DeLancey Ferguson (November 13, 1888 – August 13, 1966) was a writer and academic.

== Early life ==
Ferguson was born at Scottsville, New York in 1888.

== Academic career ==
Ferguson attended Rutgers University, where he achieved a Bachelor of Arts degree in 1911 and Master of Arts in 1912. He then received his PhD from Columbia University.

He began his teaching career at Heidelberg College in 1914. He also taught at Ohio Wesleyan University, Case Western Reserve University and Brooklyn College. Ferguson was a fellow of the Society of Antiquaries of Scotland, a member of the Modern Language Association, and was awarded a Guggenheim Fellowship.

== Robert Burns ==
Ferguson is considered to be one of the foremost scholars of the life and work of Robert Burns. He was appointed as an honorary member of the Irvine Burns Club in 1962.

== Death ==
Ferguson died in 1966 in Connecticut after living with Parkinson's disease.

== Publications ==
- The Relations of the State to Religion in New York and New Jersey during the Colonial Period. New Brunswick: Rutgers College, 1912.
- American literature in Spain. New York: Columbia University Press, 1916.
- Selected Poems of Robert Burns. New York: Macmillan, 1926.
- The Letters of Robert Burns. Vol. 1. Oxford: Clarendon Press, 1931
- Some aspects of the Burns legend (1932)
- Men and Moments: A Book of Living Narratives. New York: Knight, 1938
- Theme and Variation in the Short Story. New York: The Cordon Company, 1938
- Pride and passion: Robert Burns, 1759-1796. New York: Oxford University Press, 1939
- with Robert Tyson Fitzhugh, Robert Burns, His Associates and Contemporaries. Chapel Hill: University of North Carolina Press, 1943.
- Mark Twain, man and legend (1943)
- The Merry Muses of Caledonia. with James Barke and Sydney Goodsir Smith. New York: Putnam, 1959.
- The Poems of Robert Burns. Glasgow: The University Press, 1965
