= Robert Fergusson =

Scottish poet and writer

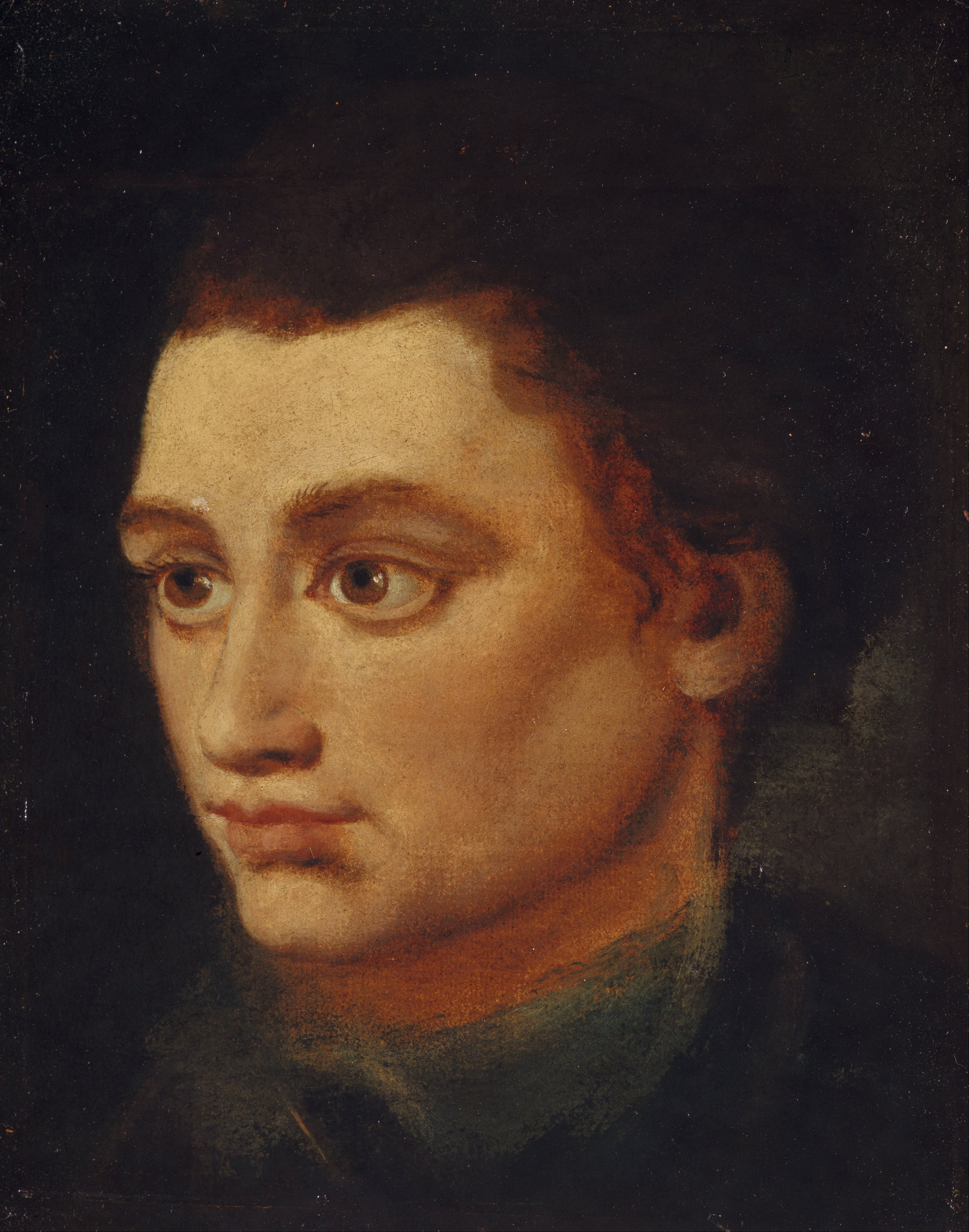
- Portrait by Alexander Runciman, 1772
- Born: 5 September 1750; Edinburgh (Capital City), Scotland
- Died: 17 October 1774 (aged 24); Darien House, Edinburgh, Scotland
- Education: University of St Andrews
- Occupations: Poet; librettist; copyist
- Writing career
- Notable works: "The Daft Days"; "Hallow Fair"; "Auld reekie"; "Leith Races"; "Caller Oysters"; "Braid Claith"
- Literary movement: Scots vernacular revival

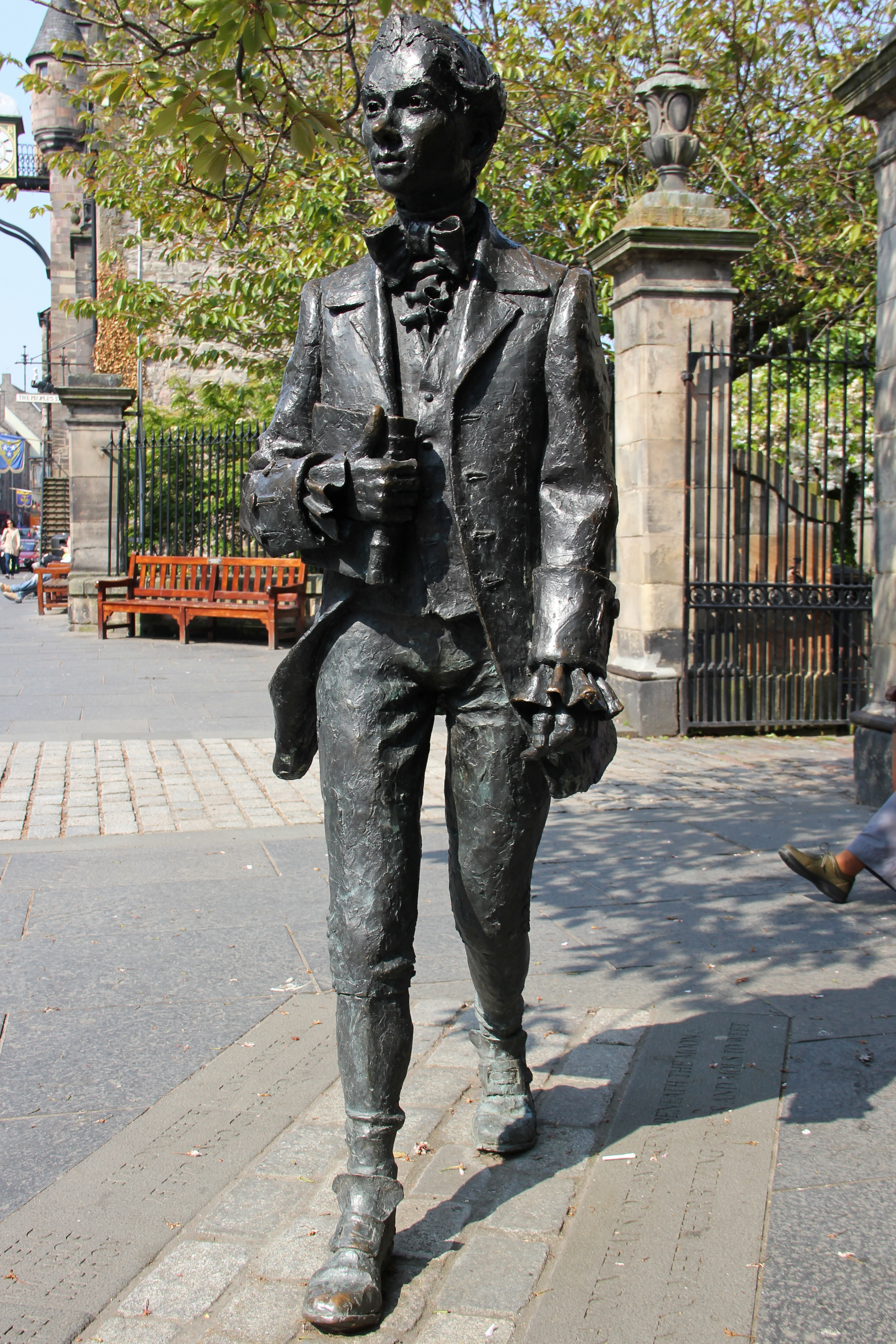
Bronze figure by David Annand of Robert Fergusson outside Edinburgh's Canongate Kirk where the poet is buried.

Robert Fergusson (5 September 1750 – 17 October 1774) was a Scottish poet. After formal education at the University of St Andrews, Fergusson led a bohemian life in Edinburgh, the city of his birth, then at the height of intellectual and cultural ferment as part of the Scottish Enlightenment. Many of his extant poems were printed from 1771 onwards in Walter Ruddiman's Weekly Magazine, and a collected works was first published early in 1773. Despite a short life, his career was highly influential, especially through its impact on Robert Burns. He wrote both Scottish English and the Scots language, and it is his vivid and masterly writing in the latter leid for which he is principally acclaimed.

== Life ==
Robert Fergusson was born in a tenement between Cap and Feather Close and Halkerstons Wynd, both small vennels north of Edinburgh's Royal Mile, demolished in 1763 to make way for what is today the hidden southern arches of the North Bridge. His parents, William and Elizabeth (née Forbes), were originally from Aberdeenshire, but had moved to the city two years previously and William was working as a clerk in the British Linen Bank. Robert was the third of three surviving children by them.

Fergusson received formal schooling at the city's High School and then the High School of Dundee. He attended the University of St Andrews with the assistance of a clan Fergusson bursary in September 1765. He was taught rhetoric by Robert Watson, professor of logic, whose lectures covered English literature. He excelled at mathematics under the tuition of William Wilkie. In March 1768, Principal Thomas Tullideph (nicknamed "Pauly Tam") was minded to expel Fergusson due to his part in a "student riot" but was dissuaded by Prof Wilkie due to Fergusson's imminent graduation (May 1768) and because Fergusson promised to help Wilkie organise lecture notes. In fact, Fergusson did not graduate but this was not uncommon and bore no shame. He did keep his word and aided Prof Wilkie over the summer writing the poem "Eclogue" to his memory later in life.

In late summer of 1768 Fergusson returned to Edinburgh. His father had died the previous year, his sister Barbara had married, and his older brother Harry had recently left Scotland, enlisting with the Royal Navy after a business failure. This probably left Fergusson, who had not completed his studies, to support their mother. Any possibility of family support from his maternal uncle, John Forbes of Round Lichnot near Auld Meldrum, ceased when his uncle permanently disowned him after a quarrel. Fergusson, who had rejected the church, medicine and law as career options open to him due to his university training, finally settled in Edinburgh as a copyist, the occupation of his father.

== Literary career ==
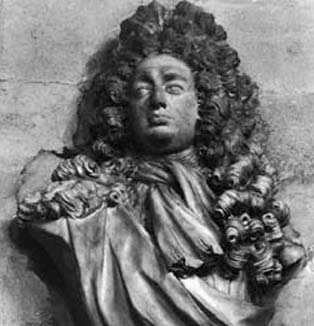
Mathematician David Gregory, subject of a "cheerful" satirical eulogy by Fergusson.

There is good evidence that Fergusson had already been developing literary ambitions as a student at St Andrews where he claimed to have begun drafting a play on the life of William Wallace. His earliest extant poem, also written at this time, is a satirical elegy in Scots on the death of David Gregory, one of the university's professors of maths.

Fergusson involved himself in Edinburgh's social and artistic circles mixing with musicians, actors, artists and booksellers who were also publishers. His friend, the theatre-manager William Woods, regularly procured him free admission to theatre productions and in mid-1769 Fergusson struck up a friendship with the Italian castrato singer Giusto Fernando Tenducci, who was touring with a production of Artaxerxes. Fergusson's literary debut came when Tenducci asked him to contribute Scots airs for the Edinburgh run of the opera. Fergusson supplied three, which were performed and published with the libretto.

After February 1771 he began to contribute poems to Walter Ruddiman's Weekly Review. These at first were generally conventional English language works that were either satirical or fashionably pastoral in the manner of William Shenstone. His first Scots poem to be published (The Daft Days) appeared on 2 January 1772, and from that date on he submitted works in both languages.

Popular reception for his Scots work, as evidenced in a number of verse epistles in its praise, helped persuade Ruddiman to publish a first general edition of his poems which appeared in early 1773 and sold around 500 copies, allowing Fergusson to clear a profit.

In mid-1773 Fergusson attempted his own publication of Auld Reekie, now regarded as his masterpiece, a vivid verse portrait of his home city intended as the first part of a planned long poem. It demonstrated his ambition to further extend the range of his Scots writing. This also included an aspiration to make Scots translations of Virgil's Georgics, thus following in the footsteps of Gavin Douglas. However, if any drafts for such a project were made, none survive. The poet was a hard self-critic and is known latterly to have destroyed manuscripts of his writing.

== Clubs ==
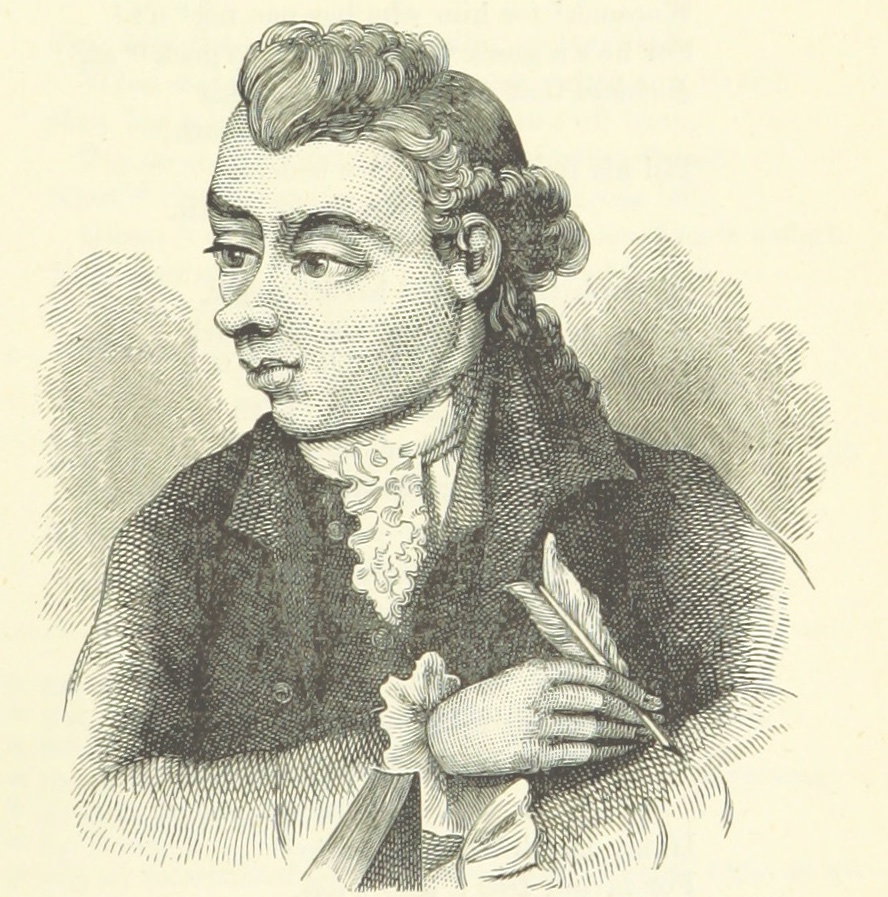
Drawing of the poet used in Cassell's Library of English Literature

Fergusson was a member of the Cape Club which regularly assembled at a tavern in Craig's Close. Each member had a name and character assigned to him, which he was required to maintain at all gatherings. David Herd (1732–1810), the collector of the classic edition of Ancient and Modern Scottish Songs (1776), was "sovereign" of the Cape (in which he was known as "Sir Scrape") when Fergusson was dubbed a knight of the order, with the title of "Sir Precentor", in allusion to his fine voice. Alexander Runciman, the historical painter, his pupil Jacob More, and Sir Henry Raeburn were all members. The old minute books of the club abound with pencilled sketches by them, one of the most interesting of which, ascribed to Runciman, is a sketch of Fergusson in his character of "Sir Precentor".

== Death ==
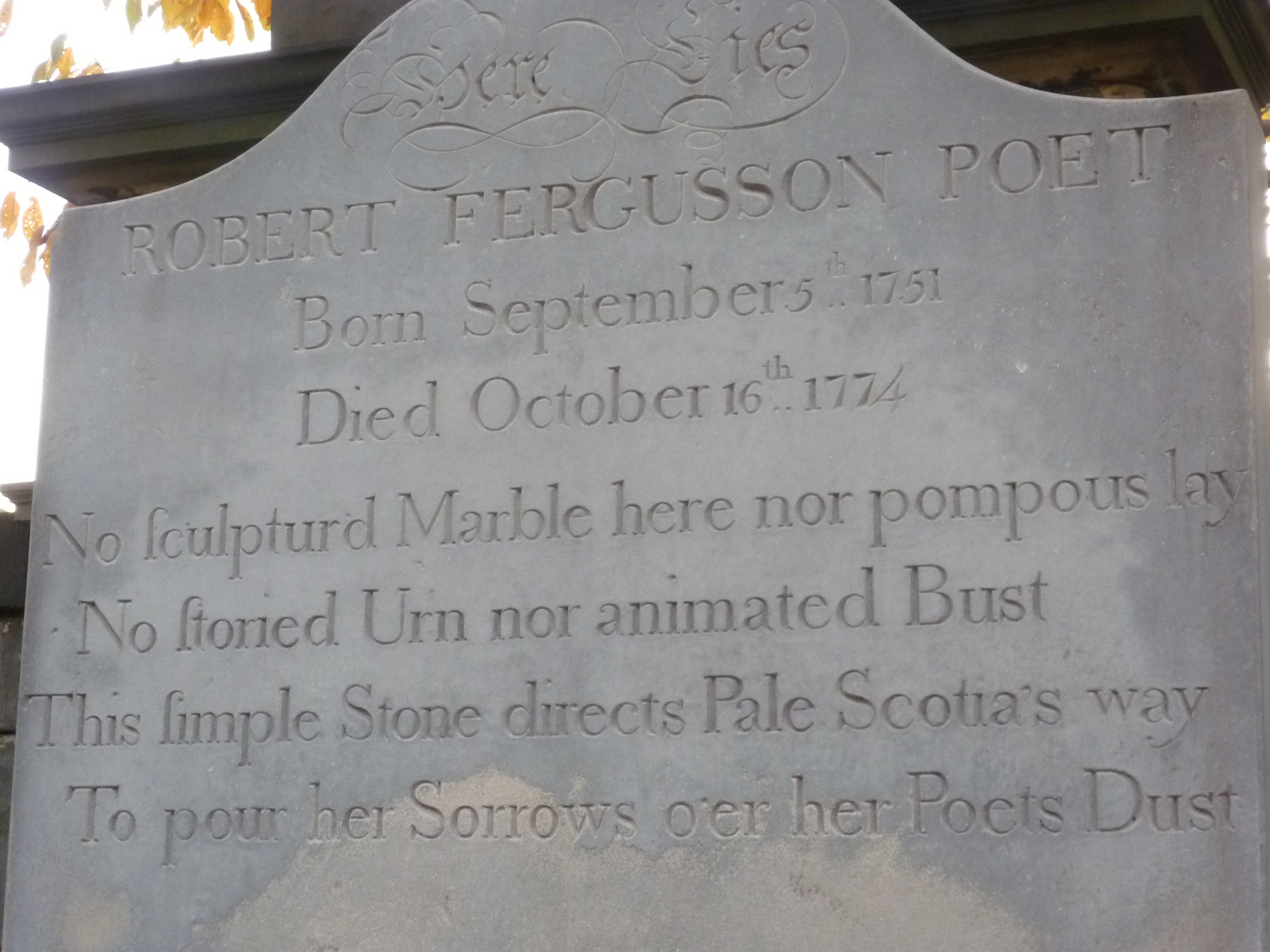
The Burns epitaph on the poet's headstone in Edinburgh's Canongate Kirkyard

Fergusson's literary energy and active social life were latterly overshadowed by what may have been depression although there are likely to have been other factors. From around mid-1773 his surviving works appear to become more darkly melancholic. In late 1773, in his "Poem to the Memory of John Cunningham" which was written on hearing news of the death of that poet in an asylum in Newcastle, Fergusson expressed fears of a similar fate.

His fears were founded. Around the backend of the year 1774, after sustaining a head injury in circumstances that are obscure (he fell heavily down a flight of stairs in Edinburgh, according to his epitaph), Fergusson was submitted against his will into Edinburgh's Darien House "hospital" (close to today's eponymous Bedlam Theatre), where, after a matter of weeks, he suddenly died. He had only just turned 24. He was buried in an unmarked grave on the west side of the Canongate Kirkyard.

The poet Robert Burns privately commissioned and paid for a memorial headstone of his own design in 1787, which was erected in 1789. The stone was restored in April 1850 by the poet Robert Gilfillan. In the later nineteenth century, Robert Louis Stevenson intended to renovate the stone, but died before he could do so. The epitaph that Stevenson planned to add to the stone is recorded on a plaque added to the grave by the Saltire Society on the Society's 50th anniversary in 1995.

== Memorials ==
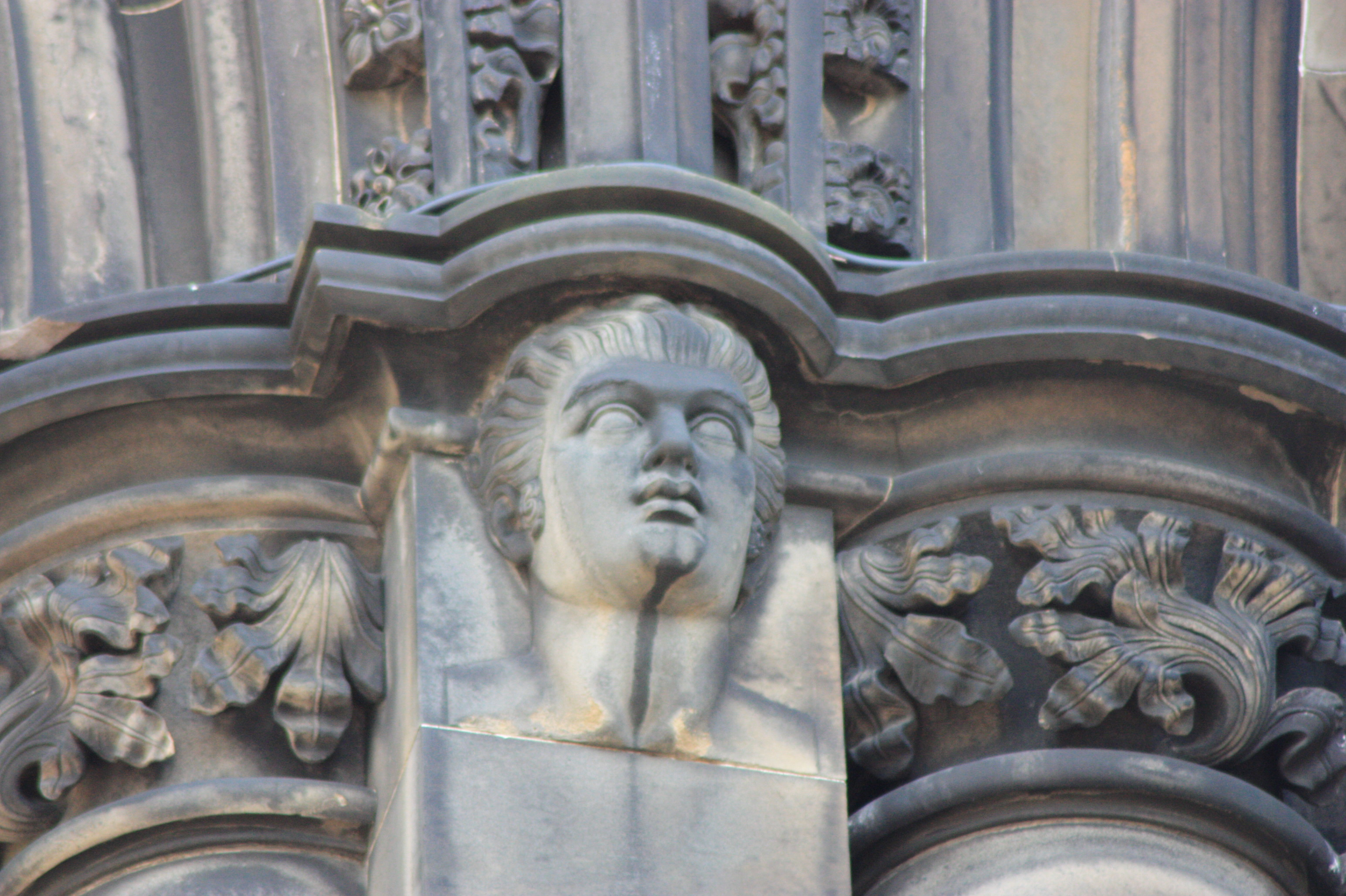
High relief portrait on the Scott Monument of Fergusson

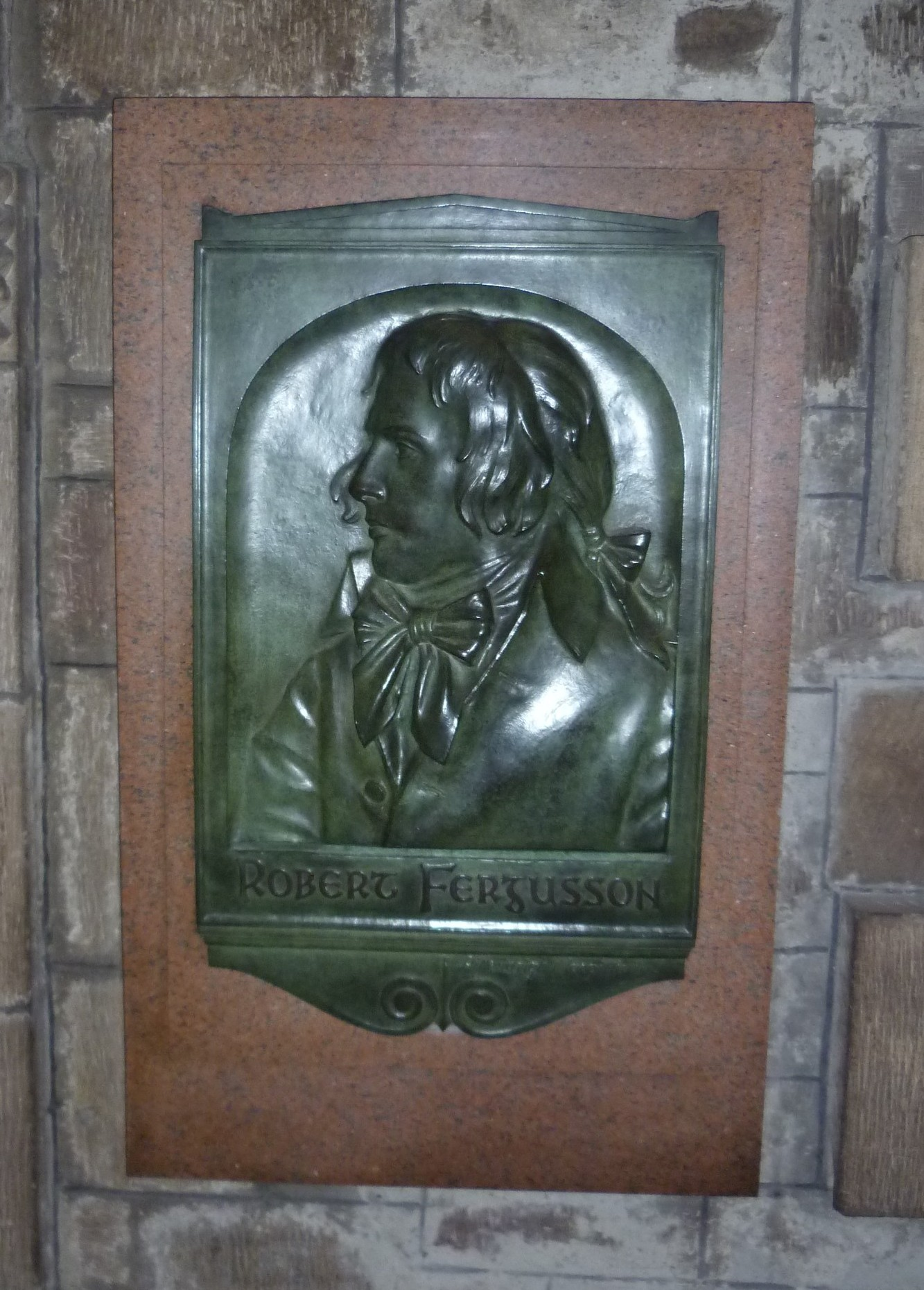
Fergusson plaque in the High Kirk of Edinburgh

Fergusson is one of the sixteen Scottish poets and writers depicted on the lower section of the Scott Monument on Princes Street. He appears on the right side of the west face, opposite Robert Burns.

A plaque was erected in his memory in St Giles Cathedral in the 1930s.

An independent statue outside Canongate Churchyard was unveiled on 17 October 2004, following a competition for a memorial to Fergusson. The sculptor was David Annand.

In 2024, a previously unknown portrait of Fergusson was discovered at Barnbougle Castle. It was part of a collection owned by the 5th Earl of Rosebery. According to research carried out by Professor Gerard Carruthers, the portrait might have been the work by James Cummyng, a fellow Cape Club member.

== Overview and influence ==
Fergusson's literary output was both urban and pastoral in equal degree. He was often an effective satirist and generally nationalist in themes and outlook. Although small, his canon stands as an important artistic and linguistic bridge between the generation of Allan Ramsay (1686–1758) and most later writers in Scots. His bilingual career was the acknowledged inspiration for the career of Robert Burns. Many leading makars of the twentieth century, such as Robert Garioch or Sydney Goodsir Smith, similarly recognised his importance. More widely, however, his legacy has tended to be unjustly neglected.

Many works by Burns either echo or are directly modelled on works by Fergusson. For example, "Leith Races" unquestionably supplied the model for Burns' "Holy Fair". "On seeing a Butterfly in the Street" has reflections in it which strikingly correspond with "To a Mouse". Comparisons, such as between Fergusson's "The Farmer's Ingle" and Burns' "The Cotter's Saturday Night", often demonstrate the creative complexity of the influence.

Fergusson's life also had one important non-literary influence. The brutal circumstances of the poet's death prompted one of his visitors in Darien House, the young doctor Andrew Duncan (1744–1828), to pioneer better institutional practices for the treatment of mental health problems through the creation of what is today the Royal Edinburgh Hospital.

Fergusson is credited with the first printed use of the phrase shank's nag to refer to walking, later also used in colloquial or humorous forms as Shank's mare or Shank's pony.

== Editions ==
Ruddiman's 1773 edition of Fergusson's work was reprinted in 1779 with a supplement containing additional poems. A second edition appeared in 1785. There are later editions, by Robert Chambers (1850) and Alexander Grosart (1851). A life of Fergusson is included in David Irving's Lives of the Scottish Poets, and in Robert Chambers's Lives of Illustrious and Distinguished Scotsmen. Grosart also contributed a biography of Fergusson for the "Famous Scots Series", (Edinburgh: Oliphant, Anderson and Ferrier, 1898).

Modern editions of Fergusson include the definitive two-volume collection of his works in both Scots and Scottish English, edited by the scholar Matthew McDiarmid, BrThe Poems of Robert Fergusson, published in the 1950s, and Robert Fergusson, Selected Poems, a popular edition of the poetry in Scots, edited by the author James Robertson and first published around the turn of the present century.

In 2023, a Leverhulme-Trust funded project 'The Collected Works of Robert Fergusson: Reconstructing Textual and Cultural Legacies' began at the University of Glasgow, led by Professor Rhona Brown. This project has two aims: to produce a new scholarly edition of Fergusson's works for the twenty-first century reader; and to commemorate the poet's legacies through academic and collaborative events with external partners throughout 2024 (the 250th anniversary of his death) and 2025.

== See also ==
- Habbie stanza
- Scottish literature
- Scots language
- Thomas Chatterton
