= Alexander Irving, Lord Newton =

Scottish judge and academic

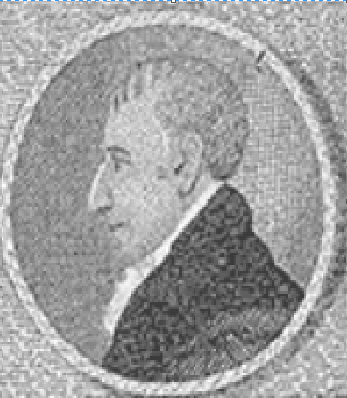
Alexander Irving, Lord Newton

Alexander Irving, Lord Newton FRSE (1766–1832) was a Scottish judge who served as professor of civil law at Edinburgh University from 1800 to 1826. He was a Senator of the College of Justice.

== Life ==
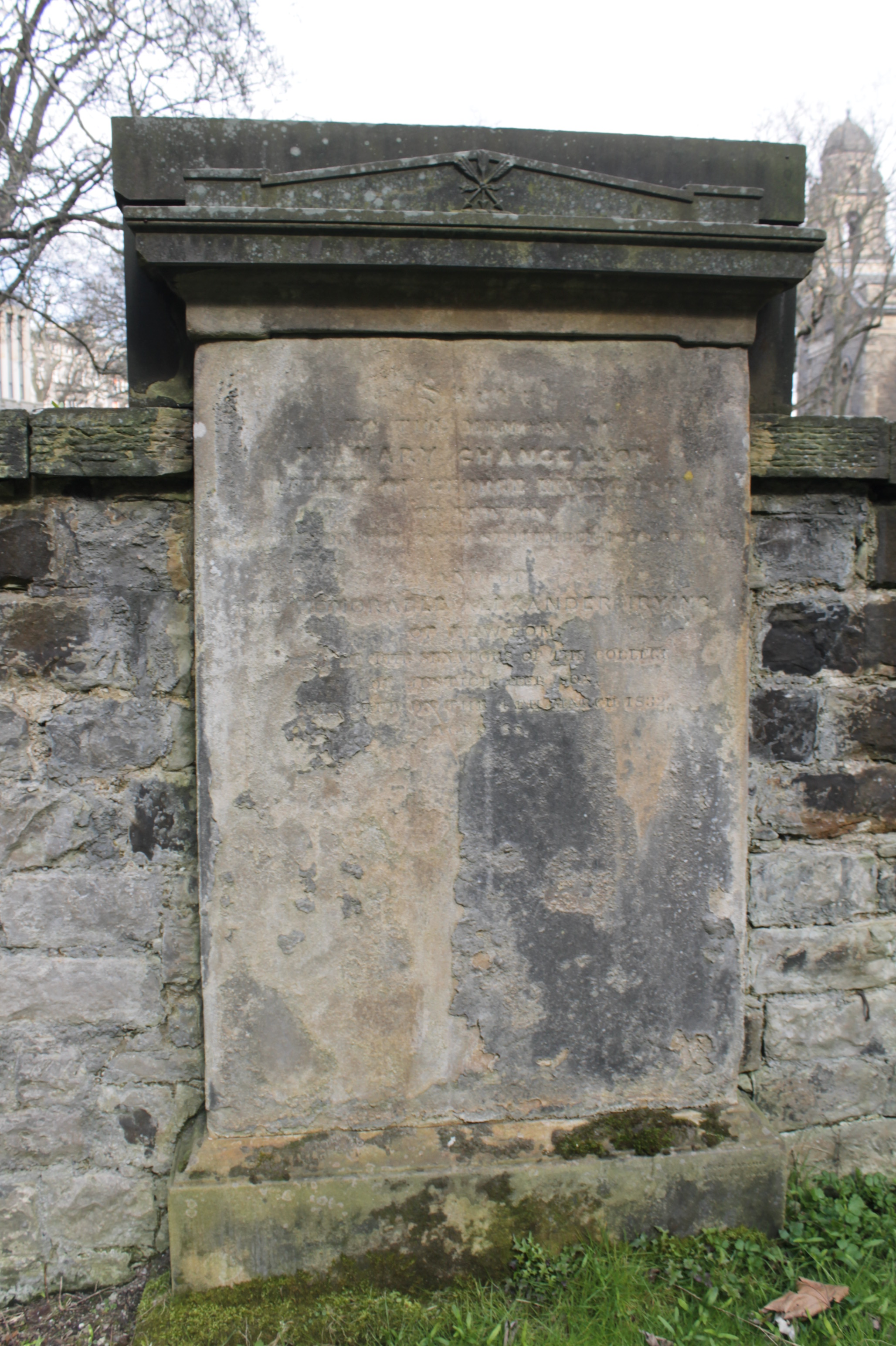
The grave of Alexander Irving, Lord Newton, St John's Churchyard, Edinburgh

He was born on 12 October 1766, the son of George Irving of Newton, by Elvanfoot (South Lanarkshire). The Irvings of Newton were a cadet branch of the Scottish family the Irvines of Drum.

He was educated at Edinburgh High School 1773 to 1777 and then studied law at Edinburgh University. He was created an advocate in 1788 and for many years was Treasurer of the Faculty of Advocates.

He became a professor of civil law at Edinburgh University in 1800, initially assisting and later replacing Prof John Wilde, and in the same year took over as manager of the Scots Mining Company, then based at Leadhills. In the final six years of his life he left the university to concentrate on his practical legal skills, becoming a Senator of the College of Justice (a High Court judge). At this time he was living at 5 Buccleuch Place, a large flat in Edinburgh's South Side. He later lived at 27 Heriot Row, Edinburgh.

In 1804 he was elected a fellow of the Royal Society of Edinburgh. His proposers were John Playfair, Andrew Coventry, and Thomas Charles Hope. He served as president of the Society's Physical branch 1823 to 1828 and as their vice president 1828 to 1832.

In December 1826 he was created a Senator of the College of Justice in place of William Robertson, Lord Robertson (who retired) and adopted the title of Lord Newton.

In the late 18th century he was a member of the Crochallan Fencibles, a club which met at Dawney's Tavern on Anchor Close in Edinburgh.

He died following a painful operation on kidney stones after which he became infected, dying on 4 March 1832 in Edinburgh (information from his gravestone). He is buried in the churchyard of St John's Episcopal Church, Edinburgh. The grave lies in the extreme south-west section, facing west to Lothian Road. It is highly eroded and barely legible.

From: The Journal of Henry Cockburn, 1831-1853, pp. 26–27

13th March 1832." Alexander Irving, Lord Newton, after enduring the worst possible operation of lithotomy with the greatest possible courage last January, died about ten days ago. No man ever rose so much above expectation after being made a judge. The poverty of his manner would probably have prevented his ever shining when he had to face a jury, and I am not certain that it would have enabled him to deliver publically [sic] even a legal argument with much judicial weight or luminousness, especially in a court with other judges, but as a single judge in civil causes, deciding with written leisurely judgements, he was perfect. An acute and well-instructed understanding, great knowledge of law, general intelligence, especially in science, a laborious patient manner, admirable listening, only broken by short judicious interrogations, perfect serenity, complete candour and a devotion to his business – these qualities account for the high judicial status he attained."

From: Kay’s Originals Vol. 2, p. 462

No. CCCXXVL

Twelve Advocates Who Plead Without Wigs

11." Alexander Irving, afterwards Lords Newton, was the son of George Irving of Newton. He was admitted to the bar in 1788; and for many years held the office of Treasurer to the Faculty of Advocates. He was distinguished for extensive legal judgements and in 1800 was appointed assistant and successor to Mr John Wilde, Professor of Civil Law in the University of Edinburgh. On the retirement of Lord Robertson, in 1826, he was promoted to the bench when he assumed the title of Lord Newton. His lordship filled the judicial seat only a few years. He died on the 23rd March 1832. As a judge he gave general satisfaction. Though a very indifferent speaker, he was an excellent lawyer, and his decisions were seldom altered in the Inner-House. He was mild and gentle in his manners. He was fond of music, and was an excellent performer on the violin. Lord Newton married Miss Irving, a relation of his own, by whom he left an only son.".

From:Lt John Irving, Of H.M.S Terror, In Sir John Franklin’s Last Expedition to the Arctic Regions: A Memorial Sketch with Letters (1881) Benjamin Bell, pp1–2:

"Lord Newton (Lt Irving’s uncle) was an eminent mathematician and at the same time a man of general culture.”

== Family ==
In 1814 he married a cousin, Bethenia Irving (died 1855). Their only son was George Vere Irving FSA (1815–1869).

Please note, in the earlier version of this text, ref to Grant's Old and New Edinburgh Vol.111, pp. 187–188, Alexander Irving, Lord Newton, has been confused with Charles Hay, also Lord Newton.
