= Sydney Goodsir Smith =

New Zealand writer (1915–1975)

- Born: 26 October 1915; Wellington, New Zealand
- Died: 15 January 1975 (aged 59); Edinburgh, Scotland
- Movement: Scottish Renaissance

Sydney Goodsir Smith (26 October 1915 – 15 January 1975) was a New Zealand-born Scottish poet, artist, dramatist and novelist. He wrote poetry in literary Scots, sometimes referred to as Lallans, and was a major figure of the Scottish Renaissance.

== Life ==
He was born in Wellington, New Zealand, the son of Catherine Goodsir Gelenick and Sydney Smith, a pioneer in forensic science who later became a Regius Professor in forensic medicine at the University of Edinburgh.

He moved to Edinburgh with his family in 1928. He was educated at Malvern College. He went to the University of Edinburgh to study medicine, but abandoned that, and started to study history at Oriel College, Oxford; whence he was expelled, but managed to complete a degree. He also claimed to have studied art in Italy, wine in France and mountains in Bavaria.

In the late 1930s, Smith was introduced to the works of Hugh MacDiarmid by Hector MacIver, a literary critic who taught English at Edinburgh's Royal High School. In a letter dated 1 November 1941 he informed MacDiarmid that he 'gave up writing English for Scots' after reading A Drunk Man Looks at the Thistle (1926).

His first poetry collection, Skail Wind, was published in 1941. Carotid Cornucopius (1947) was a comic novel about Edinburgh. Under the Eildon Tree (1948), a long poem in 24 parts, is considered by many his finest work; The Grace of God and the Meth-Drinker is a much-anthologised poem. His A Short Introduction to Scottish Literature, based on four broadcast talks, was published in 1951.

His play The Wallace was broadcast on the radio in a BBC production by Finlay J. MacDonald on 30 November 1959. It was staged at the Kirk's Assembly Hall in a production by Peter Potter as part of the 1960 Edinburgh International Festival, with Ian Cuthbertson in the leading role. The play was revived by the Scottish Theatre Company in 1985. Kynd Kittock's Land (1964) was a poem commissioned by the BBC for television broadcast. Other works broadcast by the BBC as dramas or poetic dialogues include The Death of Tristram and Iseult (1947), The Vision of the Prodigal Son (1959), The Stick Up or Full Circle (1961), The Twa Brigs (1964), A Night at Ambrose's (1972), Macallister (1973), and Gowdspink in Reekie (1976). Unpublished works include Bottled Peaches, a novel which draws on his life as a student in Oxford, and The Merrie Life and Dowie Death of Colickie Meg, a dramatic adaptation and continuation of Carotid Cornucopius.

As a young man, Smith's ambition was to be an artist. While travelling in Europe in 1936–37, he made drawings in Switzerland, Germany, Italy and France. In post-war Scotland he made sketches of contemporary subjects and drawings to illustrate his poems. He also sketched and painted watercolours on trips to the Highlands with Denis Peploe and Sorley MacLean. Drawings collected by the architect Ian Begg were published in a book edited by Joy Hendry in 1998. Smith was art critic of The Scotsman from 1960 to 1967.

Smith was a member of the Scottish Arts Club and was associated with the editorial board for the Lines Review magazine.

He died in the Royal Infirmary of Edinburgh after a heart attack outside a newsagents on Dundas Street in Edinburgh, and was buried in Dean Cemetery in the northern 20th century section, towards the north-west. His second wife, Hazel Williamson, lies with him.

== Memorials ==
He is commemorated by a "pavement poem" in the "Makars' Court" a section of James Court off the Lawnmarket on the Royal Mile.

== Works ==
- Skail Wind - poems, Edinburgh, The Chalmers press, 1941
- The Wanderer, and other poems, Edinburgh, Oliver and Boyd, 1943
- The Deevil’s Waltz, Glasgow, W. MacLellan, 1946
- Carotid Cornucopius: The first 4 fitts making 'One Quart', The Caledonian Press, 1947
- Selected Poems, Edinburgh, published for The Saltire Society by Oliver and Boyd, 1947
- Under the Eildon Tree: A Poem in XXIV Elegies, Serif Books, 1948
- The Aipple and the Hazel, privately printed by the Caledonian Press for Hogmanay, 1951
- A Short Introduction to Scottish Literature, Serif Books, 1951
- So Late into the Night - fifty lyrics, 1944-1948, with a preface by Edith Sitwell, London, P. Russell, 1952
- Cokkils, M Macdonald, 1953
- Under the Eildon Tree (Revised Edition), Serif Books, 1954
- Omens: Nine Poems, M Macdonald, 1955
- Orpheus and Eurydice - a dramatic poem, Edinburgh, M. Macdonald, 1955
- Figs and Thistles, Edinburgh, Oliver and Boyd, 1959
- The Wallace, a triumph in five acts, Edinburgh, Oliver and Boyd, 1960
- The Vision of the Prodigal Son, M. Macdonald, 1960
- Carotid Cornucopius, caird o the Cannon Gait and voyeur o the Outluik Touer, Edinburgh, M. Macdonald, 1964
- Kynd Kittock’s Land, Edinburgh, M. Macdonald, 1965
- Fifteen Poems and a Play, Edinburgh, Southside, 1969
- Gowdspink in Reekie, M. Macdonald, 1974
- Collected Poems, 1941-1975, with an introduction by Hugh MacDiarmid, London, John Calder, 1975
- The Drawings of Sydney Goodsir Smith, poet, collected by Ian Begg, edited by Joy Hendry, Edinburgh, Chapman Press, on behalf of The New Auk Society, 1998
- A Publisher of the Nineties (Leonard Smithers) in The Holiday Book. 1946 (Ed. by John Singer)

As editor:

- Robert Fergusson, 1750–1774: essays by various hands (Edinburgh: Nelson, 1952)
- Gavin Douglas: a selection from his poetry (Edinburgh: Oliver & Boyd, 1959)
- The Merry Muses of Caledonia, with James Barke and John DeLancey Ferguson (Edinburgh: M. Macdonald, 1959).
- Hugh MacDiarmid: a Festschrift, with Kulgin Duval (Edinburgh: K.D. Duval, 1962)
- Bannockburn: The Story of the Battle and its Place in Scotland's History (Scots Independent, 1964)
- A Choice of Burns’s Poems and Songs (London: Faber and Faber, 1966)

== Reviews ==
- Campbell, Donald (1975), review of Gowdspink in Reekie, in Burnett, Ray (ed.), Calgacus 2, Summer 1975, pp. 54 & 55, ISSN 0307-2029
- Burns, John (1983), review of Carotid Cornucopius, in Hearn, Sheila G. (ed), Cencrastus No. 14, Autumn 1983, pp. 50 & 51, ISSN 0264-0856
