= Jean Redpath =

Scottish folk singer (1937–2014)

- Born: 28 April 1937; Edinburgh, Scotland
- Died: 21 August 2014 (aged 77) Tucson, Arizona, U.S.
- Genres: Folk
- Occupation: Singer

Jean Redpath MBE (28 April 1937 – 21 August 2014) was a Scottish folk singer.

== Career ==
Jean Redpath was born in Edinburgh, Scotland, to musical parents. Her mother knew many Scots songs and passed them on to Jean and her brother, and her father played the hammered dulcimer. She was raised in Leven, Fife, Scotland, and later returned to Edinburgh, taking medieval studies at the University of Edinburgh. To help pay her way through her studies, she sang for beer money and undertook part-time work as a driving instructor and undertaker's assistant.

The Scottish poet and folk-song collector Hamish Henderson was working in the School of Scottish Studies at the university and Redpath took a keen interest in the archive of tapes and discs of music and songs. She learned about 400 songs, together with the oral folklore that went with them. In March 1961, at the age of 24, she arrived in the United States with just eleven dollars in her pocket. Her first performance was in San Francisco. Later she met up with Ramblin' Jack Elliott and Bob Dylan in Greenwich Village. The natural warmth and power of her voice brought her to perform at Gerde's Folk City. In 1963, following a concert performance, she signed with Elektra Records. In 1975, she switched to the Philo label. From 1972 to 1976, Redpath was artist-in-residence at Wesleyan University in Middletown, Connecticut. She lectured in folklore and acted as cultural resource in the local school system.

In 1976, Redpath embarked on a project to record all the songs of Robert Burns, some being folk songs, some Burns's own compositions, and most a mixture of the two. Twenty-two volumes were planned, but when her collaborator, the composer Serge Hovey, died after seven volumes, the project came to a premature end. Hovey had done the instrumental arrangements for 323 songs, and Redpath felt no other musician could replace him. The albums won critical praise from around the world. In 1986, she recorded Lady Nairne, a collection of songs written by Scottish women. Redpath sensitively reconstructed songs that might otherwise have been lost. Between 1974 and 1987, Redpath appeared regularly on Garrison Keillor's "A Prairie Home Companion" APM radio show. She also appeared on Robert J. Lurtsema's "Morning pro musica" broadcast from WGBH in Boston.

Redpath toured throughout the U.S. and Canada, played venues in South America, Hong Kong, and Australia, including the Sydney Opera House, and performed often at the Edinburgh Folk Festival. In 1977, Royal Jubilee Year, Redpath appeared at a royal banquet at Edinburgh Castle for Queen Elizabeth II.

Starting in 1979, Redpath was a lecturer at the University of Stirling, Scotland, with occasional trips to teach at Wesleyan University. She gave courses for ten years in Scottish Song at the Heritage of Scotland Summer School at the University of Stirling.

She was awarded the MBE in 1987, as well as being named a Kentucky colonel by the Governor of Kentucky. Redpath also received honorary doctorates from the Royal Conservatoire of Scotland, University of Stirling and the University of St Andrews, and was inducted into the Scottish Traditional Music Hall of Fame in 2008. A portrait of Redpath by Alexander Fraser hangs in the Scottish National Portrait Gallery in Edinburgh. In 1996, she launched the Burns International Festival.

In 2009, Redpath made an appearance on the Late Show with David Letterman, singing "Some Kind of Love" by the late John Stewart of The Kingston Trio. Letterman promoted her album By Request during her appearance, although the song "Some Kind of Love" does not appear on that album. This led to some confusion for viewers who wished to obtain a recorded version of the song.

In 2011, she returned to her alma mater to become artist-in-residence at the University of Edinburgh’s Department of Celtic and Scottish Studies. She kept her links to Scotland, owning a house in Elie during her life.

== Death and legacy ==
Redpath died from cancer on 21 August 2014 at a hospice in Tucson, Arizona.

In the town where Redpath was raised, Leven in Fife, there is a street named in her honour: Jean Redpath Wynd.

== Discography ==
- Skipping Barefoot Through the Heather (1962) Prestige PR 13020
- Scottish Ballad Book (1962) Elektra EKL 214
- Laddie Lie Near Me (1963) Elektra EKL 274
- Songs of Love, Lilt, Laughter (1963) Elektra EKL 224
- Frae My Ain Countrie (1973) Folk Legacy FSS 49
- Jean Redpath (1975) Philo PH 2015
- Songs of Robert Burns vol. 1 (1976) Philo PH 1037
- There were Minstrels (1977) Trailer LER 2106
- Ballad Folk (1977) Jean Redpath With Guests BBC Records REC 293
- Song of the Seals (1978) Philo PH 1054
- Angels Hovering 'Round with Lisa Neustadt and The Angel Band (1979) Fretless FR 138
- Father Adam with Abby Newton (1979) Philo PH 1061
- Songs of Robert Burns vol. 2 (1980) Philo PH 1048
- Shout for Joy with Lisa Neustadt and The Angel Band (1980) Philo PH 1068
- Songs of Robert Burns vol. 3 (1981) Philo PH 1071
- Songs of Robert Burns vol. 4 (1981) Philo PH 1072
- Haydn: Scottish Songs (1984) Philo PH 1082
- Love Is Teasin' (1984) Philo/Minnesota Public Radio PHC 1111
- Songs of Robert Burns vol. 5 (1985) Philo PH 1093
- The Scottish Fiddle (1985) Lismor LIFL 7009
- Lowlands (1986) Philo PH 1066
- Lady Nairne (1986)
- Anywhere Is Home with Lisa Neustadt and The Angel Band (1979) Fretless FR-154
- A Fine Song For Singing with Abby Newton (1987) Philo PH 1110
- Songs of Robert Burns vol. 6 (1987) Philo PH 1114
- First Flight (1989) Rounder Records 11556
- Songs of Robert Burns vol 7 (1990) Philo PH 1126
- Leaving the Land (1990) Philo PH 1131
- The Miller's Reel with Rod Paterson, David Hayman, Phyllis Logan (1996) BBC REH 737
- The Moon's Silver Cradle (1996) Jean Redpath Records JR-106
- A Woman of Her Time (1997) Jean Redpath Records JR-107
- Think On Me (1998) Jean Redpath Records JR-108
- Still the Night (1999) Jean Redpath Records JR-109
- Now & Then (1999) Jean Redpath Records JR-110
- Summer of My Dreams (2000) Greentrax CDTRAX208
- Live (2000) Jean Redpath Records JR-111
- Maiden Voyage (2002) Jean Redpath Records JR-112
- By Request (2004) Jean Redpath Records JR-113
