= Alexander Runciman =

British artist (1736–1785)

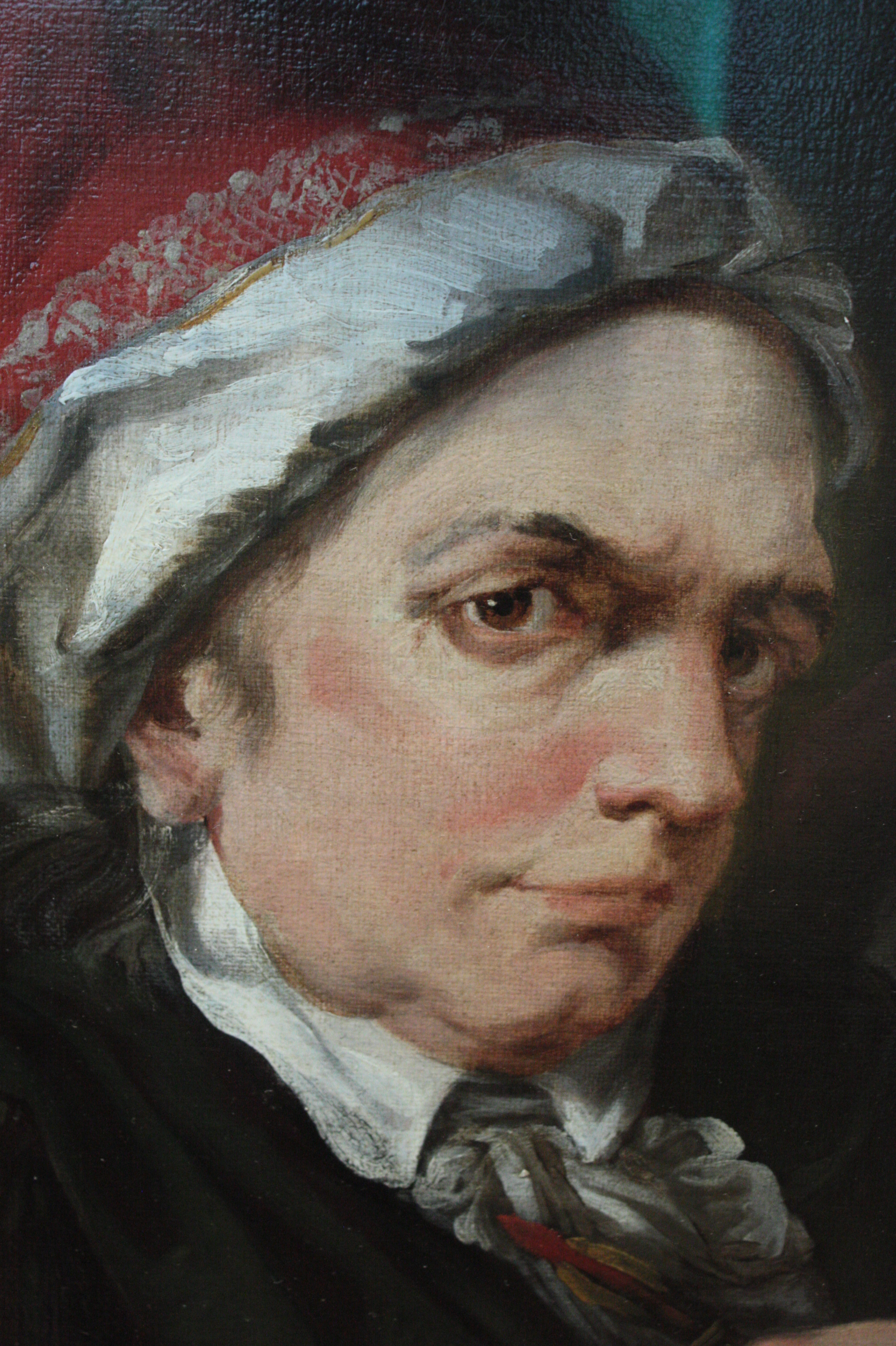
- Alexander Runciman (self-portrait c.1785)
- Born: 15 August 1736; Edinburgh, Scotland
- Died: 4 October 1785 (aged 49); Edinburgh, Scotland

Alexander Runciman (15 August 1736 – 4 October 1785) was a Scottish painter of historical and mythological subjects. He was the elder brother of John Runciman, also a painter.

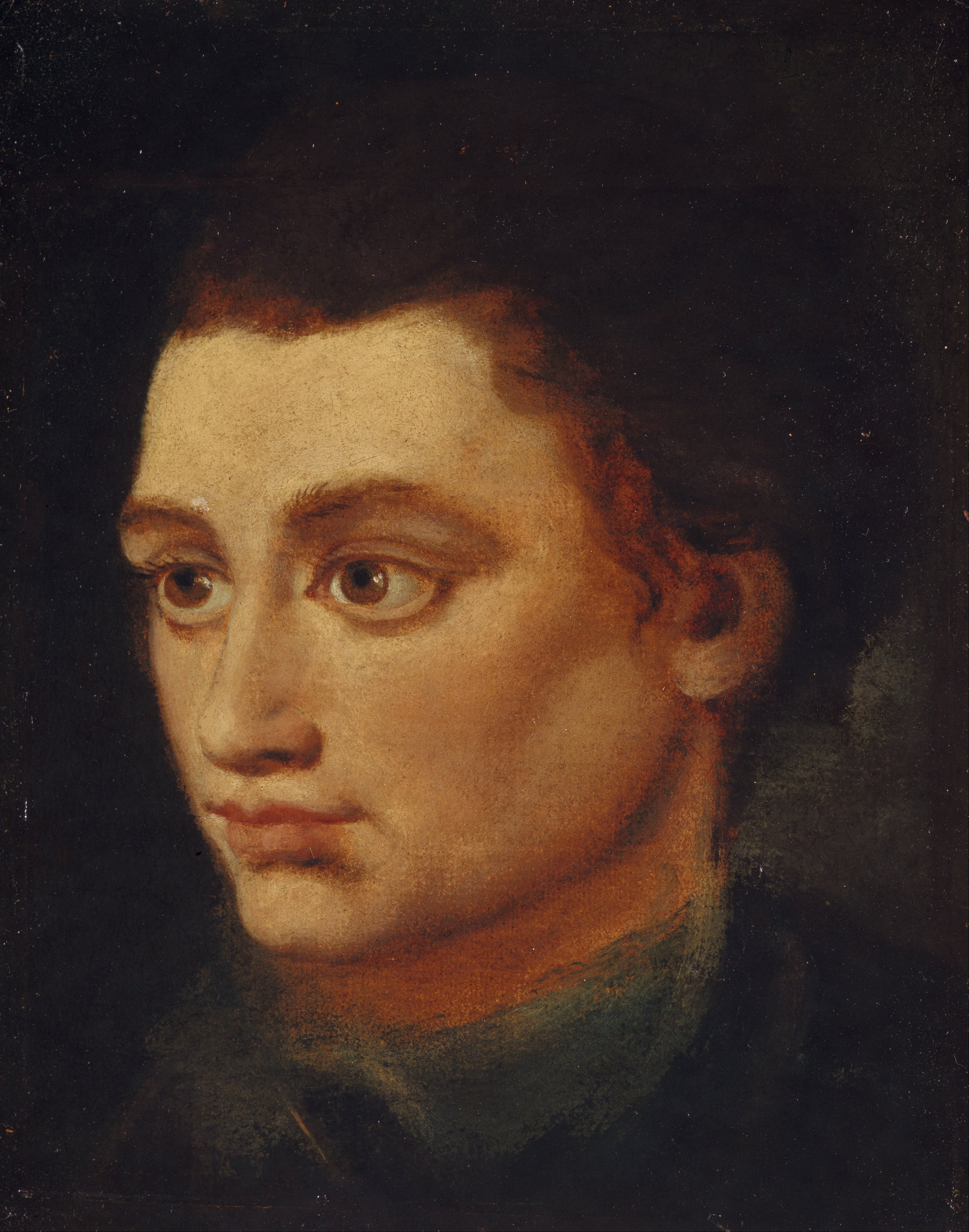
Robert Fergusson by Alexander Runciman

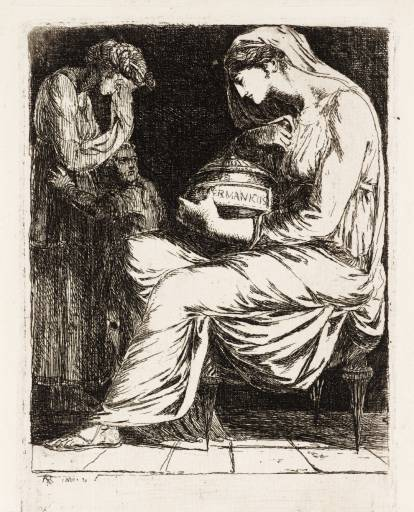
Agrippina with the Ashes of Germanicus, circa 1773, Tate Gallery

== Life ==
He was born in Edinburgh, and studied at the Foulis Academy, Glasgow. From 1750 to 1762 he was apprenticed to the landscape painter Robert Norie, later becoming a partner in the Norie family firm. He also worked as a stage painter for the Theatre Royal in Edinburgh.

In 1767, with financial support from Robert Alexander of Edinburgh, he went to Rome, where he spent five years. His brother John accompanied him, but died in Naples in the winter of 1768–69. During Runciman's stay in Italy he became acquainted with other artists such as James Barry, Henry Fuseli and the sculptor Johan Tobias Sergel. Runciman's earliest efforts had been in landscape; he now turned to historical and imaginative subjects, exhibiting his Nausicaa at Play with her Maidens in 1767 at the Free Society of British Artists, Edinburgh.

On his return from Italy after a brief time in London, where in 1772 he exhibited in the Royal Academy, he settled in Edinburgh, and was appointed master of the Trustees' Academy. He was patronised by Sir James Clerk, decorating the hall of his Penicuik House with a series of subjects from Ossian which took inspiration from Gavin Hamilton's Iliad pictures, and an adjacent staircase with four scenes from the life of Saint Margaret. He also created various religious paintings and an altar-piece in the Cowgate Episcopal Church, Edinburgh, and easel pictures of Cymon and Iphigenia, Sigismunda Weeping over the Heart of Tancre, and Agrippina with the Ashes of Germanicus.

In 1773 he is listed as sharing a studio with a Mr McLarin at the foot of Old Assembly Close off the Royal Mile (facing what is now called the Cowgate). He was a member of the Edinburgh Cape Club.

He enjoyed a strong reputation as a landscape painter in his lifetime.

Runciman died in Edinburgh and is buried in Canongate Churchyard. The grave is unmarked but a stone plaque was erected by the RSA in 1866 on the west-facing wall of the church to his memory (also commemorating his brother John who died in Naples).

== Known works ==
see

- Robert Fergusson
- East Lothian Landscape
- Dunvegan Castle
- The Blind Ossian Singing
- The Landing of St Margaret
- Self portrait with John Brown
- The Witches Showing MacBeth the Apparitions
- Fingal Encounters Carbon Carglass
- Agrippina with the Ashes of Germanicus
- Hubert and Arthur
- Agrippina Landing at Brundisium
- A View near Perth
- Italian River Landscape with a Hermit
- David Steuart Erskine
- Temple of the Sibyl at Tipoli
- Murals in the east apse in St Patrick's Church South Gray's Close, Edinburgh.St Patrick's, Cowgate, Edinburgh
