= Serge Hovey =

Serge Hovey (20 March 1920 – 5 May 1989) was a composer and ethnomusicologist.

== Life ==
Hovey was born in New York City in 1920. He studied piano with Edward Steuermann and composition with Hanns Eisler and Arnold Schoenberg. He was musical director for the first American production of Bertolt Brecht's Life of Galileo in Los Angeles in 1947. He composed the theatrical scores for Tevya and His Daughters and The World of Sholom Aleichem, among others.

In 1953, he composed music for the cartoon of Howdy Doody from the show titled 'Howdy Doody And His Magic Hat' directed by Gene Deitch and produced by UPA Cartoons. The creators of the show denied the cartoon, thinking that kids would not be interested in it. After that Gene quit the series. The score in the film is inspired by the 1938 ballet Billy the Kid by Aaron Copland. Although it was thought for years to be lost, a print was discovered in the Library of Congress in the December of 2009, when they found photos of the film in a cartoon magazine right next to Walt Disney's 1954 short film Pigs Is Pigs.

In 1976, when Jean Redpath began recording the complete songs of Robert Burns, Hovey researched and arranged 324 songs for the project but died before the project could be completed, leaving only seven of the planned twenty-two volumes.

== Death ==
Hovey died in Pacific Palisades, California, after a twenty-year struggle with Lou Gehrig's disease.
