= James Barke =

Scottish novelist

James William Barke
- Born: 22 May 1905; Torwoodlee, near Galashiels, Scotland
- Died: 20 March 1958 (aged 52); Glasgow, Scotland
- Occupation: Novelist
- Spouse: Agnes (Nan) Coats
- Writing career
- Period: 1933–1958
- Genre: General fiction
- Subjects: Socialism; Glasgow; Robert Burns; Scotland

James William Barke (22 May 1905 - 20 March 1958) was a Scottish novelist.

== Biography ==
Born in Torwoodlee, near Galashiels, Selkirkshire, Barke was the fourth child of James Bark, a dairyman and Jane, a dairymaid. In 1907, the family moved to Tulliallan in Fife, where he attended Tulliallan parish school. In 1918, they moved to Glasgow, where he attended Hamilton Crescent public school. He trained as an engineer and worked as the manager of a shipbuilding firm. He was involved in local and nationalist politics. His obituary states that he: "Wrote and felt as a conscious proletarian, in a period when proletarian self-consciousness was particularly strong". His first novel, The World his Pillow was published in 1933. He also married Nan Coats in this year. The couple went on to have two sons.

After 1945, Barke resigned from his job, and the family moved to Ayrshire, where he worked on The Immortal Memory, his series of five novels based on the life of Robert Burns. The novels were popular with readers, but not with Burns scholars. The family returned to Glasgow in 1955. Barke died on 20 March 1958. His funeral was addressed by Hugh MacDiarmid.

== Fiction ==
His first three novels are set in the Highlands of Scotland, treating the subject of the sadness and bitterness of the empty glens and straths following the Highland Clearances. The fourth, Major Operation, is a novel about Glasgow's Clydeside during the Great Depression. The Land of the Leal moves to the Scottish Lowlands. His Immortal Memory quintet was about the life of the poet, Robert Burns.

== Bibliography ==
- The World his Pillow, 1933
- The Wild MacRaes, 1934
- The End of the High Bridge, 1935
- Major Operation, 1936
- The Land of the Leal, 1939
- The Immortal Memory quintet
  - The Wind that Shakes the Barley, 1946
  - The Song in the Green Thorn Tree, 1947
  - The Wonder of all the Gay World, 1949
  - The Crest of the Broken Wave, 1953
  - Bonnie Jean, 1959
- The Merry Muses of Caledonia: A Collection of Bawdy Folksongs, Ancient and Modern (with Sydney Goodsir Smith & John DeLancey Ferguson)
