= Robert J. Lurtsema =

American public radio broadcaster (1931–2000)

Robert John Lurtsema (November 14, 1931 – June 12, 2000) was a public radio broadcaster.

Lurtsema hosted the classical music show Morning Pro Musica on radio station WGBH (FM) in Boston, Massachusetts, from 1971 until his death in 2000. He was known among public radio listeners throughout New England for his sonorous voice (which was "described as having the quality of warm fudge") and his phrasing, which frequently included long pauses. The pauses, anathema to mainstream radio, were either tolerated or loved by his loyal listeners. He said: "I'm not afraid of dead air. I don't think there's anything wrong with a quiet spot once in a while. When I pause I'm visualizing my audience, the person I'm speaking to. I always imagine I'm speaking to someone in particular."

Lurtsema also performed a great deal of voiceover work, especially for public-television documentaries and classical pieces with narration. He was featured as a reader in several of the Revels' recordings.

In addition to his work in radio, Lurtsema was a composer. In 1975, he was awarded a lifetime scholarship at the New England Conservatory of Music, where he began to study composition and theory. Among the songs, chamber works and film scores that he wrote is music for a bassoon quartet that became the theme music for the TV show Julia Child and Company.

Known as "Robert J." or simply "Lurtz," Lurtsema began his WGBH program in 1971, broadcasting seven days a week, five hours a day. He had originally been hired for just the weekends, but when the weekday job opened, Lurtsema accepted it while continuing on weekends. This schedule lasted for 23 years, after which he was heard only on weekends.

Lurtsema arranged many surveys of composers. For example, he might play all the string quartets by Beethoven or Dvorák in order of composition at the same time each weekday. As he had not been exposed to classical music as a child, Lurtsema maintained an awareness that listeners may not possess knowledge of the music and its composers. He said that he learned along with his listeners. One morning, he devoted his full five hours to playing "Twinkle, Twinkle, Little Star" in all of the variations that he could find.

Lurtsema's signature opening pieces, one for each day of the week, were preceded by his own recordings of chirping birds. Ottorino Respighi's Ancient Airs and Dances Suite and one of Giovanni Gabrieli's triple-brass quintets were among his opening themes. The show closed with Mozart's Sinfonia Concertante for Four Winds (K. 297b).

In addition to his calm manner, Lurtsema displayed a subtle sense of humor. On April Fools' Day 1982, he stood in for the singing birds with his own deadpan chirping, and on April Fools' Day 1992, the birds were replaced by howling wolves. Aware of his reputation for long pauses, on another April Fools' Day Lurtsema presented selections of his "best pauses." On the morning after the presidential election of 1980, Lurtsema joked that "there is no news worth reporting this morning" and proceeded with the program.

On the morning of April 5, 1985, Lurtsema joined more than 8,000 other radio stations in a simultaneous broadcast of the song "We Are the World"

Starting in 1995, Lurtsema and his production team traveled to Seranak Mansion at Tanglewood Music Center for the Boston Symphony Orchestra's opening weekend of the summer season. From the mansion, Morning Pro Musica featured interviews and live performances with Seiji Ozawa, Roger Norrington, Boje Shovus, Claudio Abbado, Gil Shaham, Emmanuel Ax, John Williams, Arlo Guthrie, Maurice Abravanel and many others.

Lurtsema also narrated an episode of the science show Nova titled "Where Did the Colorado Go?," first aired on March 10, 1974, and later on the BBC.

Lurtsema died in 2000 from idiopathic pulmonary fibrosis. Betsy Northrup, his romantic partner of ten years, survived him. He also left a mother, two sisters and a brother.
