= Literature in modern Scotland =

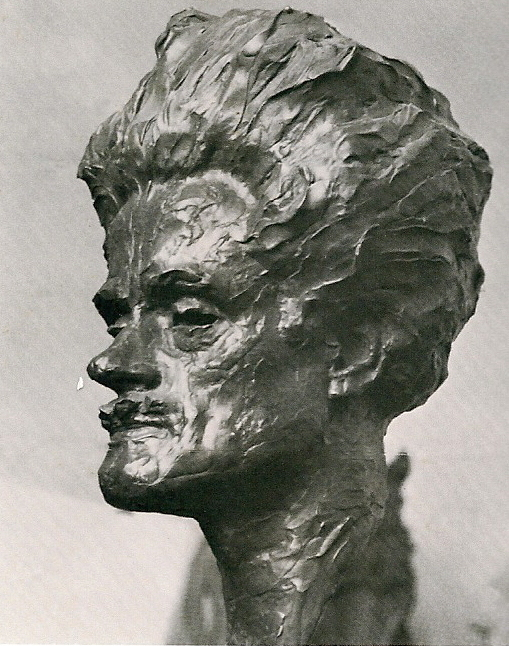
A sculpture of Hugh MacDiarmid, the major figure in the Scottish Literary Renaissance

Literature in modern Scotland is literature written in Scotland, or by Scottish writers, since the beginning of the twentieth century. It includes literature written in English, Scottish Gaelic and Scots in forms including poetry, novels, drama and the short story.

In the early twentieth century there was a new surge of activity in Scottish literature, influenced by modernism and resurgent nationalism, known as the Scottish Renaissance. The leading figure, Hugh MacDiarmid, attempted to revive the Scots language as a medium for serious literature in poetic works including "A Drunk Man Looks at the Thistle" (1926), developing a form of Synthetic Scots. Other writers connected with the movement included Edwin Muir and William Soutar. Writers that emerged after the Second World War writing in Scots included Robert Garioch and Sydney Goodsir Smith. Those working in English included Norman MacCaig, George Bruce, Maurice Lindsay and George Mackay Brown. The parallel revitalisation of Gaelic poetry, known as the Scottish Gaelic Renaissance was largely due to the work of Sorley Maclean. The generation of poets that grew up in the postwar period included Douglas Dunn, Tom Leonard, Liz Lochhead. The 1980s and 1990s saw the emergence of a new generation of Scottish poets that became leading figures on the UK stage, including Don Paterson, Robert Crawford, Carol Ann Duffy, Kathleen Jamie and Jackie Kay.

Among the most important novels of the early twentieth century was The House with the Green Shutters by George Douglas Brown, which broke with the Kailyard tradition. John Buchan played a major role in the creation of the modern thriller with The Thirty-Nine Steps and Greenmantle. The Scottish Renaissance increasingly focused on the novel. Major figures included Neil Gunn, George Blake, A. J. Cronin, Eric Linklater and Lewis Grassic Gibbon. There were also a large number of female authors associated with the movement, who included Catherine Carswell, Willa Muir, Nan Shepherd and Naomi Mitchison. Many major Scottish post-war novelists, such as Robin Jenkins, Jessie Kesson, Muriel Spark, Alexander Trocchi and James Kennaway spent most of their lives outside Scotland, but often dealt with Scottish themes. Successful mass-market works included the action novels of Alistair MacLean and the historical fiction of Dorothy Dunnett. A younger generation of novelists that emerged in the 1960s and 1970s included Allan Massie, Shena Mackay and Alan Spence. Working class identity continued to be explored by Archie Hind, Alan Sharp, George Friel and William McIlvanney. From the 1980s Scottish literature enjoyed another major revival, with figures including Alasdair Gray, James Kelman, Irvine Welsh, Alan Warner, Janice Galloway, A. L. Kennedy, Iain Banks, Andrew Crumey, Candia McWilliam, Frank Kuppner and Andrew O'Hagan. In genre fiction Iain Banks, writing as Iain M. Banks, produced ground-breaking science fiction and Scottish crime fiction has been a major area of growth with the success of novelists including Frederic Lindsay, Quintin Jardine, Val McDermid, Denise Mina, Christopher Brookmyre, and particularly Ian Rankin and his Inspector Rebus novels. The most successful author of Scottish origins in recent years has been J. K. Rowling, author of the Harry Potter series.

J. M. Barrie is often linked to the Kailyard tradition. His early plays deal with temporary inversions of the normal social order and his later works focus on historical themes. After Barrie the most successful Scottish playwrights of the early twentieth century were John Brandane and James Bridie. Bridie was a prolific playwright and a major figure in developing modern Scottish drama. The early twentieth century saw the emergence of a tradition of popular or working class theatre. Hundreds of amateur groups were established, particularly in the growing urban centres of the Lowlands. Amateur companies encouraged native playwrights, including Robert McLellan. The shift to drama that focused on working class life in the post-war period gained momentum with Robert McLeish's The Gorbals Story and the work of Ena Lamont Stewart, Robert Kemp and George Munro. A Scottish theatrical renaissance has been perceived between 1963 and 1971. In the 1970s a large number of plays explored the nature of Scottish identity, including the work of Stewart Conn, Hector Macmillan, Bill Bryden and Roddy McMillan. A new form of independent and politically committed community theatre was begun by 7:84 with their 1973 production of John McGrath's (1935–2002) The Cheviot, the Stag, and the Black Black Oil. The 1960s and 1970s also saw the flourishing of Scottish Gaelic drama, with key figures including Iain Crichton Smith, Tormod Calum Dòmhnallach, Fionnlagh MacLeòid, Donaidh MacIlleathain and Iain Moireach. The political and funding climate changed radically in the 1980s. The Scottish Theatre Company achieved critical success but suffered financial setbacks. By the last two decades of the twentieth century a substantial body of Scottish theatrical writing had built up. Now multiple companies drew on a community of writers. Scottish play writing became increasingly internationalised, with Scottish writers such as Liz Lochhead and Edwin Morgan adapting classic texts, while Jo Clifford and David Greig investigated European themes.

== Poetry ==
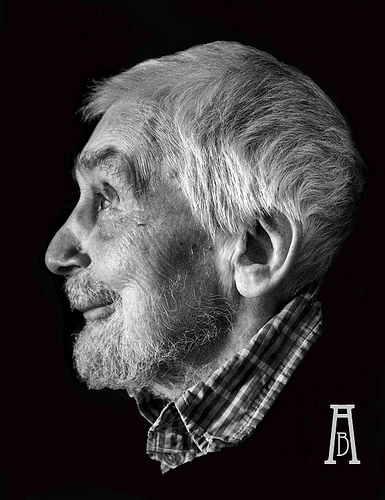
Edwin Morgan, poet, playwright and the first official Scott Makar

In the early twentieth century there was a new surge of activity in Scottish literature, influenced by modernism and resurgent nationalism, known as the Scottish Renaissance. The leading figure in the movement was Hugh MacDiarmid (the pseudonym of Christopher Murray Grieve, 1892–1978). MacDiarmid attempted to revive the Scots language as a medium for serious literature in poetic works including "A Drunk Man Looks at the Thistle" (1926), developing a form of Synthetic Scots that combined different regional dialects and archaic terms. Other writers that emerged in this period, and are often treated as part of the movement, include the poets Edwin Muir (1887–1959) and William Soutar (1898–1943), who pursued an exploration of identity, rejecting nostalgia and parochialism and engaging with social and political issues. Some writers that emerged after the Second World War followed MacDiarmid by writing in Scots, including Robert Garioch (1909–81) and Sydney Goodsir Smith (1915–75). Others demonstrated a greater interest in English language poetry, among them Norman MacCaig (1910–96), George Bruce (1909–2002) and Maurice Lindsay (1918–2009). George Mackay Brown (1921–96) from Orkney, wrote both poetry and prose fiction shaped by his distinctive island background. The Glaswegian poet Edwin Morgan (1920–2010) became known for translations of works from a wide range of European languages. He was also the first Scots Makar (the official national poet), appointed by the inaugural Scottish government in 2004.

The parallel revitalisation of Gaelic poetry, known as the Scottish Gaelic Renaissance was largely due to the work of Sorley Maclean (Somhairle MacGill-Eain, 1911–96). A native of Skye and a native Gaelic speaker, he abandoned the stylistic conventions of the tradition and opened up new possibilities for composition with his poem Dàin do Eimhir (Poems to Eimhir, 1943). His work inspired a new generation to take up nea bhardachd (the new poetry). These included George Campbell Hay (Deòrsa Mac Iain Dheòrsa, 1915–1984), Lewis-born poets Derick Thomson (Ruaraidh MacThòmais, 1921–2012) and Iain Crichton Smith (Iain Mac a' Ghobhainn, 1928–98). They all focused on the issues of exile, the fate of the Gaelic language and bi-culturalism.

The generation of poets that grew up in the postwar period included Douglas Dunn (b. 1942), whose work has often seen a coming to terms with class and national identity within the formal structures of poetry and commenting on contemporary events, as in Barbarians (1979) and Northlight (1988). His most personal work is contained in the collection of Elegies (1985), which deal with the death of his first wife from cancer. Tom Leonard (b. 1944), works in the Glaswegian dialect, pioneering the working class voice in Scottish poetry, although what has been described as his finest work "A priest came on at Merkland Street" is in English. Like his friend Leonard, Aonghas MacNeacail (Angus Nicolson, b. 1942), amongst the most prominent post-war Gaelic poets, was influenced by new American poetry, particularly the Black Mountain School. Liz Lochhead (b. 1947) also explored the lives of working-class people of Glasgow, but added an appreciation of female voices within a sometimes male dominated society. The 1980s and 1990s saw the emergence of a new generation of Scottish poets that became leading figures on the UK stage, including Don Paterson (b. 1953), Robert Crawford (b. 1959), Carol Ann Duffy (b. 1955), Kathleen Jamie (b. 1962) and Jackie Kay (b. 1961). Dundonians Paterson and Crawford have both produced esoteric work, which includes Paterson's ironically self-aware verse and Crawford's a metaphorically colourful re-imagining of Scottish history. Kathleen Jamie has explored female aspirations, drawing on her experiences growing up in rural Renfrewshire and Jackie Kay has drawn on her experiences as a black child adopted by a working class Glasgow family. Glasgow-born Duffy was named as Poet Laureate in May 2009, the first woman, the first Scot and the first openly gay poet to take the post. A new group of Scottish poets have come up, chief among them is Bashabi Fraser. Fraser's poetry tries to see Scotland as it is; a hospitable land where everyone is welcome.

== Novels ==
Among the most important novels of the early twentieth century was The House with the Green Shutters (1901) by George Douglas Brown (1869–1902), a realist work that broke with the Kailyard tradition to depict modern Scottish society, using Scots language and disregarding nostalgia. Also important was the work of John Buchan (1875–1940), who played a major role in the creation of the modern thriller with The Thirty-Nine Steps (1915) and Greenmantle (1916). His prolific output included the historical novel Witchwood (1927), set in seventeenth-century Scotland, and the posthumously published Sick Heart River (1941), a study of physiological breakdown in the wilderness of Canada (of which Buchan was governor general from 1936 until his death). His work was an important link between the tradition of Scot and Stevenson and the Scottish Renaissance.

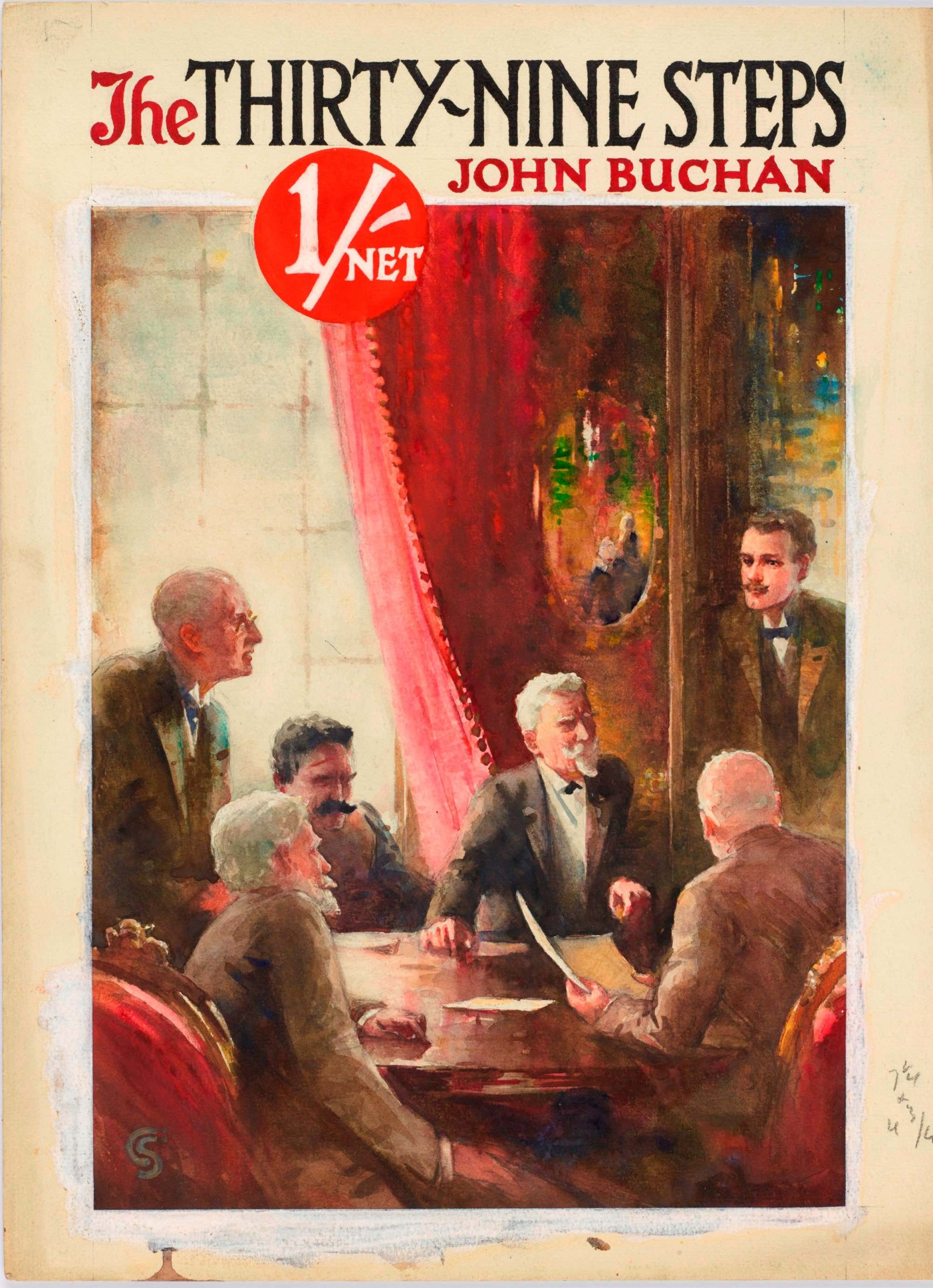
The first edition of John Buchan's The Thirty-Nine Steps (1915), which played a major role in the creation of the modern thriller

The Scottish Renaissance increasingly concentrated on the novel, particularly after the 1930s when Hugh MacDiarmid was living in isolation in Shetland and its leadership moved to novelist Neil Gunn (1891–1973). Gunn's novels, beginning with The Grey Coast (1926), and including Highland River (1937) and The Green Isle of the Great Deep (1943), were largely written in English and not the Scots preferred by MacDiarmid, focused on the Highlands of his birth and were notable for their narrative experimentation. Other major figures associated with the movement include George Blake (1893–1961), A. J. Cronin (1896–1981), Eric Linklater (1899–1974) and Lewis Grassic Gibbon (1901–35). There were also a large number of female authors associated with the movement, who demonstrated a growing feminine consciousness. They included Catherine Carswell (1879–1946), Willa Muir (1890–1970), Nan Shepherd (1893–1981) and most prolifically Naomi Mitchison (1897–1999). All were born within a fifteen-year period and, although they cannot be described as members of a single school, they all pursued an exploration of identity, rejecting nostalgia and parochialism and engaging with social and political issues. Physician A. J. Cronin is now often seen as sentimental, but his early work, particularly his first novel Hatter's Castle (1931) and his most successful The Citadel (1937) were a deliberate reaction against the Kailyard tradition, exposing the hardships and vicissitudes of the lives of ordinary people. He was the most translated Scottish author in the twentieth century. George Blake pioneered the exploration of the experiences of the working class in his major works such as The Shipbuilders (1935). Eric Linklater produced comedies of the absurd including Juan in America (1931) dealing with prohibition America, and a critique of modern war in Private Angelo (1946). Lewis Grassic Gibbon, the pseudonym of James Leslie Mitchell, produced one of the most important realisations of the ideas of the Scottish Renaissance in his trilogy A Scots Quair (Sunset Song, 1932, Cloud Howe, 1933 and Grey Granite, 1934), which mixed different Scots dialects with the narrative voice. Other works that investigated the working class included James Barke's (1905–58), Major Operation (1936) and The Land of the Leal (1939) and J. F. Hendry's (1912–86) Fernie Brae (1947).

World War II had a greater impact on the novel than in poetry. It ended the careers of some novelists and delayed the start of others. Many major Scottish post-war novelists, such as Robin Jenkins (1912–2005), Jessie Kesson (1916–94), Muriel Spark (1918–2006), Alexander Trocchi (1925–84) and James Kennaway (1928–68) spent much or most of their lives outside Scotland, but often dealt with Scottish themes. Jenkins major novels such as The Cone Gatherers (1955), The Changeling (1958) and Fergus Lamont (1978) focused on working-class dilemmas in a world without spiritual consolation. Very different in tone, Spark produced novels that explored modern social life as in her only two overtly Scottish novels The Ballad of Peckham Rye (1960) and the Edinburgh-set The Prime of Miss Jean Brodie (1961). Successful mass-market works included the action novels of Alistair MacLean (1922–87), and the historical fiction of Dorothy Dunnett (b. 1923). A younger generation of novelists that emerged in the 1960s and 1970s included Allan Massie (b. 1938), Shena Mackay (b. 1944) and Alan Spence (b. 1947). Massie's work often deals with historical themes while aware of the limitations of historical objectivity, as in his Augustus (1986), Tiberius (1991) and The Ragged Lion (1994). Working class identity continued to be a major theme in the post-war novel and can be seen in Archie Hind's (1928–2008) The Dear Green Place (1966), Alan Sharp's (1934–2013) A Green Tree in Gedde (1965), George Friel's (1910–75) Mr Alfred M.A. (1972) and William McIlvanney's (b. 1936) Docherty (1975).

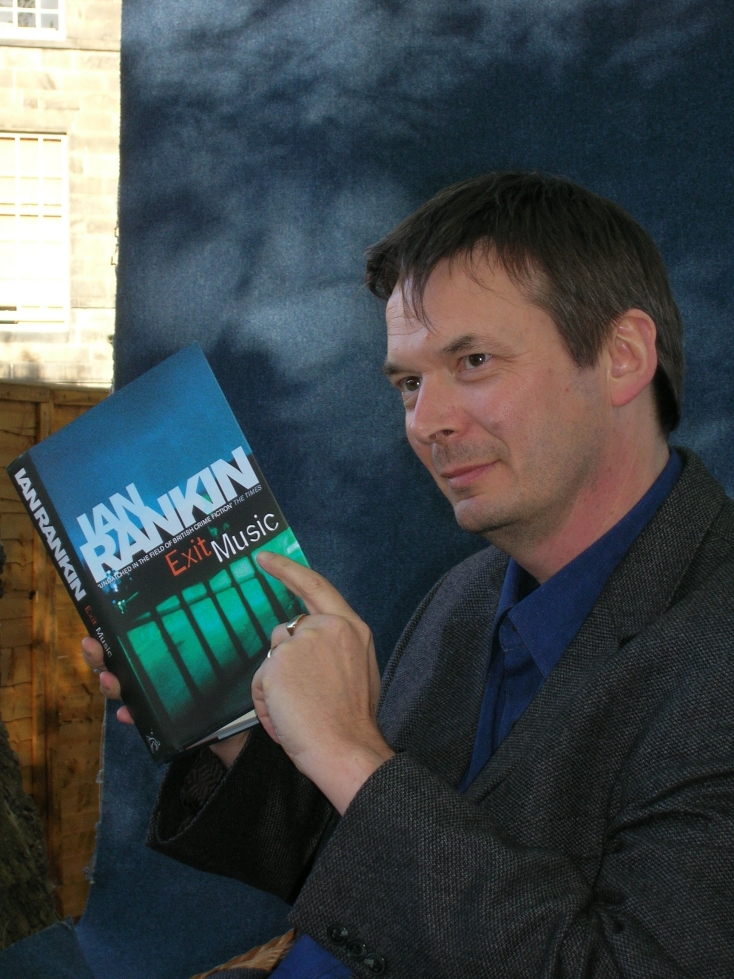
Ian Rankin with the final volume in his Inspector Rebus series in 2007

From the 1980s Scottish literature enjoyed another major revival, particularly associated with a group of Glasgow writers focused around meetings in the house of critic, poet and teacher Philip Hobsbaum (1932–2005). Also important in the movement was Peter Kravitz, editor of Polygon Books. These included Alasdair Gray (b. 1934), whose epic Lanark (1981) built on the working class novel to explore realistic and fantastic narratives. James Kelman’s (b. 1946) The Busconductor Hines (1984) and A Disaffection (1989) were among the first novels to fully utilise a working class Scots voice as the main narrator. In the 1990s major, prize winning, Scottish novels that emerged from this movement included Gray's Poor Things (1992), which investigated the capitalist and imperial origins of Scotland in an inverted version of the Frankenstein myth, Irvine Welsh's (b. 1958), Trainspotting (1993), which dealt with the drug addiction in 1980s Leith, Edinburgh, Alan Warner’s (b. 1964) Morvern Callar (1995), dealing with death and authorship and Kelman's How Late It Was, How Late (1994), a stream of consciousness novel dealing with a life of petty crime. These works were linked by a reaction to Thatcherism that was sometimes overtly political, and explored marginal areas of experience using vivid vernacular language (including expletives and Scots dialect).

Other notable authors to gain prominence in this period included Janice Galloway (b. 1956) with work such as The Trick is to Keep Breathing (1989) and Foreign Parts (1994); A. L. Kennedy (b. 1965) with Looking for the Possible Dance (1993) and So I Am Glad (1995); Iain Banks (1954–2013) with The Crow Road (1992) and Complicity (1993); Candia McWilliam (b. 1955) with Debatable land (1994); Frank Kuppner (b. 1951) with Something Very Like Murder (1994); and Andrew O'Hagan (b. 1968) with Our Fathers (1999). In genre fiction Iain Banks, writing as Iain M. Banks, produced ground-breaking science fiction. Scottish crime fiction, known as Tartan Noir, has been a major area of growth with the success of novelists including Frederic Lindsay (1933–2013), Quintin Jardine (b. 1945), Val McDermid (b. 1955), Denise Mina (b. 1966), Christopher Brookmyre (b. 1968), and particularly the success of Edinburgh's Ian Rankin (b. 1960) and his Inspector Rebus novels. The most successful author of Scottish origins in recent years has been J. K. Rowling (b. 1965), author of the Harry Potter children's fantasy novels.

== Drama ==
J. M. Barrie (1860–1937) was amongst the most successful of Scottish literary exports, spending most of his career in England. His Peter Pan (1904), which began life as a play, is one best known stories in English. Barrie is often linked to the Kailyard movement and his early plays such as Quality Street (1901) and The Admirable Crichton (1902) deal with temporary inversions of the normal social order. His later works, such as Dear Brutus (1917) and Mary Rose (1920), focused on historical themes. After Barrie the most successful Scottish playwrights of the early twentieth century were John Brandane and James Bridie, the pseudonyms, respectively, of doctors John Macintyre (1869–1947) and Osborne Mavor (1888–1951). Brandane's plays were often humorous explorations of the clash between modernity and tradition in Highland society, as in The Glen is Mine (1925). Bridie emerged as a prolific playwright and a major figure in developing modern Scottish drama. As well as drawing on his medical experience, as in The Anatomist (1930), his plays included middle class satires such as The Sunlight Sonata (1928) and often called on biblical characters such as devils and angels, as in Mr. Bolfry (1943). He was a member of the Scottish National Players (1924–43), who performed several of his plays and which aimed to produce a Scottish national theatre, but his view that they should become a professional company meant he resigned from the board. He was a founder and first president of the Glasgow Citizens' Theatre (1943), a member of the body that became the Scottish Arts Council and was its first President (1947). He founded the College of Drama within the Royal Scottish Academy of Music, Glasgow (1951).

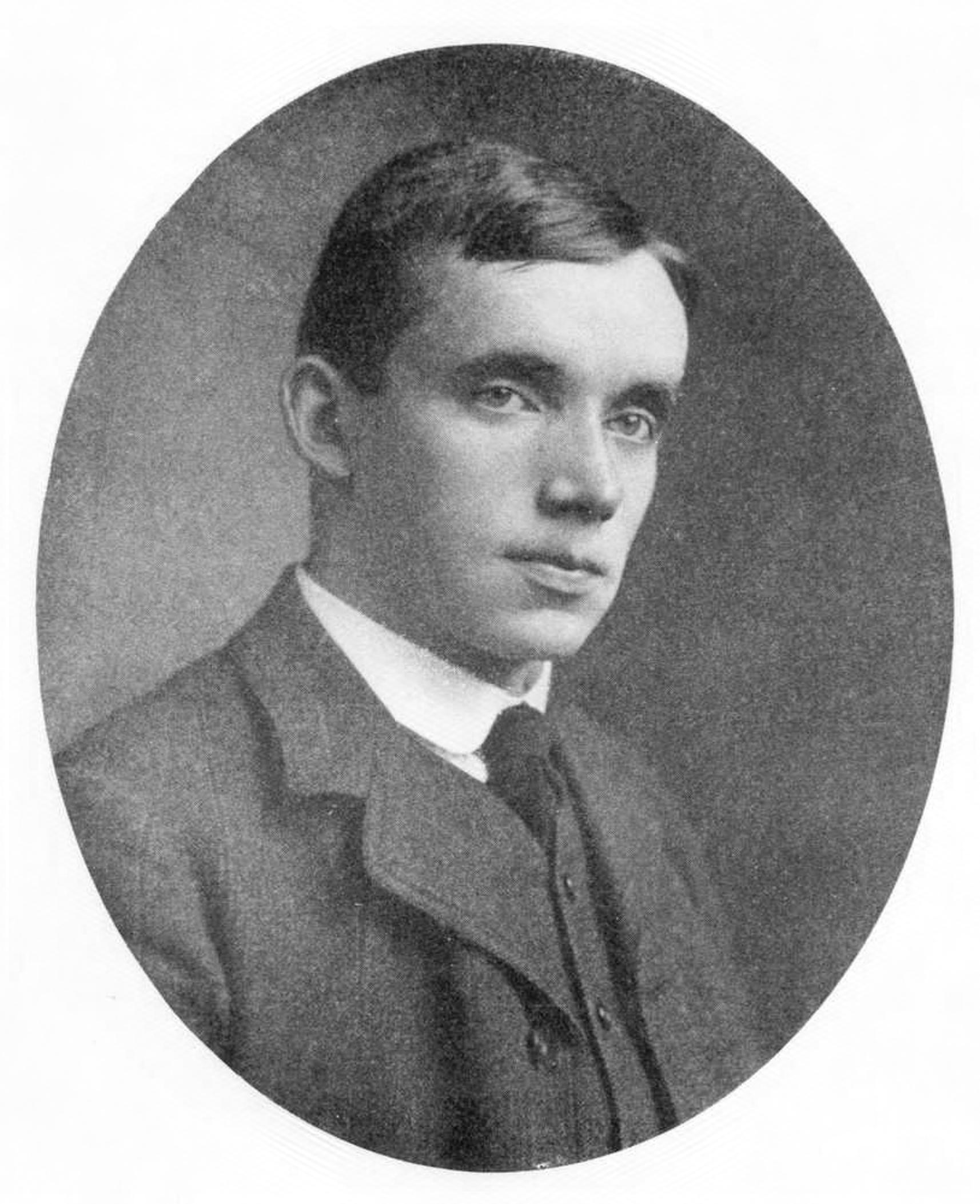
James Bridie, one of the leading figures in Scottish theatre in the early twentieth century

The early twentieth century saw the emergence of a tradition of popular or working class theatre. Hundreds of amateur groups were established, particularly in the growing urban centres of the Lowlands. Many were offshoots of the Workers' Theatre Movement (WTM) and the Unity Theatre Society (UTS). Among the most important were the Fife Miner Players (1926–31), Glasgow Workers' Theatre Group (1937–41) and Glasgow Unity Theatre (1941–51), which lay the ground for modern popular theatre groups. Important playwrights in the movement included former miner Joe Corrie (1894–1968), whose plays included In Time o' Strife (1927), based on the events of the general strike the year before. The Scottish Repertory Theatre was the first Scottish company to encourage native playwrights. In the interwar period its aim was taken up by other amateur companies, particularly the Curtain Theatre, Glasgow, who "discovered" the work of Robert McLellan (1907–85), including his first full-length play Toom Byers (1936) and his best known work Jamie the Saxt (1936). A talented comic dramatist, his commitment to the use of Lallans limited his impact on the wider theatrical world.

The shift to drama that focused on working class life in the post-war period gained momentum with Robert McLeish's The Gorbals Story (1946), which dealt with the immense social problems of urban Scotland. Similarly, Ena Lamont Stewart's Men Should Weep (1947) focused on the impact of the depression in Scotland. Other major Scottish playwrights of the era included Robert Kemp (1908–67), who produced work including The Heart is Highland (1959), and George Munro (1902–68) whose plays included Vineyard Street (1949).

The Edinburgh Festival was founded in 1947 as a substitute for festivals at Glyndebourne, Munich and Salzburg, which could not be held in the aftermath of World War II. The Edinburgh Festival Fringe began when eight theatre companies, who had not been included in the programme, organised their own performances in small and converted theatres. Until the 1960s relations with between the two co-existing festivals were strained. Together they are now the largest, and among the most prestigious, arts festivals in the world, and have included large and small-scale theatrical productions.

A Scottish theatrical renaissance has been perceived by Ian Brown as occurring between the opening of the Traverse Theatre in Edinburgh in 1963 and the foundation of the Scottish Society of Playwrights in 1973. The Theatres Act 1968 abolished the system of censorship of the stage by the Lord Chamberlain that had existed in Great Britain since 1737. This allowed much greater artistic freedom, but local authorities in Scotland still retained the ability to prosecute "obscene performances" under local by-laws and statutes.

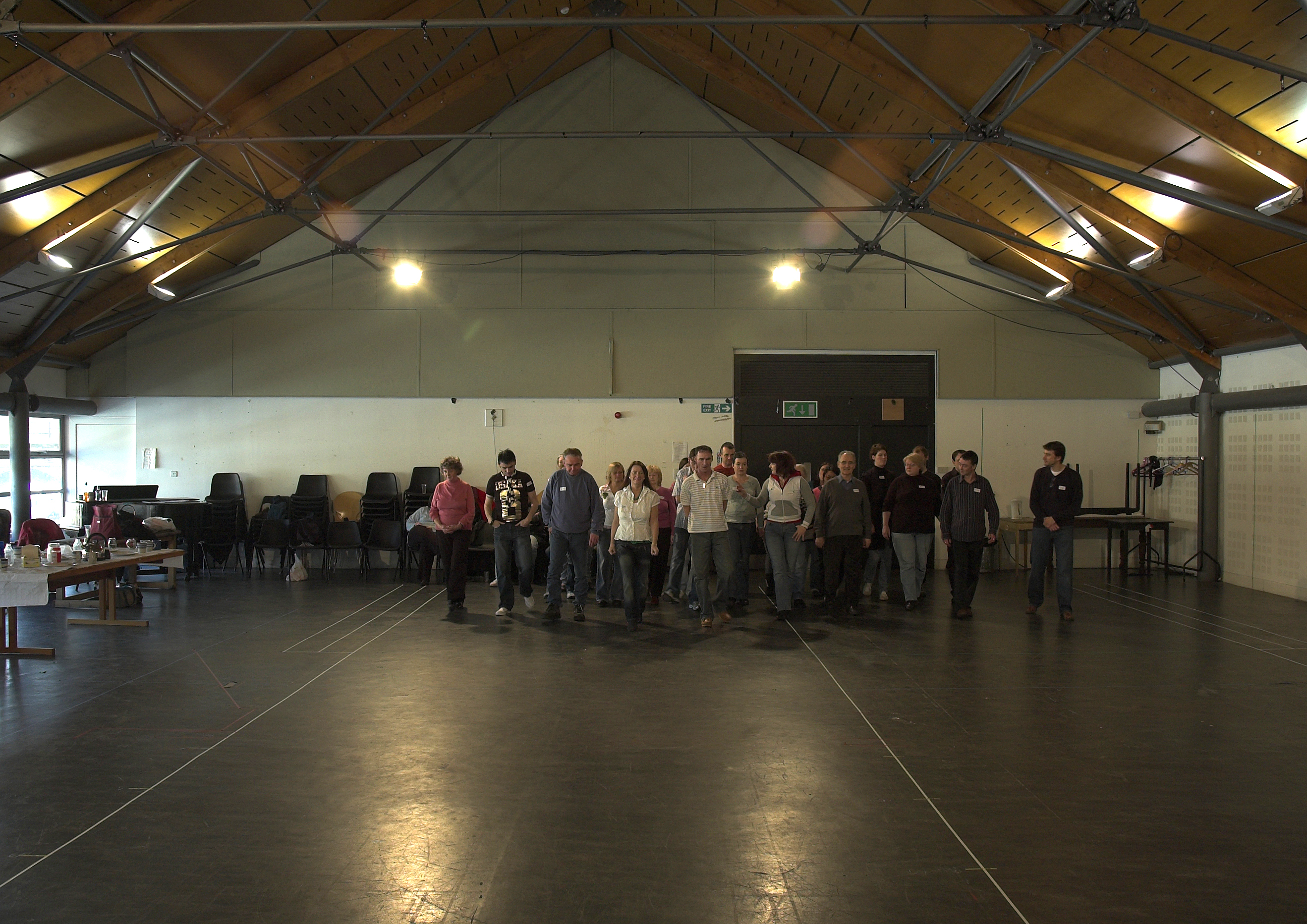
Rehearsal room at the Citizens Theatre in Glasgow

In the 1970s a large number of plays explored the nature of Scottish identity. Historical dramas included Stewart Conn's (b. 1936) The Burning (1971) and Hector Macmillan's (b. 1929) The Rising (1973). Workplace dramas included Bill Bryden's (b. 1942) Willy Rough (1975) and Roddy McMillan's The Bevellers (1973). These plays opened the way for a new form of independent and politically committed community theatre. The trend was kicked off by 7:84 (1971–2008), with their 1973 production of John McGrath's (1935–2002) The Cheviot, the Stag, and the Black Black Oil. McGrath's work, such as The Game's a Bogey (1974), was socialist in intent and took the part of resurgent Scottish nationalism. Independent theatre companies that formed along the lines of this model included TAG (1967–), Borderline Theatre Company (1974–) and Wildcat Stage Productions (1978–).

The 1960s and 1970s also saw the flourishing of Scottish Gaelic drama. Key figures included Iain Crichton Smith, whose plays explored wide-ranging themes. Often humorous, they also dealt with serious topics such as the betrayal of Christ in An Coileach (A Cockerel, 1966) of the Highland Clearances in A' Chùirt (The Court, 1966). Iain Moireach's plays also used humour to deal with serious subjects, as in Feumaidh Sinn a Bhith Gàireachdainn (We Have to Laugh, 1969), which focused on threats to the Gaelic language. Other major figures included Tormod Calum Dòmhnallach (1927–2000), whose work included Anna Chaimbeul (Anna Campbell, 1977), which was influenced by Japanese Noh theatre. Fionnlagh MacLeòid's (Finley Macleod) work included Ceann Cropic (1967), which was strongly influenced by the theatre of the absurd. Similarly, Donaidh MacIlleathain (Donnie Maclean), made use of absurd dialogue in An Sgoil Dhubh (A Dark School, 1974). Many of these authors continued writing into the 1980s and even the 1990s, but this was something of a golden age for Gaelic drama that has not been matched.

The political and funding climate changed radically after the failure of the devolution referendum of 1979 and the election of a Conservative government under Margaret Thatcher. The Scottish Arts Council encouraged theatre companies to function as business, finding funding in ticket sales and commercial sponsorship. In 1981 the actor Ewan Hooper was given £50,000 to found the Scottish Theatre Company based in Glasgow and designed to promote the work of Scottish writers. The company found touring difficult as there were insufficient large venues that could generate the necessary income outside of the major cities. Works in the first season included McGrath's Animal (1979) and Bryden's Civilians (1981). Artistic successes were accompanied by financial disaster and the company was £120,000 in debt by the end of its second season. Despite some critical triumphs, the company was wound down in 1987. 7:84 also encountered a period of financial instability, but new structures, new management and an emphasis on encouraging new writing led to works such as Rona Munro's (b. 1959) Bold Girls (1990). By the last two decades of the twentieth century a substantial body of Scottish theatrical writing had built up. There was also a change from a habit of one writer working with one company to several companies drawing on a community of writers. Scottish play writing became increasingly internationalised, with Scottish writers adapting classic texts such Liz Lochhead's version of Molière's Tartuffe (1985) and The Misanthrope (1973/2005) or Edwin Morgan's translation of Cyrano de Bergerac (1992). Scottish playwrights were also increasingly preoccupied with wider European culture, as can be seen in Jo Clifford's (b. 1955) Losing Venice (1985) and David Greig's (b. 1969) Europe (1995).
