= Isobel Murray =

Scottish literary scholar

Isobel Murray is a Scottish literary scholar, Emeritus Professor at the University of Aberdeen. She edited the work of Oscar Wilde and Naomi Mitchison. She also edited a series of interviews which she and her husband Bob Tait carried out with Scottish writers, and wrote a biography of the writer Jessie Kesson.

== Life ==
Murray gained her MA at Edinburgh University. She then went to the University of Aberdeen, where she became a senior lecturer and eventually professor. In 1976 she married fellow academic Bob Tait. The couple "formed a pair of literary lions, hosting memorable parties and discussions at their flat for guests such as novelists Archie Hind and William McIlvanney, who became the university’s first writer in residence at their suggestion."

Murray's 2000 biography of Jessie Kesson won the National Library of Scotland / Saltire Society Scottish Research Book of the Year award.

== Works ==
- (ed.) The picture of Dorian Gray by Oscar Wilde. Oxford: Oxford University Press, 1974.
- (ed.) Complete shorter fiction by Oscar Wilde. Oxford: Oxford University Press, 1979.
- (with Bob Tait) Ten modern Scottish novels. Aberdeen: Aberdeen University Press, 1984.
- (ed.) Beyond this limit: selected shorter fiction of Naomi Mitchison by Naomi Mitchison. Edinburgh : Scottish Academic Press, 1986.
- (ed.) The soul of man, and prison writings. Oxford: Oxford University Press, 1989.
- (ed.) Scottish writers talking: George Mackay Brown, Jessie Kesson, Norman MacCaig, William McIlvanney, David Toulmin. East Linton, East Lothian: Tuckwell Press, 1996.
- (ed.) Complete poetry by Oscar Wilde. Oxford: Oxford University Press, 1997.
- Jessie Kesson: writing her life. Edinburgh: Canongate, 2000.
- (ed.) Oscar Wilde: the major works by Oscar Wilde. Ocford: Oxford University Press, 2000.
- (ed.) Scottish writers talking 2: Iain Banks, Bernard Maclaverty, Naomi Mitchison, Iain Crichton Smith, Alan Spence in interview. East Linton, East Lothian: Tuckwell Press, 2002.
- (ed.) Scottish writers talking 3: interviews with Janice Galloway, John Herdman, Robin Jenkins, Joan Lingard, Ali Smith. Edinburgh: John Donald, 2006.
- (ed.) Scottish writers talking 4: Jackie Kay, Allan Massie, Ian Rankin, James Robertson, William (Bill) Watson. Glasgow: Kennedy & Boyd, 2008.
- Scottish novels of the Second World War. Edinburgh: WP Books, 2011.
