= Jill Rips =

2000 film directed by Anthony Hickox

- Official DVD cover
- Directed by: Anthony Hickox
- Written by: Gareth Wardell; Kevin Bernhardt
- Produced by: Jim Wynorski; Tracee Stanley; Damian Lee
- Starring: Dolph Lundgren; Danielle Brett
- Cinematography: David Pelletier
- Edited by: Brett Hedlund
- Music by: Thomas Barquee; Steve Gurevitch
- Production companies: Phoenician Entertainment; Annex Entertainment
- Distributed by: Sony Pictures Home Entertainment
- Release date: 2000
- Running time: 94 minutes
- Country: United States
- Language: English

Jill Rips (also known as Jill the Ripper and Tied Up) is a 2000 American film directed by Anthony Hickox starring Dolph Lundgren, based on a 1987 novel by Scottish writer Frederic Lindsay.

== Plot ==
In 1977 Boston, Matt Sorenson, a former police officer who moved across country, returns for the funeral of his high-powered younger brother Michael. His body is found washed ashore, tied up in a manner suggesting bondage play, with a brutal series of cuts and stabs, some made after death. Intent on finding his brother's killer, Sorenson initially believes a major construction magnate, "Big Jim" Conway, whom Michael opposed on a subway project, is responsible. He also finds himself drawn to Michael's widow, Irene, who was married to him for six months. After other men are found murdered in a similar fashion, and that they had been photographed with a masked sex worker, the investigation focuses on her, the media branding her "Jill the Ripper". Matt reluctantly immerses himself in the underground bondage and discipline scene, and discovers what has linked his brother's murder, Conway, and Irene together.

== Cast ==
- Dolph Lundgren as Matt Sorenson
- Danielle Brett as Irene
- Richard Fitzpatrick as Eddie
- Kristi Angus as Frances
- Charles Seixas as Jim "Big Jim" Conway
- Sandi Ross as Mary O.
- Greg Ellwand as Peerse
- Victor Pedtrchenko as Joe Jujavia
- Kylie Bax as Serena

== Release ==
=== Home media ===
After a TV premiere on HBO under the alternate title Tied Up in January 2000, the movie was released on DVD on July 4, 2000, by Columbia TriStar Home Entertainment as Jill the Ripper (while keeping its original title Jill Rips in other countries). In February 2024, Scream Factory released it as a limited run BluRay under its original Jill Rips title, as a website exclusive.
