= Anne Downie =

Scottish actress and writer (born 1939)

- Born: Anne Downie; 1939 (age 86–87); Glasgow, Scotland
- Occupations: Actress, writer

Anne Downie (born 1939) is a Scottish actress and writer. She was born in Glasgow to Scottish and Irish parents. She has written and performed across a wide variety of media.

== Acting career ==
Upon leaving drama college, her first professional stage role was playing opposite Andrew Keir in The Bigot. She has worked in many of the major Scottish theatres. Highlights from her theatre career include: Six Black Candles (Royal Lyceum, garnering the Critics Award for Best Ensemble), Tally's Blood (Traverse), Just Frank (Traverse), Can't Pay Won't Pay! (TAG), Marching On (7:84), and roles in pantomime with comedy legends Stanley Baxter and Jimmy Logan. She appeared as Granny Morrison in Josie Rourke's revival of Ena Lamont Stewart's Men Should Weep at the Royal National Theatre, London.

Television credits include: Glasgow Kiss (BBC), Taggart (STV), River City (BBC), Still Game (BBC), and a comic stand-up performance on two series of Halfway to Paradise (C4).

Her film credits include: 16 Years of Alcohol, Solstice, The Crews, and Running in Traffic (nominated for Michael Powell and BAFTA awards, screened at the Edinburgh International Festival and winner of the Apollo Prize).

== Writing career ==
Her published works of fiction include the short stories "Walter" (Polygon), "Deadly Sin" (Polygon and Argyle Press), "Write Your Name Small" (Herald), and "Do You do Teas?" (Edinburgh Review).

Her novel The Witches of Pollok was published by Capercaillie Books on 6 October 2010. Her novel 'The Miami Disclosure' was published by SNB Publishing on 9 January 2021.

She has also written non-fiction including: On Being an Actor (Chapman), China Diary (Herald) and On having Irish Roots (Argyle Press).

Her works as a playwright include: Waiting on One (winner of Thames Television award), published by Fairplay Press, 2007; The White Bird Passes (adapted from the novel by Jessie Kesson). Published by Fairplay Press, 2007 and The Female of The Species Published by Fairplay Press, 2007.

Her plays have been produced by companies such as Theatre Workshop, Perth and Borderline.

She has written for television series: High Road (STV), River City (BBC) and The Bill (Thames Television/ITV).

Downie's works for radio include Side Sea View (BBC Radio 4) and Race (series for BBC Radio Scotland), among others.
