= Dear Green Place (disambiguation) =

Dear Green Place is a television series set in Glasgow.

Dear Green Place may also refer to:

- The city of Glasgow, Scotland, of which "Dear Green Place" is a popular nickname
- The Dear Green Place, a novel by Archie Hind, which takes its title and setting from Glasgow
