= Fallen Gods =

Fallen Gods may refer to:

== Books ==
- Fallen Gods, a novel by Quintin Jardine, 2003
- Fallen Gods (novella), by Jonathan Blum and Kate Orman
- Fallen Gods, Star Trek: Titan, written by Michael A. Martin (2012)

== Other ==
- Fallen Gods (film) (Spanish: Los dioses rotos) a 2008 film by Cuban filmmaker Ernesto Daranas; see List of Cuban submissions for the Academy Award for Best Foreign Language Film
- Fallen Gods, an album by Rapoon (1994)
