= The Loner (Jardine novel) =

2011 novel by Quintin Jardine

- Author: Quintin Jardine
- Language: English
- Genre: Crime novel, thriller
- Publisher: Headline
- Publication date: 31 March 2011
- Publication place: Scotland
- Media type: Print (hardback and paperback)
- Pages: 448 pp
- ISBN: 0755357167
- OCLC: 48999242

The Loner is a 2011 crime/thriller novel by Scottish writer Quintin Jardine. Written as an autobiography, it is an account of the life of its principal character, Xavier 'Xavi' Aislado, a journalist with the fictional Edinburgh-based broadsheet, The Saltire. The book is a standalone novel, but features an appearance by Jardine's Edinburgh police detective, Bob Skinner. The Loner received generally positive reception from reviewers.

== Plot summary ==
The book is presented as a manuscript written by Aislado, which he has passed on to Jardine for him to ghost write.

Born in the early 1960s of Scottish and Catalan heritage (his mother is Scottish and his father Spanish), Xavi is raised in Edinburgh by his father Josip (Joe), and Joe's formidable mother, Paloma Puig, who were forced to leave Catalonia when Spain was gripped by the Civil War that saw General Franco's Fascists emerge as the ruling force. Paloma's grim brand of care sees Xavi into his teenage years, but after democracy is restored to Spain Paloma and Joe decide to return to that country, settling near Girona, and leaving Xavi in Scotland to complete his education. As a consequence, he is required to grow up fast.

After attending George Watson's College Xavi studies at Heriot-Watt University, while in Spain Joe Aislado buys a failing Catalan newspaper, Girona Dia and begins to improve its fortunes. Xavi embarks on a career as a professional footballer with Heart of Midlothian, where he is nicknamed 'Big Iceland' because of his 6 ft 7in frame, but after being introduced to journalism on a visit to his father's newspaper while holidaying in Spain, his ambition is to become a reporter. When his football career is abruptly ended by injury, Xavi is able to concentrate his efforts on his journalistic career, and following his graduation he secures a job with The Saltire, a failing nationalist broadsheet. He is given a bloody introduction to the trade when his first assignment exposes a drug-dealing racket at a local school. A number of exclusives follow as Xavi cuts his teeth, and he quickly establishes himself as one of Scotland's leading reporters, helping to increase The Saltire's circulation in the process.

Xavi meets his fiancé, the hypnotic Grace Starshine while at school, and they move in together as students, sharing a flat with close friends Scott Livingstone and Bobby Hannah. Xavi and Grace are later married. Inevitably, however, Xavi's life and his love become entwined with his work, and he is immersed in tragedy; firstly by the horrific murders of his in-laws during a robbery at their pharmaceutical company, and later by the death of his wife. With the help of Edinburgh detective Bob Skinner, and through his loss and the betrayal of those closest to him, Xavi is forced to travel to a distant shore in search of the truth.

== Main characters ==
- Xavier 'Xavi' Aislado – Professional footballer and journalist, and the book's central character. He is of Scottish and Catalan heritage.
- Joe Aislado – Xavi's father. Edinburgh businessman who runs a chain of pubs, but later sells them to return to Spain, where he buys the newspaper Girona Dia
- Paloma Puig – Xavi's paternal grandmother who raises him. A Catalan woman forced to flee from Spain because of the Civil War.
- Grace Starshine – Xavi's fiancé and later his wife. Xavi first meets her while they are studying at George Watson's College. Her parents are Jewish.
- Scott Livingstone – A friend from George Watson's who later shares a student flat with Xavi.
- Bobby Hannah – A friend from George Watson's College who later shares a student flat with Xavi.
- Mary Partridge – Xavi's estranged mother, who left the family when he was a boy.
- Tommy Partridge – Xavi's stepfather and Mary's husband. A detective with Lothian and Borders Police.
- Rodney and Magda Starshine – Grace's parents.

== Reception ==
Pam Norfolk of the Lancashire Evening Post gave the book a very positive reception: "Packed with characters from every walk of life and a storyline that moves from the dark streets of Edinburgh's underbelly to the sunlit countryside of Spain, The Loner sees Jardine as his enigmatic best." However, reviewing The Loner for The Guardian, John O'Connell was generally unenthusiastic about its content: "For the most part it's a sentimental coming-of-age story narrated by Xavi (as he's known) with all the brio of a Christmas round-robin." The online crime and thriller ezine Shots was more positive, describing The Loner as a "book of two halves": "It foregoes pace and quick kicks in favour of a slow-burn that cleverly hides the shocks to come into its narrative... The Loner is a genre-defying novel, with a depth beyond the remit of many crime stories."
