= Debjani Chatterjee =

British poet (born 1952)

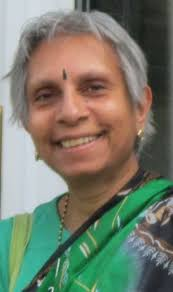
- Born: 21 November 1952 (age 74); Delhi, India
- Education: BA (High Hons), MA (English and American Literature), MA (Arts Psychotherapy Practice), PGCE (English, Drama & R.E.) and PhD
- Alma mater: American University in Cairo, University of Kent at Canterbury, University of Lancaster, Sheffield Hallam University, Leeds Beckett University
- Occupations: poet, writer, editor, translator, creative arts psychotherapist
- Spouse: Brian D'Arcy
- Writing career
- Notable works: I Was that Woman, Namaskar: New & Selected Poems, The Elephant-headed God and other Hindu tales, The Most Beautiful Child, Redbeck Anthology of British South-Asian Poetry, Who Cares:Reminiscences of Yemeni carers, Barbed Lines, Mango Shake
- Notable awards: MBE, Honorary Doctorate, FRSL
- Website: dchatterjeewriter.simplesite.com

Debjani Chatterjee MBE (born 21 November 1952) is an Indian-born British poet and writer. She lives in Sheffield, England.

== Life ==
Chatterjee was born in Delhi and has lived in India, Japan, Bangladesh, Hong Kong, Egypt, and Morocco, before coming to Britain in 1972. She attended seven schools and five universities, receiving a BA from the American University in Cairo, Egypt, MA degrees in English and American Literature from the University of Kent at Canterbury and in Arts Psychotherapy Practice from Leeds Beckett University, and a PhD from Lancaster University, as well as a PGCE and honorary doctorate from Sheffield Hallam University.

After completing her PhD in 1977, Chatterjee worked in the steel industry and in education. From 1984 to 1994 she was Director of Sheffield Racial Equality Council.

Chatterjee has written, translated, or edited more than 75 books, starting with the poetry collection I Was That Woman in 1989. Her books have been translated into several languages, including French, Welsh, Portuguese, Arabic, Bengali, Urdu, and Mandarin. She has won a number of prizes, including the Peterloo Poets Prize, and her book The Elephant-Headed God and Other Hindu Tales was selected for Children's Books of the Year in 1990.

In August 2010, Chatterjee contributed to an eBook collection of political poems entitled Emergency Verse - Poetry in Defence of the Welfare State edited by Alan Morrison.

She was appointed Member of the Order of the British Empire (MBE) in the 2008 New Year Honours. In 2012, she was an Olympic Torchbearer, carrying the torch from Sheffield to Rotherham.

Debjani Chatterjee was an Associate Editor of the cultural magazine, Pratibha India, in the 1990s and 2000s, published by Sneh Bharti Trust; and of Tadeeb International in the 2000s. she was Reviews Editor of Writing in Education in the 1990s and 2000s, published by the National Association of Writers in Education. From 2016 to 2023 she was on the Advisory Board of Gitanjali and Beyond. In 2023 she became Editor of its creative writing and art section.

In 2023, it was announced by the late writer Roald Dahl's estate and publishers that his works, such as Charlie and the Chocolate Factory, had been "updated." Words and expressions that were deemed "controversial" and possibly "offensive" to "modern audiences" were removed from the original texts or amended in order to become "more suitable." Many writers, publishers, critics, and media commentators expressed their objection to the texts' changes. Debjani Chatterjee disagreed, stating to the BBC that she found it "a very good thing that publishers are reviewing [Dahl]'s work” and that, in her view, the changes were "done quite sensitively."

== Selected publications ==
=== Poetry collections ===
- I Was that Woman by Hippopotamus, 1989. Also published by Calcutta: Writers Workshop, 1997; and as "Ceste La femme..." by Paris: L'Harmattan, 2000.
- The Sun Rises in the North, with J Lyons, et al. Huddersfield: Smith/Doorstop Books, 1991.
- "A Little Bridge" with Simon Fletcher & Basir Sultan Kazmi. Hebden Bridge: Pennine Pens, 1997.
- Albino Gecko. Salzburg: University of Salzburg, 1998.
- Animal Antics. Hebden Bridge: Pennine Pens, 2000. Illustrated by the author. Foreword by Andrew Motion.
- "Jade Horse Torso: Poems & Translations". Sutton: Sixties Press, 2003.
- Namaskar : New and selected poems. Bradford: Redbeck Press, 2004.
- Words Spit and Splinter. Redbeck Press, 2009.
- "Another Bridge" with Brian D'Arcy, et al. Sheffield: Sahitya Press, 2012.
- Do you Hear the Storm Sing? London: Core Publications, 2014.
- "Laughing with Angels". Sutton: Sixties Press, 2022.

=== Edited poetry ===
- (ed.) The Redbeck Anthology of British South Asian Poetry. Bradford: Redbeck Press, 2000. This won 2nd Prize in the Raymond Williams Community Publishing Competition.
- (ed. with Safuran Ara) Jonmo Amar Jayni Brithai / My Birth was Not in Vain: Selected Poems by Seven Bengali Women. Sheffield: Sheffield Libraries, 2001.
- (ed.) Generations of Ghazals by Nasir Kazmi and Basir Sultan Kazmi. Bradford: Redbeck Press, 2003. Also published in a bilingual Urdu-English edition in Lahore, 2006.
- (ed. with Bashabi Fraser) Rainbow world: Poems from many cultures. London: Hodder Wayland, 2003. Illustrated by Kelly Waldeck. This was an EMMA award runner-up.
- (ed.) Masala : Poems from India, Bangladesh, Pakistan and Sri Lanka. London: Macmillan Children's Books, 2005.
- (ed.) Traditional Turkish Lullabies by Mevlut Ceylan. London: Core Publications, 2010.
- (ed. with Brian D'Arcy) Let's Celebrate! Poems about festivals from around the world. London : Frances Lincoln Children's Books, 2011. Illustrated by Shirin Adl.
- (ed. with Brian D'Arcy) Let's Play! Poems about games and sports from around the world. London : Frances Lincoln Children's Books, 2013. Illustrated by Shirin Adl.
- (ed.) Songs of Choice and their Stories. Sheffield: Sahitya Press, 2014.
- (ed.) British Raj in the Peak District: Threads of Connection. Sheffield: Hindu Samaj Heritage Project, 2015.
- (ed.) Spinning a Yarn: Weaving a Poem. Sheffield: Sahitya Press & University of Nottingham, 2018.

=== Prose ===
- The Role of Religion in "A Passage to India". Calcutta: Writers Workshop, 1984.
- The Elephant-headed God and other Hindu Tales. Cambridge: Lutterworth Press, 1989. [This was selected as Children's Book of the Year 1990.] Also published in the USA by Oxford University Press and in Portuguese translation in Brazil by Madras-Editora.
- The Monkey God and other Hindu Tales. New Delhi, India : Rupa & Co., 1993.
- Nyamia and the Bag of Gold. Harlow: The Longman Book Project, 1994.
- Sally and the Booted Puss and other Stories by Debjani Chatterjee et al. Harlow: The Longman Book Project, 1994.
- The most beautiful child. Cambridge : Cambridge University Press, 1996.
- The Message of Thunder and Other Plays. Chennai: Gul Mohar/Orient Longman, 1999.
- The Song of the Scythe. In 4 bilingual editions (Bengali-English, Urdu-English, Arabic-English & Mandarin Chinese-English. Sheffield: Sheffield Industrial Museums Trust & Sahitya Press, 2005.
- (ed.) Mango Shake. Birmingham: Tindal Street Press, 2006.
- A Tasty Garland. Illustrated by Ali Graney & Others. Sheffield: Sahitya Press with Museums Sheffield, 2010.
- Monkey King's Party. Leamington Spa: Poggle Press, 2013.

=== Bilingual anthologies ===
- (ed. with Rashida Islam) Barbed Lines / Katar Rekha. Sheffield: Sahitya Press (Bengali Women's Support Group); Castleford: Yorkshire Art Circus, 1990. Parallel texts in English and Bengali. Winner of the Raymond Williams Community Publishing Prize.
- (ed. with Rehana Chaudhury et al.) Sweet and Sour / Omlo Modhur. Sheffield: Sahitya Press (Bengali Women's Support Group), 1993. Parallel texts in English and Bengali. Contributed to Bengali Women's Support Group winning a NATECLA award 1993.
- (ed. with Safuran Ara) Home to Home / Ghor Theke Ghore. Sheffield: Sheffield City Libraries, 1995.
- (ed. with Rehana Chaudhury) The Snake Prince & other Folk Tales from Bengal / Nagraj Ebong Banglar Onyanyo Polli Gatha. Sheffield : Sahitya Press (BWSG Book Project), 1999. Parallel texts in Bengali & English.
- (ed. with Arabic translation by Abdul Razak Saleh) Who Cares? Reminiscences of Yemeni Carers in Sheffield. Sheffield: Princess Royal Trust Sheffield Carers Centre, 2001. In Arabic and English.
- (ed. with Ashoka Sen) Daughters of a Riverine Land / Nodir Desher Meye. Sheffield: Sahitya Press (BWSG Book Project), 2003. Parallel texts in English and Bengali.
- (ed. with Rashida Islam) A Slice of Sheffield / Sheffielder ek Phali. Sheffield: Sheffield Galleries & Museums Trust and Sahitya Press, 2005. In Bengali and English.

=== Translations ===
- The Parrot's Training by Rabindranath Tagore, illustrated by Pampa Panwar. London: The Tagore Centre, 1993.
- (trans. with Tara Chatterjee) Album by Uma Prasad Mukherjee. Calcutta: Writers Workshop, 1997.
- Songs in Exile / Probashir Pala by Safuran Ara. Sheffield: Sheffield Libraries, 1999.
- Echoes of the Heart / Hridoyer Protidhwoni by Rashida Islam. Sheffield: Sahitya Press, 2006.
- Existence (Ostittwo) by Sanjay Bhattacharyya. New Delhi: Creative Mind Publications, 2012.
- Deep Dark Sigh (Dhushor dirgho'shaash) by Sanjay Bhattacharyya. Noida: Parragon Publishing, 2017.

== Awards and prizes ==
- 2024 - UKBC Lifetime Achievement Award.
- 2022 - Runner-up for the New Voices Award for fiction
- 2019 - Fellow of the Royal Society of Literature
- 2018 - Runner-up in fiction competition for the Jericho-Marjacq Bursary
- 2016 - Word Masala Excellence in Poetry Award
- 2015 - Word Masala Lifetime Achievement in Poetry
- 2014 onwards - Royal Literary Fund Associate Fellow
- 2012, 2013, 2014 - Royal Literary Fellowship at Leeds Trinity University
- 2012 - Olympic Torchbearer in Sheffield (in the Arts & Culture category)
- 2011 - Paper Tigers chose Let's Celebrate! Festival Poems... as Book of the Month
- 2009 - 1st Prize in Muse India Poetry Translation Competition with poems & songs by Kazi Nazrul Islam
- 2008 - Runner-up in Muse India Short Story Competition
- 2008 - MBE for 'services to Literature' in the Queen's New Year Honours
- 17 March 2008 - Irish Community Recognition & Honour Award from Sheffield Irish Society
- 2007 - Mango Shake selected Book of the Birmingham Festival
- 2006-2009 - Royal Literary Fellowship at York St John University
- 2004 - Rainbow World selected as EMMA (Ethnic & Multicultural Media Award) Finalist
- 2006 - Honorary Life Membership & Certificate from Nasir Kazmi Society, Lahore, for fulfilling the Society's aims & especially for her work in editing and translating Generations of Ghazals: Ghazals by Nasir Kazmi & Basir Sultan Kazmi
- 21 Nov. 2002 - Honorary doctorate from Sheffield Hallam University for 'outstanding contribution to Literature, the Arts & Community Service'
- 2000 - Raymond Williams Runner-up Prize for The Redbeck Anthology of British South Asian Poetry
- 1999 - 'Khitish' shortlisted by Matthew Sweeney as one of the best poems published by Crocus in Manchester
- 1997 - 'Fifty Years Late' selected Poem of the Month by the Poetry Society
- 1995 - Arts Council 'Women in the Arts Travel Award'
- 1995 - Yorkshire & Humberside Arts Writer's Award for poetry
- 1994 - Bengali Women's Support Group won a National Adult Learners' Group Award for their contribution to the Sahitya Press anthology Sweet & Sour / Omlo Modhur
- 1992 - 2nd Prize for 'Visiting E M Forster' in the Southport Writers Circle Open Poetry Competition
- 1992 - 'Invitation to the Party' won Special Mention in the Ripley Poetry Competition
- 1992 - 'Words Between Us' Highly Commended in the Bournemouth International Festival Poetry Competition
- 1992 - 'Koinobori' Commended in the English Explorer Magazine National Poetry Competition
- 1990 - First Prize for Barbed Lines / Katar Rekha in the Raymond Williams Community Publishing Competition
- 1990 - The Elephant-Headed God & Other Hindu Tales selected for Children's Books of the Year
- 1989 - Lancaster Litfest Poetry Prize for 'The Elephant'
- 1989 - Peterloo Poets Prize for 'The Parrot Fortune-Teller' & 'To the English Language'
- 1989 - 'Two-faced' (short story) shortlisted for Artrage Literature Awards
- 1989 - 'Paolozzi's Magic Kingdom' (poem) shortlisted for Artrage Literature Awards
- 1968 - Shankar's International Children's Prize for Poetry

OTHER PRIZES, AWARDS & HONOURS

- June 2010 - Finalist for the Lesley Pearse Woman of Courage Award, Penguin Books
- 17 March 2009 - Irish Festival Certificate for 'outstanding contribution to the Irish community & Irish festivals', from Sheffield Irish Society
- 1976 - Senate Studentship at the University of Lancaster
- 1969, 1971, 1972 - President's Scholarship, American University in Cairo
- 1968, 1970 - Full Tuition Scholarship, American University in Cairo
