= Gallery Whispers =

1999 novel by Quintin Jardine

- First edition cover
- Author: Quintin Jardine
- Language: English
- Genre: Crime novel
- Publisher: Hodder Headline
- Publication date: 1999
- Publication place: Scotland
- Media type: Print (Hardback & Paperback)
- Pages: 407 pp
- ISBN: 0-7472-5667-5
- OCLC: 42874879
- Preceded by: Murmuring the Judges
- Followed by: Thursday Legends

Gallery Whispers is a 1999 detective novel by Quintin Jardine. It is the ninth of the Bob Skinner novels.
