= Edinburgh Review =

Several intellectual and cultural magazines

The Edinburgh Review is the title of five distinct intellectual and cultural magazines. The best known, longest-lasting, and most influential of the four was the third, which was published regularly from 1802 to 1929.

== Edinburgh Review, 1755–1756 ==
The first Edinburgh Review was a short-lived venture initiated in 1755 by the Select Society, a group of Scottish men of letters concerned with the Enlightenment goals of social and intellectual improvement. According to the preface of the inaugural issue, the journal's purpose was to "demonstrate 'the progressive state of learning in this country' and thereby to incite Scots 'to a more eager pursuit of learning, to distinguish themselves, and to do honour to their country.'" As a means to these ends, it would "give a full account of all books published in Scotland within the compass of half a year; and ... take some notice of such books published elsewhere, as are most read in this country, or seem to have any title to draw the public attention." Among the most notable of the foreign publications it observed was Jean-Jacques Rousseau's Discourse on Inequality, which Adam Smith reviewed in the journal's second and final issue, published in March 1756. Its premature folding was due in large part to the partisan attacks the Moderate editors received from their opponents in the Church of Scotland, the Popular Party.

== Edinburgh Magazine and Review, 1773–1776 ==
A short-lived magazine with similar purposes, Edinburgh Magazine and Review, was published monthly between 1773 and 1776.

== Edinburgh Review, 1802–1929 ==
Edinburgh Review
- First issue: 1802
- Final issue: 1929
- Country: Scotland
- Language: English

The third Edinburgh Review became one of the most influential British magazines of the 19th century. It promoted Romanticism and Whig politics. (It was also, however, notoriously critical of some major Romantic poetry.)

Started on 10 October 1802 by Francis Jeffrey, Sydney Smith, Henry Brougham, and Francis Horner, it was published by Archibald Constable in quarterly issues until 1929. It began as a literary and political review. Under its first permanent editor, Francis Jeffrey (the first issue was edited by Sydney Smith), it was a strong supporter of the Whig party and liberal politics, and regularly called for political reform. Its main rival was the Quarterly Review which supported the Tories. The magazine was also noted for its attacks on the Lake Poets, particularly William Wordsworth.

It was owned at one point by John Stewart, whose wife Louisa Hooper Stewart (1818–1918) was an early advocate of women's suffrage, having been educated at the Quaker school of Newington Academy for Girls.

It took its Latin motto judex damnatur cum nocens absolvitur ("the judge is condemned when the guilty is acquitted") from Publilius Syrus.

The magazine ceased publication in 1929.

=== Notable contributors to the third Edinburgh Review ===
- Thomas Arnold
- Richard Harris Barham
- Henry Brougham
- Thomas Brown
- Thomas Carlyle
- Ugo Foscolo
- Henry Hallam
- William Hamilton
- Abraham Hayward
- William Hazlitt
- Felicia Hemans
- Francis Horner
- Leigh Hunt
- Francis Jeffrey
- George Cornewall Lewis
- Thomas Babington Macaulay
- Sir James Mackintosh
- John Ramsay McCulloch
- John Stuart Mill
- Robert Montgomery
- John Playfair
- Henry Reeve
- Henry Enfield Roscoe
- Bertrand Russell
- Charles William Russell
- Sir Walter Scott
- Sismondi
- Sydney Smith
- Herbert Spencer
- Arthur Penrhyn Stanley

== New Edinburgh Review (1969–1984) ==
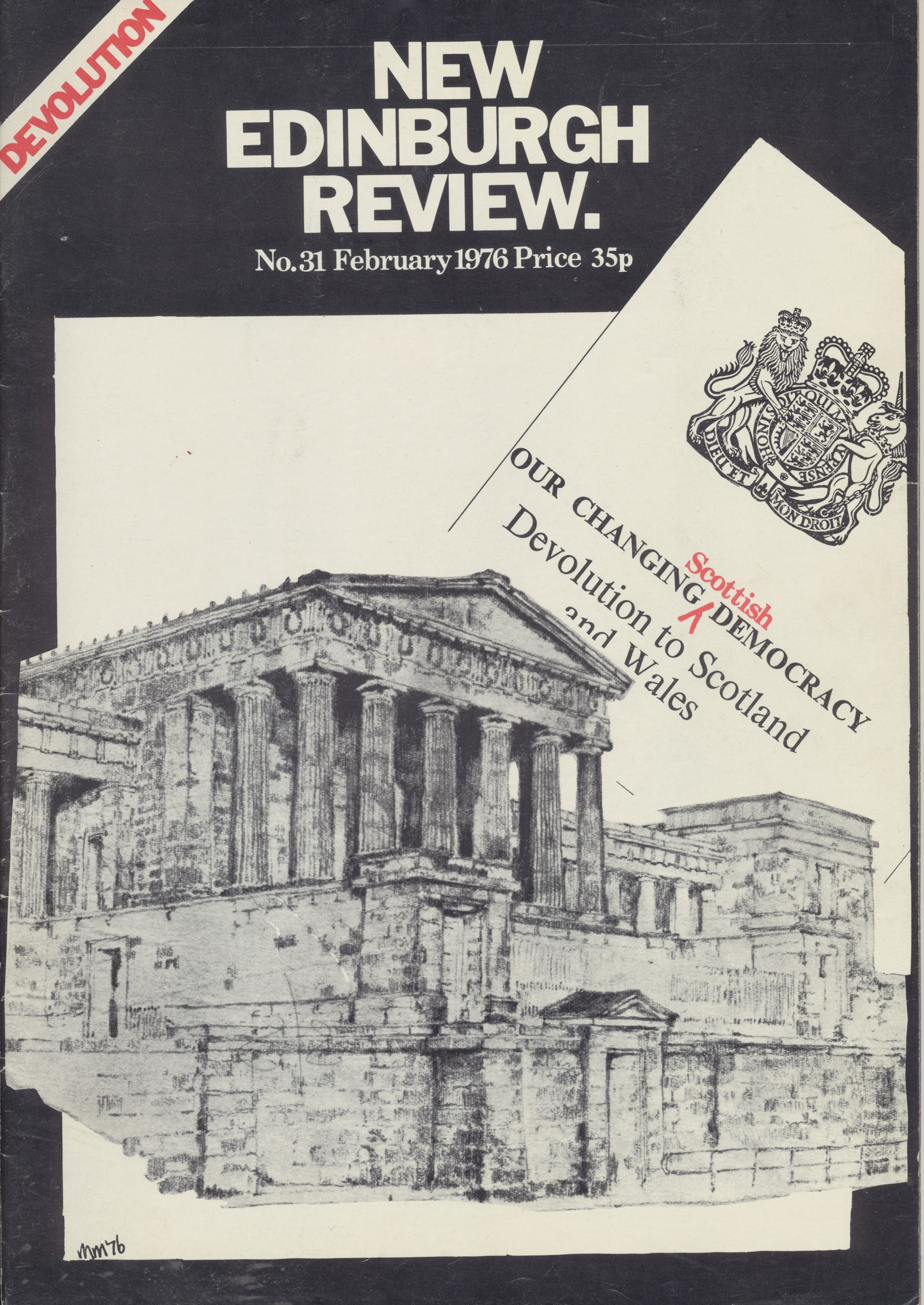
New Edinburgh Review, no. 31 (February 1976)

The Scottish cultural magazine New Edinburgh Review was founded in 1969. It was published by Edinburgh University Student Publications Board (EUSPB). The most famous issues of the New Edinburgh Review were the 1974 issues, supervised by C.K. Maisels, that discussed the philosophy of Antonio Gramsci. James Campbell edited fifteen issues of the magazine between 1978 and 1982. Other editors included David Cubitt, Julian Pollock, Brian Torode, Henry Drucker and Owen Dudley Edwards. Notable contributors included:

- Neal Ascherson
- James Baldwin
- Angus Calder
- Jenni Calder
- Stewart Conn
- Iain Crichton Smith
- William Burroughs
- David Daiches
- Hamish Henderson
- George Mackay Brown
- John P. Mackintosh
- Allan Massie
- Naomi Mitchison
- Edwin Morgan
- Tom Nairn

== Edinburgh Review (1984–2014) ==
In 1984 (from the combined issue 67/68) the magazine adopted the title Edinburgh Review, along with the motto To gather all the rays of culture into one. From 2007 to 2012 it was part of the Eurozine network. Editors of Edinburgh Review included Peter Kravitz, Murdo Macdonald, Robert Alan Jamieson, Gavin Wallace, Sophy Dale and Frank Kuppner. Edinburgh Review was a partner of the Eurozine network from February 2007 to December 2012. Notable contributors included:

- John Burnside
- Ron Butlin
- Alec Finlay
- Janice Galloway
- Alasdair Gray
- Tom Hubbard
- Jackie Kay
- Tom Leonard
- Alastair McIntosh
- Duncan McLean
- Duncan Macmillan
- Janet Paisley
- Alan Spence
- Alan Warner
- Kenneth White
