= Bashabi Fraser =

Indian-Scottish poet, writer, editor, translator and academic (born 1954)

Bashabi Fraser CBE
- Born: 1954 (age 70–71); Purulia, West Bengal, India
- Occupations: Poet, children's writer, editor, translator, academic
- Website: bashabifraser.co.uk

Bashabi Fraser CBE (born 1954) is an Indian-born Scottish academic, editor, translator, and writer. She is a Professor Emerita of English and Creative Writing at Edinburgh Napier University and an Honorary Fellow at the Centre for South Asian Studies at the University of Edinburgh and an Honorary Fellow of the Association of Literary Studies (ALS), Scotland, and a former Royal Literary Fund Fellow. She has authored and edited 23 books, published several articles and chapters, both academic and creative and as a poet.

== Early life and education ==
Born in Purulia, West Bengal, India, Bashabi Fraser moved to the United Kingdom when she was young. Her mother Anima was awarded a scholarship to the London School of Economics and her father Bimalendu Bhattacharya became the first Commonwealth Scholar from India hosted in the UK. A friend of Fraser's parents in the UK, Julian Dakin, would bring books for her and read them with her. Fraser would write poetry for him and he would later enter the poems for the Commonwealth Scholar Award, without her parents' knowledge, which resulted in Fraser winning its first prize.

Fraser returned to India where her parents worked at the newly opened North Bengal University. She attended St. Helen's Convent, Kurseong in Darjeeling and later earned a BA in English from Lady Brabourne College, University of Calcutta and an MA in English from Jadavpur University, both in Kolkata. She pursued a PhD in English from the University of Calcutta and University of Edinburgh, Scotland as a Commonwealth Fellow. She was introduced to her future husband, Neil, while completing her PhD at the University of Edinburgh. She moved to Edinburgh following their wedding.

== Career ==
Fraser was Professor of English and Creative Writing at Edinburgh Napier University and became Professor Emerita at the institution after retirement. She is co-founder and director of the Scottish Centre of Tagore Studies (ScoTs). She is an Honorary Fellow at the Centre for South Asian Studies at the University of Edinburgh and an Honorary Fellow of the Association of Literary Studies (ALS), Scotland, and a former Royal Literary Fund Fellow.

Fraser specialises in postcolonial literature and theory. Her profile on the ScoTs website states that "Her research and writing reflect her interest in diasporic themes: the intermeshings of culture and identity, of dislocation and relocation, of belonging and otherness, of memory and nostalgia, of third space and hybridity and of conflicts and freedoms." She is chief editor of Gitanjali and Beyond, an academic and creative peer-reviewed online journal associated with ScoTs, and is on the editorial board of WritersMosaic, a platform for writers of colour which is an initiative of the Royal Literary Fund.

Fraser has been described as "chief ideator" of the Intercultural Poetry and Performance Library, an organisation made up of various creative individuals and formed in 2017 under the Kolkata Indian Council for Cultural Relations.

== Honors and awards ==
Fraser was appointed a Commander of the Order of the British Empire in the 2021 New Year Honours for services to education, culture and cultural integration in Scotland, in particular her projects linking Scotland and India. The Saltire Society named her an Outstanding Woman of Scotland in 2015.

== Works ==
=== As author ===
- — (1997). Life. London: Diehard. ISBN 9780946230440.
- — (2001). With Best Wishes from Edinburgh. Calcutta: Writers Workshop. ISBN 9788175958517.
- — (2004). Just One Diwali Night: A Children's Story. Kolkata: Das Gupta & Co. ISBN 9788182110045.
- — (2004). Tartan & Turban. Edinburgh: Luath. ISBN 9781842820445.
- — (2004). Topsy Turvy. Kolkata: Das Gupta & Co. ISBN 9788182110052.
- — (2009). From the Ganga to the Tay: a poetic conversation between the Ganges and the Tay. Edinburgh: Luath. ISBN 9781906307950.
- — (2011). Scots Beneath the Banyan Tree: Stories from Bengal. Edinburgh: Owl and Lion. ISBN 9780956808103.
- — (2012). Ragas and Reels: Visual and Poetic Stories of Migration and Diaspora. Edinburgh: Luath. ISBN 9781908373342.
- — (2015). Letters to My Mother and Other Mothers. Edinburgh. ISBN 9781910745144.
- — (2017). The Homing Bird. Halwill, Beaworthy: Indigo Scotland. ISBN 9781910834343.
- — (2019). My Mum's Sari. Word Waves. Bright Button Productions.
- — (2019). The Ramayana: A Stage Play and A Screen Play. Jaipur, India: Aadi Publications. ISBN 978-93-87799-28-8.
- — (2019). Rabindranath Tagore. Critical Lives. London: Reaktion Books. ISBN 9781789141498.
- — (2021). Patient Dignity. Edinburgh: Scotland Street Press. ISBN 9781910895542.

=== As editor ===
- —; Clark, Helen; Dick, Lorraine, eds. (1996). Peoples of Edinburgh: Our Multicultural City, personal narratives, experiences, and photographs. City of Edinburgh Council.
- —; Clark, Helen; Connan, Joyce, eds. (1999). Peoples of Edinburgh: Methodology and Evaluation. City of Edinburgh Council and Workers Educational Association.
- —; Grieg, Elaine, eds. (2000). Edinburgh: an Intimate City, an illustrated anthology of contemporary poetry on Edinburgh. Dept. of Recreation, City of Edinburgh Council. ISBN 978-0905072937.
- —; Chatterjee, Debjani, eds. (2003). Rainbow World: Poems from Many Cultures. London: Hodder Wayland. ISBN 978-0750242806.
- —, ed. (2004). The Tagore-Geddes Correspondence. Kolkata: Visva-Bharati. ISBN 9788175223738.
- —, ed. (2006). Bengal Partition Stories: An Unclosed Chapter. London: Anthem Press. ISBN 978-1843312994.
- —; Mukherjee, Tapati; Sen, Amrit, eds. (2017). Scottish Orientalism and the Bengal Renaissance: The Continuum of Ideas. Santiniketan: Visva-Bharati. ISBN 9788175226517.
- —; Mukherjee, Tapati; Sen, Amrit, eds. (2017). A Confluence of Minds: The Rabindranath Tagore and Patrick Geddes Reader on Education and Environment.
- —; Riach, Alan, eds. (2017). Thali Katori, An Anthology of Scottish and South Asian Poetry. Edinburgh. ISBN 978-1912147090.
