= George Friel =

Scottish writer

George Friel (15 July 1910 – 1975) was a Scottish writer. He was born in Glasgow as the fourth of seven children, and was educated at St. Mungo's Academy and the University of Glasgow. After a period of service in the army, he returned to the family home in Bishopbriggs and worked as a teacher until his death from cancer in 1975.

1st edition of Grace and Miss Partridge

The Boy Who Wanted Peace, Mr Alfred M.A. and Grace and Miss Partridge were published in 1999 as The Glasgow Trilogy by Canongate Books. A collection of short stories was published in 1992 by Polygon under the title A friend of humanity and other stories.

Friel's fourth novel, Mr Alfred M.A., made it to the "100 Best Scottish Books of all Time" list.

== Books ==
- The Bank of Time (London: New Authors, 1959)
- The Boy Who Wanted Peace (London: John Calder, 1964)
- Grace and Miss Partridge (London: Calder and Boyars, 1969)
- Mr Alfred M.A. (London: Calder and Boyars, 1972)
- An Empty House (London: Calder and Boyars, 1974)
