= Jessie Kesson =

Scottish playwright, radio producer

- Born: Jessie Grant McDonald; 28 October 1916; Inverness, Scotland
- Died: 26 September 1994 (aged 77)
- Occupations: Playwright, radio producer

Jessie Kesson (28 October 1916 – 26 September 1994), born Jessie Grant McDonald, was a Scottish novelist, playwright and radio producer.

== Life ==
She was born in a workhouse in Inverness, to a mother who had turned to prostitution after being disowned by her family, and brought up in Elgin until the age of eight. She was then taken from her mother and placed in an orphanage at Skene, Aberdeenshire. In her circumstances, she was not permitted to enter further education and had to go into domestic service.

While in domestic service she suffered a breakdown and was admitted to the Royal Cornhill Hospital in Aberdeen for a year. After leaving the hospital she spent time living with an elderly woman on a croft in Abriachan. It was there in 1934, while roaming the hills, that she met and subsequently married Johnnie Kesson, a cattleman. She and her husband were farm workers in North East Scotland from 1939 to 1951; writing from this period illustrates her abiding love of nature and immersion in the changing seasons.

Encounters with Nan Shepherd and then Neil M. Gunn opened opportunities in writing, including plays for the BBC in Aberdeen.

She moved to London in 1947, where she lived for the rest of her life. As well as domestic work, she worked as a radio producer, producing Woman's Hour and more than 100 radio plays.

In 1984 and in 1988 she was awarded honorary doctorates from the University of Dundee and the University of Aberdeen and in 2009 Scotland's Creative Writing Centre, Moniack Mhor, established the Jessie Keeson Fellowship in honour of her life and work.

== Works ==
Her writings include The White Bird Passes (1958), filmed for BBC Television in 1980 and adapted by Anne Downie for a 1988 Tron Theatre stage production, Glitter of Mica (1963), Another Time, Another Place (1983), which became an award-winning film, and Where the Apple Ripens (1985).

As well as writing novels, she also wrote more than 100 plays for radio over 45 years.

In 2000, the first edition of Isobel Murray's authorised biography Jessie Kesson: Writing Her Life, published by Canongate Books, won the National Library of Scotland/Saltire Research Book of the Year. The second edition, published by Kennedy & Boyd in 2011, revealed the truth about Kesson's ever-absent father.

== Reviews ==
- Donaldson, William (1980), review of The White Bird Passes, in Cencrastus No. 4, Winter 1980–81, pp. 47 & 48, ISSN 0264-0856
- Anderson, Carol (1983), Shining Corn: Glittering Mica, which includes a review of Glittering Mica, in Hearn, Sheila G. (ed.), Cencrastus No. 12, Spring 1983, pp. 40 & 41, ISSN 0264-0856
