= Peter Kravitz =

Peter Kravitz (born 1961) is a figure in the Scottish literary scene, and is best-known for editing the Edinburgh Review. He was born in London, England, but has lived most of his life in Edinburgh. He is Jewish. He edited the Edinburgh Review between 1984 and 1990, and was editorial director of Polygon Books between 1986 and 1990.

While at Polygon, he tried to publish James Kelman's second novel A Chancer, and requested a grant from the Scottish Arts Council. They refused because Alick Buchanan-Smith, a Conservative MP, had complained about the "foul language" in Kelman's first novel.

In the late 1990s he worked for Napier University.

== Publications ==
In 1997 he published The Book of Contemporary Scottish Fiction

In 1999 he published The Vintage Book of Contemporary Scottish Fiction
