= Frederic Lindsay =

Scottish writer

Frederic Lindsay (12 August 1933 – 31 May 2013) was a Scottish crime writer, who was born in Glasgow and lived in Edinburgh. He was a full-time writer from 1979 and previously worked as a lecturer, teacher and library assistant. He was active in a number of literary organisations including the Society of Authors, International PEN (a worldwide writers' association promoting freedom of expression) and the Scottish Arts Council. In addition to novels he also wrote for TV, radio and the theatre. Two of his novels have been made into films.

== DI Jim Meldrum series ==
Meldrum was one of those men defined by their job. Assuming he had a private life at all, it was hard to imagine what it might be. A glance to the side gave... a glimpse of the raw-boned profile, big nose, long chin, thin mouth, giving nothing away. The hands surrounding the steering wheel were thick-fingered, old scars white on the back of the nearer, hands shaped by grasping tools, a workman’s hands.

— The Endings Man, 2005

Lindsay wrote eight novels over the course of eleven years featuring Detective Inspector Jim Meldrum, an officer with Lothian and Borders Police, as their main protagonist. He was originally intended as a one-off study into the fate of a whistleblower and the personal cost of integrity. But Lindsay's publishers at the time, Hodder and Stoughton, commissioned further works and so the series was born.

The Meldrum books are classic police procedurals, dark in tone, which sometimes exploit the convention of having the identity of the perpetrator known to the reader before it becomes clear to the detectives. They feature considerable insights into the character and mental processes of the protagonist and into the effect that his work as a detective has on his personal life; this is another key feature of this genre. They also project a strong sense of place through the use of locations in Edinburgh and around Scotland and through the inclusion of distinctively Scottish speech and cultural references. These are all characteristics that make the Meldrum novels comparable to the highly regarded Italian-based Aurelio Zen series by fellow crime writer Michael Dibdin.

In a 2002 article for the Association for Scottish Literary Studies Lindsay described his work on the Meldrum books as a challenge in developing a complex, rounded and psychologically interesting character within the form and conventions of the detective genre.

== Other works ==
Lindsay described his novels as "differ[ing] markedly in tone and subject matter." They have themes including coming of age and sexual discovery (My Life as a Man), the death of a sibling (Jill Rips) and psychosis (After the Stranger Came).

In 2005, his 1983 novel Brond was nominated in a List Magazine/Scottish Book Trust list of the 100 best Scottish books of all time.

== Involvement in television and films ==
In 1987, Brond was made into a three-part television series for Channel 4 directed by fellow Scotsman Michael Caton-Jones and featuring the actors Stratford Johns, John Hannah and James Cosmo.

One of Lindsay's works has been made into a film: in 1999 Jill Rips was made into an independent Hollywood film (also known in the United States as Jill the Ripper for its video release and Tied Up for its TV debut) directed by Anthony Hickox and starring Dolph Lundgren.

== Bibliography ==
=== Novels featuring DI Jim Meldrum ===
- The Stranger from Home (2008)
- Tremor of Demons (2007)
- The Endings Man (2005)
- Darkness in My Hand (2001)
- Death Knock (2000)
- Idle Hands (1999)
- A Kind of Dying (1998)
- Kissing Judas (1997)

=== Other works by Frederic Lindsay ===
- My Life as a Man (2006)
- After the Stranger Came (1992)
- A Charm Against Drowning (1988)
- Jill Rips (1987), adapted as the 1999 film of the same name
- Brond (1983)
- And Be the Nations Again (Poems) (1975)
