= Frank Kuppner =

Scottish writer

- Born: 1951 (age 74–75); Glasgow, Scotland
- Education: University of Glasgow; Strathclyde University
- Occupations: Poet; Novelist
- Writing career
- Genres: Poetry; Fiction; Non-fiction

Frank Kuppner (born 1951 in Glasgow) is a Scottish poet and novelist.

== Life ==
He has edited the Edinburgh Review and been Writer in Residence at various institutions, currently at University of Glasgow, and Strathclyde University.

== Awards ==
- 2008 Creative Scotland Award
- 1995 McVitie’s Writer of the Year Award, for Something Very Like Murder
- 1984 Scottish Arts Council Book Award, for A Bad Day for the Sung Dynasty
- 1972 AKROS Hugh Macdiarmid 80th Birthday Poetry Competition

== Works ==
=== Poetry ===
- A Bad Day for the Sung Dynasty. Carcanet. 1984. ISBN 978-0-85635-514-1.
- The Intelligent Observation of Naked Women. Carcanet. 1987. ISBN 978-0-85635-565-3.
- Ridiculous! Absurd! Disgusting!. Carcanet. 1989. ISBN 978-0-85635-799-2.
- Everything is Strange. Carcanet. 1994. ISBN 978-1-85754-071-0.
- Second Best Moments in Chinese History. Carcanet. 1997. ISBN 978-1-85754-310-0.
- What? Again? Selected Poems. Carcanet. 2000. ISBN 978-1-85754-499-2.
- A God's Breakfast. Carcanet. 2004. ISBN 978-1-85754-744-3.
- Arioflotga. Carcanet Press Ltd. 2008. ISBN 978-1-85754-933-1.
- The Same Life Twice. Carcanet Press Ltd. 2012. ISBN 978-1847771452.

=== Non-Fiction ===
- A Concussed History of Scotland. Polygon. 1990. ISBN 978-0-7486-6059-9.

=== Fiction ===
- Life on a Dead Planet. Polygon. 1996. ISBN 978-0-7486-6151-0.
- Something Very Like Murder. Polygon. 1994. ISBN 978-0-7486-6181-7.
- In the Beginning There Was Physics. Polygon. 1999. ISBN 978-0-7486-6248-7.
- A very quiet street. Polygon. 1989. ISBN 978-0-7486-6004-9.

== Reviews ==
A God's Breakfast is three books in one. The first and longest is "The Uninvited Guest", a sequence of hundreds of cod-classical epigrams and fragments; the third, "What Else is There?" a collection of 120 shorter poems. The rest of the volume is given up to "West Åland, or Five Tombeaux for Mr Testoil". At 48 pages, "West Åland" is about as long as The Waste Land and Four Quartets combined and is, I'd reckon, the most protracted dance ever made by one poet upon the grave of another.
