= George Douglas Brown =

Scottish novelist (1869–1902)

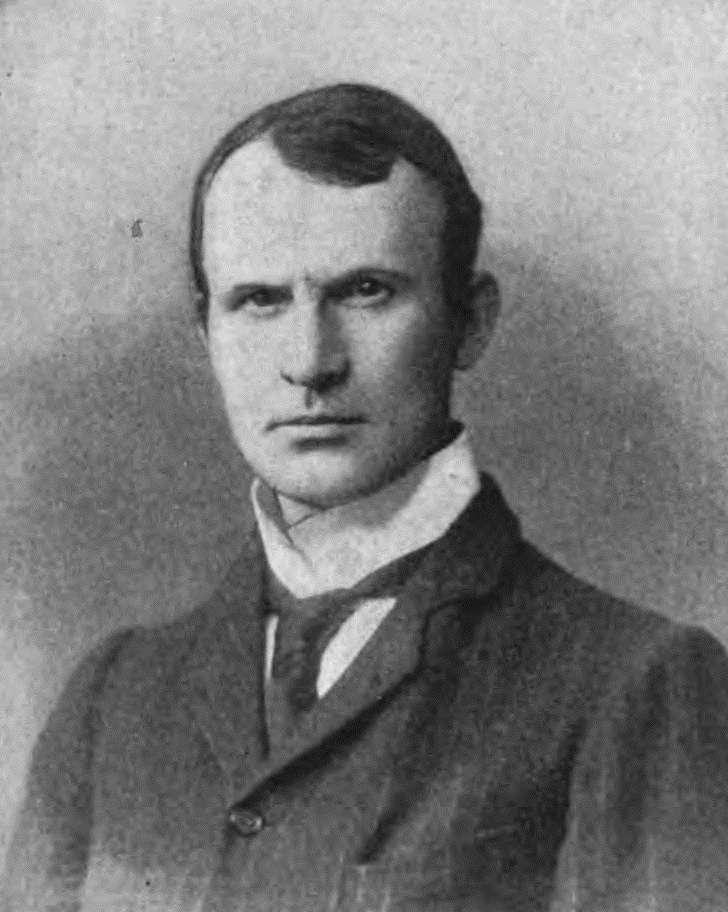
- Born: 26 January 1869; Ochiltree, Ayrshire
- Died: 28 August 1902 (aged 33); London
- Occupations: journalist, teacher, novelist, short story writer, critic
- Writing career
- Pen name: George Douglas; Kennedy King
- Period: 1896-1901
- Genre: Realism
- Notable work: The House with the Green Shutters (1901)
- Literary movement: Scottish Renaissance

George Douglas Brown (26 January 1869 – 28 August 1902) was a Scottish novelist, best known for his highly influential realist novel The House with the Green Shutters (1901), which was published the year before his death at the age of 33.

== Life and work ==
Brown was the illegitimate son of a farmer and a woman of Irish descent. He went to school at Ochiltree, Coylton, and Ayr, his academic performance allowing him to study Classics at the University of Glasgow and at Balliol College, Oxford. However his studies were interrupted by the illness of his mother; he returned to Ayrshire to nurse her, but she died, and in 1895 he barely passed his final examinations. He travelled to London and worked as a journalist, contributing articles and stories to Blackwood's Magazine, as well as a part-time editor and reader for publishing houses. At one point he was a staff writer for Sandow's Magazine of Physical Culture. In 1899 he published Love and a Sword under the pseudonym Kennedy King, the same pseudonym he used for his articles. The next year he started work at Haslemere on The House with the Green Shutters, which was published in 1901 under the pseudonym George Douglas. The book was a success, and he planned a second novel to be called The Incompatibles, but shortly afterwards he contracted pneumonia and died at the home of his friend and publisher Andrew Melrose.

The novel gives a strongly outlined picture of the harder and less genial aspects of Scottish life and character, and was regarded as a useful corrective to the more roseate presentations of the kailyard school of J. M. Barrie and Ian Maclaren. Reprinted frequently throughout the twentieth century, it was most recently re-issued by Birlinn of Edinburgh. An annual event in Brown's memory, The Green Shutters Festival of Working Class Writing, is held in Ochiltree, the town believed to be the model for the village of Barbie.

In December 2004, the house in which he was born was gutted by fire.

As of August 2007, the house in which he was born in Ochiltree has been re-opened as "The Green Shutters Pub". A memorial plaque is allocated on the outside wall.

The house is now used as a pharmacy.
