= Our Fathers (novel) =

1999 novel by Andrew O'Hagan

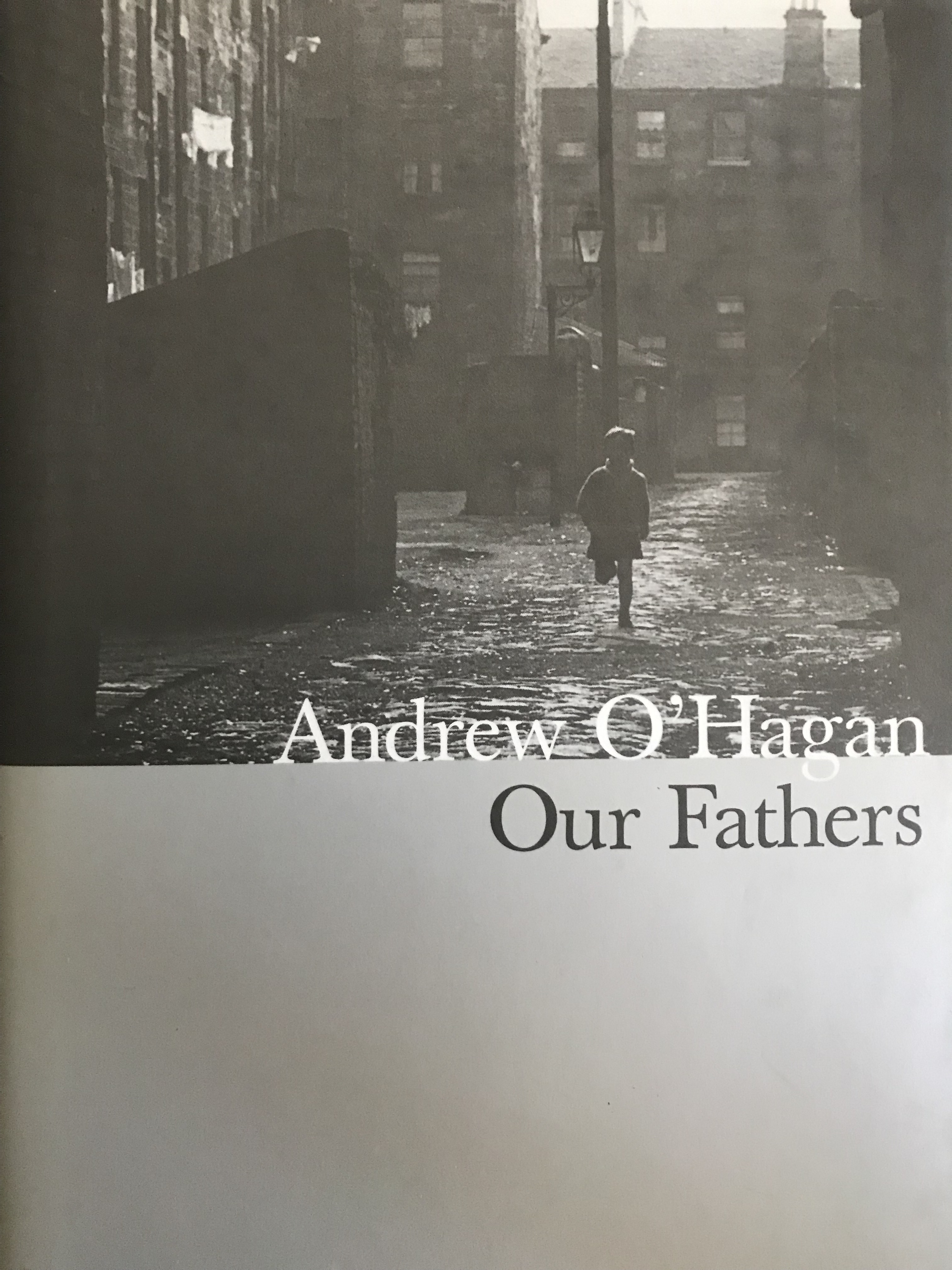
- Our Fathers Andrew O'Hagan
- Author: Andrew O'Hagan
- Language: English
- Genre: Literary Fiction
- Publisher: www.faber.co.uk
- Publication date: 1999
- Media type: Print (hardcover)
- Awards: Los Angeles Times' Prize for Fiction and Booker Prize nominee.

Our Fathers (1999) is the debut novel by Scottish novelist Andrew O'Hagan. It was shortlisted for the Booker Prize (1999). It was also nominated for the Whitbread First Novel Award and the International Dublin Literary Award.

The book focuses on James Bawn revisiting his dying grandfather Hugh Bawn in Ayrshire and a brief reunion with his alcoholic father Robert Bawn. It is James who tells the story of his family, heirs of immigrants from Ireland. Hugh, known as "Mr Housing", had been responsible for the building of tower blocks in Glasgow and across south-west Scotland to replace earlier slums, but these blocks are now in turn being demolished. All three generations of the family followed lives of pride and depression, of nationality and alcohol, of Catholic faith and the end of left-wing idealism.

== Plot ==
Hugh Bawn was a Modernist hero. A dreamer, a Socialist, a man of the people, he led Scotland's building programme after the war. Now he lies on a bed on the eighteenth floor. The times have changed. His flats are coming down. The idealism he learned from his mother is gone. And even as his breath goes out he clings to the old ways. His final months are plagued by memory and loss, by a bitter sense of his family and his country, who could not live up to the houses he built for them.

Hugh's grandson, Jamie, comes home to watch over his dying mentor. The old man's final months bring Jamie to see what is best and worst in the past the haunts them all, and he sees the fears of his own life unravel in the land that bred him. He tells the story of his own family - a tale of pride and delusion, of nationality and strong drink, of Catholic faith and the end of the old Left. It is a tale of dark hearts and modern houses, of three men in search for Utopia.
