= The House with the Green Shutters =

1901 novel by George Douglas Brown

- Modern Library edition from 1927 of The House with the Green Shutters
- Author: George Douglas Brown
- Language: English
- Genre: Realism
- Publisher: John MacQueen, London
- Publication date: 1901
- Publication place: Scotland
- Media type: Hardback, Paperback

The House with the Green Shutters is a novel by the Scottish writer George Douglas Brown, first published in 1901 by John MacQueen. Set in mid-19th century Ayrshire, in the fictitious town of Barbie which is based on his native Ochiltree, it consciously violates the conventions of the sentimental kailyard school, and is sometimes quoted as an influence on the Scottish Renaissance.

The novel describes the struggles of a proud and taciturn carrier, John Gourlay, against the spiteful comments and petty machinations of the envious and idle villagers of Barbie (the "bodies"). The sudden return after fifteen years' absence of the ambitious merchant James Wilson, son of a mole-catcher, leads to commercial competition against which Gourlay has trouble responding.

After the arrival of the railway, Gourlay's position worsens and he begins to invest his hopes and money in his neurotic son, John, who cannot live up to his expectations. His scatterbrained wife and daughter live in terror of his ferocious temper and take refuge in novelettes and daydreaming.

The symbol of the family's prosperity is their expensive house in the middle of the town:

Both in appearance and position the house was a worthy counterpart of its owner. It was a substantial two-storey dwelling, planted firm and gawcey on a little natural terrace that projected a considerable distance into the Square. At the foot of the steep little bank shelving to the terrace ran a stone wall, of no great height, and the iron railings it uplifted were no higher than the sward within. Thus the whole house was bare to the view from the ground up, nothing in front to screen its admirable qualities. From each corner, behind, flanking walls went out to the right and left, and hid the yard and the granaries. In front of these walls the dwelling seemed to thrust itself out for notice.

— from Chapter III

== Criticism ==
A great deal of the success that the novel enjoyed was the result of its sheer novelty. It was said to be the first "truthful" picture of Scottish life since the death of John Galt, and a welcome antidote to the so-called kailyard school of writing which described rural Scotland sentimentally as a group of peaceful and harmonious communities helping one another through difficult times. The novel is filled with interesting people, described without much sympathy, and is well-stocked with the author's musings on life and the Scottish character. Most adverse criticism focuses on the book's tendencies towards melodrama.

The positive reaction greatly encouraged Brown who planned another novel called The Incompatibles and a book on his "rules of writing"; however both were never to be finished, due to the author's death.

It was an inspiration to Lewis Grassic Gibbon, Hugh MacDiarmid, and many other writers of the next generation. Jorge Luis Borges said in an interview that it was the first English-language novel he ever read, and that after reading it he "wanted to be Scotch." Its wisdom and scepticism retain interest for modern readers.

== Plot summary ==
=== Prosperity ===
- Chapter I. On a weekday morning at eight, Gourlay's twelve carts set off together, and are watched by all in the Square.
- Chapter II. Describes how Gourlay dominates the carrying business in the town, and how his rights to the local quarry (due to expire in two years) were granted to him by the Laird of Templandmuir. Introduces Toddle, the Deacon, the Provost, and Coe.
- Chapter III. Introduces his 12-year-old son, John Gourlay, and describes the House with the Green Shutters.
- Chapter IV. Introduces Mrs Gourlay and her daughter Janet. The orra man, Jock Gilmour, hits John, then quarrels with his mother and father. He is dismissed.
- Chapter V. Gilmour boasts to the "bodies" about the quarrel. They talk about how Gourlay was cheated by his builder Gibson. Later, when Gourlay passes, the bodies, led by the Deacon, ask him for access to his property in order to tap a spring, which would provide running water for the town. He refuses.
- Chapter VI. After John passes on his way to school, the bodies start discussing him. Johnny Coe tells the story of the boy's birth, when Jock Gourlay's stubbornness endangered his life.
- Chapter VII. At noon, John is hurt by Swipey Broon, and he runs away from school.
- Chapter VIII. John runs home and hides in the attic. After Janet comes home from school, he goes downstairs to find his father showing off his new fender to Grant of Loranogie.

=== The interloper ===
- Chapter IX. James Wilson returns to Barbie after fifteen years' absence, during which he has become a successful businessman. He accosts Gourlay, who slights him.
- Chapter X. James Wilson moves into town. He converts Rab Jamieson's barn into an Emporium.
- Chapter XI. Wilson's business encroaches on Gourlay's. When Wilson spoils his bargaining, Gourlay is so angry that he accidentally breaks his own walking-stick.
- Chapter XII. Templandmuir, on Wilson's request, asks Gourlay to attend a public meeting about the new railway. At the meeting, Gourlay is humiliated; after he storms out, Templandmuir takes the opportunity to tell him his lease of the quarry will not be renewed. Gourlay, furious, returns home and hits his wife.
- Chapter XIII. Four years have passed since Wilson's arrival. Johnny Gibson helps Wilson lay a plan to keep Gourlay's carts busy, so that he will later miss a better opportunity which Wilson can make use of. This is done by having him sign a contract eight weeks in advance. Once Gourlay realises he has been tricked, he refuses to honour the contract. When Gibson remonstrates with him, Gourlay throws him through the window of the Red Lion Inn.
- Chapter XIV. In order to keep up with the Wilsons, Gourlay has sent his son to the High School of Skeighan. John often plays truant; one day, when his father catches him, he drags him to the school and throws him at the headmaster.
- Chapter XV. Gourlay's pony "Tam" dies. Forced to use the bus, he overhears that Wilson's son is to go to Edinburgh to study, and Gourlay resolves to send John there too.

=== John's career ===
- Chapter XVI. John takes the train to Edinburgh. A description of his impressionable character.
- Chapter XVII. John and young Jimmy Wilson are invited to dinner by Jock Allan, where they meet Tarmillan, Logan, Tozer and old Partan. The conversation turns to Bauldy Johnston, an acquaintance, and his skill at phrase-making.
- Chapter XVIII. In his second year at Edinburgh, John wins the Raeburn Prize for his essay on "An Arctic Night."
- Chapter XIX. John returns home at night, very proud. He notices that his mother is perhaps not well.
- Chapter XX. He struts around Barbie, smoking cigarettes. During his summer holidays, he acquires a habit of drinking to excess.
- Chapter XXI. John is scandalously drunk.
- Chapter XXII. John leaves for Edinburgh, slighting the Deacon as he goes. Gourlay is forced to dismiss his last worker, Peter Riney.
- Chapter XXIII. John is expelled from the university. What with the serious illnesses of Janet and Mrs Gourlay, the family is on the brink of financial ruin.

=== The end ===
- Chapter XXIV. Gourlay receives a letter informing him of his son's disgrace. On his way to borrow £80 from Johnny Coe, the "bodies" of Barbie watch him and make veiled insults.
- Chapter XXV. Gourlay confronts his son and there is a ferocious brawl. John takes momentary refuge at the Red Lion, but gets into a fight with Brodie. On his return, they grapple again, and John hits his father with the huge poker, killing him instantly.
- Chapter XXVI. They send for the doctor, claiming that Gourlay fell from the ladder. John starts to go insane. Mrs Gourlay discovers that their mortgage is to be foreclosed. John is sent to Glasgow to see if anything can be done.
- Chapter XXVII. John returns, without success. He poisons himself. After discovering his body, both Janet (who has tuberculosis) and Mrs Gourlay (who has breast cancer) poison themselves. Their corpses are discovered the next morning.

== List of characters ==
- John Gourlay, the carrier of Barbie
- John Gourlay, his son
- Janet Gourlay, his daughter
- Mrs Gourlay (Miss Richmond of Tenshillingland)
- Peter Riney, his old assistant
- James Wilson and his wife, owners of the Emporium
- Old Tarmillan of Irrendavie (ch.11)
- The Laird of Templandmuir, who granted him rights to the quarry (ch.2, 12)
- Johnny Gibson, who built the house (ch.5, 13)
- Grant of Loranogie, a wealthy farmer (ch.8)
- Jock Allan, a middle-aged actuary at Edinburgh (ch.17)

=== Nesty bodies ===
- Sandy Toddle and his sister
- Deacon Allardyce
- Provost Connal

(named in ch.12; in ch.14 he is "ex-Provost"; by ch.24, Wilson is Provost)

- Tam Brodie, a cobbler (ch.5, 25)

=== Harmless bodies ===
- Johnny Coe, a gossip
- Tam Wylie, a wealthy farmer (ch.5)
- The baker, a Burnsomaniac (ch.5, 14)
- The Reverend Mr Struthers (ch.5, 20)

=== Minor characters ===
- Jock Gilmour, Gourlay's orra man (sacked in ch.4)
- Andy Gow and Elshie Hogg, carters in Gourlay's employ (ch.1)
- Jimmy Bain and Sandy Cross, two other employees (ch.24)
- Drucken Wallace and his wife
- Cunningham the dirty and Calderwood the drunken, grocers (ch.11)
- Widow Wallace (ch.5)
- MacCandlish, headmaster of Skeighan High School (ch.14)
- The dominie (headmaster) of the primary school (ch.15)
- Auld Tam, or "Aquinas", a professor at Edinburgh (ch.18)

== Dramatisation ==
An adaptation of the novel for the stage by Gerard Mulgrew was produced by Communicado at the Lyceum Studio Theatre on the Edinburgh Festival Fringe in August 1989, with Sandy Welch in the role of John Gourlay.
