= Quintin Jardine =

Scottish writer (born 1945)

- Jardine in 2006
- Born: Matthew Quintin Jardine; 1945 (age 80–81); Motherwell, Lanarkshire, Scotland
- Occupation: Novelist
- Writing career
- Period: 1993–present
- Genre: Crime fiction

Matthew Quintin Jardine (born 1945) is a Scottish author. He is best known for his crime novels featuring the fictional characters Bob Skinner, Oz Blackstone, and Primavera Blackstone.

== Early life and career ==
Jardine was born in Motherwell, Lanarkshire, and educated at the High School of Glasgow and Glasgow University, where he studied law but did not graduate. Returning home, he began working life as a trainee journalist for the Motherwell Times in 1964, before joining the Government Information Service at the Scottish Office seven years later. He later moved to the Office's Publicity Unit, organising media coverage of Royal visits. In 1980, Jardine became a press officer for the Scottish Conservative Party, but left that role after six years to set up his own media consultancy. He settled upon being a writer in 1993 after publishing his first novel, Skinner's Rules.

== Politics ==
Having been a member of the Conservatives for many years, his support for a 'maximalist' position on Scottish devolution estranged him from the majority of the party, especially after he wrote a paper (together with Michael Fry, Brian Meek and Struan Stevenson) calling for the establishment of a 114-seat Scottish Parliament with tax-raising powers. At around the time of the 1997 general election he abandoned them for the Scottish National Party (SNP), standing unsuccessfully in his new colours for Aberlady, Gullane and Dirleton ward at the 1999 East Lothian Council election. He later left the SNP, finding it "too left wing for [his] taste."

== Personal life ==
Jardine supports his hometown football club, Motherwell F.C. He divides his time between Gullane, East Lothian and Spain.

== Bibliography ==
=== Bob Skinner series ===
Jardine has written 35 novels featuring senior Edinburgh policeman Bob Skinner:

1. Skinner's Rules (1993)
2. Skinner's Festival (1994)
3. Skinner's Trail (1994)
4. Skinner's Round (1995)
5. Skinner's Ordeal (1996)
6. Skinner's Mission (1997)
7. Skinner's Ghosts (1998)
8. Murmuring the Judges (1998)
9. Gallery Whispers (1999)
10. Thursday Legends (2000)
11. Autographs in the Rain (2001)
12. Head Shot (2002)
13. Fallen Gods (2003)
14. Stay of Execution (2004)
15. Lethal Intent (2005)
16. Dead and Buried (2006)
17. Death's Door (2007)
18. Aftershock (2008)
19. Fatal Last Words (2009)
20. A Rush of Blood (2010)
21. Grievous Angel (2011)
22. Funeral Note (2012)
23. Pray for the Dying (2013)
24. Hour of Darkness (2014)
25. Last Resort (2015)
26. Private Investigations (2016)
27. Game Over (2017)
28. State Secrets (2017)
29. A Brush With Death (2018)
30. Cold Case (2018)
31. The Bad Fire (2019)
32. The Roots of Evil (2020)
33. Deadlock (2021)
34. Open Season (2022)
35. The Cage (2023)
36. Secrets and Lies (2024)
37. Dead Man's Tale (2025)

=== Oz Blackstone series ===
Novels featuring Oz Blackstone, a private investigator in London:

1. Blackstone's Pursuits (1996)
2. A Coffin for Two (1997)
3. Wearing Purple (1999)
4. Screen Savers (2000)
5. On Honeymoon with Death (2001)
6. Poisoned Cherries (2002)
7. Unnatural Justice (2003)
8. Alarm Call (2004)
9. For the Death of Me (2005)

=== Primavera Blackstone series ===
Novels featuring Primavera Blackstone, Oz Blackstone's ex-wife:

1. Inhuman Remains (2009)
2. Blood Red (2010)
3. As Easy As Murder (2012)
4. Deadly Business (2013)
5. As Serious as Death (2013)

=== Other projects ===
- The Loner (2011): A standalone story about Xavier "Xavi" Aislado's life
- Mathew's Tale (2014): A story concerning Mathew Fleming, a 19th-century ancestor of Bob Skinner, set in 1818 in Carluke, Lanarkshire.
- Skinner's Elves: A Bob Skinner Christmas Story (2017). A short story set in 2041. Included in the audiobook for The Cage.
