= Alan Spence =

British writer

Alan Spence (born 1947) is a Scottish writer and is Professor in Creative Writing at the University of Aberdeen, where he is also artistic director of the annual WORD Festival. He was born in Glasgow, educated at Allan Glen's School there, and much of his work is set in the city.

Spence is a poet and playwright, novelist and short-story writer, and has recently been commissioned by Scottish Opera to set words to a piece of music by Miriama Young.

His first work was the collection of short stories Its colours they are fine, first published in 1977. This was followed by two plays, Sailmaker in 1982 and Space Invaders in 1983. The novel The Magic Flute appeared in 1990 along with his first book of poetry Glasgow Zen. In 1991, another of his plays, Changed Days, was published before a brief hiatus.

He returned in 1996 with Stone Garden, another collection of short stories.

In 2006, The Pure Land, a historical novel set in Japan, was published by Canongate Books, and is based on the life of Thomas Blake Glover who is allegedly immortalized in the story of Madame Butterfly.

In 2022, Edinburgh Come All Ye, a collection of poetry, was published by Scotland Street Press.

In 2026 Sailmaker was revived by The Gaiety Theatre, Ayr, and toured Scotland.

- Directed by Liz Carruthers; Lighting Design by Wayne Dowdeswelll; Sound Design & Original Score by Gary Cameron; Set & Costume Design by Claire Halleran
- Cast: Davie (father): Andy Clark; Uncle Billy: Paul J Corrigan; Alec (son): Alexander Tait; Ian (cousin): Lewis Kerr

Alan Spence is a member of the Edinburgh Sri Chinmoy Centre and practises meditation.

== Works ==
Short Stories

- 1977 Its Colours They Are Fine
- 1995 Stone Garden and Other Stories

Novels

- 1990 The Magic Flute
- 1997 Way to Go
- 2006 The Pure Land
- 2013 Night Boat
- 2023 Mister Timeless Blyth

Poems

- 1970 Plop! - 15 Haiku
- 1975 Ah! - 50 Haiku
- 1981 Glasgow Zen
- 2000 Seasons of the Heart
- 2004 Still (with artwork by Alison Watt)
- 2005 Clear Light (poems)
- 2010 Morning Glory (With illustrations by Dame Elizabeth Blackadder)
- 2022 Thirteen Ways of Looking at Tulips (With illustrations by Dame Elizabeth Blackadder)
- 2022 Edinburgh Come All Ye
- 2026 The Particular Silence
- 2026 A Wee Bit Zen

Plays

- 1982 Sailmaker
- 1983 Space Invaders
- 1991 Changed Days
- 1996 On the Line (Not yet published - play about the 1993 Dundee Timex Strike, with music by Ricky Ross)
- 2002 The 3 Estaites: The Millennium Version (Modern Scots adaptation of A Satire of the Three Estates)
- 2015 No Nothing

== Awards ==
- 1996: named Scottish writer of the year.
- 2017: named Edinburgh Makar.
- 2018: Order of the Rising Sun.

== Reviews ==
- Burns, John (1982), review of Glasgow Zen and Sailmaker, in Hearn, Sheila G. (ed.), Cencrastus No. 10, Autumn 1982, pp. 42 & 43, ISSN 0264-0856
- 'Kathryn' for Theatre and Tonic, 7 March 2026.
- Cooper, Neil (2026), 'Alan Spence's Sailmaker impresses 35 years after last performance. The Herald, 2026 (no date given on website).
