= Archie Hind =

Scottish writer

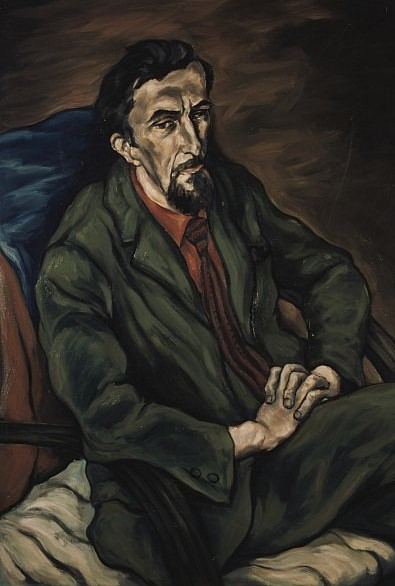
- Archie Hind painted by Alexander Moffat in 1968
- Born: 3 June 1928; Glasgow, Scotland
- Died: 21 February 2008 (aged 79); Glasgow, Scotland
- Education: Newbattle Abbey College
- Occupations: Novelist and playwright
- Spouse: Eleanor Hind (née Slane) (m. 1952; died 2008)
- Children: 5
- Writing career
- Years active: 1966–2008
- Genre: Realism
- Notable works: The Dear Green Place; Fur Sadie (incomplete)
- Literary movement: Working class literature

Archie Hind (Born Archibald Hind Jr., 3 June 1928 – 21 February 2008), was a Scottish novelist and playwright and was the author of the novel The Dear Green Place.

== Early life ==
Hind was born to Archibald Taylor (Archie Sr.) Hind and Margaret Duff Hind (née Miller). He had two siblings, Allan and John Hind, and a younger sister. Raised in poverty in the Carntyne district of Glasgow, Hind's father, Archie Sr., a stoker on locomotive engines, suffered from mental health problems which, coupled with other frustrations, led to frequent incidents of domestic violence. Archie Jr. often had to avoid the public baths because of bruises caused by his father's abuse. Due to financial hardship, Hind was under pressure to leave school and take on menial jobs, eventually being called up to serve in the medical corps in Singapore and Ceylon at the end of World War II. After he was demobbed, he was determined to become a writer. His big break came when he was accepted in 1950–51 to study a creative course at Newbattle Abbey College, Midlothian, where the principal, Orcadian poet Edwin Muir, reportedly became his mentor and helped inspire him.

== Life and work ==
The Dear Green Place, published in 1966, was his only completed work, but it won four major awards and has been listed as one of the best 100 Scottish novels of all time. The title refers to a colloquial nickname for Hind's birthplace and hometown of Glasgow.

Many references are made within the novel to Hind's wife, Eleanor, as the character 'Helen', as well as her parents John and Sonia Slane (née Zam), whose characters are portrayed in the story as well off, intellectual, and disapproving. Slane's family, the Zams, were Russian Jews who had fled political and religious persecution in Ukraine, arriving in Scotland between 1904 and 1912, and settling at first in Glasgow. The novel was largely biographical and many elements are true to actual events.

The success of the novel turned Hind from a trolleybus driver and former slaughterhouse worker into a successful and notable writer. He won 1966's Guardian First Book Award. Hind went on to publish journalistic articles and wrote several plays and theatrical revues, notably for Glasgow's Citizen's Theatre.

=== Fur Sadie ===
The Dear Green Place had a number of reprintings over the decades, and was again reprinted in March 2008 published in conjunction with Hind's incomplete novel, Fur Sadie, as two novels in one volume. Hind spent considerable time on Fur Sadie without finishing it, and the manuscript was assumed to have been lost or destroyed until it was rediscovered and edited by Hind's best friend, the poet, writer and artist, Alasdair Gray and journalist/literary agent John Linklater.

Originally titled Für Sadie, because Hind was influenced by Beethoven's piece Für Elise, the umlaut was later dropped to reflect Glasgow dialect. The story centers around the character of Sadie, a housewife in the Parkhead district of Glasgow who rediscovers her childhood love for the piano.

== Personal life ==
Archie Hind was survived by his wife of 56 years, Eleanor (née Slane), sons Callum and Martin, and daughters Sheila and Helen. A third son, Gavin, died in a road accident in 1976 at the age of 23. Hind also had a number of grandchildren and great-grandchildren.

The family also had a strong interest in political action tied into their working-class roots; Hind was often referred to as "Trotsky" due to his Socialist beliefs.

== Death ==
Hind died from cancer, aged 79, on 21 February 2008. He had been due to appear on 7 March 2008 with famous writers from around the world at the Aye Write! literary festival in Glasgow's Mitchell Library to mark the reprinting of The Dear Green Place, along with the Fur Sadie manuscript and examples of his writing.
