= ECFS =

ECFS may refer to:

- ECFS (cable system), a submarine telecommunication system
- Electronic Case Filing System
- Empire Central Flying School, a Royal Air Force training unit active during the Second World War, now the defunct RAF College of Air Warfare
- Ethical Culture Fieldston School in New York City

== See also ==
- ECF (disambiguation)
