= Ronald Jack =

Scottish scholar

Ronald Dyce Sadler Jack FRSE (3 April 1941, in Ayr – 14 December 2016, in Edinburgh) was a scholar of Scottish literature and medieval literature and professor at the University of Edinburgh.

== Education ==
Jack studied at Ayr Academy and then at Glasgow University (1959–1964) where he achieved First Class Honours in English Language and Literature. He completed his PhD at the University of Edinburgh (1964–1968) under Professor Jack MacQueen on the topic "The Scottish Sonnet and Renaissance Poetry".

== Academic Career at the University of Edinburgh ==
- Assistant Lecturer: 1965
- Lecturer: 1968
- Reader: 1978
- Personal Chair, Scottish and Medieval Literature: 1987–2004
- Professor Emeritus/Honorary Fellow: 2004
- Honorary Research Fellow: 2007

== Awards ==
- University of Glasgow: D.Litt.,1990
- Fellow of the Royal Society of Edinburgh, 2000

== Research ==
His academic work focused on medieval and renaissance Scottish literature, Scottish literature in translation, Italian influences in Scottish literature and culture, Robert Burns, J. M. Barrie, Alexander Montgomerie, and other subjects.

== Works ==
- Robert Maclellan's Jamie the Saxt (Calder and Boyars, 1972), edited, with Ian Campbell
- The Italian Influence on Scottish Literature (Edinburgh University Press, 1972)
- Scottish Prose 1550–1700 (Calder and Boyars, 1972)
- A Choice of Scottish Verse 1560–1660 (Hodder and Stoughton, 1978)
- The Art of Robert Burns (1982), edited, with Andrew Noble
- Sir Thomas Urquhart, "The Jewel" (Scottish Academic Press, 1984), with R. J. Lyall
- Alexander Montgomerie (Scottish Writers Series: Scottish Academic Press, 1985)
- Scotland's Literary Debt to Italy (Edinburgh University Press/ Instituto Italiano di Cultura, 1986)
- Leopardi: A Scottis Quair (Edinburgh University Press, 1987), with M. L. McLaughlin and Christopher Whyte
- The History of Scottish Literature, Volume 1, Origins to 1660 (Aberdeen University Press, 1988), edited
- Patterns of Divine Comedy in Medieval Drama (Boydell and Brewer,1989)
- The Road to the Never Land: A Re-assessment of J.M. Barrie's Dramatic Art (Aberdeen University Press, March 1991)
- The Poetry of William Dunbar (Glasgow, 1996), as part of the Scotnotes series published by Association for Scottish Literary Studies
- J. M. Barrie: Myths and the Mythmaker (Rodopi, 2010)

== Jack Medal ==
In 2018, the International Association for the Study of Scottish Literatures launched the Jack Medal, named in Jack's honour. The medal is awarded every year for the best newly published academic article on a subject dealing with Scottish literature and related to reception and/or diaspora.

Jack Medal Awardees

- 2018: Nikki Hessell, Stephen Clothier
- 2019: Céline Sabiron
- 2020: Anna Fancett
- 2021: Bryony Coombs
- 2022: Nigel Leask, Peadar Ó Muircheartaigh
