= ECF =

ECF may refer to:

== Science, technology and medicine ==
- East Coast fever or theileriosis, a disease of cattle in Africa
- Electrochemical fluorination
- Elemental chlorine free, a form of paper bleaching
- Enterocutaneous fistula
- Evolving classification function
- Extracellular fluid
- Eye-controlled focusing
- ECF, a chemotherapy regimen

== Sport ==
- Eastern Conference Finals, the finals of the Eastern Conference portion of the playoff bracket in the NBA (National Basketball Association) or NHL (National Hockey League), the winner of which typically advances to the final stage of its tournament to play for the championship
- English Chess Federation
- European Curling Federation

== Sustainable development ==
- European Climate Foundation
- European Climate Forum
- European Cyclists' Federation

== Other uses ==
- Eighteenth-Century Fiction, an academic journal
- Electronic court filing
- Enterprise Capital Fund, in the United Kingdom
- European Cultural Foundation
- Economic Cooperation Foundation, in Israel
- Evangelize China Fellowship
