= Scottish literature =

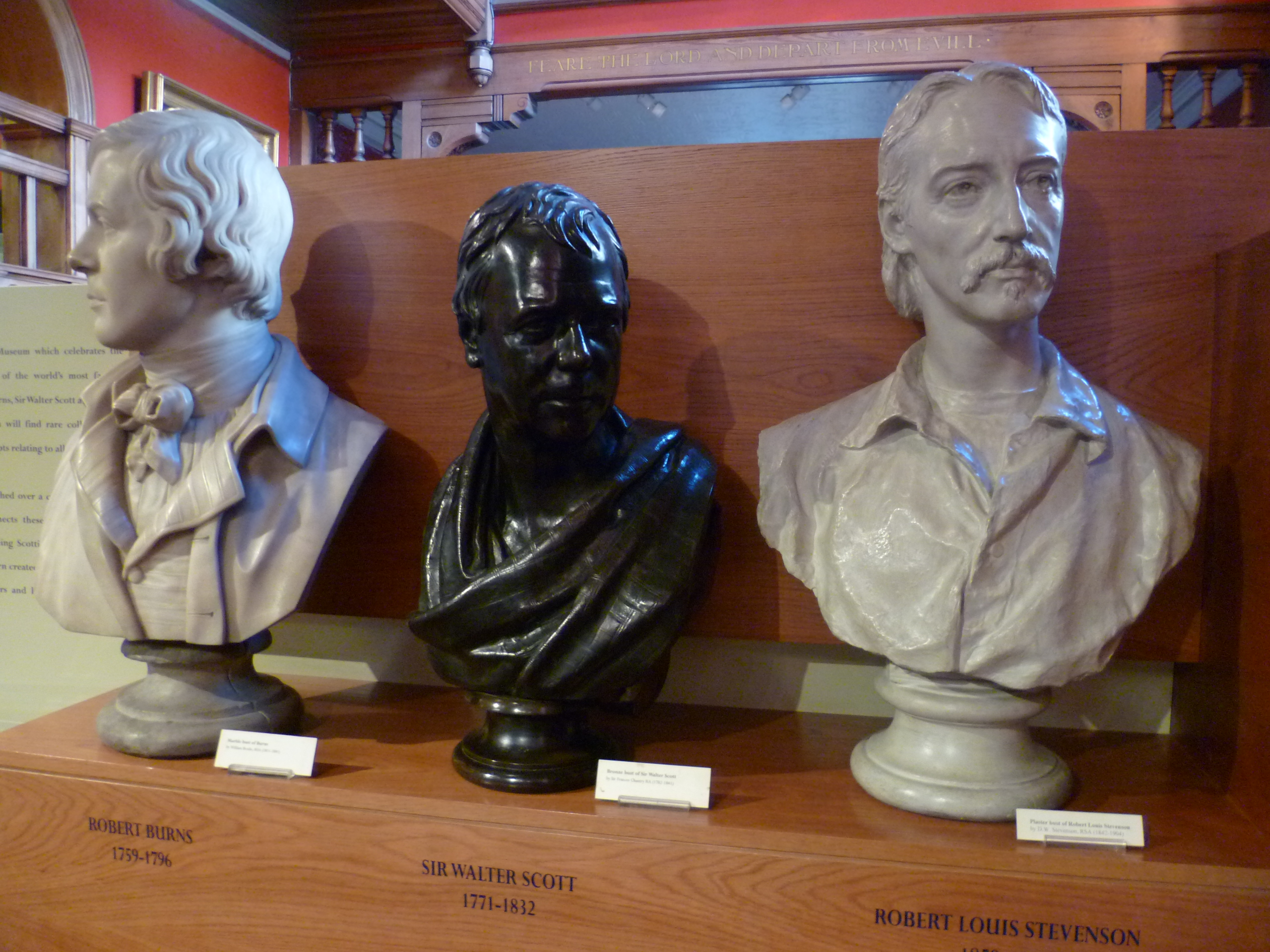
Three great men of Scottish literature: busts of Burns, Scott and Stevenson

Scottish literature is literature written in Scotland or by Scottish writers. It includes works in English, Scottish Gaelic, Scots, Brythonic, French, Latin, Norn or other languages written within the modern boundaries of Scotland.

The earliest extant literature written in what is now Scotland, was composed in Brythonic speech in the sixth century and has survived as part of Welsh literature. In the following centuries there was literature in Latin, under the influence of the Catholic Church, and in Old English, brought by Anglian settlers. As the state of Alba developed into the kingdom of Scotland from the eighth century, there was a flourishing literary elite who regularly produced texts in both Gaelic and Latin, sharing a common literary culture with Ireland and elsewhere. After the Davidian Revolution of the thirteenth century a flourishing French language culture predominated, while Norse literature was produced from areas of Scandinavian settlement. The first surviving major text in Early Scots literature is the fourteenth-century poet John Barbour's epic Brus, which was followed by a series of vernacular versions of medieval romances. These were joined in the fifteenth century by Scots prose works.

In the early modern era royal patronage supported poetry, prose and drama. James V's court saw works such as Sir David Lindsay of the Mount's The Thrie Estaitis. In the late sixteenth century James VI became patron and member of a circle of Scottish court poets and musicians known as the Castalian Band. When he acceded to the English throne in 1603 many followed him to the new court, but without a centre of royal patronage the tradition of Scots poetry subsided. It was revived after union with England in 1707 by figures including Allan Ramsay and James Macpherson. The latter's Ossian Cycle made him the first Scottish poet to gain an international reputation. He helped inspire Robert Burns, considered by many to be the national poet, and Walter Scott, whose Waverley Novels did much to define Scottish identity in the nineteenth century. Towards the end of the Victorian era a number of Scottish-born authors achieved international reputations, including Robert Louis Stevenson, Arthur Conan Doyle, J. M. Barrie and George MacDonald.

In the twentieth century there was a surge of activity in Scottish literature, known as the Scottish Renaissance. The leading figure, Hugh MacDiarmid, attempted to revive the Scots language as a medium for serious literature. Members of the movement were followed by a new generation of post-war poets including Edwin Morgan, who would be appointed the first Scots Makar by the inaugural Scottish government in 2004. From the 1980s Scottish literature enjoyed another major revival, particularly associated with writers including James Kelman and Irvine Welsh. Scottish poets who emerged in the same period included Carol Ann Duffy, who was named as the first Scot to be UK Poet Laureate in May 2009.

== Middle Ages ==
=== Early Middle Ages ===
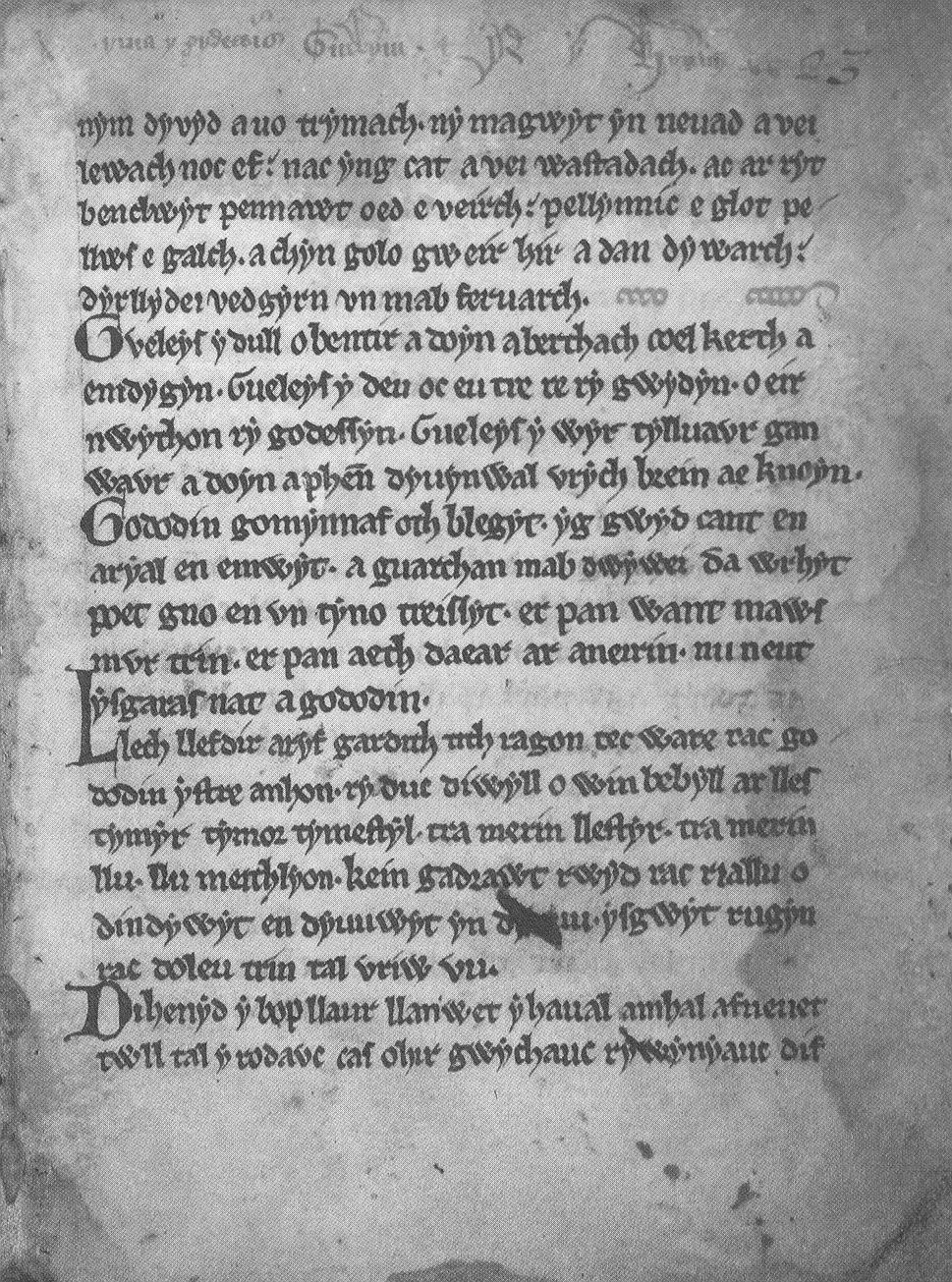
A page from the Book of Aneirin, containing part of the Gododdin, c. sixth century

After the collapse of Roman authority in the early fifth century, four major circles of political and cultural influence emerged in Northern Britain. In the east were the Picts, whose kingdoms eventually stretched from the river Forth to Shetland. In the west were the Gaelic (Goidelic)-speaking people of Dál Riata, who had close links with Ireland, from where they brought with them the name Scots. In the south were the British (Brythonic-speaking) descendants of the peoples of the Roman-influenced kingdoms of "The Old North", the most powerful and longest surviving of which was the Kingdom of Strathclyde. Finally, there were the English or "Angles", Germanic invaders who had overrun much of southern Britain and held the Kingdom of Bernicia (later the northern part of Northumbria), which reached into what are now the Lothians and the Scotiish Borders in the south-east. To these Christianisation, particularly from the sixth century, added Latin as an intellectual and written language. Modern scholarship, based on surviving placenames and historical evidence, indicates that the Picts spoke a Brythonic language, but none of their literature seems to have survived into the modern era. However, there is surviving literature from what would become Scotland in Brythonic, Gaelic, Latin and Old English.

Much of the earliest Welsh literature was actually composed in or near the country we now call Scotland, in the Brythonic speech, from which Welsh would be derived, which was not then confined to Wales and Cornwall, although it was only written down in Wales much later. These include The Gododdin, considered the earliest surviving verse from Scotland, which is attributed to the bard Aneirin, said to have been resident in Brythonic kingdom of Gododdin in the sixth century. It is a series of elegies to the men of the Gododdin killed fighting at the Battle of Catraeth around 600 AD. Similarly, the Battle of Gwen Ystrad is attributed to Taliesin, traditionally thought to be a bard at the court of Rheged in roughly the same period.

There are religious works in Gaelic including the Elegy for St Columba by Dallan Forgaill, c. 597 and "In Praise of St Columba" by Beccan mac Luigdech of Rum, c. 677. In Latin they include a "Prayer for Protection" (attributed to St Mugint), c. mid-sixth century and Altus Prosator ("The High Creator", attributed to St Columba), c. 597. What is arguably the most important medieval work written in Scotland, the Vita Columbae, by Adomnán, abbot of Iona (627/8–704), was also written in Latin. The next most important piece of Scottish hagiography, the verse Life of St. Ninian, was written in Latin in Whithorn in the eighth century.

In Old English there is The Dream of the Rood, from which lines are found on the Ruthwell Cross, making it the only surviving fragment of Northumbrian Old English from early Medieval Scotland. It has also been suggested on the basis of ornithological references that the poem The Seafarer was composed somewhere near the Bass Rock in East Lothian.

=== High Middle Ages ===
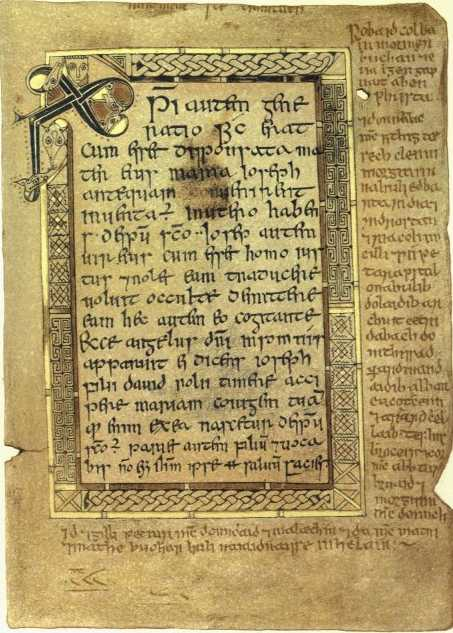
Book of Deer, folio 5r, containing the text of the Gospel of Matthew from 1:18 through 1:21

Beginning in the later eighth century, Viking raids and invasions may have forced a merger of the Gaelic and Pictish crowns that culminated in the rise of Cínaed mac Ailpín (Kenneth MacAlpin) in the 840s, which brought to power the House of Alpin and the creation of the Kingdom of Alba. Historical sources, as well as place name evidence, indicate the ways in which the Pictish language in the north and Cumbric languages in the south were overlaid and replaced by Gaelic, Old English and later Norse. The Kingdom of Alba was overwhelmingly an oral society dominated by Gaelic culture. Our fuller sources for Ireland of the same period suggest that there would have been filidh, who acted as poets, musicians and historians, often attached to the court of a lord or king, and passed on their knowledge and culture in Gaelic to the next generation.

From the eleventh century French, Flemish and particularly English became the main languages of Scottish burghs, most of which were located in the south and east. At least from the accession of David I (r. 1124–53), as part of a Davidian Revolution that introduced French culture and political systems, Gaelic ceased to be the main language of the royal court and was probably replaced by French. After this "gallicisation" of the Scottish court, a less highly regarded order of bards took over the functions of the filidh and they would continue to act in a similar role in the Highlands and Islands into the eighteenth century. They often trained in bardic schools, of which a few, like the one run by the MacMhuirich dynasty, who were bards to the Lord of the Isles, existed in Scotland and a larger number in Ireland, until they were suppressed from the seventeenth century. Members of bardic schools were trained in the complex rules and forms of Gaelic poetry. Much of their work was never written down and what survives was only recorded from the sixteenth century.

It is possible that more Middle Irish literature was written in medieval Scotland than is often thought, but has not survived because the Gaelic literary establishment of eastern Scotland died out before the fourteenth century. Thomas Owen Clancy has argued that the Lebor Bretnach, the so-called "Irish Nennius", was written in Scotland, and probably at the monastery in Abernethy, but this text survives only from manuscripts preserved in Ireland. Other literary work that has survived includes that of the prolific poet Gille Brighde Albanach. About 1218, Gille Brighde wrote a poem—Heading for Damietta—on his experiences of the Fifth Crusade.

In the thirteenth century, French flourished as a literary language, and produced the Roman de Fergus, the earliest piece of non-Celtic vernacular literature to survive from Scotland. Many other stories in the Arthurian Cycle, written in French and preserved only outside Scotland, are thought by some scholars including D. D. R. Owen, to have been written in Scotland. There is some Norse literature from areas of Scandinavian settlement, such as the Northern Isles and the Western Isles. The famous Orkneyinga Saga however, although it pertains to the Earldom of Orkney, was written in Iceland. In addition to French, Latin too was a literary language, with works that include the "Carmen de morte Sumerledi", a poem which exults triumphantly the victory of the citizens of Glasgow over Somairle mac Gilla Brigte and the "Inchcolm Antiphoner", a hymn in praise of St. Columba.

=== Late Middle Ages ===
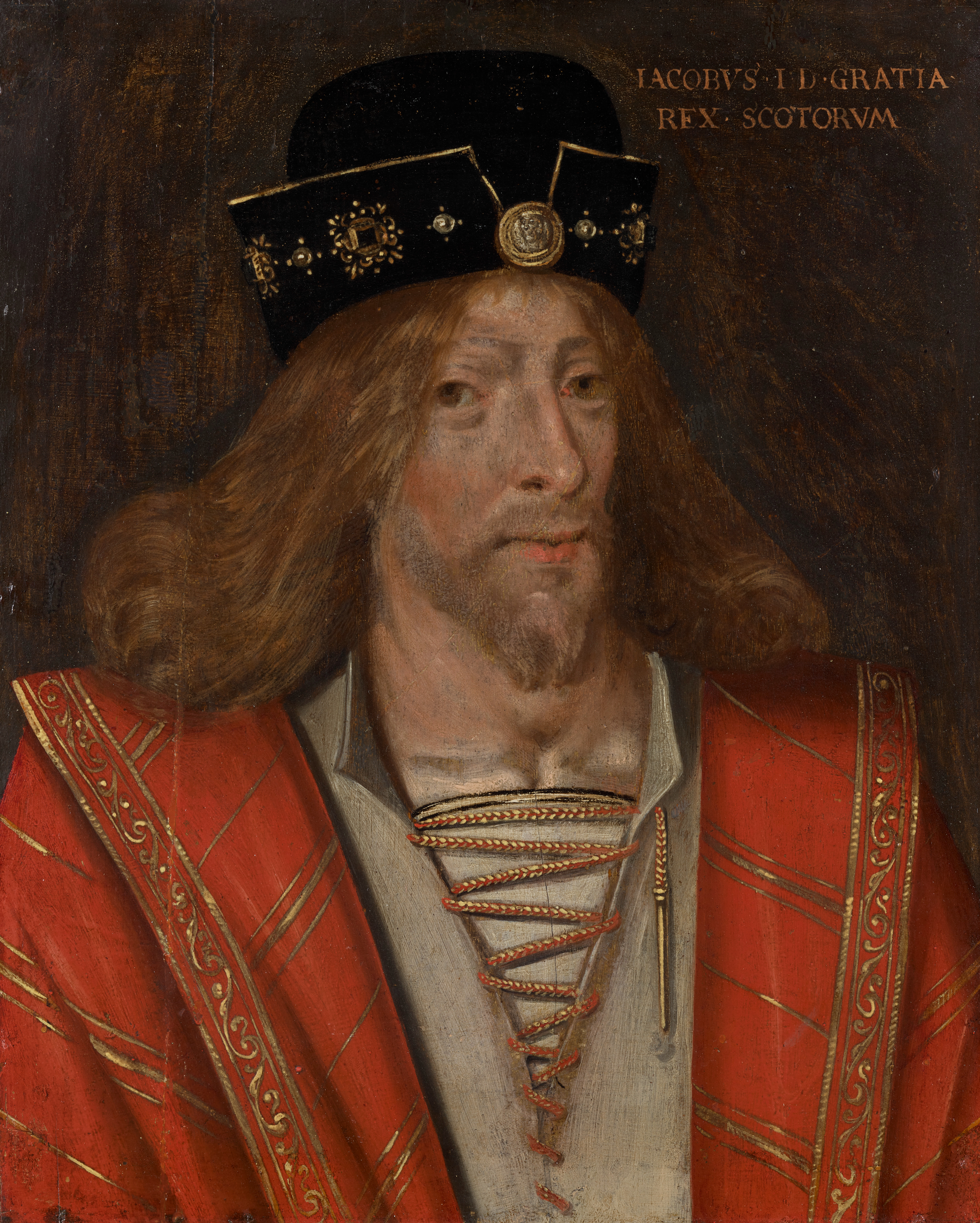
James I, who spent much of his life imprisoned in England, where he gained a reputation as a musician and poet

In the late Middle Ages, early Scots, often simply called English, became the dominant language of the country. It was derived largely from Old English, with the addition of elements from Gaelic and French. Although resembling the language spoken in northern England, it became a distinct dialect from the late fourteenth century onwards. It began to be adopted by the ruling elite as they gradually abandoned French. By the fifteenth century it was the language of government, with acts of parliament, council records and treasurer's accounts almost all using it from the reign of James I onwards. As a result, Gaelic, once dominant north of the River Tay, began a steady decline. Lowland writers began to treat Gaelic as a second class, rustic and even amusing language, helping to frame attitudes towards the highlands and to create a cultural gulf with the lowlands.

The first surviving major text in Scots literature is John Barbour's Brus (1375), composed under the patronage of Robert II and telling the story in epic poetry of Robert I's actions before the English invasion until the end of the war of independence. The work was extremely popular among the Scots-speaking aristocracy and Barbour is referred to as the father of Scots poetry, holding a similar place to his contemporary Chaucer in England. In the early fifteenth century these were followed by Andrew of Wyntoun's verse Orygynale Cronykil of Scotland and Blind Harry's The Wallace, which blended historical romance with the verse chronicle. They were probably influenced by Scots versions of popular French romances that were also produced in the period, including The Buik of Alexander, Launcelot o the Laik and The Porteous of Noblenes by Gilbert Hay.

Much Middle Scots literature was produced by makars, poets with links to the royal court, which included James I (who wrote The Kingis Quair). Many of the makars had university education and so were also connected with the Kirk. However, Dunbar's Lament for the Makaris (c.1505) provides evidence of a wider tradition of secular writing outside of Court and Kirk now largely lost. Before the advent of printing in Scotland, writers such as Robert Henryson, William Dunbar, Walter Kennedy and Gavin Douglas have been seen as leading a golden age in Scottish poetry.

In the late fifteenth century, Scots prose also began to develop as a genre. Although there are earlier fragments of original Scots prose, such as the Auchinleck Chronicle, the first complete surviving work includes John Ireland's The Meroure of Wyssdome (1490). There were also prose translations of French books of chivalry that survive from the 1450s, including The Book of the Law of Armys and the Order of Knychthode and the treatise Secreta Secretorum, an Arabic work believed to be Aristotle's advice to Alexander the Great. The establishment of a printing press under royal patent in 1507 would begin to make it easier to disseminate Scottish literature and was probably aimed at bolstering Scottish national identity. The first Scottish press was established in Southgait in Edinburgh by the merchant Walter Chepman (c. 1473–c. 1528) and the bookseller Andrew Myllar (f. 1505–08). Although the first press was relatively short lived, beside law codes and religious works, the press also produced editions of the work of Scottish makars before its demise, probably about 1510. The next recorded press was that of Thomas Davidson (f. 1532–42), the first in a long line of "king's printers", who also produced editions of works of the makars. The landmark work in the reign of James IV was Gavin Douglas's version of Virgil's Aeneid, the Eneados, which was the first complete translation of a major classical text in the Scots language and the first successful example of its kind in any Anglic language. It was finished in 1513, but overshadowed by the disaster at Flodden.

== Early modern era ==
=== Sixteenth century ===
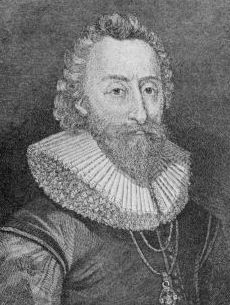
William Alexander, statesman and author

As a patron of poets and authors James V (r. 1513–42) supported William Stewart and John Bellenden, who translated the Latin History of Scotland compiled in 1527 by Hector Boece, into verse and prose. David Lyndsay (c. 1486–1555), diplomat and the head of the Lyon Court, was a prolific poet. He wrote elegiac narratives, romances and satires. George Buchanan (1506–82) had a major influence as a Latin poet, founding a tradition of neo-Latin poetry that would continue in to the seventeenth century. Contributors to this tradition included royal secretary John Maitland (1537–95), reformer Andrew Melville (1545–1622), John Johnston (1570?–1611) and David Hume of Godscroft (1558–1629).

From the 1550s, in the reign of Mary, Queen of Scots (r. 1542–67) and the minority of her son James VI (r. 1567–1625), cultural pursuits were limited by the lack of a royal court and by political turmoil. The Kirk, heavily influenced by Calvinism, also discouraged poetry that was not devotional in nature. Nevertheless, poets from this period included Richard Maitland of Lethington (1496–1586), who produced meditative and satirical verses in the style of Dunbar; John Rolland (fl. 1530–75), who wrote allegorical satires in the tradition of Douglas and courtier and minister Alexander Hume (c. 1556–1609), whose corpus of work includes nature poetry and epistolary verse. Alexander Scott's (?1520–82/3) use of short verse designed to be sung to music, opened the way for the Castilan poets of James VI's adult reign.

In the 1580s and 1590s James VI strongly promoted the literature of the country of his birth in Scots. His treatise, Some Rules and Cautions to be Observed and Eschewed in Scottish Prosody, published in 1584 when he was aged 18, was both a poetic manual and a description of the poetic tradition in his mother tongue, to which he applied Renaissance principles. He became patron and member of a loose circle of Scottish Jacobean court poets and musicians, later called the Castalian Band, which included William Fowler (c. 1560–1612), John Stewart of Baldynneis (c. 1545–c. 1605), and Alexander Montgomerie (c. 1550–98). They translated key Renaissance texts and produced poems using French forms, including sonnets and short sonnets, for narrative, nature description, satire and meditations on love. Later poets that followed in this vein included William Alexander (c. 1567–1640), Alexander Craig (c. 1567–1627) and Robert Ayton (1570–1627). By the late 1590s the king's championing of his native Scottish tradition was to some extent diffused by the prospect of inheriting of the English throne.

Lyndsay produced an interlude at Linlithgow Palace for the king and queen thought to be a version of his play The Thrie Estaitis in 1540, which satirised the corruption of church and state, and which is the only complete play to survive from before the Reformation. Buchanan was major influence on Continental theatre with plays such as Jepheths and Baptistes, which influenced Pierre Corneille and Jean Racine and through them the neo-classical tradition in French drama, but his impact in Scotland was limited by his choice of Latin as a medium. The anonymous The Maner of the Cyring of ane Play (before 1568) and Philotus (published in London in 1603), are isolated examples of surviving plays. The latter is a vernacular Scots comedy of errors, probably designed for court performance for Mary, Queen of Scots or James VI. The same system of professional companies of players and theatres that developed in England in this period was absent in Scotland, but James VI signalled his interest in drama by arranging for a company of English players to erect a playhouse and perform in 1599.

=== Seventeenth century ===
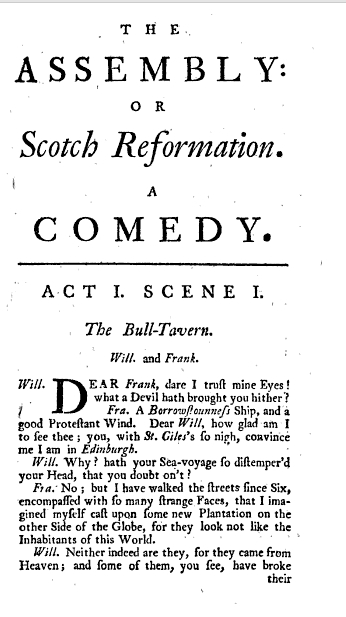
The first page of The Assembly by Archibald Pitcairne from the 1766 edition

Having extolled the virtues of Scots "poesie", following his accession to the English throne, James VI increasingly favoured the language of southern England. In 1611 the Kirk adopted the English Authorised King James Version of the Bible. In 1617 interpreters were declared no longer necessary in the port of London because Scots and Englishmen were now "not so far different bot ane understandeth ane uther". Jenny Wormald, describes James as creating a "three-tier system, with Gaelic at the bottom and English at the top". The loss of the court as a centre of patronage in 1603 was a major blow to Scottish literature. A number of Scottish poets, including William Alexander, John Murray and Robert Aytoun accompanied the king to London, where they continued to write, but they soon began to anglicise their written language. James's characteristic role as active literary participant and patron in the English court made him a defining figure for English Renaissance poetry and drama, which would reach a pinnacle of achievement in his reign, but his patronage for the high style in his own Scottish tradition largely became sidelined. The only significant court poet to continue to work in Scotland after the king's departure was William Drummond of Hawthornden (1585–1649).

As the tradition of classical Gaelic poetry declined, a new tradition of vernacular Gaelic poetry began to emerge. While Classical poetry used a language largely fixed in the twelfth century, the vernacular continued to develop. In contrast to the Classical tradition, which used syllabic metre, vernacular poets tended to use stressed metre. However, they shared with the Classic poets a set of complex metaphors and role, as the verse was still often panegyric. A number of these vernacular poets were women, such as Mary MacLeod of Harris (c. 1615–1707).

The tradition of neo-Latin poetry reached its fruition with the publication of the anthology of the Deliciae Poetarum Scotorum (1637), published in Amsterdam by Arthur Johnston (c. 1579–1641) and Sir John Scott of Scotstarvet (1585–1670) and containing work by the major Scottish practitioners since Buchanan. This period was marked by the work of the first named female Scottish poets. Elizabeth Melville's (f. 1585–1630) Ane Godlie Dream (1603) was a popular religious allegory and the first book published by a woman in Scotland. Anna Hume, daughter of David Hume of Godscroft, adapted Petrarch's Triumphs as Triumphs of Love: Chastitie: Death (1644).

This was the period when the ballad emerged as a significant written form in Scotland. Some ballads may date back to the late medieval era and deal with events and people that can be traced back as far as the thirteenth century, including "Sir Patrick Spens" and "Thomas the Rhymer", but which are not known to have existed until the eighteenth century. They were probably composed and transmitted orally and only began to be written down and printed, often as broadsides and as part of chapbooks, later being recorded and noted in books by collectors including Robert Burns and Walter Scott. From the seventeenth century they were used as a literary form by aristocratic authors including Robert Sempill (c. 1595–c. 1665), Lady Elizabeth Wardlaw (1627–1727) and Lady Grizel Baillie (1645–1746).

The loss of a royal court also meant there was no force to counter the kirk's dislike of theatre, which struggled to survive in Scotland. However, it was not entirely extinguished. The kirk used theatre for its own purposes in schools and was slow to suppress popular folk dramas. Surviving plays for the period include William Alexander's Monarchicke Tragedies, written just before his departure with the king for England in 1603. They were closet dramas, designed to be read rather than performed, and already indicate Alexander's preference for southern English over the Scots language. There were some attempts to revive Scottish drama. In 1663 Edinburgh lawyer William Clerke wrote Marciano or the Discovery, a play about the restoration of a legitimate dynasty in Florence after many years of civil war. It was performed at the Tennis-Court Theatre at Holyrood Palace before the parliamentary high commissioner John Leslie, Earl of Rothes. Thomas Sydsurf's Tarugo's Wiles or the Coffee House, was first performed in London in 1667 and then in Edinburgh the year after and drew on Spanish comedy. A relative of Sydsurf, physician Archibald Pitcairne (1652–1713) wrote The Assembly or Scotch Reformation (1692), a ribald satire on the morals of the Presbyterian kirk, circulating in manuscript, but not published until 1722, helping to secure the association between Jacobitism and professional drama that discouraged the creation of professional theatre.

== Eighteenth century ==
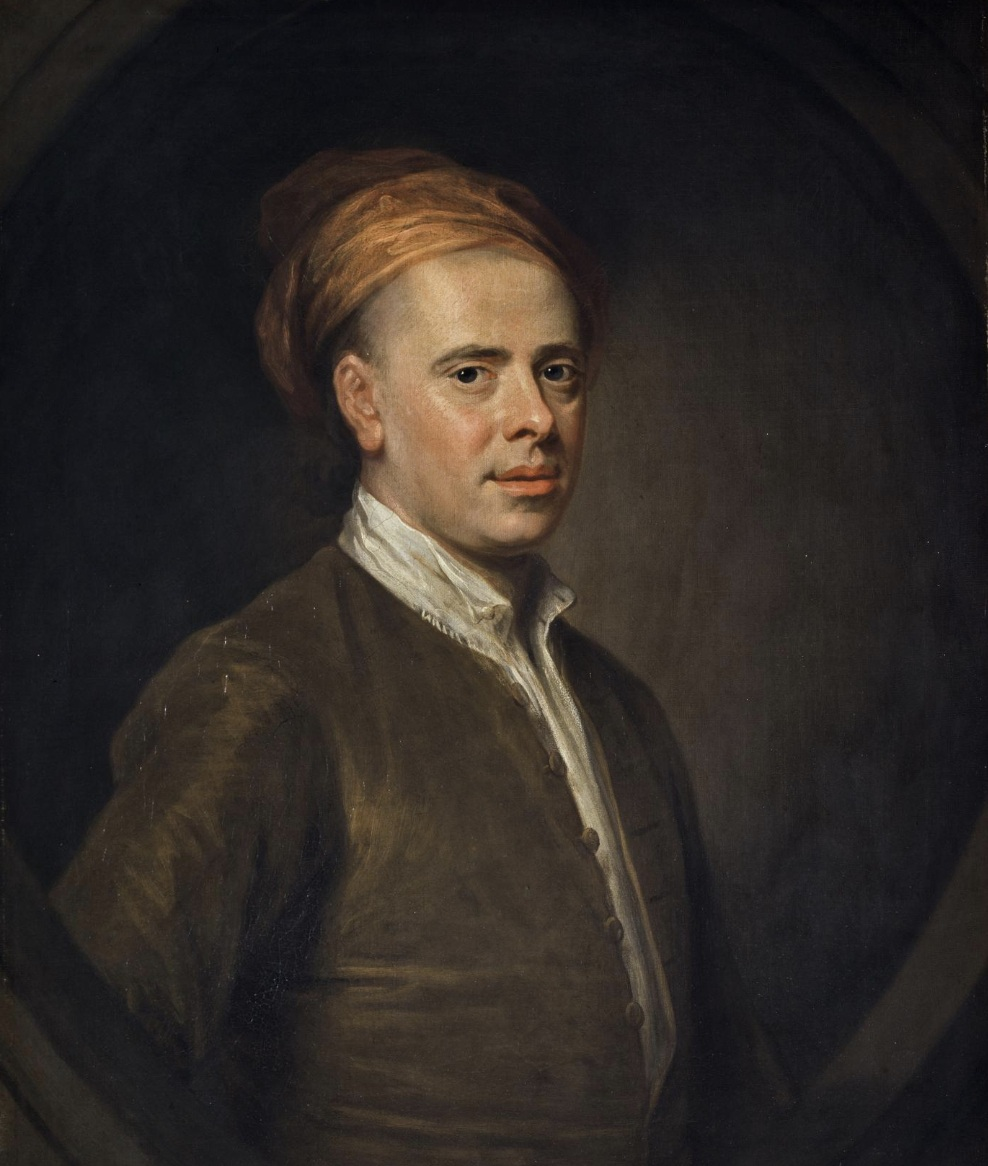
Allan Ramsay, the most influential literary figure in early eighteenth-century Scotland

After the Union in 1707 and the shift of political power to England, the use of Scots was discouraged by many in authority and education. Nevertheless, Scots remained the vernacular of many rural communities and the growing number of urban working-class Scots. Literature developed a distinct national identity and began to enjoy an international reputation. Allan Ramsay (1686–1758) was the most important literary figure of the era, often described as leading a "vernacular revival". He laid the foundations of a reawakening of interest in older Scottish literature, publishing The Ever Green (1724), a collection that included many major poetic works of the Stewart period. He led the trend for pastoral poetry, helping to develop the Habbie stanza, which would be later be used by Robert Burns as a poetic form. His Tea-Table Miscellany (1724–37) contained poems old Scots folk material, his own poems in the folk style and "gentilizings" of Scots poems in the English neo-classical style. His pastoral opera The Gentle Shepherd was one of the most influential works of the era. He would also play a leading role in supporting drama in Scotland and the attempt to found a permanent theatre in the capital.

Ramsay was part of a community of poets working in Scots and English. These included William Hamilton of Gilbertfield (c. 1665–1751), Robert Crawford (1695–1733), Alexander Ross (1699–1784), the Jacobite William Hamilton of Bangour (1704–54), socialite Alison Rutherford Cockburn (1712–94), and poet and playwright James Thomson's (1700–48), most famous for the nature poetry of his Seasons. Tobias Smollett (1721–71) was a poet, essayist, satirist and playwright, but is best known for his picaresque novels, such as The Adventures of Roderick Random (1748) and The Adventures of Peregrine Pickle (1751) for which he is often seen as Scotland's first novelist. His work would be a major influence on later novelists such as Thackeray and Dickens.

The early eighteenth century was also a period of innovation in Gaelic vernacular poetry. Major figures included Rob Donn Mackay (1714–78) and Donnchadh Bàn Mac an t-Saoir (Duncan Ban MacIntyre) (1724–1812). The most significant figure in the tradition was Alasdair mac Mhaighstir Alasdair (Alasdair MacDonald) (c. 1698–1770). His interest in traditional forms can be seen in his most significant poem Clanranald's Gallery. He also mixed these traditions with influences from the Lowlands, including Thompson's Seasons, which helped inspire a new form of nature poetry in Gaelic, which was not focused on their relations to human concerns.

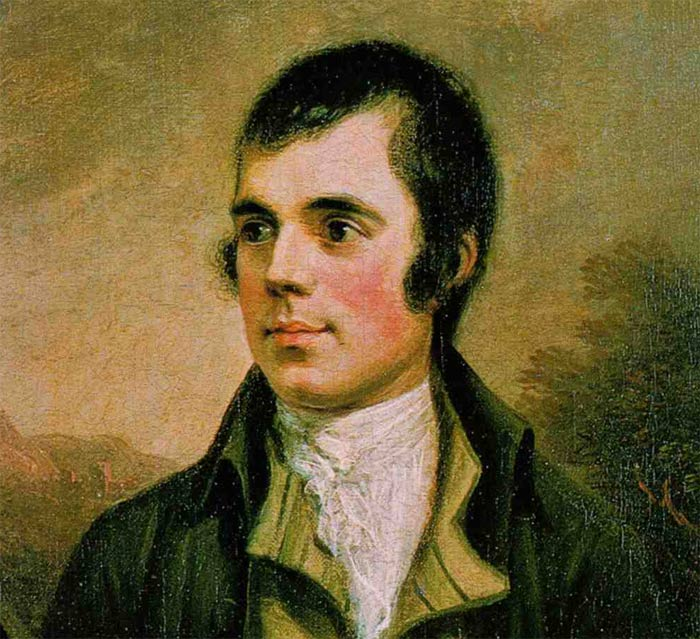
Robert Burns (1759–96) considered by many to be the Scottish national poet

James Macpherson was the first Scottish poet to gain an international reputation, claiming to have found poetry written by Ossian, he published translations that acquired international popularity, being proclaimed as a Celtic equivalent of the Classical epics. Fingal written in 1762 was speedily translated into many European languages, and its deep appreciation of natural beauty and the melancholy tenderness of its treatment of the ancient legend did more than any single work to bring about the Romantic movement in European, and especially in German, literature, influencing Herder and Goethe. Eventually it became clear that the poems were not direct translations from the Gaelic, but flowery adaptations made to suit the aesthetic expectations of his audience.

Robert Burns was highly influenced by the Ossian cycle. Burns, an Ayrshire poet and lyricist, is widely regarded as the national poet of Scotland and a major figure in the Romantic movement. As well as making original compositions, Burns also collected folk songs from across Scotland, often revising or adapting them. His poem (and song) "Auld Lang Syne" is often sung at Hogmanay (the last day of the year), and "Scots Wha Hae" served for a long time as an unofficial national anthem of the country. Burns's poetry drew upon a substantial familiarity with and knowledge of Classical, Biblical, and English literature, as well as the Scottish Makar tradition. Burns was skilled in writing not only in the Scots language but also in the Scottish English dialect of the English language. Some of his works, such as "Love and Liberty" (also known as "The Jolly Beggars"), are written in both Scots and English for various effects. His themes included republicanism, Radicalism, Scottish patriotism, anticlericalism, class inequalities, gender roles, commentary on the Scottish Kirk of his time, Scottish cultural identity, poverty, sexuality, and the beneficial aspects of popular socialising. Other major literary figures connected with Romanticism include the poets and novelists James Hogg (1770–1835), Allan Cunningham (1784–1842) and John Galt (1779–1839).

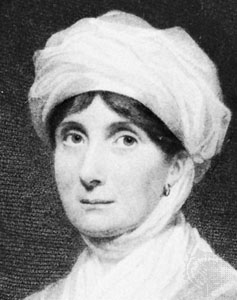
Engraving of playwright Joanna Baillie

Drama was pursued by Scottish playwrights in London such as Catherine Trotter (1679–1749), born in London to Scottish parents and later moving to Aberdeen. Her plays and included the verse-tragedy Fatal Friendship (1698), the comedy Love at a Loss (1700) and the history The Revolution in Sweden (1706). David Crawford's (1665–1726) plays included the Restoration comedies Courtship A-la-Mode (1700) and Love at First Sight (1704). These developed the character of the stage Scot, often a clown, but cunning and loyal. Newburgh Hamilton (1691–1761), born in Ireland of Scottish descent, produced the comedies The Petticoat-Ploter (1712) and The Doating Lovers or The Libertine (1715). He later wrote the libretto for Handel's Samson (1743), closely based on John Milton's Samson Agonistes. James Thomson's plays often dealt with the contest between public duty and private feelings, included Sophonisba (1730), Agamemnon (1738) and Tancrid and Sigismuda (1745), the last of which was an international success. David Mallet's (c. 1705–65) Eurydice (1731) was accused of being a coded Jacobite play and his later work indicates opposition to the Walpole administration. The opera Masque of Alfred (1740) was a collaboration between Thompson, Mallet and composer Thomas Arne, with Thompson supplying the lyrics for his most famous work, the patriotic song "Rule, Britannia!".

In Scotland performances were largely limited to performances by visiting actors, who faced hostility from the Kirk. The Edinburgh Company of Players were able to perform in Dundee, Montrose, Aberdeen and regular performances at the Taylor's Hall in Edinburgh under the protection of a Royal Patent. Ramsay was instrumental in establishing them in a small theatre in Carruber's Close in Edinburgh, but the passing of the 1737 Licensing Act made their activities illegal and the theatre soon closed. A new theatre was opened at Cannongate in 1747 and operated without a licence into the 1760s. In the later eighteenth century, many plays were written for and performed by small amateur companies and were not published and so most have been lost. Towards the end of the century there were "closet dramas", primarily designed to be read, rather than performed, including work by Hogg, Galt and Joanna Baillie (1762–1851), often influenced by the ballad tradition and Gothic Romanticism.

== Nineteenth century ==
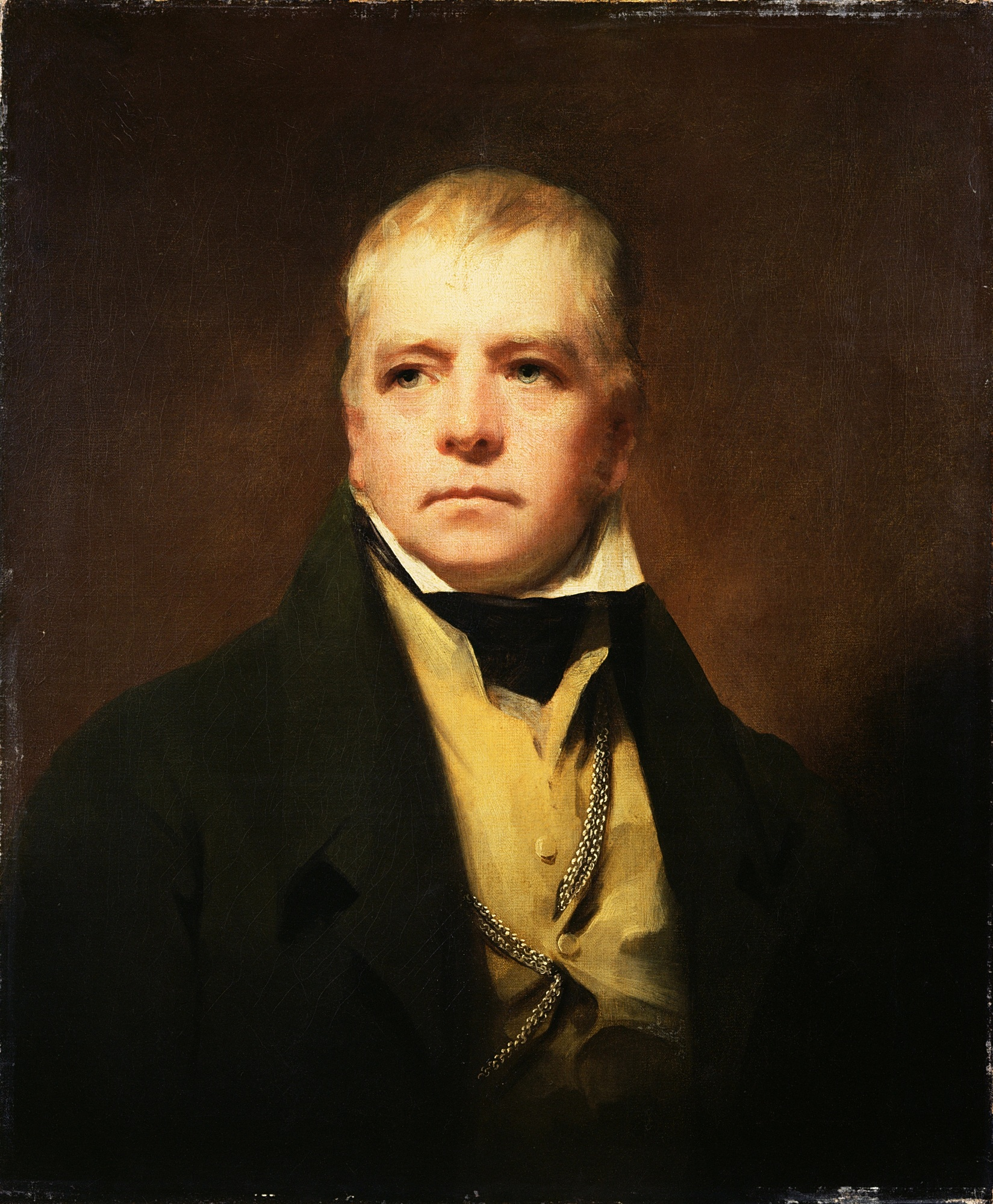
Walter Scott whose Waverley Novels helped define Scottish identity in the 19th century

Scottish poetry is often seen as entering a period of decline in the nineteenth century, with a descent of into infantalism as exemplified by the highly popular Whistle Binkie anthologies (1830–90). However, Scotland continued to produce talented and successful poets, including weaver-poet William Thom (1799–1848), Lady Margaret Maclean Clephane Compton Northampton (d. 1830), William Edmondstoune Aytoun (1813–65) and Thomas Campbell (1777–1844), whose works were extensively reprinted in the period 1800–60. Among the most influential poets of the later nineteenth century were James Thomson (1834–82) and John Davidson (1857–1909), whose work would have a major impact on modernist poets including Hugh MacDiarmid, Wallace Stevens and T. S. Eliot. The Highland Clearances and widespread emigration significantly weakened Gaelic language and culture and had a profound impact on the nature of Gaelic poetry. The best poetry in this vein contained a strong element of protest, including Uilleam Mac Dhun Lèibhe's (William Livingstone, 1808–70) protest against the Islay and Seonaidh Phàdraig Iarsiadair's (John Smith, 1848–81) condemnation of those responsible for the clearances. The best known Gaelic poet of the era was Màiri Mhòr nan Óran (Mary MacPherson, 1821–98), whose evocation of place and mood has made her among the most enduring Gaelic poets.

Walter Scott began as a poet and also collected and published Scottish ballads. His first prose work, Waverley in 1814, is often called the first historical novel. It launched a highly successful career, with other historical novels such as Rob Roy (1817), The Heart of Midlothian (1818) and Ivanhoe (1820). Scott probably did more than any other figure to define and popularise Scottish cultural identity in the nineteenth century.

Scottish "national drama" emerged in the early 1800s, as plays with specifically Scottish themes began to dominate the Scottish stage. The existing repertoire of Scottish-themed plays included John Home's Douglas (1756) and Ramsay's The Gentle Shepherd (1725), with the last two being the most popular plays among amateur groups. Scott was keenly interested in drama, becoming a shareholder in the Theatre Royal, Edinburgh. Baillie's Highland themed The Family Legend was first produced in Edinburgh in 1810 with the help of Scott, as part of a deliberate attempt to stimulate a national Scottish drama. Scott also wrote five plays, of which Hallidon Hill (1822) and MacDuff's Cross (1822), were patriotic Scottish histories. Adaptations of the Waverley novels, largely first performed in minor theatres, rather than the larger Patent theatres, included The Lady in the Lake (1817), The Heart of Midlothian (1819), and Rob Roy, which underwent over 1,000 performances in Scotland in this period. Also adapted for the stage were Guy Mannering, The Bride of Lammermoor and The Abbot. These highly popular plays saw the social range and size of the audience for theatre expand and helped shape theatre-going practices in Scotland for the rest of the century.

Scotland was also the location of two of the most important literary magazines of the era, The Edinburgh Review, founded in 1802 and Blackwood's Magazine, founded in 1817. Together they had a major impact on the development of British literature and drama in the era of Romanticism.

Thomas Carlyle, in such works as Sartor Resartus (1833–34), The French Revolution: A History (1837) and On Heroes, Hero-Worship, & the Heroic in History (1841), profoundly influenced philosophy and literature of the age.

In the late 19th century, a number of Scottish-born authors achieved international reputations. Robert Louis Stevenson's work included the urban Gothic novella Strange Case of Dr Jekyll and Mr Hyde (1886), and played a major part in developing the historical adventure in books like Kidnapped and Treasure Island. Arthur Conan Doyle's Sherlock Holmes stories helped found the tradition of detective fiction. The "kailyard tradition" at the end of the century, brought elements of fantasy and folklore back into fashion as can be seen in the work of figures like J. M. Barrie, most famous for his creation of Peter Pan and George MacDonald whose works including Phantastes played a major part in the creation of the fantasy genre.

== Twentieth century to the present ==
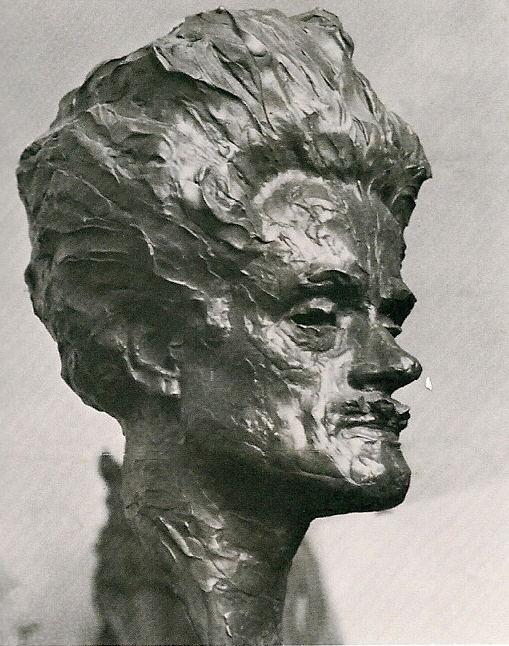
A bust of Hugh MacDiarmid sculpted in 1927 by William Lamb

In the early twentieth century there was a new surge of activity in Scottish literature, influenced by modernism and resurgent nationalism, known as the Scottish Renaissance. The leading figure in the movement was Hugh MacDiarmid (the pseudonym of Christopher Murray Grieve). MacDiarmid attempted to revive the Scots language as a medium for serious literature in poetic works including "A Drunk Man Looks at the Thistle" (1936), developing a form of Synthetic Scots that combined different regional dialects and archaic terms. Other writers that emerged in this period, and are often treated as part of the movement, include the poets Edwin Muir and William Soutar, the novelists Neil Gunn, George Blake, Nan Shepherd, A. J. Cronin, Naomi Mitchison, Eric Linklater and Lewis Grassic Gibbon, and the playwright James Bridie. All were born within a fifteen-year period (1887–1901) and, although they cannot be described as members of a single school they all pursued an exploration of identity, rejecting nostalgia and parochialism and engaging with social and political issues. This period saw the emergence of a tradition of popular or working class theatre. Hundreds of amateur groups were established, particularly in the growing urban centres of the Lowlands. Amateur companies encouraged native playwrights, including Robert McLellan.

Some writers that emerged after the Second World War followed MacDiarmid by writing in Scots, including Robert Garioch and Sydney Goodsir Smith. Others demonstrated a greater interest in English language poetry, among them Norman MacCaig, George Bruce and Maurice Lindsay. George Mackay Brown from Orkney, and Iain Crichton Smith from Lewis, wrote both poetry and prose fiction shaped by their distinctive island backgrounds. The Glaswegian poet Edwin Morgan became known for translations of works from a wide range of European languages. He was also the first Scots Makar (the official national poet), appointed by the inaugural Scottish government in 2004. The shift to drama that focused on working class life in the post-war period gained momentum with Robert McLeish's The Gorbals Story and the work of Ena Lamont Stewart, Robert Kemp and George Munro. Many major Scottish post-war novelists, such as Muriel Spark, James Kennaway, Alexander Trocchi, Jessie Kesson and Robin Jenkins spent much or most of their lives outside Scotland, but often dealt with Scottish themes, as in Spark's Edinburgh-set The Prime of Miss Jean Brodie (1961) and Kennaway's script for the film Tunes of Glory (1956). Successful mass-market works included the action novels of Alistair MacLean, and the historical fiction of Dorothy Dunnett. A younger generation of novelists that emerged in the 1960s and 1970s included Shena Mackay, Alan Spence, Allan Massie and the work of William McIlvanney.

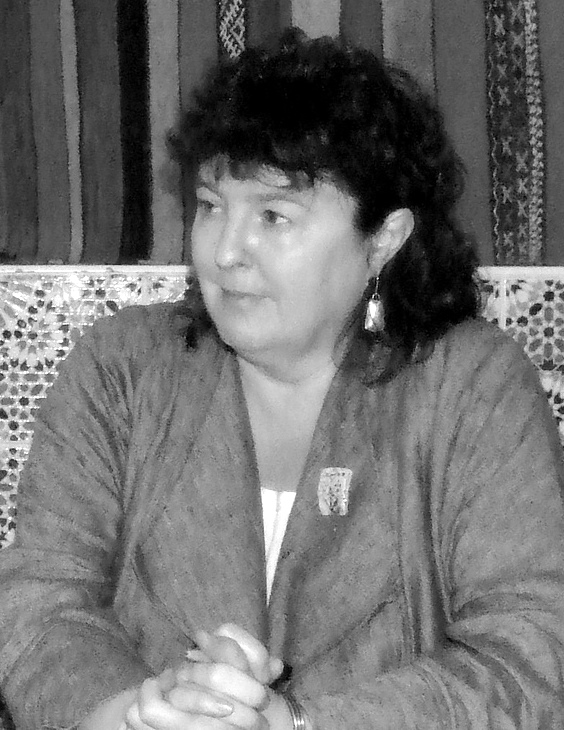
Carol Ann Duffy; the first Scottish, female and openly gay Poet Laureate

During and after the 1980s, Scottish literature enjoyed another major revival; particularly associated with a group of Glasgow writers focused around meetings in the house of critic, poet and teacher Philip Hobsbaum. Also important in the movement was Peter Kravitz, editor of Polygon Books. Members of the group that would come to prominence as writers included James Kelman, Alasdair Gray, Liz Lochhead, Tom Leonard and Aonghas MacNeacail. In the 1990s, many major and prize-winning Scottish novels that emerged from this movement included Gray's Poor Things (1992), Irvine Welsh's Trainspotting (1993), Kelman's How Late It Was, How Late (1994) and Warner's Morvern Callar (1995). These works were linked by a sometimes overtly political reaction to Thatcherism that explored marginal areas of experience and used vivid vernacular language; often including expletives and Scots. Gray and Iain Banks led a wave of fantasy, speculative and science-fiction writing with notable authors including Ken MacLeod, Andrew Crumey, Michel Faber, Alice Thompson and Frank Kuppner. Scottish crime fiction has been a major area of growth with the success of novelists including Val McDermid, Frederic Lindsay, Christopher Brookmyre, Quintin Jardine, Denise Mina; and particularly the success of Fife's Ian Rankin and his Edinburgh-set Inspector Rebus novels. Scottish play writing became increasingly internationalised, with Scottish writers such as Liz Lochhead and Edwin Morgan adapting classic texts, while Jo Clifford and David Greig investigated European themes. This period also saw the emergence of a new generation of Scottish poets that became leading figures on the UK stage, including Don Paterson, Kathleen Jamie, Douglas Dunn, Robert Crawford, and Carol Ann Duffy. Glasgow-born Duffy was named as Poet Laureate of the United Kingdom in May 2009, the first woman, the first Scot and the first openly gay poet to be appointed to the post.

== See also ==
- Association for Scottish Literary Studies
- International Association for the Study of Scottish Literatures
- List of books for the "Famous Scots Series"
- Golden Treasury of Scottish Poetry
- History of the Scots language
- Literature in the other languages of Britain
- Modern Scottish Poetry (Faber)
- English literature
- G. Ross Roy founding editor of the journal Studies in Scottish Literature
