= Ninian =

5th-century bishop, missionary, and saint

Saint Ninian
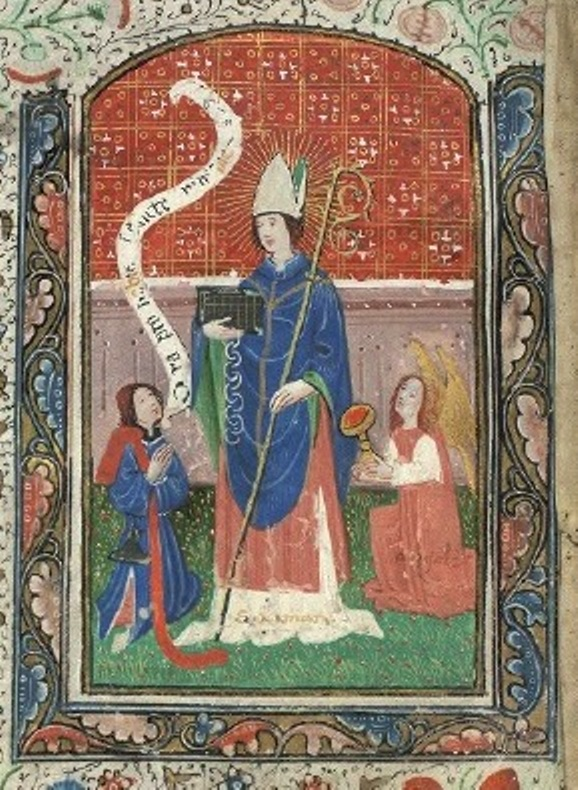
- Saint Ninian as intercessor ("Ora pro nobis, Sancte Niniane"). Donor portrait in the Book of Hours of the Virgin and Saint Ninian, 15th century

Apostle to the Southern Picts
- Died: AD 432
- Venerated in: Catholicism; Eastern Orthodoxy; Anglican Communion
- Major shrine: Whithorn Priory
- Feast: 16 September
- Attributes: Episcopal, Bell of St Ninian

Ninian is a Christian saint, first mentioned in the 8th century as being an early missionary among the Pictish peoples of what is now Scotland. For this reason, he is known as the Apostle to the Southern Picts, and there are numerous dedications to him in those parts of Scotland with a Pictish heritage, throughout the Scottish Lowlands and Northern England which were formerly in the old kingdom of Northumbria of the time. He is also known as Ringan in parts of Scotland, and as Trynnian in Northern England.

Ninian's major shrine was at Whithorn in Galloway, where he is associated with the Candida Casa (Latin for 'White House'). Nothing is known about his teachings, and there is no unchallenged authority for information about his life.

Ninian's identity is uncertain, and historians have identified the name "Ninian" with other historical figures. A popular hypothesis proposed by Thomas Owen Clancy, a researcher and professor of Celtic studies, posits that Ninian can be identified with three other historical figures: Saint Finnian of Movilla, Saint Finnian of Clonard, and Saint Finbarr of Cork. Linguistic variations across the territories associated with each saint have provided evidence that the Ninian preserved in literary tradition originated from this individual. This article discusses the particulars and origins of what has come to be known as the "traditional" stories of Saint Ninian.

== Background ==
The Southern Picts, for whom Ninian is held to be the apostle, were the Picts south of the mountains known as the Mounth, which cross Scotland north of the Firths of Clyde and Forth. In the 4th century, the southern boundaries of their territory were with British kingdoms.

In his Letter to Coroticus, Saint Patrick mentions 'apostate Picts'. Patrick is generally considered to be a 5th century individual and Ninian is conventionally taken to have been 4th/5th century.

By 681, the southern Picts were firmly Christian and Northumbria established a bishopric at Abercorn, under Bishop Trumwine. This effort was abandoned shortly after the Picts defeated the Northumbrians at the Battle of Dun Nechtain in 685.

Christianity was present in Galloway by the 5th century and continued into the 6th century. By the time of Bede's account in 731, the Northumbrians had enjoyed an unbroken relationship with Galloway for a century or longer, beginning with the Northumbrian predecessor state of Bernicia. The full nature of the relationship is uncertain. Also at this time, Northumbria was establishing bishoprics in its sphere of influence, to be subordinate to the Northumbrian Archbishop of York. One such bishopric was established at Whithorn in 731, and Bede's account serves to support the legitimacy of the new Northumbrian bishopric. The Bernician name hwit ærn is Old English for the Latin candida casa, or 'white house' in modern English, and it has survived as the modern name of Whithorn.

There is as yet no unchallenged connection of the historical record to the person who was Bede's Ninian. However, the unlikelihood that the reputable historian Bede invented Ninian without some basis in the historical record, combined with an increased knowledge of Ireland's early saints and Whithorn's early Christian connections, has led to serious scholarly efforts to find Bede's basis. James Henthorn Todd, in his 1855 publication of the Leabhar Imuinn (The Book of Hymns of the Ancient Church of Ireland), suggested that it was Finnian of Moville, and that view has gained traction among modern scholars.

== Traditional story ==
The earliest mention of Ninian of Whithorn is in a short passage of The Ecclesiastical History of the English People by the Northumbrian monk Bede in c. 731. The 8th-century poem Miracula Nyniae Episcopi records some of the miracles attributed to him. A Life of Saint Ninian (Vita Sancti Niniani) was written around 1160 by Ailred of Rievaulx, and in 1639 James Ussher discusses Ninian in his Brittanicarum Ecclesiarum Antiquitates. These are the sources of information about Ninian of Whithorn, and all provide seemingly innocuous personal details about his life. However, there is no unchallenged historical evidence to support any of their stories, and all sources had political and religious agendas that were served by their accounts of Saint Ninian (discussed below).

Tradition holds that Ninian was a Briton who had studied in Rome, that he established an episcopal see at the Candida Casa in Whithorn, that he named the see for Saint Martin of Tours, that he converted the southern Picts to Christianity, and that he is buried at Whithorn. Variations of the story add that he had actually met St Martin, that his father was a Christian king, and that he was buried in a stone sarcophagus near the altar of his church. Further variations assert that he left for Ireland, and died there in 432. Dates for his birth are derived from the traditional mention of St Martin, who died in 397.

=== Bede (c. 731) ===
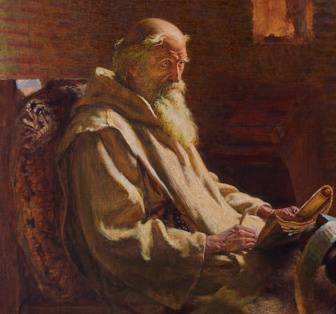
The Venerable Bede translates John, by J. D. Penrose, c. 1902.

Bede says that Ninian (whose name he only renders in the ablative case Nynia) was a Briton who had been instructed in Rome; that he made his church of stone, which was unusual among the Britons; that his episcopal see was named after Saint Martin of Tours; that he preached to and converted the southern Picts; that his base was called Ad Candidam Casam, which was in the province of the Bernicians; and that he was buried there, along with many other saints.

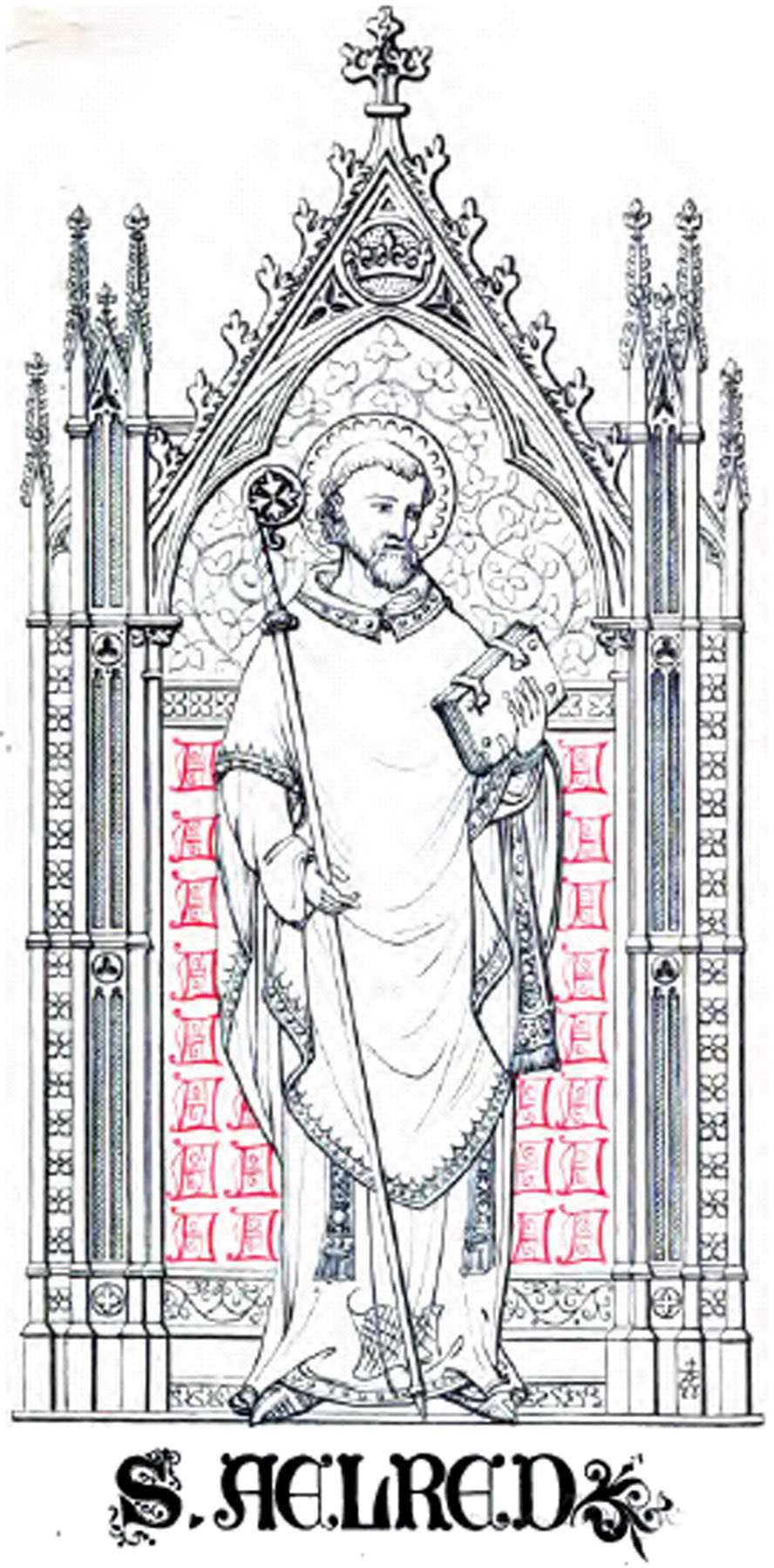
Saint Ailred (or Aelred), from an 1845 book.

=== Aelred (c. 1160) ===
Leaving aside the stories regarding miracles, in the Vita Sancti Niniani Aelred includes the following incidental information regarding Saint Ninian: that his father was a Christian king; that he was consecrated a bishop in Rome and that he met Saint Martin in Tours; that Saint Martin sent masons with him on his homeward journey, at his request; that these masons built a church of stone, situated on the shore, and that on learning of Saint Martin's death, Ninian dedicated the church to him; that a certain rich and powerful "King Tuduvallus" was converted by him; that he died after having converted the Picts and returned home, being buried in a stone sarcophagus near the altar of his church; and that he had once travelled with his brother, named "Plebia".

Aelred said that in addition to finding information about Ninian in Bede, he took much additional information for his Life of S. Ninian from a source written in a "barbarous language"; there is no further information about this text. Aelred wrote his Life of S. Ninian sometime after spending ten years at the Scottish court and thus had close connections both to the Scottish royal family and to Fergus of Galloway (who would resurrect the Bishopric of Galloway), all of whom would have been pleased to have a manuscript with such a glowing description of a Galwegian and Scottish saint. His work is what Thomas Heffernan refers to as a "sacred biography", probably intended for a politically ambitious audience.

=== Ussher (1639) ===
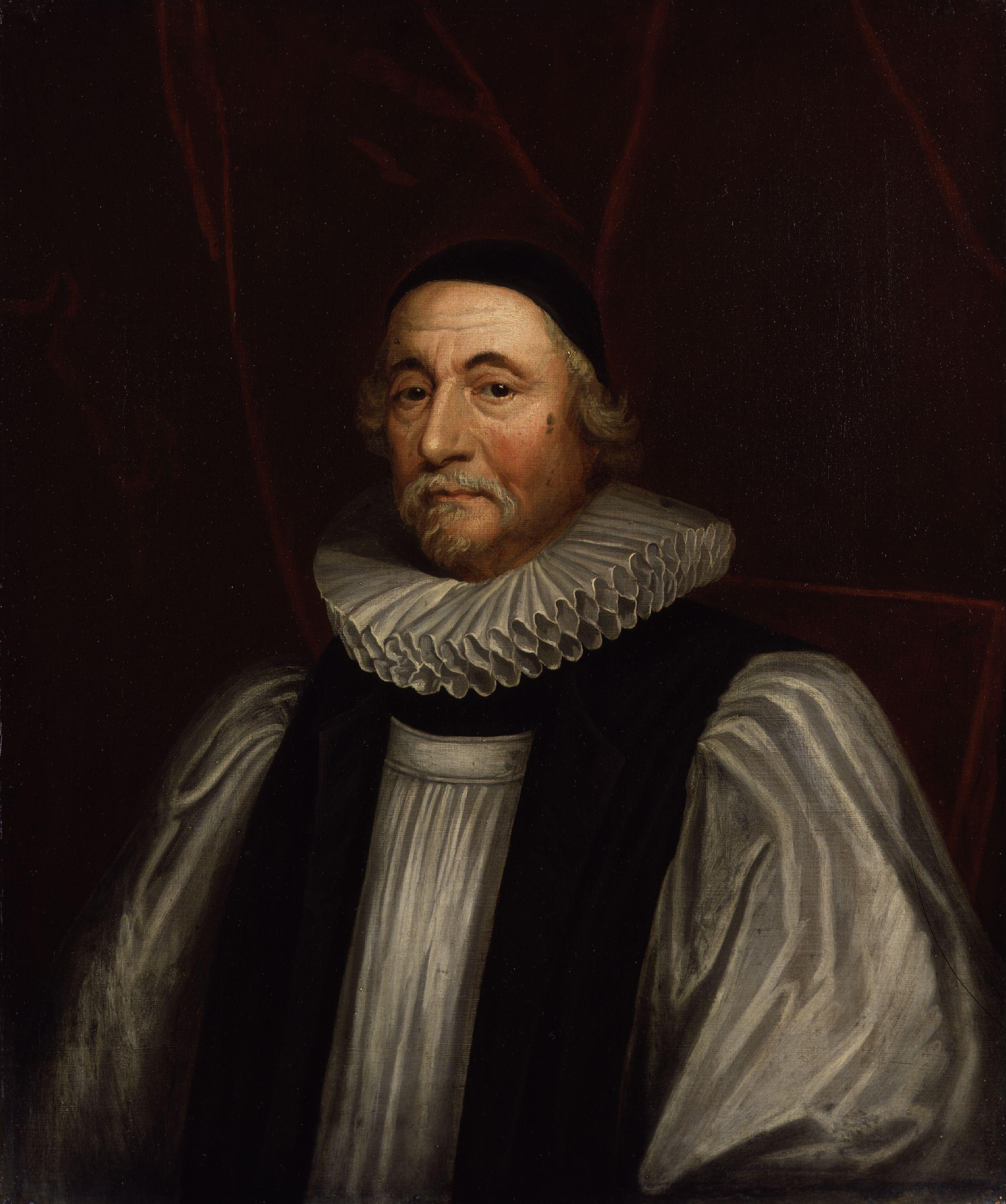
James Ussher, Archbishop of Armagh, Primate of All Ireland.

James Ussher wrote that Ninian left Candida Casa for Cluayn-coner in Ireland, and eventually died in Ireland; that his mother was a Spanish princess; that his father wished to regain him after having assented to his training for an ecclesiastical state; that a bell comes from heaven to call together his disciples; that a wooden church was raised by him, with beams delivered by stags; and that a harper with no experience at architecture was the builder of the church. He adds that a smith and his son, named respectively "Terna" and "Wyn", witnessed a miracle by Ninian and that the saint was granted lands to be called "Wytterna".

In addition, Skene attributes the "traditional" date of Ninian's death (16 September 432) ultimately to Ussher's Life of Ninian, noting that the date is "without authority".

Ussher's contribution is often disparaged, as he both invented fictitious histories and misquoted legitimate manuscripts to suit his own purposes. Still, he had access to legitimate manuscripts, and he has contributed to some versions of the traditional stories.

=== Other sources ===
Others who wrote of Saint Ninian used the accounts of Bede, Aelred, or Ussher, or used derivatives of them in combination with information from various manuscripts. This includes John Capgrave (1393–1464), John of Tinmouth (fl. c. 1366), John Colgan (died c. 1657), and many others, up to the present day.

The anonymously written 8th-century hagiographic Miracula Nynie Episcopi (Miracles of Bishop Ninian) is discounted as a non-historical account, and copies are not widely extant.

== Dedications to St Ninian ==
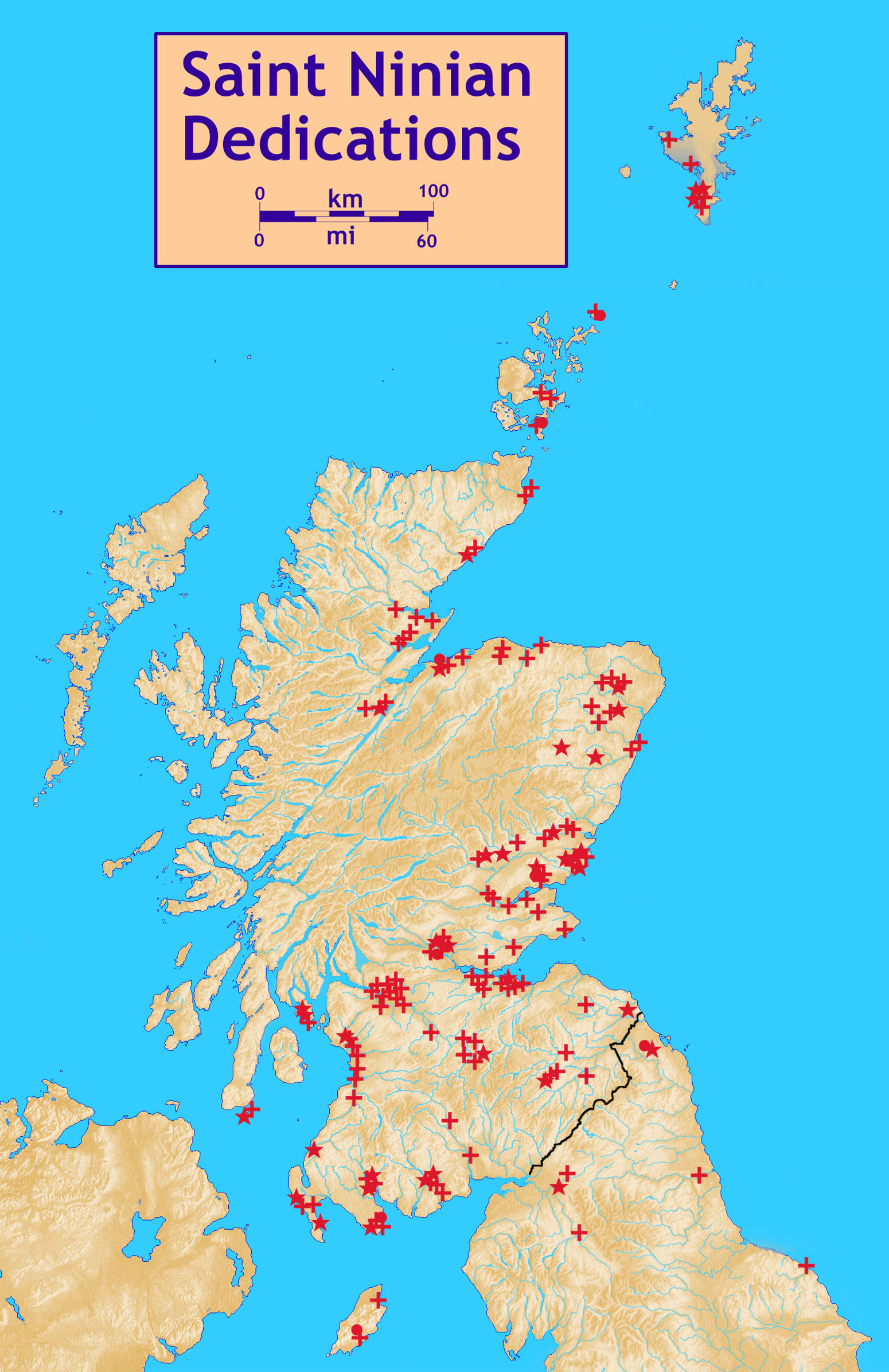
Dedications to St Ninian (England, Scotland, Isle of Man).

Dedications to Saint Ninian are expressions of respect for the good works that are attributed to him, and the authenticity of the stories about him are not relevant to that point. Almost all of the dedications have their origins in the medieval era, after Aelred wrote his account.

The dedications are found throughout the lands of the ancient Picts of Scotland, throughout Scotland south of the Firths of Clyde and Forth, in Orkney and Shetland, and in parts of northern England.

Dedications on the Isle of Man date from the time of medieval Scottish dominance, and are not natively inspired.

There are dedications to Ninian in East Donegal including the Parish Church in Convoy, and also in Belfast; and a spot formerly on the shore of Belfast Lough was traditionally known as St Ninian's Point, where the missionary reputedly landed after a voyage from Scotland. These connections reflect a strong Ulster-Scots heritage in both areas of Ulster.

There are also dedications elsewhere in the world where there is a Scottish heritage, such as Nova Scotia. St Ninian's Cathedral is located in Antigonish, Nova Scotia.

There is a noticeable lack of dedications in the Scottish Highlands and Isles, save for Kilninian and the Holy Spring of St Ninian of the Orthodox Mull Monastery on the Isle of Mull.

In the modern era, the first cathedral built in Scotland after the Protestant Reformation, St Ninian's Cathedral, Perth, was dedicated to the saint in 1850. St Ninian and Triduana's Church, Edinburgh is a Roman Catholic church constructed in 1932 that is dedicated to Ninian. St Martin and St Ninian is a Catholic church in Whithorn, constructed in 1959–60 in the Roman Catholic Diocese of Galloway. The architect was Harry Stuart Goodhart-Rendel (1887–1959).

In Scotland the date 16 September is celebrated as St Ninian's Feast Day. Ninian is honoured in the Church of England and in the Episcopal Church on 16 September.

== Gallery ==
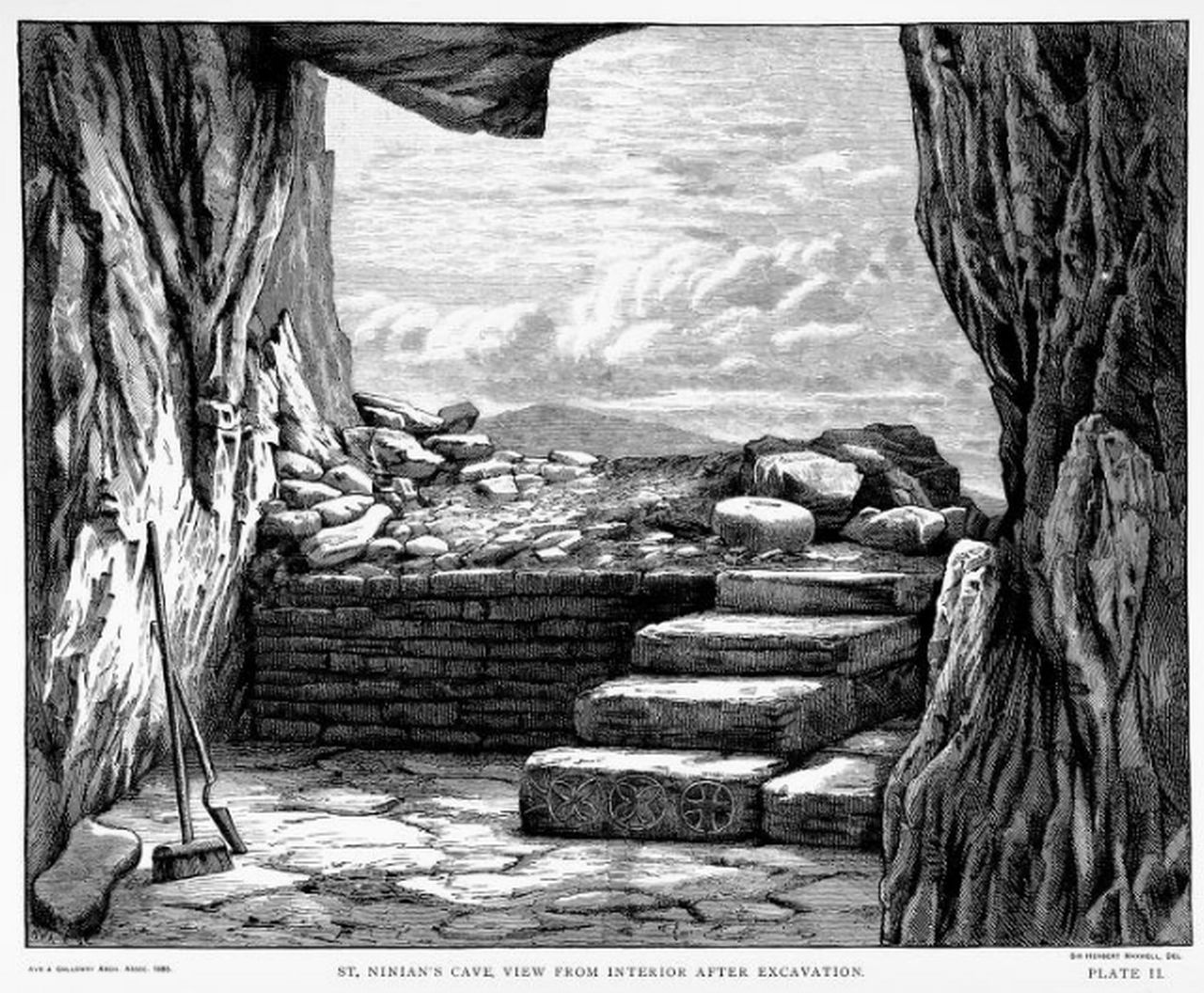
St Ninian's Cave, Glasserton, Wigtownshire by Sir Herbert Maxwell. 1885

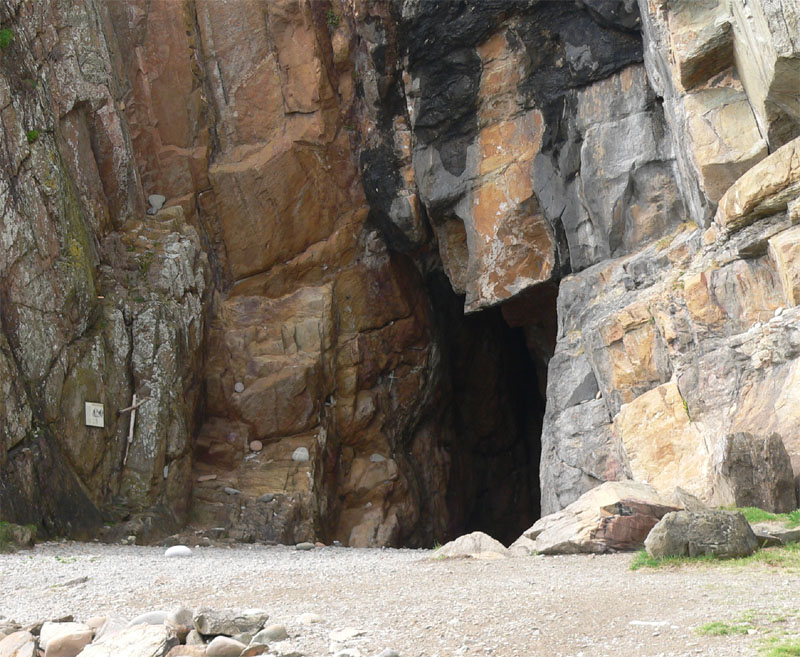
Entrance to St Ninian's Cave

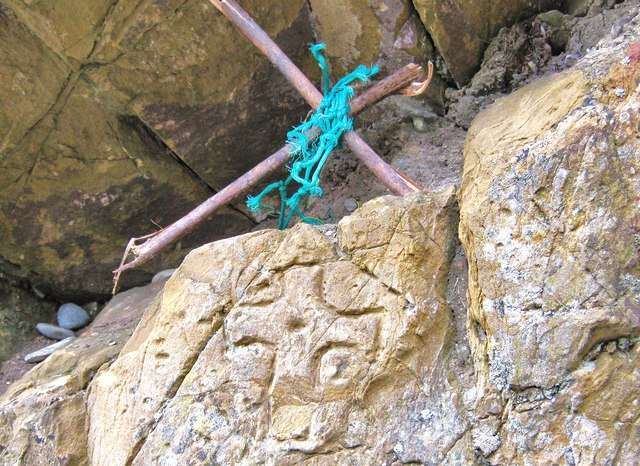
Votives at St Ninian's Cave entrance

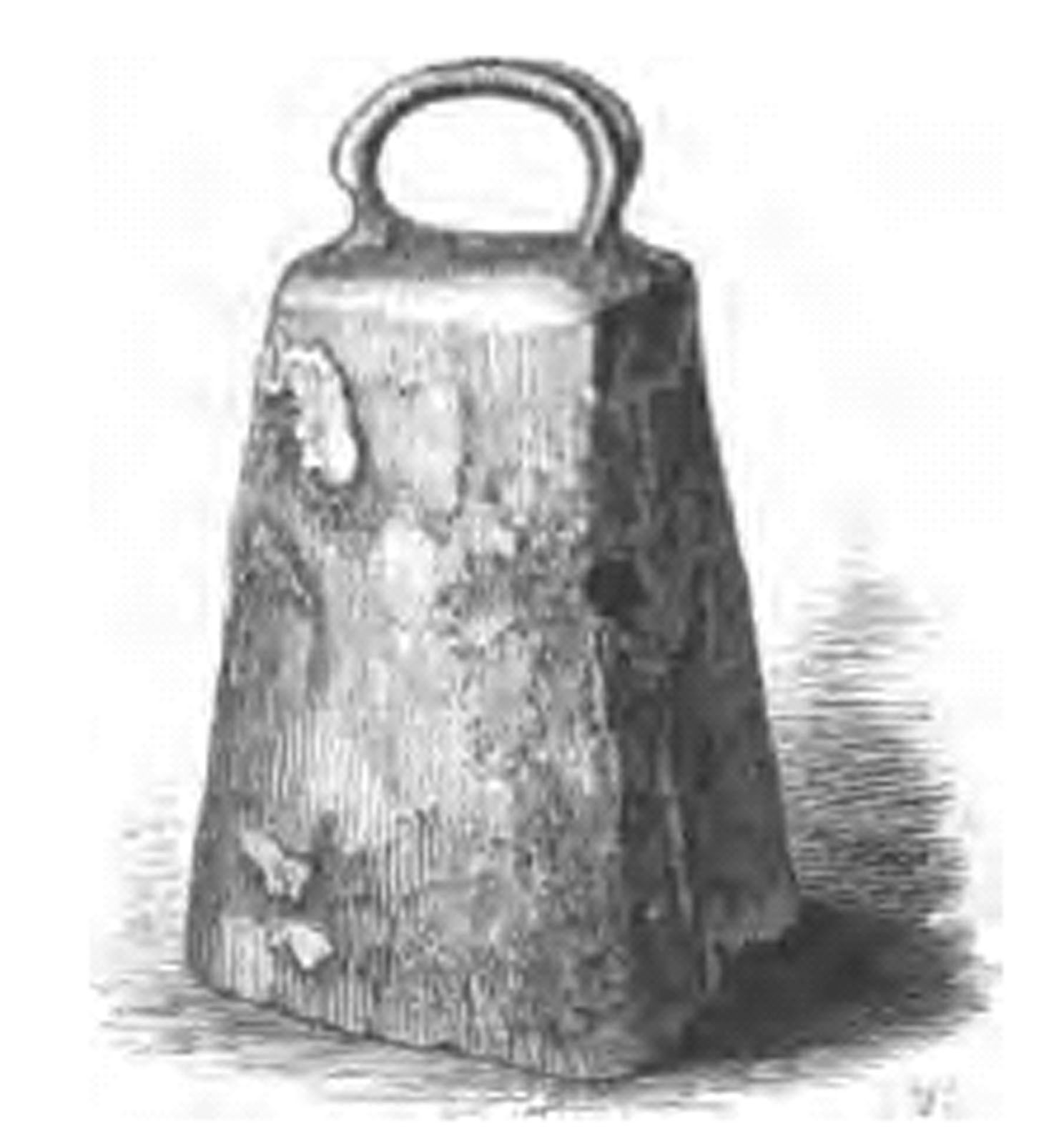
The Clog-rinny, or Bell of St Ninian

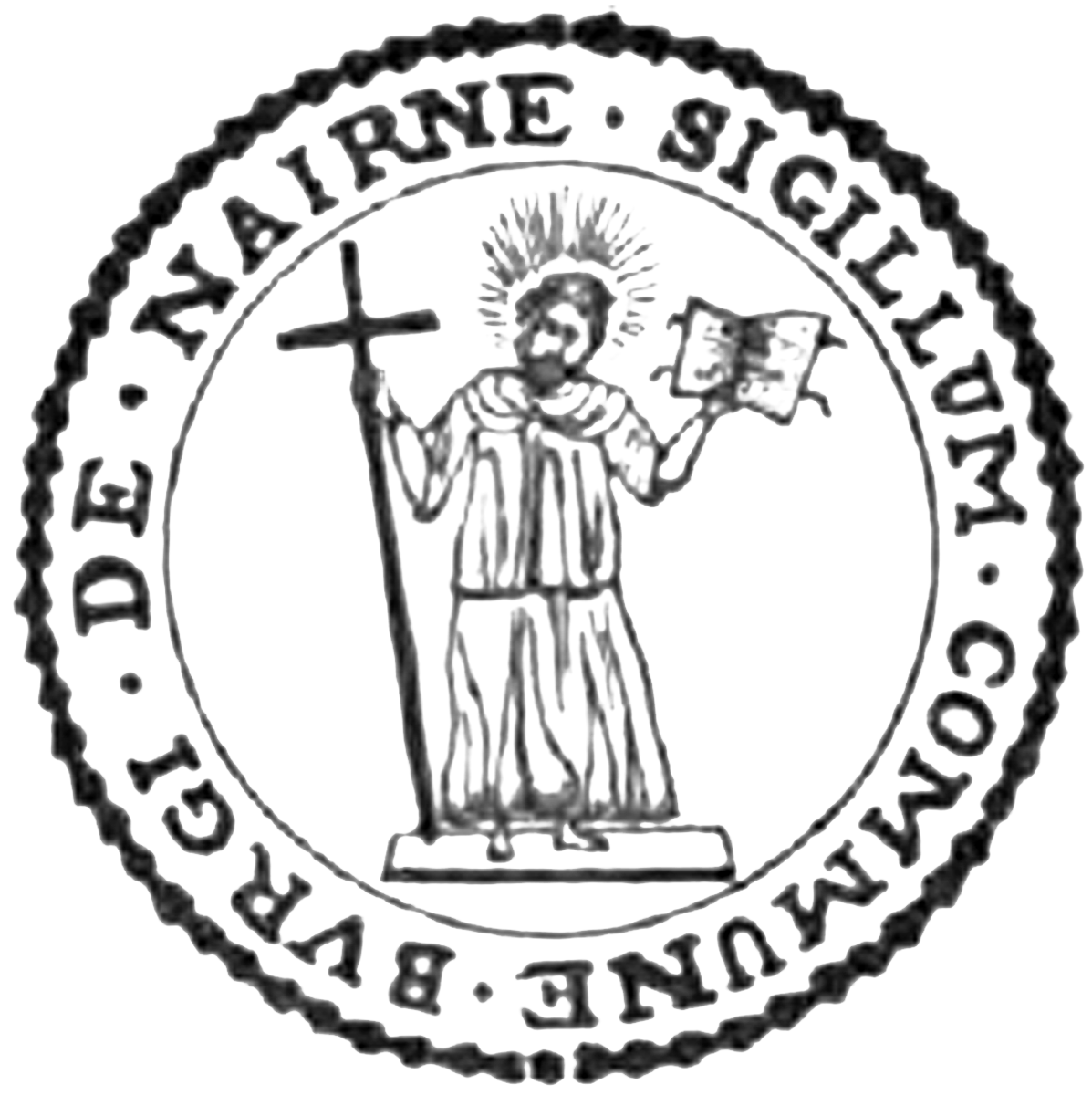
Burgh of Nairn seal, depicting St Ninian (1906).

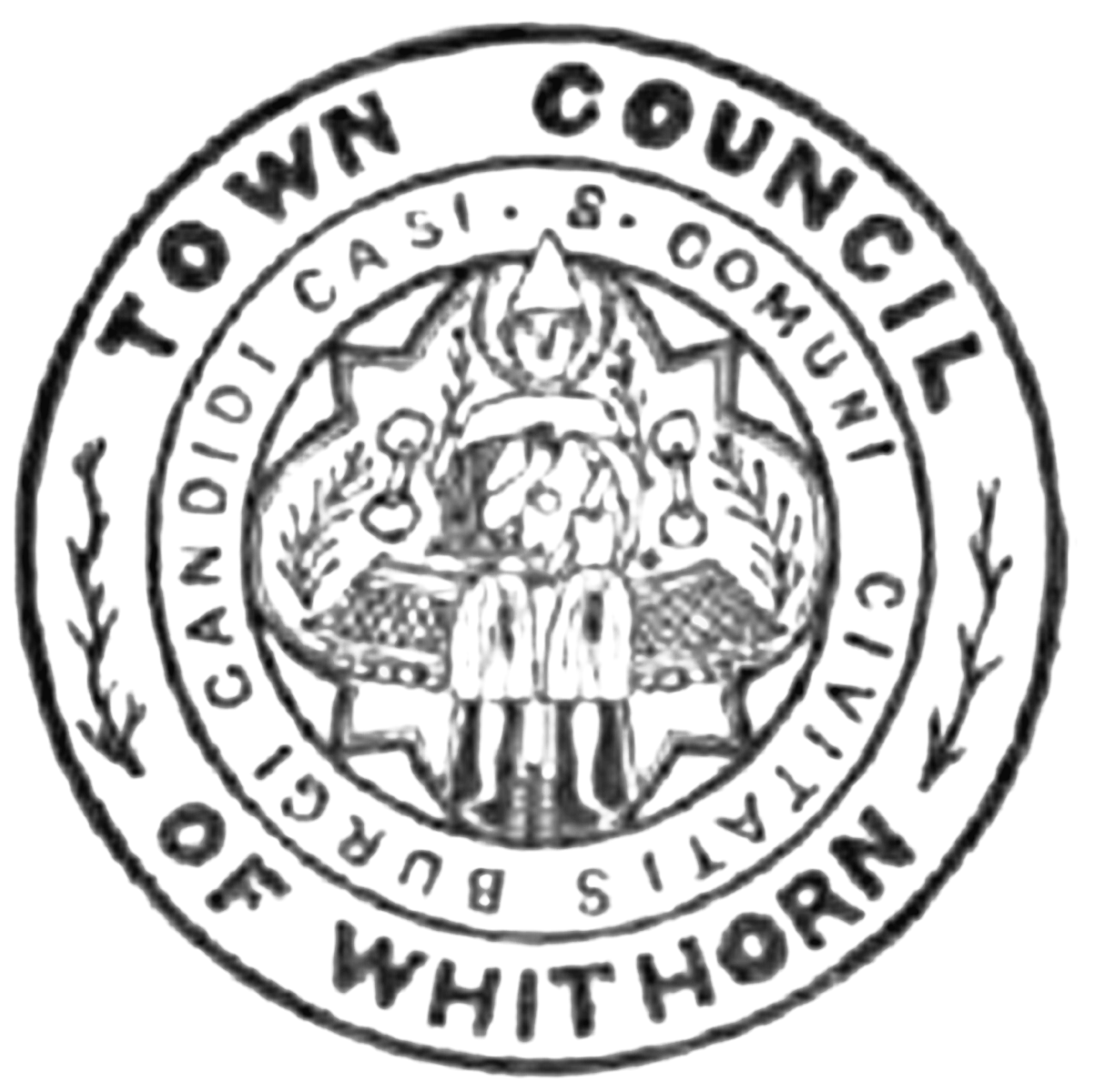
Burgh of Whithorn seal, depicting St Ninian (1906)

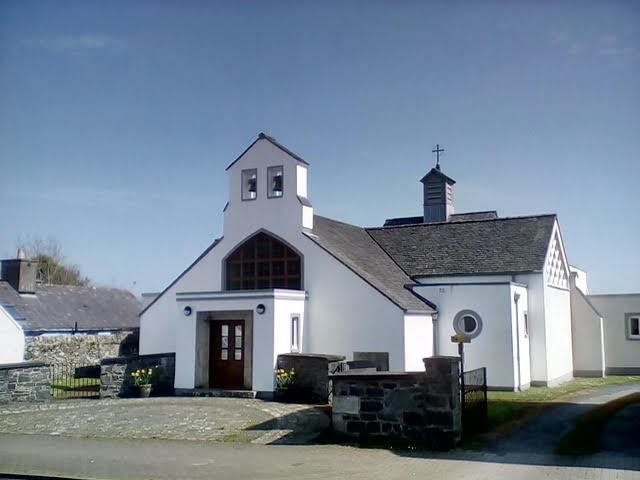
St Martin and St Ninian Catholic Church in Whithorn

== See also ==
- Isle of Whithorn
- St Ninian's Isle
- St Ninian's Well
- Vita Sancti Niniani ("Life of Saint Ninian")

== Bibliography ==
- Bede (731), Giles, J. A. (ed.), The Miscellaneous Works of Venerable Bede, vol. II, London: Whittaker and Co.
- Dowden, John (1894), "The Life of St. Ninian", The Celtic Church in Scotland, London: Society for Promoting Christian Knowledge, pp. 23–32
- Forbes, Alexander Penrose (1874), The Historians of Scotland: The Lives of S. Ninian and S. Kentigern, vol. V, Edinburgh: Edmonston and Douglas
- Hardy, Thomas Duffus (1862), Descriptive Catalogue of Materials Relating to the History of Great Britain and Ireland, vol. I, London: Longman, green, Longman, and Roberts — many references to, and comments upon, sources of information
- Healy, John (1908), Insula Sanctorum Et Doctorum (Ireland's Ancient Schools and Scholars) (5th ed.), Dublin: Sealy, Bryers & Walker
- Lanigan, John (1822), An Ecclesiastical History of Ireland, vol. I, Dublin
- Mackinlay, James Murray (1904), Influence of the Pre-Reformation Church on Scottish Place-Names, Edinburgh: William Blackwood and Sons
- Moore, Arthur William (1890), The Surnames and Place-names of the Isle of Man, London: Elliot Stock
- Newman, John Henry; Hutton, Arthur Wollaston (1845), Lives of the English Saints: St. Aelred, Abbot of Rievaulx, London: James Toovey
- Scott, Archibald Black (July 1905), "Nynia in Northern Pictland", The Scottish Historical Review, II (8), Glasgow: James Maclehose and Sons: 378–388, JSTOR 25517649
- Skene, William Forbes (1887), Celtic Scotland: A History of Ancient Alban, vol. II (2nd ed.), Edinburgh: David Douglas
- Ussher, James (1639), "Britannicarum Ecclesiarum Antiquitates", The Whole Works of the Most Reverend James Ussher, D.D., vol. VI, Dublin
