= Nikki Hessell =

New Zealand literary scholar

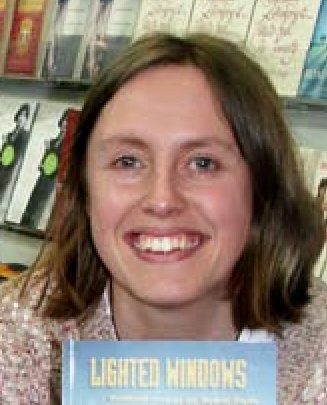
- Hessell in 2008
- Awards: Jack Prize

Academic background
- Education: Victoria University of Wellington, University of Toronto
- Theses: Invention and re-invention: the composition of Mary Robinson's Lyrical tales (1800) (2000); Coleridge as journalist 1799-1800. (2003)

Nicola Anne Hessell is a New Zealand academic, and is a full professor at Victoria University of Wellington, specialising in British Romantic literature, and the intersection between Romantic literature and indigeneity.

== Academic career ==
Hessell completed a master's degree at Victoria University of Wellington in 2000, with a thesis titled Invention and re-invention: the composition of Mary Robinson's Lyrical tales (1800). She followed this with a PhD titled Coleridge as journalist 1799–1800 at the University of Toronto. Hessell then joined the faculty of the Victoria University of Wellington, rising to full professor in 2022, where she is part of the New Zealand India Research Institute.

Hessell's main research interest is in the intersection between Indigeneity and Romanticism, but she is also interested in the relationship between journalism and writing, and the history of British print culture. Hessell has been awarded two Marsden grants, including the 2018 grant "Sensitive Negotiations: Indigenous Diplomacy and British Romantic Poetry". She has published three books, and an edited a collection of journalist Robin Hyde's parliamentary reports.

In 2022 Hessell was awarded a Peterson Fellowship to conduct research on the use of poetry in Indigenous diplomacy using the American Antiquarian Society's collection of Native American writing.

== Awards and honours ==
In 2017 Hessell won the North American Society for the Study of Romanticism's Romantic Circles Pedagogy Contest, for her fourth-year course "Romanticism and Indigeneity".

Alongside co-author Stephen Clothier, Hessell won the International Association for the Study of Scottish Literatures' inaugural Jack Medal in 2018. The prize is awarded annually for the best newly published academic article on a subject dealing with Scottish literature and related to reception and/or diaspora, and Hessell and Clothier won for the article To Mary in Aotearoa: Burns’s ‘Thou Ling’ring Star’ and Scottish Identity in New Zealand. The judges commented that "Hessell and Clothier's consideration of Robert Burns's reception in New Zealand opens up important discussions about diaspora, indigeneity, and literary interpretation in Scottish studies".

== Selected works ==
=== Books ===
- Hessell, Nikki (2018). Romantic Literature and the Colonised World. Palgrave Studies in the Enlightenment, Romanticism and Cultures of Print. Palgrave Macmillan Cham. doi:10.1007/978-3-319-70933-8. ISBN 978-3-319-70932-1. ISSN 2634-6516.
- Hessell, Nikki (5 November 2011). Literary Authors, Parliamentary Reporters. Cambridge University Press. doi:10.1017/cbo9781139004954. ISBN 978-1-107-01357-5.
- Hessell, Nikki (2021). Sensitive Negotiations: Indigenous Diplomacy and British Romantic Poetry. SUNY series, Studies in the Long Nineteenth Century. SUNY, ISBN 9781438484778

=== Book chapters and scholarly articles ===
- Elizabeth Potter; Hessell, Nicola Anne (2022). "Re-Indigenizing Romanticism: A Forum". Studies in Romanticism. 61 (4): 481–489. doi:10.1353/srm.2022.0039. Wikidata Q124215482.
- Hessell, Nicola Anne (2021). "Mokena and Macaulay: Cultural geographies of poetry in colonial Aotearoa". doi:10.7765/9781526152893.00025. Wikidata Q124215486 http://dx.doi.org/10.7765/9781526152893.00025.
- Hessell, Nicola Anne (2022). "Keats and Brown Reading". European Romantic Review. 33 (2): 213–228. doi:10.1080/10509585.2022.2043582. Wikidata Q124215487.
- Hessell, Nicola Anne (2019). "Keats and the Poetics of Climate Change, 1816 and Beyond". pp. 59–74. doi:10.1007/978-3-030-16241-2_4. Wikidata Q124215559 http://dx.doi.org/10.1007/978-3-030-16241-2_4.
- Hessell, Nicola Anne (2019). "Facing Empire: Indigenous Experiences in a Revolutionary Age". Journal of New Zealand Studies (NS29). doi:10.26686/jnzs.v0ins29.6275. Wikidata Q124215558.
- Hessell, Nicola Anne (2020). "The Indigenous Lyrical Ballads". pp. 253–268. doi:10.1017/9781108236300.021. Wikidata Q124215557 http://dx.doi.org/10.1017/9781108236300.021.
- Hessell, Nicola Anne (2020). "Truth and Reconciliation in Eighteenth-Century Literature: The Case of the "Monster Brandt"". Eighteenth-Century Fiction. 33 (1): 1–23. doi:10.3138/ecf.33.1.1. Wikidata Q124215556.
- Hessell, Nikki; Clothier, Stephen (2017). "To Mary in Aotearoa: Burns's 'Thou Ling'ring Star' and Scottish Identity in New Zealand". Scottish Literary Review. 9 (2): 41–56. ISSN 2050-6678.
