= G. Ross Roy =

Canadian scholar

George Ross Roy (20 April 1924 – 19 February 2013) was a Canadian scholar who specialized in Scottish literature, best known as editor of the long-standard edition of The Letters of Robert Burns, 2 vols. (1985), as a collector of Burns books and manuscripts, and as founder and for nearly 50 years sole editor of the journal Studies in Scottish Literature, the first refereed academic journal in the field.

== Early life and education ==
He was born in Montreal, Quebec, of Scottish descent, with ancestors who had fought on the losing side at the Battle of Culloden (1746) and the winning side at the Battle of the Plains of Abraham (1759). He started college to study botany, but when World War II interrupted his studies, he was commissioned as a navigator in the Royal Canadian Air Force, serving with the RAF from bases in Britain, Africa, and India. He subsequently switched interests to literature, earned his BA from Sir George Williams University (now Concordia University) (1950), his maitrisse from the University of Strasbourg (1954), an MA and PhD from the University of Montreal (1951, 1959), and a DUniv from the Sorbonne (1958). He was also awarded honorary DLitts by the University of Edinburgh (2002) and the University of Glasgow (2009).

== Career ==
Following his marriage in 1954 to Lucie Jehl (1925–2019) of Strasbourg, he taught at the Royal Military College of Canada, the University of Alabama, the University of Montreal, and Texas Tech University, before moving in 1965 to the University of South Carolina as professor of English and comparative literature, retiring there as emeritus in 1990. He was visiting professor at the University of Metz in 1991–92, and honorary professor in the Centre for Robert Burns Studies, at the University of Glasgow, from 2008 until his death.

=== Burns scholarship ===
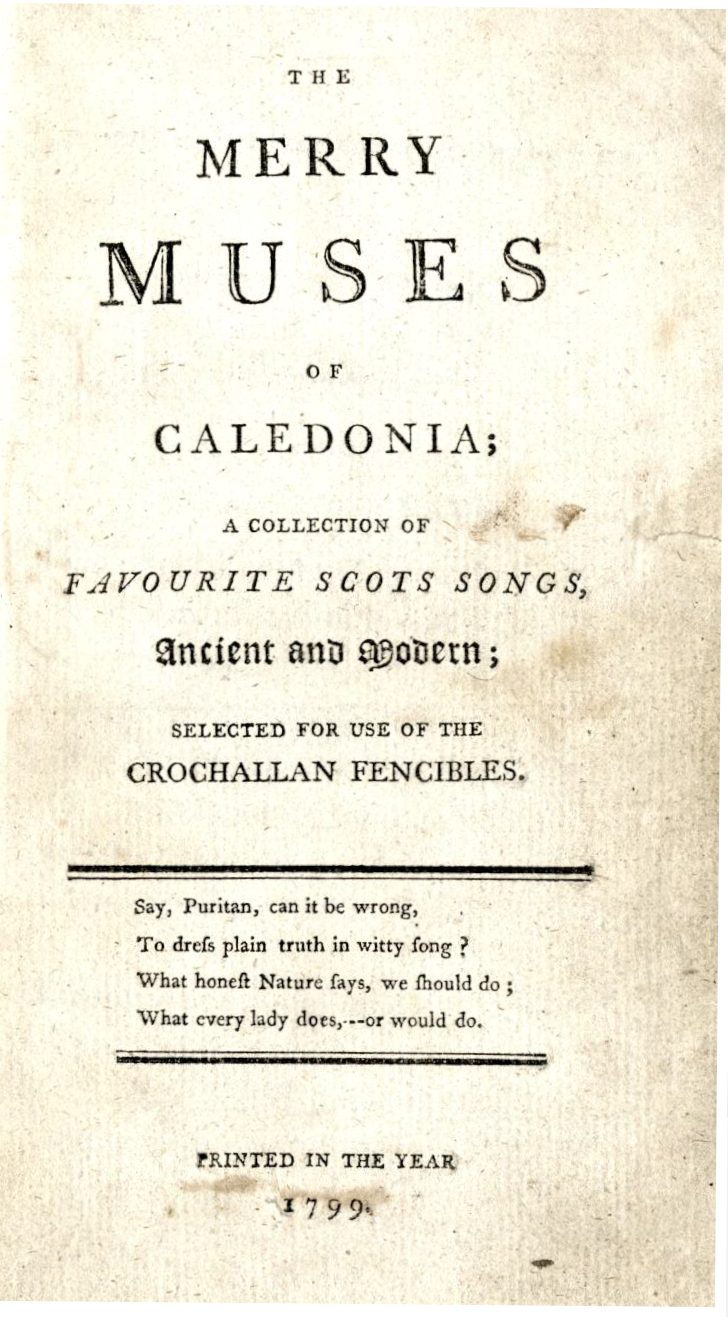
Merry Muses of Caledonia (1799) from the G. Ross Roy Collection

As a boy, Ross had visited Scotland and been introduced to the writings of the Scottish poet Robert Burns (1759-1796) by his grandfather, W. Ormiston Roy, an avid Burns and Whitman collector. When in college he lived with his grandfather and further developed his literary interests. Ross Roy's early scholarship was in comparative literature, on the French reception of Walt Whitman, and his first books were on Canadian poetry. His first published articles on Burns concerned the French reception and translation of Burns's poetry, but from the mid-1960s onwards, aside from his editorial work, almost all his scholarship related to Burns. His major achievement, over twenty-five years in the making, was a full revision of the collected Letters of Robert Burns, published by Clarendon Press in 1985, which recollated previously known letters against manuscript, expanded some letters that had previously been published in incomplete texts, and added some thirty additional letters. A second notable contribution was his full description and dating in 1965 of the first edition of Burns's collection The Merry Muses of Caledonia (1799), and his editing of the first facsimile of the 1799 edition for the University of South Carolina Press in 1999. A volume of his selected essays about Burns was published in 2018, and a full list of his publications was included in the festschrift presented to him in 2012 (a list of addenda through 2015 was included in his Selected Essays, 2018). For his contributions to Burns studies, he was elected in 1987 as an honorary president of the Robert Burns World Federation. He was also elected an honorary member (only the third since 1896) of the Burns Club of Atlanta.

=== Burns collection ===
As an undergraduate in the late 1940s, Ross Roy had helped his grandfather acquire books for his Robert Burns collection, and on his grandfather's death in 1959, he inherited the collection, then comprising some 1500 volumes. Selling his own Canadian literature collection, buying a copy of the most costly Burns volume (the Kilmarnock edition), and aggressively pursuing manuscripts and books on both sides of the Atlantic, he built a collection encompassing Scottish poetry since 1707 that by 1989 totaled some 15000 volumes, with over 5000 volumes of Burns. In 1989, shortly before he was due to retire, he and his wife transferred as gift-purchase the G. Ross Roy Collection to the University of South Carolina Libraries, and he made additional transfers and donations each year thereafter, most notably a collection of Burns manuscripts in 2007. An illustrated catalogue of the Burns portion of the collection was published for the Burns 250th anniversary in 2009. By 2008, it was being referred to as "the largest collection of Scottish poetry outside Scotland."

=== Studies in Scottish Literature ===
When Ross Roy first became interested in Scottish literature, there was no refereed scholarly journal specific to the field. In 1962, he decided to start one himself, and the first number of Studies in Scottish Literature appeared in July 1963. The journal, he wrote, was to provide "a common meeting ground for work embracing all aspects of the great Scottish literary heritage. It is not the organ of any school or faction; it welcomes all shades of opinion.... As a journal devoted to a vigorous living literature it will carry studies of contemporary authors." He planned it as an international venture, recruiting for its first advisory board three major figures, the Scottish poet Hugh MacDiarmid, the veteran American scholar A.L. Strout, and the German scholar Kurt Wittig, soon to be joined by the leading Scottish critic David Daiches. Over the next five decades, first as a quarterly, and then from 1978 as an annual volume, it published not only essays by established scholars and critics, but also first or early articles by many of those who later became influential in the field. Several scholars have suggested that the journal made possible the subsequent institutional development of Scottish literature as an academic discipline. Following a spectacular double-volume in 2007, Roy, by then well over 80, announced that the journal would close down, but in 2012 he transferred rights to the University of South Carolina to continue, with an open-access digital version of the backlog volumes. The editorial office continues at South Carolina, but in 2025, beginning with vol. 51.1, publication and production transferred to Edinburgh University Press.

=== Selected works ===
- The City: A Prose Poem (Strasbourg: Imprimerie Regionale, 1956)
- ed., Twelve Modern French-Canadian Poets (Toronto: Ryerson, 1958)
- Le Sentiment de la Nature dans la Poesie Canadienne Anglaise 1867-1918 (Paris: Nizet, 1961)
- ed., Studies in Scottish Literature, 36 vols. (1963-2007)
- ed. Scottish Poetry Reprints, 7 titles (1970-1996)
- ed., The Letters of Robert Burns, revd. ed, 2 vols. (Oxford: Clarendon Press, 1985)
- ed., The Merry Muses of Caledonia (Columbia, SC: Univ. of South Carolina Press, 1999)
- ed., Robert Burns and America (Kirkcaldy: Akros, 2001)
- ed., Letters Addressed to Clarinda, by Robert Burns (Columbia, SC: Univ. of South Carolina Press, 2009)
- Selected Essays on Robert Burns (Columbia, SC: Scottish Literature Series/Univ. of South Carolina Libraries, 2018)

=== Honors and awards ===
- 2003 - Eighteenth-Century Scottish Studies Society's Lifetime Achievement Award.
- 2009 - Order of the Palmetto for services to the State of South Carolina.
- 2010 - Honorary fellowship from the Association for Scottish Literary Studies

== Legacy ==
Since 2010 there has been an annual G. Ross Roy Medal (now Prize) awarded for the best PhD dissertation on a Scottish topic, presented at the Saltire Society's annual Literary Awards in Edinburgh. Also in 2010, a conference room in Hollings Library, University of South Carolina, displaying Burns portraits and memorabilia, was named at the request of the donors as "The Roy-Scott Room": a portrait of Ross Roy by Alasdair Gray was added in 2018. In 2013, the Ayrshire Association of Burns Clubs renamed their annual Burns quiz competition the Ross Roy Memorial Shield.

== Festschrift ==
- Patrick Scott; Kenneth Simpson, eds. (2012). Robert Burns and friends essays by W. Ormiston Roy Fellows presented to G. Ross Roy. Columbia, SC: University of South Carolina Libraries. pp. 162–180. ISBN 9781439270974.
