= International Association for the Study of Scottish Literatures =

The International Association for the Study of Scottish Literatures (IASSL, Scottish Gaelic: Comann Eadar-Nàiseanta airson Sgrùdadh Litreachas na h-Alba; Scots: Warldwide Associat for the Clerk Leir o braid Scotland's Leid and Scrievin) is the official global association aimed at the promotion of Scottish literature in English, Gaelic, Scots, and Latin on the international level. It is registered as a Scottish charity (SC044410).

== World Congress of Scottish Literatures ==
The Association was launched at the First World Congress of Scottish Literatures in Glasgow in 2014, opened by the Education Secretary Michael Russell and the Chancellor Sir Kenneth Calman. The logo was designed by Dr Craig Lamont, now Lecturer in Scottish Studies at the University of Glasgow. Selected Proceedings from the 2014 Congress were edited by Klaus Peter Muller and his colleagues and published in Mainz in 2017 under the title Inspiring Views from 'a' the airts', with a Preface by the founder Murray Pittock. So far, three world congresses have been held, with the fourth planned for Nottingham in 2024:

- University of Glasgow, Glasgow, Scotland, 2–5 July 2014
- Simon Fraser University, Vancouver, Canada, 21–25 June 2017
- Charles University, Prague, Czech Republic, 22–26 June 2022

== Jack Medal ==
In 2018, the Association launched the Jack Medal, named in honour of Professor Ronald Dyce Sadler Jack (1941–2016), a leading expert on Scottish literature and medieval literature who taught at the University of Edinburgh from 1987 to 2004. The medal is awarded every year for the best newly published academic article on a subject dealing with Scottish literature and related to reception and/or diaspora.

Jack Medal Awardees

- 2018: Nikki Hessell, Stephen Clothier
- 2019: Céline Sabiron
- 2020: Anna Fancett
- 2021: Bryony Coombs
- 2022: Nigel Leask, Peadar Ó Muircheartaigh
- 2023: Jamie Reid Baxter

== Convenors ==
- Prof. Murray Pittock, University of Glasgow (2014–2017)
- Prof. Caroline McCracken-Flesher, University of Wyoming (2017–2020)
- Prof. Carla Sassi, University of Verona (2020–2023)
- Prof. Marie-Odile Hedon, Aix-Marseille University (2023–2026)

== See also ==
- Association for Scottish Literary Studies
- Scottish literature
