= Miracula Nyniae Episcopi =

Written 8th-century hagiographic work

The Miracula Nynie Episcopi (English: Miracles of Bishop Ninian) is an anonymously written 8th-century hagiographic work describing miracles attributed to Saint Ninian. It is considered a non-historical work, and copies are not widely extant.

It was used as a reference by Ailred of Rievaulx in composing his Vita Sancti Niniani (English: Life of Saint Ninian) in the 12th century, a document that was used by the politically ambitious Fergus of Galloway in resurrecting the long-defunct Bishopric of Galloway.

== Edition and translations ==
- Strecker, Karl (ed.). "Miracula Nynie Episcopi." In Poetae Latini Aevi Carolini 4.3, ed. Karl Strecker. MGH Antiquitates. Berlin: Weidmann, 1923 (first published: 1883). pp. 943–61. Available online from the Digital MGH.
- MacQueen, Winifred W. (tr.). "Miracula Nynie Episcopi." In St. Nynia, edited by John MacQueen. Revised edition. Edinburgh: Polygon, 1990 (first published: 1961). pp. 88–101. Also published as:
- MacQueen, Winifred W. (tr.). "Miracula Nynie Episcopi." Transactions of the Dumfriesshire and Galloway Natural History and Antiquarian Society 37 (1960). pp. 21–57
- Márkus, Gilbert (tr.). "The Miracles of St Nynia the Bishop (c. 780?)." In The Triumph Tree: Scotland’s Earliest Poetry, 550–1350, edited by Thomas Owen Clancy. Edinburgh: Canongate, 1998. pp. 126–39.
