= Murray Pittock =

Scottish historian (born 1962)

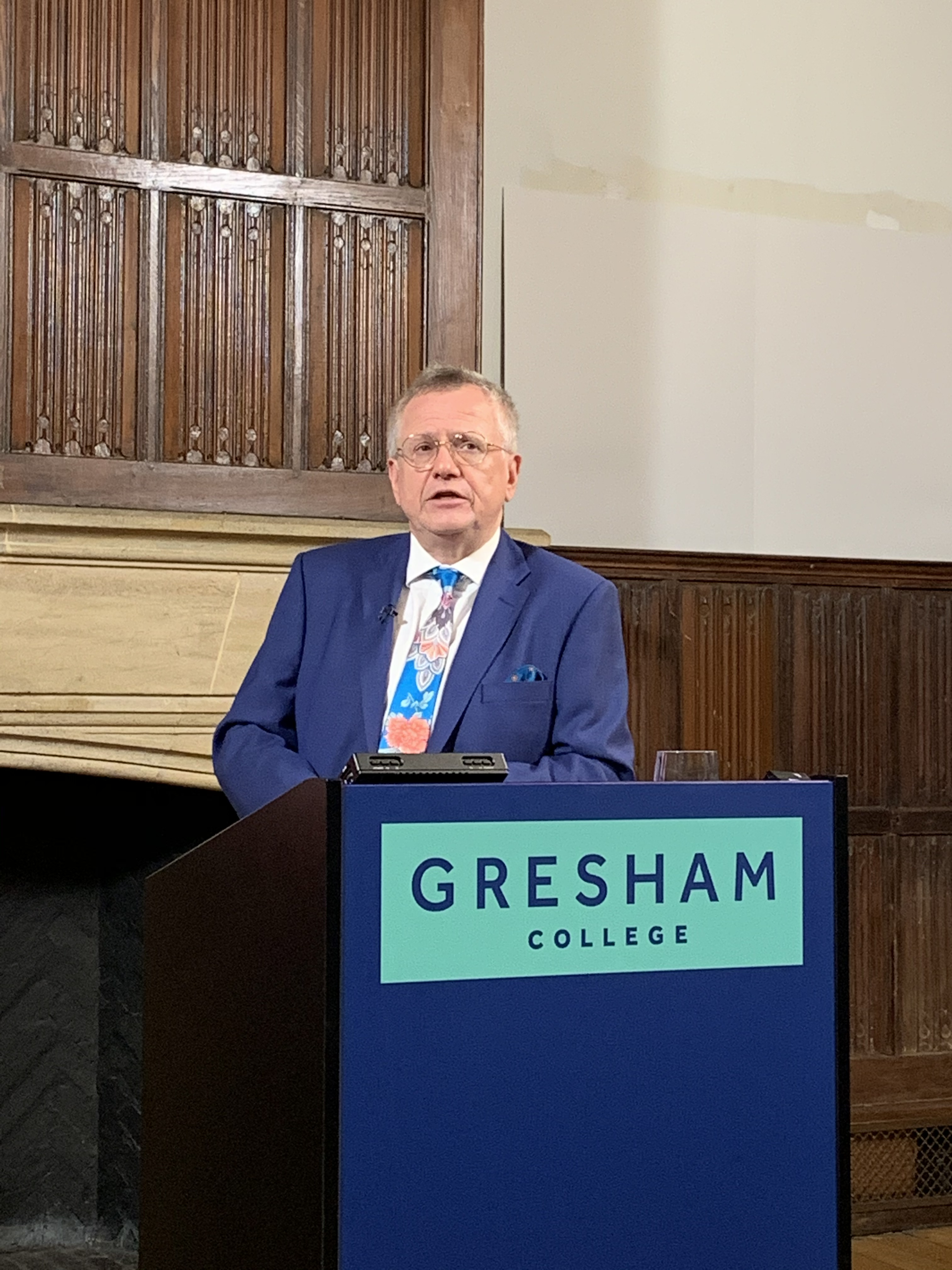
Pittock giving Gresham Lecture on Charles Edward Stuart 2020

Murray G. H. Pittock MAE FRSE (born 5 January 1962) is a Scottish historian and cultural and textual scholar. He is Bradley Professor at the University of Glasgow and serves as Pro Vice-Principal at the university, where he has occupied senior roles, including Dean and Vice-Principal, since 2008. He led the University's involvement in the Kelvin Hall redevelopment project in collaboration with the City of Glasgow and the National Library of Scotland (kelvinhall.org.uk), and since 2016 has chaired Glasgow's early career development programme, which has been considered influential across the sector.. He has also acted as lead or co-lead on various national and international partnerships, including with the Smithsonian Institution,. He serves on the governing board of the European Alliance for Arts, Social Science and the Humanities (EASSH], and is a board member and former chair of the Scottish Council on Global Affairs and co-chair of the Scottish Arts and Humanities Alliance

In 2020, he authored a major report for the Scottish Government on the economic impact of Robert Burns, the findings of which were debated in the Scottish Parliament and have since been cited in policy discussions. In 2022, he was named Scotland's Knowledge Exchange Champion of the Year..

Beyond the University of Glasgow, Pittock served on the Research Excellence Framework (REF) Institutional Environment Pilot Panel from 2018 to 2022 and again in the 2025 People, Culture and Environment Pilot Panel, and Board and Investment Committee of the National Trust for Scotland (NTS). He has recently advised both the Scottish and UK parliaments on matters related to the international promotion of Scotland and serves on the Scottish Government's Scottish Connections Advisory Panel on the diaspora.

Pittock has delivered numerous distinguished lectures, including the Chatterton, MacCormack and Caledonian lectures. He has held visiting positions globally in fields including Celtic Studies, English, History, Languages, and Equality and Diversity, at institutions such as Yale University (1998, 2000–01), the University of Wales (2002), Auburn University (2006), Trinity College Dublin (2008), Charles University in Prague (2010), the University of Notre Dame (2014), and New York University (2015). He has also been invited to speak at leading universities including Harvard, Stanford, Columbia, Berkeley, and the Sorbonne.

== Education and academia ==
Pittock obtained an M.A. from the University of Glasgow before being awarded the Snell Exhibition to study at Balliol College, Oxford, where he completed his D.Phil. While at Balliol, he was the Oxford University Debating Champion (alongside Boris Johnson) and a member of the British Isles Debating Team/ESU-USA Tour. He also ran the Express Newspapers Scottish National Debating Competition in 1982–83. Pittock has had an extensive media career, with over 2000 appearances in approximately 55 countries.

In 1989, Pittock was appointed as a lecturer at the University of Edinburgh, later becoming a reader in 1994. During his time at Edinburgh, he held several faculty and university-level roles, including serving as the corporate policy lead for Scotland-related institutional policies. In 1996, he moved to the University of Strathclyde, where he was appointed to a chair in Literature. He also served as Head of Department, a member of the Governing Body, and theme lead for Arts, Culture and Sport policy.

In 2003, Pittock joined the University of Manchester as Professor of Scottish and Romantic Literature, contributing to the transition and restructuring process associated with the merger of the university with UMIST, particularly within the Faculty of Humanities. He returned to the University of Glasgow in 2007.

== Academic work ==
Pittock's scholarly output spans a wide range of disciplines, including literature, history, art history, politics, and virtual/extended reality (VR/XR). His research includes pioneering work on Jacobite literature and military history, national culture, the construction of Celtic identities, and the development of a distinctively national Scottish Romanticism. His publications have been translated into Braille, French, Hebrew, Mandarin, and Spanish. His research in Jacobitism began by charting its persistence in culture and its importance in literature (The Invention of Scotland, Poetry and Jacobite Politics in Eighteenth-Century Britain and Ireland) before moving on to challenge understanding of Jacobite military history (The Myth of the Jacobite Clans, Culloden and After Culloden (forthcoming), while also examining Jacobite language in material culture and providing a general study of the movement (Material Culture and Sedition, Jacobitism). His contribution to Romanticism has as its central text Scottish and Irish Romanticism, ' and the 6-volume edition of The Collected Works of Allan Ramsay, combined with the 2-volume textual editions The Scots Musical Museum and The Jacobite Relics of Scotland. He has also edited collections on The Reception of Sir Walter Scott in Europe, The Reception of Robert Burns in Europe, Robert Burns in Global Culture and The Edinburgh Companion to Scottish Romanticism. The co-editor of the 3-volume Edinburgh History of Scottish Literature, he has also recently undertaken a comprehensive triptych of books on Scottish History, Scotland: the Global History, The Shortest History of Scotland and Scotland: The Cultural History (forthcoming). His Enlightenment in a Smart City has been called a 'revelatory study of “the mechanics of Enlightenment”...a model account of how certain cities became centres of intellectual and artistic innovation' Details of the multiple recognition and awards these books have received can be found on his website

More recently, he has also beem a co-investigator on the £6.4 million Museums in the Metaverse Innovation Accelerator and has led approximately 20 funded research projects throughout his career, including (currently) an economic impact assessment of the Edinburgh Festival Fringe. In 2013, Pittock planned and secured support for the establishment of a national graduate school for the arts and humanities in Scotland. The following year, he founded the International Association for the Study of Scottish Literatures (IASSL), which has organised or is planning a sequence of international congresses: Glasgow (2014), Vancouver (2017), Prague (2022), Nottingham (2024), and Nanjing, China (2027).

== Honours ==
Pittock was elected as a Fellow of the Royal Society of Edinburgh in 2004 and to Membership of the European Academy (MAE) in 2020. In 2022, he was Scotland's national Knowledge Exchange Champion, and in 2026 received a Lifetime Innovator Award for his work in Arts and Humanities from the University of Glasgow and the Glasgow Medal of the Royal Philosophical Society of Glasgow. He was also awarded the honorary degree of D.Litt. by Robert Gordon University

He has given prize lectures at both the Royal Society of Edinburgh () and the British Academy (https://www.thebritishacademy.ac.uk/events/lectures/listings/chatterton-lectures-poetry/) which began the renaissance in Robert Burns in 2002. Pittock has been described by Stelios Rigopoulos as "Scotland's leading public intellectual", by Christopher Goulding as "probably Scotland's leading cultural commentator", and by Joan McAlpine and Edinburgh University Press as "Scotland's leading cultural historian".

== Publications ==
- The Shortest History of Scotland (2026)
- Allan Ramsay: The Evergreen (with James Caudle, 2024)
- Allan Ramsay: The Tea-Table Miscellany (with Brianna Robertson-Kirkland, 2023)
- Scotland: The Global History: 1603 to the Present (2022, paperback 2023)
- Enlightenment in a Smart City: Edinburgh's Civic Development, 1660–1750 (2018; reprinted 2019, 2022)
- The Scots Musical Museum (2 vols., 2018)
- Culloden (2016; reprinted 2017, 2022; Folio Society edition, 2021)
- The Reception of Robert Burns in Europe (editor, 2014)
- The Road to Independence? Scotland in the Balance (2014)
- Material Culture and Sedition (2013)
- The Edinburgh Companion to Scottish Romanticism (editor, 2011)
- Robert Burns in Global Culture (editor, 2011)
- Loyalty and Identity (co-editor, 2010)
- The Myth of the Jacobite Clans: The Jacobite Army in 1745 (2009; revised edition, 2019)
- Scottish and Irish Romanticism (2008; corrected edition, 2011)
- The Road to Independence? Scotland Since the Sixties (2008)
- James Boswell (2007)
- The Reception of Sir Walter Scott in Europe (editor, 2007; corrected edition, 2014)
- The Edinburgh History of Scottish Literature (co-editor, 2006)
- A New History of Scotland (2003)
- James Hogg: The Jacobite Relics of Scotland (2 vols., 2002–03)
- Scottish Nationality (2001)
- Celtic Identity and the British Image (1999)
- Jacobitism (1998)
- Inventing and Resisting Britain (1997)
- The Myth of the Jacobite Clans (1995)
- Poetry and Jacobite Politics in Eighteenth-Century Britain and Ireland (1994; paperback edition, 2006)
- Spectrum of Decadence: The Literature of the 1890s (1993; reissued 2014; paperback edition, 2016)
- Clio's Clavers (1992)
- The Invention of Scotland (1991; reissued 2014; paperback edition, 2016)
