= Electronic Case Filing System =

Electronic Case Filing System (ECFS) is an automated system developed in Tarrant County, Texas that enables law enforcement agencies, criminal district attorneys, county criminal courts, criminal district courts, and the defense bar to process and exchange information about criminal offenses. ECFS software does not work on the Mac.

== History ==
ECFS was conceived in November 2002 in Tarrant County, Texas. Initially, the purpose of the system was to enable law enforcement agencies to submit offense reports to the criminal district attorney's office for possible prosecution. In July 2003, the Criminal District Attorney accepted the first electronic case filing via ECFS. Since that time, more than 100,000 cases have been filed in ECFS by the 47 Law Enforcement Agencies located in Tarrant County, Texas. ECFS was expanded in June 2004 to incorporate the Grand Jury function which is able to return indictments to the Criminal District Courts on the same day that a True Bill is decided.

In January 2005, ECFS was extended to enable judges and their court staff to effectively manage the docket (caseload) for each of the nine (9) Criminal District Courts. Since the implementation of ECFS, Tarrant County has been able to control the jail population, despite a significant increase in the number of cases being filed. In August 2005, ECFS was extended to enable members of the Tarrant County Criminal Defense Lawyers Association to browse and view defendants, offenses, and evidence via ECFS. Through this process, defense attorneys are no longer required to visit the Criminal District Attorney's Office to view and copy files.

Since January 2006, the Criminal District Attorney's Office has been completely paperless and all Offense Reports are submitted via ECFS and made available to Law Enforcement Agencies, County and District Courts, and Defense Attorneys. In July 2006, ECFS was extended to allow criminal defendants to be magistrated electronically. This process also allows the Office of Attorney appointments to be notified that the defendant has requested that defense counsel be appointed which triggers a business process that captures financial information, facilitates a determination of indigency, and when appropriate appoints defense counsel.

In 2005, the Tarrant County Criminal Defense Lawyer's Association, a non-profit charitable association, implemented its own software design to enable all attorneys, whether members of TCCDLA or not, to access the ECFS system. The software only works on PCs and will not work on Apple's Mac platform. The process enables an attorney to access his or her case files from any computer on the World Wide Web and is secure and reliable. TCCDLA has continuously revised its software process to enable access 24-7, with little downtime. TCCDLA also installed computers in the Tarrant County Justice Center that allow subscribers to access files while in the courthouse. Storm's Edge Technologies is the computer software company that exclusively provides support and design of the TCCDLA ECFS access system.

== Project contributors ==
Criminal District Attorney's Office:

- Honorable Tim Curry, Tarrant County Criminal District Attorney
- Alan Levy, Tarrant County Assistant Criminal District Attorney
- David Montague, Tarrant County Assistant Criminal District Attorney
- Betty Arvin, Tarrant County Assistant Criminal District Attorney
- Kurt Stallings, Tarrant County Assistant Criminal District Attorney
- Richard Alpert, Tarrant County Assistant Criminal District Attorney
- Mark Thielman, Tarrant County Assistant Criminal District Attorney
- Miles Brissette, Tarrant County Assistant Criminal District Attorney
- Tracey Kapsidelis, Tarrant County Assistant Criminal District Attorney
- John Cramer, Tarrant County Assistant Criminal District Attorney

Information technology:

- Steve Smith, Tarrant County Chief Information Officer
- Mark O'Neal, Tarrant County Enterprise Architect
- Scott Hill, Tarrant County Customer Service and Support Manager
- Keith Hughes, Tarrant County Quality Assurance Manager
- Steve Harrelson, Tarrant County Application Development
- Jan Debee, Tarrant County Application Development
- Martin McCreary, Tarrant County Application Development
- Phil Blankenship, Tarrant County Application Development
- Divya Gupta, Tarrant County Quality Assurance
- Bing Chen, Tarrant County Quality Assurance
- Dick Renn, Tarrant County Application Support
- Mozelle Duckett, Tarrant County Application Support

Tarrant County Criminal Defense Lawyer's Association:

- William H. "Bill" Ray, President 2008, overseer of Defense Lawyer application to ECFS

Storm's Edge Technologies:

- Dan Fitzgerald, President Storm's Edge Technologies, chief software designer and website designer for TCCDLA

Pilot Agency:

- Forest Hill Police Department - Lt. Chris Hebert and Sgt. Dan Dennis
