= Vita Sancti Niniani =

- "The Life of Saint Ninian"
- Author(s): Ailred of Rievaulx
- Patron: Perhaps a Bishop of Galloway
- Language: medieval Latin
- Date: composed mid-1100s
- Authenticity: authentic
- Principal manuscript(s): 1) British Library Cotton Tiberius D iii 2) Bodleian Library Laud Miscellaneous 668
- First printed edition: John Pinkerton, 1789
- Genre: prose hagiography
- Subject: Saint Ninian
- Setting: Anglo-Saxon Whithorn and neighbourhood
- Period covered: unclear, early middle ages
- Sources: 1) Bede's Historia ecclesiastica gentis Anglorum; 2) Liber de Vita et Miraculis (lost)

The Vita Sancti Niniani ("Life of Saint Ninian") or simply Vita Niniani ("Life of Ninian") is a Latin language Christian hagiography written in northern England in the mid-12th century. Using two earlier Anglo-Latin sources, it was written by Ailred of Rievaulx seemingly at the request of a Bishop of Galloway. It is loosely based on the career of the early British churchman Uinniau or Finnian, whose name through textual misreadings was rendered "Ninian" by high medieval English and Anglo-Norman writers, subsequently producing a distinct cult. Saint Ninian was thus an "unhistorical doppelganger" of someone else. The Vita tells "Ninian's" life-story, and relates ten miracles, six during the saint's lifetime and four posthumous.

== Authorship ==
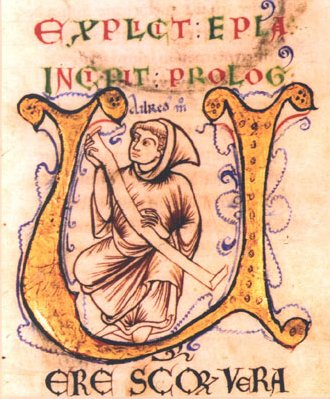
Apparently Ailred of Rievaulx in a medieval manuscript illumination

The author was almost certainly Ailred of Rievaulx. Historian John MacQueen raised doubts about this authorship in 1990, pointing out that Ailred's biographer Walter Daniel did not list it among the works of Ailred. Ailred's authorship is still accepted by most historians however, on the basis that Ailred is identified as the author in one of the two manuscripts, while in the other manuscript the Vita forms part of a collection of Ailred's works. It is thought to have been Ailred's first work of hagiography.

== Manuscripts and printed texts ==
It survives in two manuscripts, the British Library Cotton Tiberius D iii, and Bodleian Library Laud Miscellaneous 668. Apparently other versions may have previously existed. It was first printed in 1789, when John Pinkerton published an edition based on the Bodleian manuscript. The Latin text was printed in the following works:

- John Pinkerton, Vitae Antiquae Sanctorum qui Habitaverunt in ea Parte Britanniae Nunc Vocata Scotia vel in ejus Insulis (London, 1789)
- Alexander Penrose Forbes (ed.), Lives of S. Ninian and S. Kentigern. Compiled in the twelfth century (Edinburgh, 1874), pp. 137–57

Translations have been made by Forbes, and subsequently by John and Winifred MacQueen (1961, reprinted 1990 and 2005) and Jane Patricia Freeland (2006). According to Archbishop Usher, there was an Irish vita of Ninian, apparently slightly different from Ailred's; this is now lost.

== Content ==
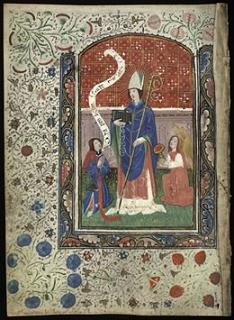
Saint "Ninian" preaching to the Picts

The Vita Niniani is miracle collection placed in a vaguely biographical format. Book i begins with a prologue and preface, discussing the intentions and sources. The narrative opens by describing how Ninian became a devoted Christian (chapter one), journeyed to Rome and became bishop (chapter two), and, arriving back in Britain, constructed a stone church at Whithorn (chapter three). Then the text relates that king Tudwallus (British: Tutagual; Gaelic: Tuathal) suffered blindness after disparaging Ninian, but was cured of his ailment when he recognised Ninian's power (chapter four). Ninian further demonstrates his saintly power by proving that a pregnant girl who had accused an innocent priest of being her child's father was lying; Ninian does this by making her baby speak to reveal the identity of the true father (chapter five). It is at this point that Ninian's conversion of the "southern Picts" is recounted (chapter six).

Ailred continues his narrative by relating how Ninian made leeks appear in a garden (chapter seven), and how the saint resurrected a robber-chief who had been gored by a bull (chapter eight). Subsequently, it is related that Ninian would read the psalms from a little book, and of how when doing so God would protect him and his book from the rain. However, one day while Ninian was travelling with an "equally saintly man" named Plebia, having stopped to sing some psalms in the rain, he "had an unlawful thought" causing God's protection against the rain to disappear; when Ninian and his book got wet, he recovered his senses and the protection reestablished itself (chapter nine). After saving the life of a novice sailing to Scotia in a coracle to evade punishment (chapter ten), Ninian dies and ascends to Heaven (chapter eleven).

Book ii consists of four posthumous miracles. A family take their deformed son to Ninian's shrine, and after being visited by Ninian in a dream during the night, their son's deformities are removed (chapter twelve). A man named Aethelfrith, through prayer, has a skin-disease cured (chapter thirteen). A girl named Deisuit is cured of blindness after being taken to Ninian's shrine (chapter fourteen), while two lepers are cured by Ninian's intervention after bathing at his well (chapter fifteen). Ailred ends the text by stressing that the miracles listed are far from exhaustive, and that more have continued up into the present.

== Sources ==
Based on assertions made by Ailred in the text, two sources were used for the Vita: Bede's Historia ecclesiastica gentis Anglorum, which mentions Ninian (as Niniau) several times, and another work "in an extremely barbarous style". Ailred mentions a place "called in English Farres Last, in Latin 'Footprint of the Bull'", evidence to some historians that he drew on an earlier source written in English. However, historian Karl Strecker undermined this argument, and it is fairly certain this "barbarous" source was written in some form of Latin.

This "barbarous" source was probably not the Miracula Nynie Episcopi, an 8th-century poem written in Latin recounting the miracles of "Nyniau". As both Bede and the Miracula reproduce the scribal error that turned Uinniau into Nyniau or Niniau, it is likely that Bede and the Miracula drew on a common source, written by 730, a source historian James E. Fraser called the Liber de Vita et Miraculis. The Liber de Vita may have been authored by Pehthelm, sometime bishop of Whithorn. It is possible that Liber de Vita was the "barbarous" source used by Ailred, either a Latin original or an English translation. This in turn may have been derived from an earlier Celtic biography of Bishop Uinniau.

== Purpose and influence ==
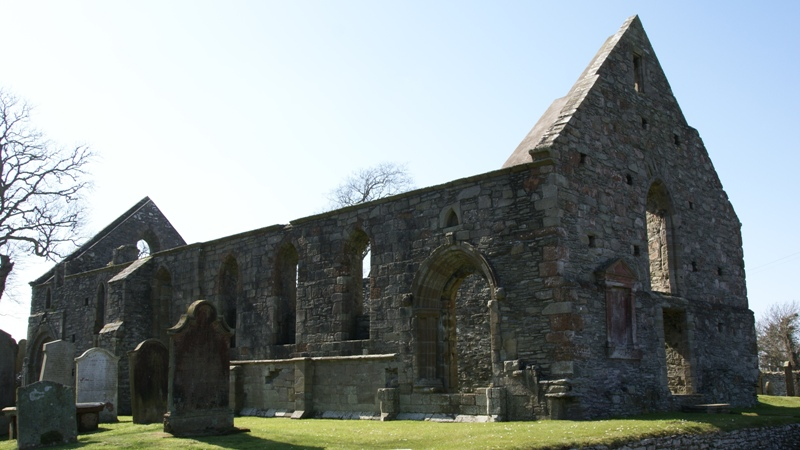
The nave of Whithorn Cathedral, centre for the cult of "Ninian"

It is thought that Ailred authored the work at the behest of one of the new bishops of Galloway, either Gille-Aldan or Christian, who were eager to promote their re-established bishopric to the Anglo-Norman and wider world. Ailred had a relationship with the ruler of Galloway, king Fergus of Galloway, according to Walter Daniel mediating a dispute between Fergus and his sons Gille-Brigte and Uhtred.

Ailred's work was the first to produce the spelling "Ninian[us]". This is a scribal error taken from the earlier form Ninia, in turn a scribal error from the form Uinniau. Thus, Ailred's work helped create what was in essence a new saint, based solely on literary texts and scribal corruptions. "Ninian" was probably unknown to either the 12th century Gaelic population of Galloway or its pre-Viking Age British predecessors, which is why the names "Ninian" and "Niniau" do not exist in Celtic place-names coined before the later Middle Ages.

Uinniau is attested as Uinniauus and Vinnianus in a 6th-century penitential used by Columbanus, Vennianus is mentioned by Columbanus himself, while Adomnán in his Vita Sancti Columbae styles the same man Finnio in the nominative case, Finnionem and Findbarrum in the accusative case, and Viniauo in the dative case. The name Uinniau is a hypocoristic form of Uindobarros, realised in Old Irish with an F (Finnbar and Finniau, hence Finnian). The saint's variety of names, owing to this and English scribal confusions, contributed to a fragmentation of Uinniau's cult where, in different locations he was venerated under a variety of guises in later periods.

There is strong modern scholarly consensus that Uinniau (thus "Ninian") and Finnian of Movilla are the same person. In one Vita on Finnian of Movilla, the Tudwallus of the Vita Niniani is realised as Túathal Máelgarb, king of Tara. Despite Ailred's work, the cult of the original Uinniau remained strong in south-western Scotland for some time to come, an important centre being Kilwinning (from the Gaelic for "church of Uinniau") where "Saint Winnin" or "Saint Finan" was worshipped into the later Middle Ages. Nevertheless, supported by a bishopric, the cult of Saint "Ninian" took a life of its own after Ailred's work, becoming one of the most venerated cults in Scotland in the Late Middle Ages.
