= Conference finals =

Conference Finals may refer to:

- NBA conference finals, National Basketball Association
- NHL conference finals, National Hockey League
- KHL conference finals, Kontinental Hockey League
