= Eighteenth-Century Fiction =

- Discipline: Literature
- Language: English
- Edited by: Eugenia Zuroski

Publication details
- History: 1988-present
- Publisher: University of Toronto Press (Canada)
- Frequency: Quarterly

Standard abbreviations
- ISO 4: Eighteenth-Century Fiction

Indexing
- ISSN: 0840-6286 (print); 1911-0243 (web)

Links
- Journal homepage

Eighteenth-Century Fiction is a quarterly peer-reviewed academic journal dedicated to the critical and historical investigation of literature and culture of the period 1660–1832. It is published by the University of Toronto Press.

== Abstracting and indexing ==
The journal is abstracted and indexed in:

- Academic Search Elite
- Academic Search Premier
- Annual Bibliography of English Language and Literature
- Arts and Humanities Citations Index
- Canadian Business & Current Affairs (CBCA)
- Canadian Reference Centre
- China Education Publications Import & Export Corporation (CEPIEC)
- CrossRef
- Current Contents
- Current Contents—Arts and Humanities
- EJS EBSCO Electronic Journals Service
- Google Scholar
- Historical Abstracts
- Humanities International Index
- Microsoft Academic Search
- MLA International Bibliography
- Project MUSE
- Scopus
- Ulrich's Periodicals Directory
