= Peter McKay =

Peter McKay or Peter MacKay may refer to:

== Politicians ==
- Peter MacKay (born 1965), Canadian politician
- Peter McKay (Australian politician) (born 1948), member of the Tasmanian Legislative Council

== Others ==
- Peter Mackay, 4th Earl of Inchcape (born 1943)
- Peter Mackay (Gaelic: Pàdraig MacAoidh) (born 1979), Makar (National Poet for Scotland)
- Peter McKay (cricketer) (born 1994), English cricketer
- Peter McKay (curator), Australian art curator at Queensland Art Gallery and Gallery of Modern Art
- Peter McKay (footballer) (1925–2000), Scottish footballer
- Peter Mackay (journalist) (1926–2013) British-Southern African political activist
