= Douglas Dunn =

Scottish poet (1942–2026)

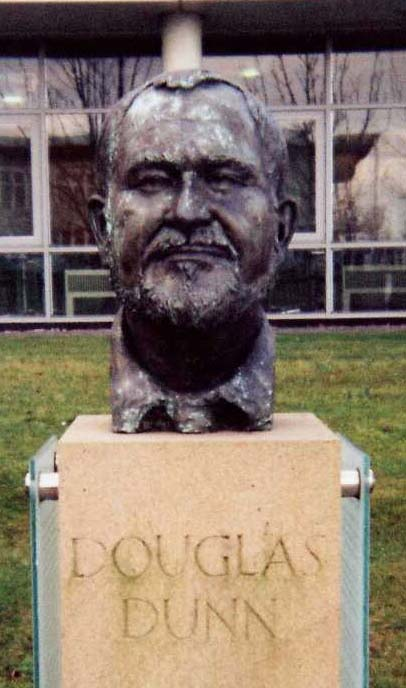
Bust of Douglas Dunn at Edinburgh Park.

Douglas Eaglesham Dunn, OBE FRSL (23 October 1942 – 16 October 2026) was a Scottish poet, academic and critic. He was Professor of English and Director of St Andrews Scottish Studies Institute at St Andrews University.

== Early life and education ==
Dunn was born on 23 October 1942, the son of William Dunn and Margaret McGowan, and grew up in Inchinnan, Renfrewshire. He was educated at the Scottish School of Librarianship, and worked as a librarian before he started his studies in Hull. After graduating with a First Class Honours degree in English from the University of Hull, he worked in the university's Brynmor Jones Library under Philip Larkin. Dunn was friendly with Larkin and admired his poetry, but did not share his political opinions.

== Career ==
Dunn was a Professor of English at the University of St Andrews from 1991, becoming Director of the University's Scottish Studies Centre in 1993 until his retirement in September 2008. He was then an Honorary Professor at St Andrews, still undertaking postgraduate supervision in the School of English. He was a member of the Scottish Arts Council (1992–1994).

Terry Street, Dunn's first collection of poems, appeared in 1969 and received a Scottish Arts Council Book Award as well as a Somerset Maugham Award. Evoking his time working in Hull, the poems take as their inspiration working class life on a street of back-to-backs just off the Beverley Road (the street remains today, but all of the houses have been replaced).

== Marriages and children ==
Dunn was married three times. His first wife was Lesley Balfour who he married in 1964. Lesley died of cancer in 1981 at the age of 37. His second wife was Lesley Bathgate with whom he had two children; Robbie, born in 1987, and Lilias, in 1990. They separated and Dunn was married thirdly to Beth in 2024.

== Death ==
Douglas Dunn died on 16 October 2026, aged 83.

== Honours ==
Dunn was awarded the honorary degrees of LLD by the University of Dundee and DLitt by the Universities of Hull and St Andrews.

He became a Fellow of the Royal Society of Literature (FRSL) in 1981 and was appointed an Officer of the Order of the British Empire (OBE) for "services to literature" in the 2003 Birthday Honours.

Dunn was awarded the Queen's Gold Medal for Poetry in 2013 in recognition of his lifetime contribution to literature.

Additionally he received:

- 1968 Eric Gregory Award
- 1969 Scottish Arts Council Book Award for Terry Street
- 1969 Somerset Maugham Award for Terry Street
- 1976 Scottish Arts Council Book Award for Love or Nothing
- 1976 Geoffrey Faber Memorial Prize for Love or Nothing
- 1981 Hawthornden Prize for St. Kilda's Parliament
- 1985 Whitbread Book of the Year for Elegies
- 1989 Cholmondeley Award

== Selected works ==
- Terry Street – 1969 (winner of the Somerset Maugham Award)
- The Happier Life – 1972
- Love or Nothing – 1974 (winner of the Geoffrey Faber Memorial Prize)
- Barbarians – 1979
- St. Kilda's Parliament – 1981 (winner of the Hawthornden Prize)
- Europa's Lover – 1982
- Elegies – 1985
- Secret Villages (collection of short stories) – 1985
- Northlight – 1988
- Andromache (translation of Racine's play of the same name) – 1990
- Dante's Drum-Kit – 1993
- Boyfriends and Girlfriends – 1995
- The Donkey's Ears – 2000
- The Year's Afternoon – 2000
- New Selected Poems 1964-2000 – 2002
- Invisible Ink – 2011
- The Noise of a Fly – 2017

== Reviews ==
- White, Kenneth (1982), review of St. Kilda's Parliament, in Murray, Glen (ed.), Cencrastus No. 8, Spring 1982, pp.44 & 45, ISSN 0264-0856
- Craig, Cairns (1984), Lourd on My Hert, which includes a review of Europa's Lover, in Hearn, Sheila G. (ed.), Cencrastus No. 15, New Year 1984, pp. 54 & 55, ISSN 0264-0856
