= Liz Lochhead =

Scottish poet and essayist (born 1947)

Liz Lochhead Hon FRSE
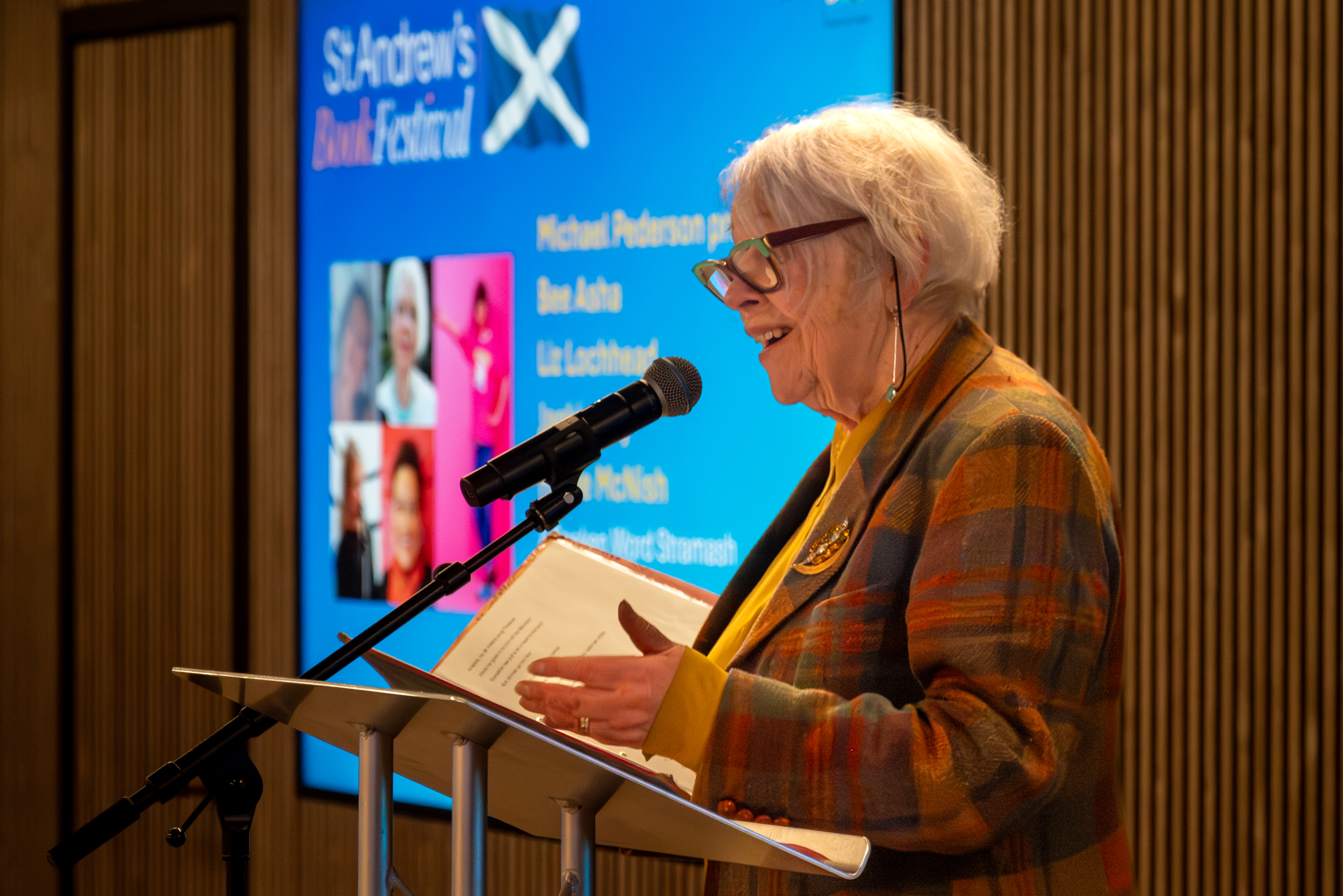
- Lochhead speaks at the 2024 St Andrew's Book Festival.

Makar
- In office 19 January 2011 – 31 January 2016
- Preceded by: Edwin Morgan
- Succeeded by: Jackie Kay

Personal details
- Born: Elizabeth Anne Lochhead; 26 December 1947 (age 78) Craigneuk, Lanarkshire, Scotland
- Education: Glasgow School of Art
- Occupation: Teacher, poet, playwright, Makar

Liz Lochhead Hon FRSE (born 26 December 1947) is a Scottish poet, playwright, translator and broadcaster. Between 2011 and 2016 she was the Makar, or National Poet of Scotland, and served as Poet Laureate for Glasgow between 2005 and 2011.

== Early life ==
Elizabeth Anne Lochhead was born in Craigneuk, a "little ex-mining village just outside Motherwell", Lanarkshire. Her mother and father had both served in the army during the Second World War, and later, her father was a local government clerk. In 1952, the family moved into a new council house in the mining village of Newarthill, where her sister was born in 1957. Though she was encouraged by her teachers to study English, Lochhead was determined to go to Glasgow School of Art where she studied between 1965 and 1970. After graduation Lochhead taught art at high schools in Glasgow and Bristol, a career at which she says she was "terrible"

== Career ==
Having written poetry as a child and whilst studying at Art School, Lochhead won a BBC Scotland Poetry Competition in 1971, and Gordon Wright published her first collection of Poetry, Memo For Spring in 1972 under his Reprographia imprint.

It is often claimed that at this time Lochhead was part of a Philip Hobsbaum writers' group, a crucible of creative activity – with other members including Alasdair Gray, James Kelman, Tom Leonard, Aonghas MacNeacail and Jeff Torrington, Liz Lochhead has repeatedly claimed this to be an invention. She has however recalled the support and inspiration she drew from the Scottish poetry scene of the early 1970s and meetings with the elder generation - Norman MacCaig, Edwin Morgan, Robert Garioch – and with contemporaries such as Leonard, Kelman and Gray. Lochhead went on to produce revue shows with Leonard and Gray, including Tickly Mince, and The Pie of Damocles. Over the following years Lochhead published further collections Islands (1978) and The Grimm Sisters (1979) and moved first to Toronto as part of the first Scottish/Canadian writers exchange and later made her home in New York. In 1986 she returned permanently to Glasgow.

Lochhead's success in poetry was rivalled by her writing for the theatre. Her plays include Blood and Ice (1982), Mary Queen of Scots Got Her Head Chopped Off (1987), Perfect Days (2000) and a highly acclaimed adaptation into Scots of Molière's Tartuffe (1985). She adapted the medieval texts of the York Mystery Plays, performed by a largely amateur cast at York Theatre Royal in 1992 and 1996. Her adaptation of Euripides' Medea won the Saltire Society Scottish Book of the Year Award in 2001. Her plays have been performed on BBC Radio 4: Blood and Ice (11 June 1990), The Perfect Days (16 May 1999), Mary Queen of Scots Got Her Head Chopped Off (11 February 2001) and The Stanley Baxter Playhouse: Mortal Memories (26 June 2006). Her adaptation of Helen Simpson's short story Burns and the Bankers was broadcast on BBC Radio 4 on Burns Night, 25 January 2012. Her plays Educating Agnes and Thebans premiered in the early 2000s, and in 2011 as part of the Glasgay Festival, Liz Lochhead's play Edwin Morgan's Dreams and Other Nightmares premiered at the Tron and it was revived three years later as part of the cultural celebrations for the commonwealth games. She has produced many new works for the Oran Mor in Glasgow, including Mortal Memories (2012) and Between the Thinks Bubble and the Speech Balloon (2014) with Tom Leonard, William Letford, Grace Cleary, and Henry Bell.

Like her work for theatre, her poetry is alive with vigorous speech idioms; later collections include True Confessions and New Clichés (1985), Bagpipe Muzak (1991), Dreaming Frankenstein: and Collected Poems (1984), The Colour of Black and White (2003) and A Choosing (2011). Liz Lochhead also enjoys writing songs and combining poetry with music and she has collaborated with Dundee singer-songwriter Michael Marra to whom she dedicated the poem 'Ira and George'. as well as providing guest vocals on the track 'Trouble is Not a Place' from the 2014 EP The Bird That Never Flew by Glaswegian experimental hip hop group Hector Bizerk. She has also collaborated extensively with saxophonist Steve Kettley and Dundonian band The Hazey Janes.

== Politics ==
Lochhead is a republican and vocal supporter of Scottish independence, having performed with pro-independence group National Collective, and opined in The Guardian that Robert Burns would have voted for independence.

Lochhead is also well known as a feminist, both from her writing and public appearances; she has said in the past, 'feminism is like the hoovering, you just have to keep doing it.'

In 2012, Lochhead travelled to Palestine, and was deeply affected by what she saw in the West Bank. She has been a firm opponent of the Israeli occupation, and a supporter of the call for a cultural boycott of Israel. In 2014, she was involved in preparing A Bird is Not a Stone, an anthology of contemporary Palestinian poetry translated into the languages of Scotland.

Lochhead is openly critical of Scottish arts funding body Creative Scotland.

== Honours and awards ==
In 2005, Lochhead became the Poet Laureate for Glasgow, a position she held until stepping down in 2011, when she was named as the second Scots Makar, or national poet of Scotland, succeeding Edwin Morgan who had died the previous year. She stepped down from this role in February 2016, and was succeeded by Jackie Kay in March 2016.

She is currently the Honorary President of the Caledonian Cultural Fellows at Glasgow Caledonian University. and holds honorary doctorates from ten of Scotland's universities.

She was writer in residence at Duncan of Jordanstone College of Art and Design in 1980 and later at Glasgow University, The University of Edinburgh, Glasgow School of Art, the Royal Shakespeare Company, and Eton.

In 2014 she was elected an Honorary Fellow of the Royal Society of Edinburgh.

In 2015 Liz Lochhead was awarded the Queen's Gold Medal for Poetry. Lochhead is only the 11th woman to have been awarded the prize since its inception in 1933, and the eighth Scot.

A statue of her face was erected at Edinburgh Park, along with those of other famous Scottish poets. The statue contains engravings of her poems.

In 2023, at the Book Awards Ceremony in Glasgow, Lochhead was the winner of the Lifetime Achievement Award.

== Personal life ==
In 1986, Liz Lochhead married the architect Tom Logan. The couple lived together in Glasgow until his death in 2010. After his death she wrote the poem Favourite Place about their caravan on the West Coast of Scotland. It ends:

But tonight you are three months dead
and I must pull down the bed and lie in it alone.
Tomorrow, and every day in this place
these words of Sorley MacLean’s will echo through me:
The world is still beautiful, though you are not in it.
And this will not be a consolation
but a further desolation.

== Published works ==
- 1972: Memo For Spring. Reprographia.
- 1978: Islands. Print Studio Press.
- 1979: The Grimm Sisters. Coach House Press.
- 1999: Bagpipe Muzak. Penguin Books.
- 1999: Perfect Days. Nick Hern Books.
- 2000: Medea. Nick Hern Books.
- 2001: Cuba (with Gina Moxley). Faber & Faber.
- 2002: Misery Guts. Nick Hern Books.
- 2003: The Colour of Black and White. Polygon.
- 2003: Dreaming Frankenstein and Collected Poems, 1967–84. Polygon.
- 2003: Thebans. Nick Hern Books.
- 2003: True Confessions: And New Cliches. Polygon.
- 2006: Good Things. Nick Hern Books.
- 2009: Educating Agnes. Nick Hern Books.
- 2009: Blood and Ice. Nick Hern Books.
- 2010: Mary Queen of Scots Got Her Head Chopped Off. Nick Hern Books.
- 2011: A Choosing. Polygon
- 2012: Liz Lochhead: Five Plays. Nick Hern Books.

== Radio plays ==
Radio Plays adapted by Liz Lochhead
Date first broadcast	Play	Director	Cast	Synopsis Awards	Station Series
25 January 2012	Burns and the Bankers	Amber Barnfather	Sophie Thompson, John Sessions, Greg Wise, Peter Forbes, David McKay, Angela Darcy, Siobhan Redmond, Phoebe Waller-Bridge and Maynard Eziashi	Helen Simpson's satirical and poignant short story, dramatised for radio by Liz Lochhead. Nicola Beaumont (English, partner in a law firm, mother of four) reluctantly sits down to a long-winded corporate Burns Supper. At first impatient with the whisky-fuelled pomposity around her, Nicola finds herself surprisingly moved as the traditional rituals of a Burns Night unfold. What she comes to learn about the eighteenth-century Scots poet brings new self-knowledge and helps her through the night's violent emotions and climactic events.	BBC Radio 4 Afternoon Drama

== Reviews ==
- Mills, Paul (1982), The Individual Voice, which includes a review of The Grimm Sisters, in Murray, Glen (ed.), Cencrastus No. 8, Spring 1982, pp. 45 & 46, ISSN 0264-0856
