= Glasgow LGBT Centre =

LGBT community centre in Glasgow, Scotland

Coordinates: 55.858°N 4.244°W

The 'Glasgow LGBT Centre' was a lesbian, gay, bisexual, and transgender community centre located at 84 Bell Street, Glasgow G1 1LQ. It was fully wheelchair-accessible, with a chairlift. It closed in April 2009, following withdrawal of funding from Glasgow City Council. This in turn was caused by reported concerns (unfounded, the Centre Board and AGM claim, and yet to be substantiated) of mismanagement.

On 17 March 1991, the first ceilidh was held to raise funds for and awareness of the planned Centre, and this has since become an annual event. Other funding was received from sources such as Strathclyde Regional Social Strategy, Strathclyde Lesbigay Forum, and the Glasgow Development Agency. The chairlift was funded by a grant from Glasgow District Council.

The Centre (then called Glasgow Gay and Lesbian Centre) was opened at premises in Dixon Street (just off St Enoch Square) on November 4, 1995. The building was converted from a file store for the Procurator Fiscal. The opening was attended by politicians George Galloway, Maria Fyfe, Mike Watson, and Bill Miller: also by singer Horse and poet Edwin Morgan, who read a poem specially written to mark the opening. The centre then closed for several months to allow building to continue, and was formally opened on March 20, 1996 by Joyce Keller, Mayor of Manchester.

The old Centre included a cafe/bar, four offices which were rented to LGBT-friendly businesses, and two meeting rooms called the Jackie Forster Memorial Room and the Ian Dunn Memorial Room. It was regularly used by many LGBT community groups for meetings and events.

In 2008, the Centre took the controversial step of banning ScotsGay magazine from its premises on the grounds that its adult content is incompatible with the Centre's status as a family-friendly venue.

In 2008, the Centre moved to new premises in Bell Street, Glasgow.

In 2010, the Centre, named Castro, was locked out of its premises in Bell Street after it emerged that the centre had serious financial irregularities.
