= Duncan Macmillan (art historian) =

Scottish art historian (born 1939)

John Duncan Macmillan FRSA FRSE HRSA (born 7 March 1939) is a Scottish art historian, art critic, and writer.

== Biography ==
He is the elder son of William Miller Macmillan. Born in 1939, and educated at Gordonstoun School, he obtained his MA degree at the University of St Andrews, his Academic Diploma at the Courtauld Institute, University of London, and his PhD at the University of Edinburgh. He is an honorary graduate of the University of Dundee. Macmillan is Professor Emeritus of the History of Scottish Art at the University of Edinburgh, and a former Curator of the Talbot Rice Gallery. Between 2008 and 2012 he was curator of the Royal Society of Edinburgh. He is also art critic for The Scotsman.

== Works ==
His works include Painting in Scotland: the Golden Age (Oxford 1986), and Scottish Art 1460-1990 (Edinburgh 2000), According to Cairns Craig, the book views Scottish art as emanating from public art practices of the Protestant Reformation. The Times Literary Supplement considered that Macmillan was excellent on the Renaissance but later prone to "a certain unevenness". Nonetheless, the "TLS" praised his "intellectual underpinning" and treatments of William Quiller Orchardson and William McTaggart. In 1991 this book won the Saltire Society Scottish Book of the Year award. Macmillan's works also include Scottish Art in the 20th Century (Edinburgh 1994, Scottish Arts Council Book Award), and Scotland's Shrine: The Scottish National War Memorial, which is accompanied by a foreword by Her Majesty Queen Elizabeth II (Lund Humphries, 2014).

Macmillan is author of monographs on Scottish and European artists, including Will Maclean, Steven Campbell, Elizabeth Blackadder, Victoria Crowe, and (with Tom Hewlett) of FCB Cadell. His 2015 critique of intellectual and moral probity in the contemporary art world, entitled The Thought Police, appeared in Treason of the Scholars.

His Scotland and the Origins of Modern Art was published by Lund Humphries in 2023.

== Distinctions ==
In 2004 he was awarded the Henry Duncan Prize for his contribution to Scottish Historiography by the Royal Society of Edinburgh.

In 2005 he was awarded the Andrew Fletcher of Saltoun Prize for his contribution to Scottish life by the Saltire Society.

In 2018 he was awarded the Sir Walter Scott Medal of the Royal Society of Edinburgh for his outstanding contribution to the appreciation of Scottish Art and its place within the European Tradition.

== Bibliography ==
=== Books ===
- Duncan Macmillan, Painting in Scotland: the Golden Age (Phaidon, 1986)
- Duncan Macmillan, Scottish Art 1460-1990 (Mainstream, 1990)
- Duncan Macmillan, Symbols of Survival, The Art of Will Maclean (revised edition 2002)
- Duncan Macmillan, Scottish Art in the 20th Century (1994)
- Duncan Macmillan, Elizabeth Blackadder (Scolar Press, 1999, ISBN 0754600637), on Scottish painter and printmaker Elizabeth Blackadder
- Duncan Macmillan, Scottish Art 1460-2000 (Mainstream, 2nd edition, 2000, ISBN 1840182555)
- Tom Hewlett and Duncan Macmillan, F.C.B. Cadell: The Life and Works of a Scottish Colourist 1883-1937 (Lund Humphries, 2011)
- Duncan Macmillan, Victoria Crowe (Antique Collectors' Club, 2012), on Scottish artist Victoria Crowe
- Duncan Macmillan, Scotland's Shrine: The Scottish National War Memorial (Lund Humphries, 2014)
- Duncan Macmillan, Scotland and the Origins of Modern Art (Lund Humphries, 2023, ISBN 978-1-84822-633-3)

=== Articles ===
- The Tradition of Painting in Scotland, in Cencrastus No. 1, Autumn 1979, pp. 36 – 38, ISSN 0264-0856
- Scotland and the Art of Nationalism, in Cencrastus No. 4, Winter 1980-81, pp. 33 – 35, ISSN 0264-0856
- Scottish Painting 1500 - 1700, in Hearn, Sheila G. (ed.), Cencrastus No. 15, New Year 1984, pp. 25 – 29, ISSN 0264-0856
- Scottish Painting: Ramsay to Raeburn, in Parker, Geoffrey (ed.), Cencrastus No. 17, Summer 1984, pp. 25 – 29, ISSN 0264-0856
- Scottish Painting: The Later Enlightenment, in Parker, Geoffrey (ed.), Cencrastus No. 19, Winter 1984, pp. 25 – 27, ISSN 0264-0856
