= Lucozade (disambiguation) =

Lucozade is a soft drink.

Lucozade may also refer to:

- Lucozade (poem), by Jackie Kay
- "Lucozade", by Zayn Malik from his 2016 album Mind of Mine
