= Jackie Kay =

Scottish poet, novelist and non-fiction writer (born 1961)

Jackie Kay CBE FRSE FRSL
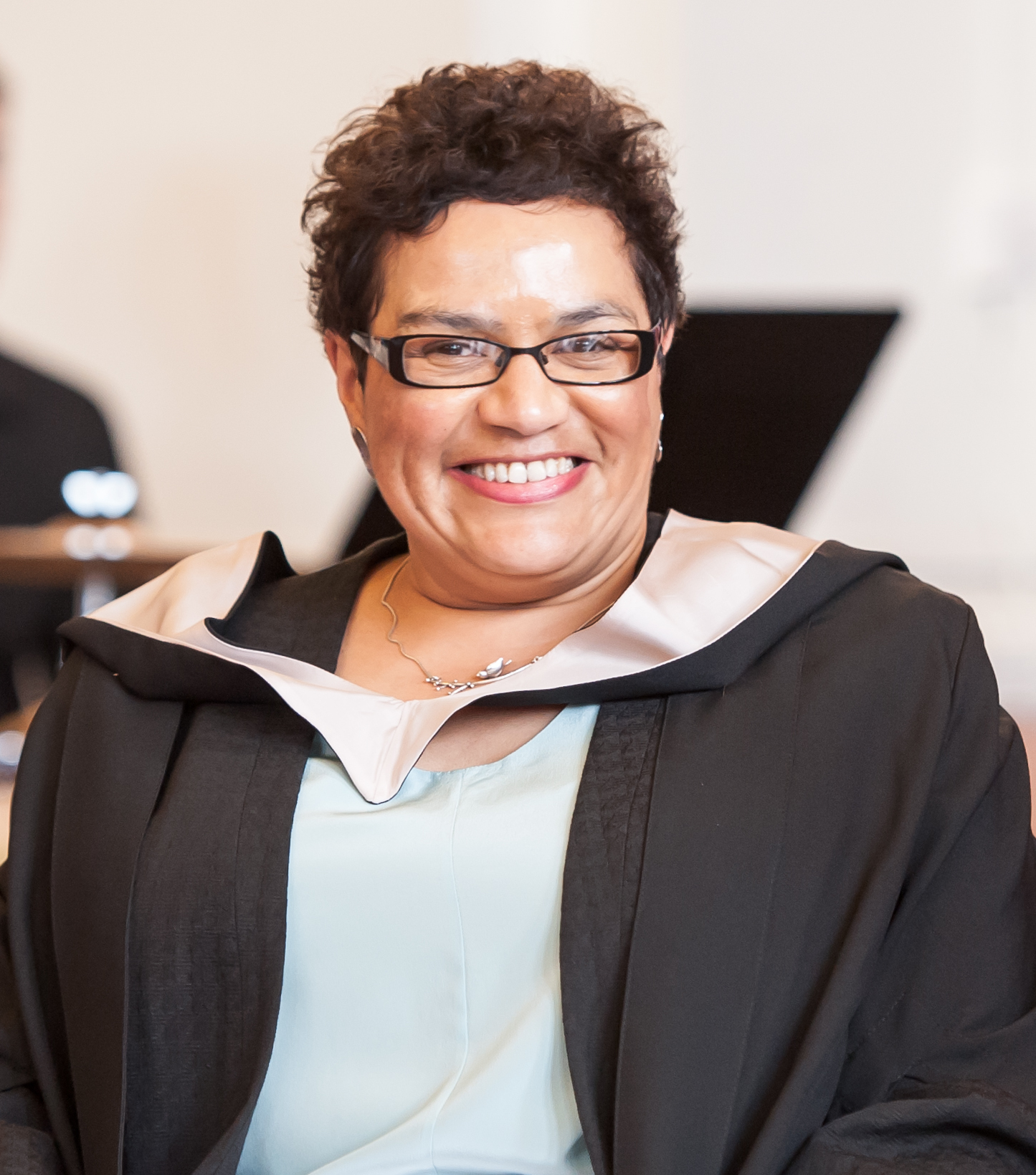
- Kay in 2015

Makar
- In office 15 March 2016 – 14 March 2021
- Preceded by: Liz Lochhead
- Succeeded by: Kathleen Jamie

Personal details
- Born: Jacqueline Margaret Kay; 9 November 1961 (age 64) Edinburgh, Scotland
- Education: University of Stirling
- Occupation: Professor of creative writing at Newcastle University
- Known for: Poet and novelist Makar, 2016–2021
- Awards: Somerset Maugham Award (1994); Guardian Fiction Prize (1998); Scottish Mortgage Investment Trust Book of the Year Award (2011)

Jacqueline Margaret Kay (born 9 November 1961) is a Scottish poet, playwright, and novelist, known for her works Other Lovers (1993), Trumpet (1998) and Red Dust Road (2011). Kay has won many awards, including the Somerset Maugham Award in 1994, the Guardian Fiction Prize in 1998 and the Scottish Mortgage Investment Trust Book of the Year Award in 2011.

From 2016 to 2021, Jackie Kay was the Makar, the poet laureate of Scotland. She was Chancellor of the University of Salford between 2015 and 2022.

== Early life and education ==
Jackie Kay was born in Edinburgh, Scotland, in 1961, to a Scottish mother and a Nigerian father. She was adopted as a baby by a white Scottish couple, Helen and John Kay, and grew up in Bishopbriggs, a suburb of Glasgow. They adopted Jackie in 1961, having already adopted her brother, Maxwell, about two years earlier. Jackie also has siblings who were brought up by her biological parents.

Her adoptive father worked for the Communist Party full-time and stood for Member of Parliament, and her adoptive mother was the Scottish secretary of Campaign for Nuclear Disarmament. As a child, Kay suffered racism from children and teachers at school. John Kay died in 2019 at the age of 94. Helen Kay died in 2021 at age 90.

As a teenager she worked as a cleaner, working for David Cornwell—who wrote under the pen-name John le Carré—for four months. She recommended cleaning work to aspiring writers, saying: "It's great ... You're listening to everything. You can be a spy, but nobody thinks you're taking anything in." Cornwell and Kay met again in 2019; he remembered her and had been following her.

In August 2007, Kay was featured in the fourth episode of the BBC Radio 4 series The House I Grew Up In, in which she talked about her childhood.

== Career ==
Initially thinking of being an actor, she decided to concentrate on writing after Alasdair Gray, a Scottish artist and writer, read her poetry and told her that writing was what she should be doing. She studied English at the University of Stirling and her first book of poetry, the partially autobiographical, The Adoption Papers, was published in 1991 and won the Saltire Society Scottish First Book Award and a Scottish Arts Council Book Award in 1992. It is a multiple voiced collection of poetry that deals with identity, race, nationality, gender, and sexuality from the perspectives of three women: an adopted biracial child, her adoptive mother, and her biological mother. Her other prizes include the 1994 Somerset Maugham Award for Other Lovers, and the Guardian Fiction Prize for Trumpet, inspired by the life of American jazz musician Billy Tipton, a transgender man.

In 1997, Kay published a biography of blues singer Bessie Smith; it was reissued in 2021. An abridged version read by the author featured as BBC Radio 4's Book of the Week in the last week of February 2021.

Kay writes extensively for stage (in 1988 her play Twice Over was the first by a Black writer to be produced by Gay Sweatshop Theatre Group), screen and for children. Her drama The Lamplighter is an exploration of the Atlantic slave trade. It was broadcast on BBC Radio 3 in March 2007, produced by Pam Fraser Solomon, during a season marking the bicentenary of the Slave Trade Act 1807, and was published in printed form as a poem in 2008.

In 2010 Kay published Red Dust Road, an account of her search for her biological parents, who had met each other when her father was a student at Aberdeen University and her mother was a nurse. The book was adapted for the stage by Tanika Gupta and premiered in August 2019 at the Edinburgh International Festival in a production by National Theatre of Scotland and HOME, at the Royal Lyceum Theatre in Edinburgh. Comparisons have been drawn between this work and Looking for Transwonderland by Noo-Saro-Wiwa.

She is currently Professor of Creative Writing at Newcastle University, and Cultural Fellow at Glasgow Caledonian University. Kay lives in Manchester. She took part in the Bush Theatre's 2011 project Sixty-Six Books, her piece being based on the book of Esther from the King James Bible. In October 2014, it was announced that she had been appointed as the Chancellor of the University of Salford, and that she would be the university's "Writer in Residence" from 1 January 2015.

In March 2016, Kay was announced as the next Scots Makar (national poet of Scotland), succeeding Liz Lochhead, whose tenure ended in January 2016.

She was appointed Member of the Order of the British Empire (MBE) in the 2006 Birthday Honours for services to literature, and Commander of the Order of the British Empire (CBE) in the 2020 New Year Honours, again for services to literature. Kay was on the list of the BBC's 100 Women announced on 23 November 2020.

In September 2024, it was announced that the National Library of Scotland had acquired Kay's literary archive.

In June 2025, Kay will lead the Salford Literacy Symposium at the University of Salford. It is the inaugural conference with the purpose of engaging more young readers. The conference is part of the larger National Literacy Trust's campaign to increase literacy rates throughout Salford.

== Personal life ==
Kay is lesbian. In her twenties she gave birth to a son, Matthew (whose father is the writer Fred D'Aguiar), and later she had a 15-year relationship with poet Carol Ann Duffy. During this relationship, Duffy had a daughter, Ella, whose biological father is fellow poet Peter Benson.

== Awards and honours ==
External videos
- Jackie Kay, vimeo format

- 1991: Eric Gregory Award
- 1992: Scottish First Book of the Year, The Adoption Papers
- 1994: Somerset Maugham Award, Other Lovers
- 1998: Guardian Fiction Prize, Trumpet
- 2000: International Dublin Literary Award (shortlist), Trumpet
- 2000: Lambda Literary Award for Transgender Literature, Trumpet
- 2002: Elected a Fellow of the Royal Society of Literature
- 2003: Cholmondeley Award
- 2006: MBE, Services to Literature
- 2007: British Book Awards deciBel Writer of the Year
- 2009: Scottish Book of the Year (shortlist), The Lamplighter
- 2011: Scottish Book of the Year (shortlist), Fiere
- 2011: Costa Book Awards (shortlist), Fiere
- 2011: PEN/Ackerley Prize (shortlist), Red Dust Road
- 2011: Scottish Mortgage Investment Trust Book of the Year Award (Non-Fiction category), Red Dust Road
- 2016: Elected a Fellow of the Royal Society of Edinburgh
- 2016: The Scots Makar
- 2020: CBE, Services to Literature

== Selected works ==
- The Adoption Papers, Bloodaxe Books, 1991, ISBN 9781852241568 (poetry)
- Other Lovers, Bloodaxe Books, 1993, ISBN 9781852242534 (poetry)
- Off Colour, Bloodaxe Books, 1998, ISBN 9781852244200 (poetry)
- Trumpet (fiction – 1998); Random House Digital, Inc., 2011, ISBN 9780307560810
- The Frog who Dreamed she was an Opera Singer, Bloomsbury Children's Books, 1998, ISBN 9780747538660
- Two's Company, Puffin Books, 1994, ISBN 9780140369526
- Bessie Smith (biography – 1997), Faber & Faber, 2021, ISBN 978-0571362929
- Why Don't You Stop Talking (fiction – 2002); Pan Macmillan, 2012, ISBN 9781447206729
- Strawgirl, Macmillan Children's, 2002, ISBN 9780330480635
- Life Mask, Bloodaxe Books, 2005, ISBN 9781852246914 (poetry)
- Wish I Was Here (fiction – 2006); Pan Macmillan, 2012, ISBN 9781447206736
- Darling: New & Selected Poems, Bloodaxe Books, 2007, ISBN 9781852247775 (poetry)
- The Lamplighter, Bloodaxe Books, 2008, ISBN 9781852248048 (poetry/radio play)
- Red, Cherry Red, Bloomsbury Publishing Plc, 2007, ISBN 9780747589792
- Maw Broon Monologues (2009) (shortlisted for the Ted Hughes Award for New Work in Poetry)
- Red Dust Road: An Autobiographical Journey. Atlas and Company. 2011. ISBN 9781935633358. "Jackie Kay." (memoir)
- Fiere, Pan Macmillan, 2011, ISBN 9781447206576 (poetry)
- Reality, Reality, Pan Macmillan, 2012, ISBN 9781447204404
- The Empathetic Store, Mariscat Press, 2015, ISBN 9780946588794 (poetry)
- Bantam, Pan Macmillan, 2017, ISBN 9781509863174 (poetry)
- "The Writing Life", in The Women Writers Handbook, Aurora Metro Books, 2020, ISBN 978-1912430338
- May Day, Picador, 2024, ISBN 9781509864836 (poetry)

Some other poetry used in GCSE Edexcel Syllabus

- "Brendon Gallacher"
- "Lucozade"
- "Yellow"

== See also ==
- Twice Through the Heart – opera with libretto by Kay.
