= William Miller Macmillan =

Founder of the liberal school of South African historiography

- Born: 1 October 1885; Aberdeen, Scotland
- Died: 23 October 1974 (aged 89); Long Wittenham, Berkshire, England
- Occupation: Historian

William Miller Macmillan (1 October 1885 in Aberdeen, Scotland – 23 October 1974 in Long Wittenham, Berkshire, England) is regarded as a founder of the liberal school of South African historiography and as a forerunner of the radical school of historiography that emerged in the 1970s. He was also a critic of colonial rule and an early advocate of self-government for colonial territories in Africa and of what became known as development aid.

== Early life ==
Macmillan was born in Aberdeen, Scotland on 1 October 1885. He was the son of the Reverend John Macmillan (born Glen Urquhart, Inverness, Scotland 1831, died Stellenbosch, South Africa, 1909). His mother was Elizabeth Caird Lindsay (born Glasgow, Scotland 1845, died Cape Town, South Africa, 1927). John Macmillan served with the Free Church of Scotland mission in India and was a founder with the Reverend William Miller of the Free Church College in Madras, India, now the Madras Christian College.

William Macmillan travelled to South Africa in 1891 with his mother and five elder siblings to join his father, who was working at the Victoria College, Stellenbosch, now the University of Stellenbosch. He attended the Boys High School, Stellenbosch, and did the first two years of the BA degree at the Victoria College, matriculating in 1901 and passing the intermediate exams in 1903. Following the death of Cecil Rhodes in 1902, Macmillan was in 1903 one of the first group of Rhodes Scholars at Oxford University in England.

Macmillan studied modern history at Merton College and graduated in 1906. He enrolled for the divinity course at the Free Church College in Aberdeen, and also studied divinity in Glasgow, but he did not proceed to the ministry. An important influence on Macmillan's later work was the semester that he spent at the Kaiser Wilhelm University in Berlin in 1910. He was fluent in German (as well as Dutch and Afrikaans) and attended the lectures of the ecclesiastical historian, Adolf von Harnack, the economic historian Gustav Schmoller, and the sociologist, Franz Oppenheimer. Macmillan joined the Fabian Society in 1911 and remained an evolutionary socialist or social democrat for most of his life, reverting to liberalism in old age.

== Career in South Africa ==
Macmillan returned to South Africa in 1911 to become a lecturer in history and economics at Rhodes University College, Grahamstown, South Africa, where he remained until 1917, when he became the first professor of history at the Johannesburg School of Mines (later the University of the Witwatersrand).

While in Grahamstown, Macmillan did work on poverty among white South Africans. He was the only English-speaking delegate at the Dutch Reformed Church congress on White Poverty, which was held at Cradock, Eastern Cape in 1916. Macmillan's first published work appeared anonymously as a pamphlet, Sanitary Reform for Grahamstown in 1915. This was followed in the same year by Economic Conditions in a Non-industrial South African Town. In 1918, Macmillan did substantial fieldwork on white poverty in rural areas, resulting in lectures and a book, The South African Agrarian Problem and its Historical Development, published in Johannesburg in 1919.

In 1920, the family of Dr John Philip entrusted Macmillan with his papers. Philip was the superintendent of the London Missionary Society in South Africa in the first half of the 19th century. In the following decade, Macmillan produced two important books, The Cape Colour Question (1927) and Bantu, Boer and Briton: The Making of the South African Native Problem. These books rewrote the history of South Africa in the first half of the nineteenth century, introducing a new emphasis on the history of South Africa as the history of all its people. The third volume of a trilogy, Complex South Africa (1930), brought together his early work on white poverty with work done in the 1920s on African poverty, including his work on the economics of the reserves, and his 'sample survey' of the Herschel district in Eastern Cape.

Macmillan was one of the first people to articulate a vision of South Africa as a single society. This view brought him into conflict with the segregationist government of the day as well as with liberal segregationists. He became chairman of the Johannesburg Joint Council of Europeans and Natives and was involved in 1932 with public clashes with the ministers of Native Affairs and of Justice – the latter was Oswald Pirow. After the University of Witwatersrand sought to gag Macmillan, he went on sabbatical leave at the end of 1932, but he did not return to the university. He resigned in September 1933.

== Work on Colonial Africa and the West Indies ==
After the completion of his work on Dr John Philip in 1929, Macmillan began traveling in Central, East, and West Africa. At this time, he began work on issues of governance in Colonial Africa. He published this work as Africa Emergent in 1938. Macmillan was a major critic of colonial rule and an advocate of a gradual democratisation of colonial rule through the introduction of representative, as opposed to 'traditional', systems of local government. He was at the same time critical of the colonial doctrine of financial self-sufficiency and became an advocate of aid. Macmillan had travelled to the United States and the West Indies in 1934–5 and was shocked by the neglect of the West Indian islands. His critique of colonial rule in these territories was published as Warning from the West Indies in 1936 - it was republished as a Penguin special in 1938.

Following his return to the United Kingdom in 1932, Macmillan was unable to secure academic employment and remained self-employed until after the outbreak of World War II. He was, however, active in a number of pressure groups including the Friends of Africa, the Anti-Slavery Society, the British Labour Party's committee on Imperial Questions, and with the Trades Union Congress.

== Wartime work ==
After the outbreak of the Second World War he became a member of the Colonial Office Advisory Committee on Education and was a member of the Channon sub-committee on Higher Education. This drew up the guidelines for the postwar expansion of university education in Africa and the West Indies. He was also a signatory of the report on Mass Education which recommended the extension of primary and adult education in the colonies. From 1941 to 1943 he worked as director of Empire Intelligence for the BBC. In that capacity, Macmillan helped lay the foundations of the World and Africa Services of the BBC.

From 1943 to 1946 Macmillan was Senior Representative of the British Council in West Africa. He was based at Accra in the Gold Coast (now Ghana), but was also responsible for the inauguration of the council's work in Nigeria, Sierra Leone and the Gambia, including libraries and scholarship schemes.

== Postwar career ==
After the war, the postwar Labour government supported Macmillan's appointment as director of Colonial Studies at the University of St Andrews in Scotland. He returned to South Africa for the first time in seventeen years to give the Hoernle Memorial lecture in Durban in 1949. In 1951 the British government sent Macmillan on a three-man observer mission to Bechuanaland to advise on the status of Tshekedi Khama who had been excluded from the Bamangwato Reserve in the wake of the crisis over the marriage of Seretse and Ruth Khama.

Macmillan retired from St Andrews in 1954 and served for one year, 1954–5, as acting professor of history at the University of the West Indies in Jamaica. After his wartime experience in West Africa, he became skeptical about the claims of African Nationalism and was broadly supportive of the Federation of Rhodesia and Nyasaland, which the British government saw as a bulwark against the spread of Afrikaner nationalism from the south and African nationalism from the north.

== Family ==
He married firstly in 1913 Jean Sutherland, daughter of the Reverend John Sutherland of Uitenhague, South Africa, and, secondly, Mona Constance Mary Tweedie, daughter of Admiral Sir Hugh Tweedie, KCB, and his wife, Constance Marion (Mona) Crossman. He acknowledged the help of his first wife in the production of his first four books and of his second wife in the production of his later works. He met Mona Tweedie in 1931 and was married to her after divorce from his first wife in 1936. Mona Macmillan became an author in her own right, publishing Introducing East Africa in 1952, The Land of Look Behind: A Study of Jamaica (1957), Mediator and Moderator: The life of Sir Henry Barkly (1969), Champion of Africa: W.M. Macmillan, the second phase (1985), and a memoir, Mona's Story, posthumously, in 2008. She also edited the writings of the controversial Zambian archbishop, Emmanuel Milingo, and, with her daughter, Catriona, the correspondence of the Pratt family. She died in Oxfordshire in 2003 at the age of 95. There were no children from the first marriage and four children from the second marriage.

His elder son, the art historian and writer Duncan Macmillan FRSA FRSE HRSA, is emeritus Professor of Art History at the University of Edinburgh and was curator of the university's Talbot Rice Gallery. He is the author of books including Scottish Art, 1460-2000, Painting in Scotland: The Golden Age, Painting in Scotland in the Twentieth Century and Scotland's Shrine: The Scottish National War Memorial. He is the art critic of The Scotsman.

His younger son, Hugh Macmillan, has worked at universities in Swaziland, Zambia and South Africa, and is currently a research associate at the African Studies Centre, University of Oxford. He is the author of The Lusaka Years: The ANC in Exile in Zambia, 1963–94 (2013); An African Trading Empire: The story of Susman Brothers & Wulfsohn (2005), and of Zion in Africa: The Jews of Zambia (1999, with Frank Shapiro). He has also written pocket biographies of Chris Hani, Jack Simons and Oliver Tambo and is the co-editor with Shula Marks of Africa and Empire: W.M. Macmillan, historian and social critic (1989). His elder daughter, Lindsay, married Alexander Arthur Dow, and had a career as a teacher in Zambia and Scotland. His younger daughter, Catriona, married Lieutenant Colonel Alistair Miller OBE, Queen's Royal Irish Hussars, and subsequently had a career as a hotelier in Dorset. She edited, with her mother, Exiles of Empire, the nineteenth century correspondence of the Pratt family between Scotland, India and Australia.

== Honours ==
Macmillan was awarded honorary degrees of D.Litt. by Oxford University in 1957, University of Natal in 1962, and Edinburgh University in 1974.

== Works ==
- The South African Agrarian Problem and its Historical Development, CNA, Johannesburg, 1919
- The Cape Colour Question, Faber & Gwyer, London, 1927
- Bantu, Boer, and Briton: The Making of the South African Native Problem, Faber & Faber, London, 1929 and Oxford University Press, 1963
- Complex South Africa, Faber & Faber, 1930
- Warning from the West Indies: A tract for Africa and the Empire. Faber & Faber, 1936 and Penguin 1938
- Europe and West Africa (with Meek and Hussey), Cambridge University Press, 1940
- Democratise the Empire A policy of colonial reform. Kegan Paul, London, 1941
- Africa Emergent. Faber & Faber, London, 1938 and Penguin 1949
- Road to Self-Rule: A Study in Colonial Evolution. ISBN 0-8369-5608-7
- My South African Years. David Philip, Cape Town, 1975. ISBN 0-949968-42-0
