= Edwin Morgan (poet) =

Scottish poet and essayist (1920–2010)

Edwin Morgan OBE FRSE
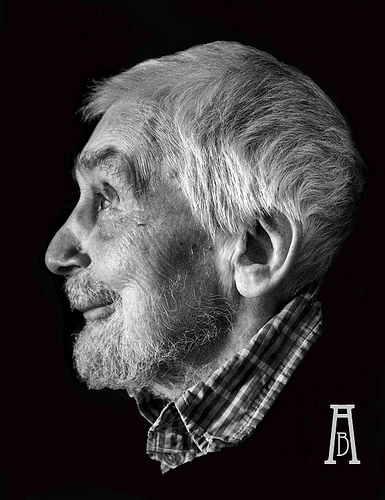

Makar
- In office 16 February 2004 – 19 August 2010
- Preceded by: Position established
- Succeeded by: Liz Lochhead

Personal details
- Born: 27 April 1920 Glasgow, Scotland
- Died: 19 August 2010 (aged 90) Glasgow, Scotland
- Education: University of Glasgow
- Occupation: Professor, poet
- Website: edwinmorgantrust.com

Edwin George Morgan OBE FRSE (27 April 1920 – 19 August 2010) was a Scottish poet and translator associated with the Scottish Renaissance. He is widely recognised as one of the foremost Scottish poets of the 20th century. In 1999, Morgan was made the first Glasgow Poet Laureate. In 2004, he was named as the first Makar or National Poet for Scotland.

== Life and career ==
Morgan was born in Glasgow and grew up in Rutherglen. His parents were Presbyterian. He convinced his parents to finance his membership of several book clubs in Glasgow. The Faber Book of Modern Verse (1936) was a "revelation" to him, he later said.

He entered the University of Glasgow in 1937. He studied French and Russian, while self-educating in "a good bit of Italian and German" as well. After interrupting his studies to serve in World War II as a non-combatant conscientious objector with the Royal Army Medical Corps, Morgan graduated in 1947 and became a lecturer at the university. He worked there until his retirement as a full professor in 1980.

Morgan described 'CHANGE RULES!' as 'the supreme graffito', whose liberating double-take suggests both a lifelong commitment to formal experimentation and his radically democratic left-wing political perspectives. From traditional sonnet to blank verse, from epic seriousness to camp and ludic nonsense; and whether engaged in time-travelling space fantasies or exploring contemporary developments in physics and technology, the range of Morgan's voices is a defining attribute.

He first expressed his identity as a gay man in Nothing Not Giving Messages: Reflections on his Work and Life (1990). He had written many famous love poems, among them "Strawberries" and "The Unspoken", in which the love object was not gendered; this was partly because of legal problems at the time but also out of a desire to universalise them, as he made clear in an interview with Marshall Walker. At the opening of the Glasgow Gay and Lesbian Centre in 1995, he read a poem he had written for the occasion, and presented it to the centre as a gift.

In 2002, he became the patron of OurStory Scotland. At the opening of the Scottish Parliament building in Edinburgh on 9 October 2004, Liz Lochhead read a poem written for the occasion by Morgan, titled "Poem for the Opening of the Scottish Parliament". She was announced as Morgan's successor as Scots Makar in January 2011.

Near the end of his life, Morgan reached a new audience after collaborating with the Scottish band Idlewild on their album The Remote Part. In the closing moments of the album's final track "In Remote Part/ Scottish Fiction", he recites a poem, "Scottish Fiction", written specifically for the song.

In 2007, Morgan contributed two poems to the compilation Ballads of the Book, for which a range of Scottish writers created poems to be made into songs by Scottish musicians. Morgan's songs "The Good Years" and "The Weight of Years" were performed by Karine Polwart and Idlewild respectively.

Nobel Laureate Seamus Heaney "[paid] formal homage" during a 2005 visit.

In later life Morgan was cared for at a residential home as his health worsened. He published a collection in April 2010, months before his death, titled Dreams and Other Nightmares to mark his 90th birthday. Up until his death, he was the last survivor of the canonical 'Big Seven' (the others being Hugh MacDiarmid, Robert Garioch, Norman MacCaig, Iain Crichton Smith, George Mackay Brown, and Sorley MacLean).

On 19 August 2010, Morgan died of pneumonia in Glasgow, aged 90. The Scottish Poetry Library made the announcement in the morning. Tributes came from, among others, politicians Alex Salmond and Iain Gray, as well as Carol Ann Duffy, the UK Poet Laureate. In his will he left almost £1 million to the Scottish National Party. Morgan also left £45,000 to a number of friends, former colleagues and charity organisations and set aside another £1 million for the creation of the Edwin Morgan Poetry Award, an annual award scheme for young poets in Scotland. In 2012, The Edwin Morgan Trust was established to administer the Award which the poet wished to create from the earnings of his writing career. In April 2020 The Edwin Morgan Trust celebrated his life and work with a year long centenary programme.

== Poetry ==
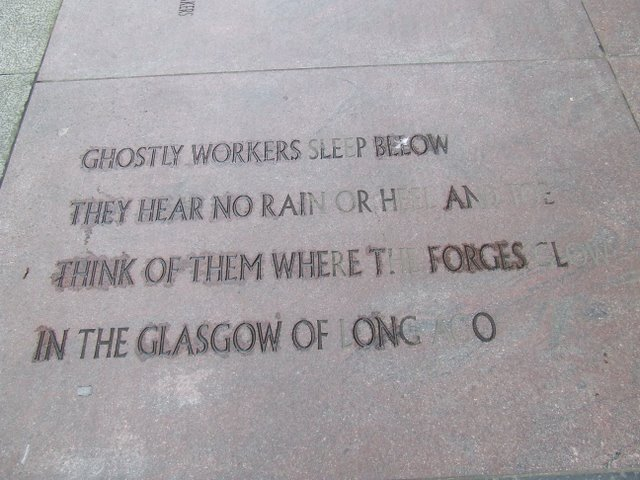
Poetry by Edwin Morgan inscribed on the pavement on Candleriggs, Glasgow.

Morgan worked in a wide range of forms and styles, from the sonnet to concrete poetry. His Collected Poems appeared in 1990. He has also translated from a wide range of languages, including Russian, Hungarian, French, Italian, Latin, Spanish, Portuguese, German and Old English (Beowulf). Many of these are collected in Rites of Passage. Selected Translations (1976). His 1952 translation of Beowulf has become a standard translation in America.

Morgan was also influenced by the American Beat poets, with their simple, accessible ideas and language being prominent features in his work.

His poetry may be studied as a Scottish Text for National 5 English. Currently, if Edwin Morgan is studied at National 5, pupils study: "Strawberries" - a love poem; "In the Snackbar"; "Love" - a celebration of the power of love; "Death on Duke Street"; "Trio" – a tale about the power of friendship; "Glasgow Sonnet (I)" – a petrarchan sonnet about poverty.

In 1968 Morgan wrote "Starlings in George Square". This poem could be read as a comment on society's reluctance to accept the integration of different races. Other people have also considered it to be about the Russian Revolution in which "Starling" could be a reference to "Stalin".

Other notable poems and works include:

- "The Death of Marilyn Monroe" (1962) – an outpouring of emotion and a social criticism after the death of prominent actress, Marilyn Monroe
- "King Billy" (1968) – flashback of the gang warfare in Glasgow led by Billy Fullerton in the 1930s.
- "Glasgow 5 March 1971" – robbery by two youths by pushing an unsuspecting couple through a shop window on Sauchiehall Street
- "Columba" – Libretto for the opera "Columba" by Kenneth Leighton (1975–77)
- "In the Snackbar" – concise description of an encounter with a disabled pensioner in a Glasgow café.
- "A Good Year for Death" (26 September 1977) – a description of five famous people from the world of popular culture who died in 1977
- "Poem for the Opening of the Scottish Parliament" – which was read by Liz Lochhead at the opening ceremony because he was too ill to read it in person. (9 October 2004)

== Published work ==
=== Books ===
- Dies Irae, 1952 – first published in Poems of Thirty Years, Carcanet New Press, 1982
- Beowulf: A Verse Translation into Modern English, Hand and Flower Press, 1952
- The Vision of Cathkin Braes and Other Poems, William MacLellan, 1952
- The Cape of Good Hope (limited edition), Pound Press, 1955
- Poems from Eugenio Montale (translator), School of Art, University of Reading, 1959
- Sovpoems: Brecht, Neruda, Pasternak, Tsvetayeva, Mayakovsky, Martynov, Yevtushenko (translator), Migrant Press, 1961
- Collins Albatross Book of Longer Poems (editor), Collins, 1963
- Starryveldt, Eugen Gomringer Press, 1965
- Emergent Poems, Hansjörg Mayer, 1967
- Gnomes, Akros publications, 1968
- The Second Life, Edinburgh University Press, 1968
- Selected Poems of Sándor Weöres and Selected Poems of Ferenc Juhász (translator and introduction for Sándor Weöres), Penguin, 1970
- The Horseman's Word: Concrete Poems, Akros, 1970
- Twelve Songs, Castlelaw Press, 1970
- Glasgow Sonnets, Castlelaw Press, 1972
- Instamatic Poems, Ian McKelvie, 1972
- Wi the haill voice: 25 poems by Vladimir Mayakovsky (translator and glossary), Carcanet, 1972
- From Glasgow to Saturn, Carcanet, 1973
- Nuspeak8: Being a Visual Poem by Edwin Morgan, Scottish Arts Council, 1973
- The Whittrick: a Poem in Eight Dialogues, Akros, 1973
- Essays, Carcanet, 1974
- Fifty Renascence Love-Poems (translator), Whiteknights Press, 1975
- Rites of Passage (translator), 1976
- Edwin Morgan: an interview by Marshall Walker, Akros, 1977
- The New Divan, 1977
- Selected poems by August Graf von Platen-Hallermünde (translator), Castlelaw Press, 1978
- Star Gate: Science Fiction Poems, Third Eye Centre, 1979
- Scottish Satirical Verse (compiler), Carcanet, 1980
- Grendel, Mariscat, 1982
- Poems of Thirty Years, Carcanet New Press, 1982
- The Apple-Tree (modern version of a medieval Dutch play), Third Eye Centre, 1982
- Takes/Grafts, Mariscat, 1983
- Sonnets from Scotland, Mariscat, 1984
- Selected Poems, 1985
- From the Video Box, Mariscat, 1986
- Newspoems, Wacy, 1987
- Tales from Limerick Zoo (illustrated by David Neilson), Mariscat, 1988
- Themes on a Variation, 1988
- Collected Poems (republished 1996 with index), 1990
- Crossing the Border: Essays on Scottish Literature, 1990
- Nothing Not Giving Messages: Reflections on his Work and Life (edited by Hamish Whyte), Polygon, 1990
- Hold Hands Among the Atoms: 70 Poems, Mariscat, 1991
- Edmond Rostand's Cyrano de Bergerac: A New Verse Translation (translator), 1992
- Fragments by József Attila (translator), Morning Star Publications, 1992
- MacCaig, Morgan, Lochhead: Three Scottish Poets (edited and introduced by Roderick Watson), Canongate, 1992
- Cecilia Vicuña:PALABRARmas/WURDWAPPINschaw, Morning Star Publications, 1994
- Sweeping Out the Dark, 1994
- Long Poems – But How Long? (W. D. Thomas Memorial Lecture), University of Wales, Swansea, 1995
- Collected Translations, 1996
- St. Columba: The Maker on High (translator), Mariscat, 1997
- Virtual and Other Realities, 1997
- Christopher Marlowe's Dr Faustus (a new version), Canongate, 1999
- Demon, Mariscat, 1999
- A.D.: A Trilogy of Plays on the Life of Jesus, Carcanet, 2000
- Jean Racine: Phaedra (translation of Phèdre), 2000 (Oxford-Weidenfeld Translation Prize)
- New Selected Poems, 2000
- Attila József: Sixty Poems (translator), Mariscat, 2001
- Cathures, 2002
- Love and a Life: 50 Poems by Edwin Morgan, Mariscat, 2003
- The Battle of Bannockburn (translator), SPL in association with Akros and Mariscat, 2004
- Tales from Baron Munchausen, Mariscat, 2005
- The Play of Gilgamesh, 2005
- Thirteen Ways of Looking at Rillie, Enitharmon, 2006
- A Book of Lives, 2007

=== Articles ===
- The Politics of Poetry, review of Yeats, Eliot, Pound and the Politics of Poetry by Cairns Craig, in Hearn, Sheila G. (ed.), Cencrastus No. 12, Spring 1983, p. 44, ISSN 0264-0856
- Novy Mir and the Stalinist Whirlwind, a review of Within the Whirlwind by Eugenia Ginsburg and "Novy Mir": A Case Study in the Politics of Literature 1952 - 1958 by Edith Rogovin Frankel (ed.), in Hearn, Sheila G. (ed.), Cencrastus No. 14, Autumn 1983, p. 54, ISSN 0264-0856

== Reviews ==
- Hearn, Sheila G. (1980), review of Edwin Morgan (ed.), Scottish Satirical Verse, in Cencrastus No. 4, Winter 1980–81, p. 49, ISSN 0264-0856

== Awards and honours ==
- 1972 PEN Memorial Medal (Hungary)
- 1982 Birthday Honours OBE
- 1983 Saltire Society Scottish Book of the Year Award for Poems of Thirty Years
- 1985 Soros Translation Award (New York)
- 1998 Stakis Prize for Scottish Writer of the Year for Virtual and Other Realities
- 2000 Queen's Gold Medal for Poetry
- 2001 Oxford-Weidenfeld Translation Prize for Jean Racine: Phaedra
- 2002 The Saltire Society's Andrew Fletcher of Saltoun award for notable service to Scotland
- 2003 Jackie Forster Memorial Award for Culture
- 2003 Lifetime Achievement Award for Literature, from the Saltire Society and the Scottish Arts Council
- 2007 Shortlisted for T. S. Eliot Prize for A Book of Lives.
- 2008 Scottish Arts Council Book of the Year Award
