= Bill Findlay (writer) =

Scottish writer and dramatist (1947–2005)

- Born: 11 June 1947; Culross, Fife, Scotland
- Died: 15 May 2005; Scotland
- Occupation: Dramatist
- Writing career
- Language: Scots
- Notable work: The Guid Sisters (1980)
- Movements: Scottish Theatre, Scots Language

Bill Findlay (11 June 1947 – 15 May 2005) was a Scottish writer, dramatist and theatre academic. As a translator, editor, critic and advocate, he made an important contribution to Scottish theatre. He worked as a lecturer in the School of Drama at Edinburgh's Queen Margaret University and was a founder editor and regular contributor to the Scottish and international literature, arts and affairs magazine, Cencrastus.

Born in Culross in Fife, Findlay attended Dunfermline High School and left home in 1965 to work as a civil servant in London. He returned to Scotland in 1970 to attend Newbattle Abbey College, spending two years there before going on to Stirling University, where he graduated with a first class honours degree in English in 1976. His career in writing began when he won the McCash prize for poetry.

For the first issue of Cencrastus, in 1979, Findlay interviewed Margaret Atwood on the relationship of Canadian writers and writing to the 'Imperial Cultures' of America and Britain.

== Drama ==
Theatre programme for the 2012 production of The Guid Sisters

In 1980, Findlay and Martin Bowman translated Michel Tremblay's Les Belles Sœurs into contemporary Scots as The Guid Sisters. Michael Boyd produced their adaptation for Glasgow's Tron Theatre in 1989 and it went on to play in Toronto in 1990 and at the Centaur Theatre in Montreal in 1992 as part of the British contribution to the city's 350th anniversary celebrations. It was revived by the National Theatre of Scotland and the Royal Lyceum Theatre, Edinburgh, in 2012. In his review of the play, Andrew Latimer wrote "When Martin Bowman and Bill Findlay first translated Tremblay's text into fierce Glasgow-Scots, with all the care and political attentiveness required to succeed, something vibrant, globally resonant and deeply sociological was unlocked. While still situated in the realm of francophone Canada, the language couldn't be closer to our own doorstep."

In the years following the première of The Guid Sisters, Bowman and Findlay translated seven other Tremblay plays into Scots: Hosanna, The Real Wurld? (Tron, 1991); The House Among the Stars (Traverse Theatre and Perth Theatre, 1992); Forever Yours, Marie-Lou (LadderMan Productions for the Tron, 1994); Albertine in Five Times (Clyde Unity, 1998); Solemn Mass for a Full Moon in Summer (Traverse Theatre and the Barbican, 2000); and If Only... (Royal Lyceum Theatre, 2003). The Tron Theatre took The Real Wurld? to the Stony Brook International Theatre Festival on Long Island, New York in 1991. John Corbett has described this body of work as making an 'honorable addition' to a long tradition of translating literature in a variety of languages into Scots. Jennifer Harvie has explored the cultural and political ramifications of the intercultural exchange represented by the translation of Tremblay's work in joual into Scots.

Findlay and Bowman translated other works by Quebecois playwrights including Jeanne-Mance Delisle's The Reel of the Hanged Man (Stellar Quines, 2000). In November 2005, Michel-Marc Bouchard's The Skelfs was given a rehearsed reading at the Traverse Theatre as a memorial tribute to Findlay. On his own, Findlay undertook a number of Scots translations and adaptations, including Gerhart Hauptmann's The Weavers (Dundee Rep, 1997), Pavel Kohout's Fire in the Basement (Communicado, 1998), Teresa Lubkiewicz's Werewolves (Theatre Archipelago, 1999) and Raymond Cousse's Bairn's Brothers (Mull Little Theatre, 2000),.

Findlay was awarded a PhD in 2000 and held a readership in the School of Drama and Creative Industries at Queen Margaret University College, Edinburgh. He edited and contributed the first chapter to A History of Scottish Theatre (1998). He also edited Scots Plays of the Seventies (2001), Frae Ither Tongues: Essays on Modern Translations into Scots (2004), and (with John Corbett) Serving Twa Maisters: An Anthology of Scots Translations of Classic Plays (2005).

After his death in 2005, Queen Margaret University School of Drama established a Bill Findlay Fellowship in Stage Translation in his memory.

In June 2023, the Association for Scottish Literature published two volumes of plays by Michel Tremblay, translated into Scots by Martin Bowman and Bill Findlay.

== Bibliography ==
- Interview with Margaret Atwood, in Cencrastus No. 1, Autumn 1979, pp. 2 – 6, ISSN 0264-0856
- Clydebuilt, reviews of 7:84 Theatre Company, Scotland, Clydebuilt: A Season of Scottish Popular Theatre from the '20s, '30s and '40s; Joe Corrie, In Time o' Strife; and Ena Lamont Stewart, Men Should Weep, in Hearn, Sheila G. (ed.), Cencrastus No. 10, Autumn 1982, p. 39, ISSN 0264-0856
- The Articulate Scott, review of The Language of Walter Scott by Graham Tulloch, in Hearn, Sheila G. (ed.), Cencrastus No. 10, Autumn 1982, pp. 40 & 41, ISSN 0264-0856
- Celtic Omphalos, a review of Translations by Brian Friel, in Hearn, Sheila G. (ed.), Cencrastus No. 12, Spring 1983, pp. 43 & 44, ISSN 0264-0856
- Interview with John Updike, in Cencrastus No. 15, New Year 1984, pp. 30 – 36, ISSN 0264-0856
- Order, Order!, a review of Order and Space and Society: Architectural Form and its Context in the Scottish Enlightenment edited by Thomas A. Markus, in Hearn, Sheila G. (ed.), Cencrastus No. 16, Spring 1984, pp. 49 & 50, ISSN 0264-0856
- At the Shrine of the Thistle, an interview with Eric Marwick, in Lawson, Alan (ed.), Radical Scotland Aug/Sept 1985, pp. 30 & 31, ISSN 0262-6993
- 7:84's Scottish Popular Play Series, in Lawson, Alan (ed.), Radical Scotland Oct/Nov 1985, pp. 30 & 31, ISSN 0262-6993
- Fun in the Gorbals, in Lawson, Alan (ed.), Radical Scotland Dec/Jan 1986, p. 31, ISSN 0262-6993
- Diaskeuasts of the Omnific Word, in Parker, Geoff (ed.), Cencrastus No. 23, June - August 1986, pp. 48 – 52, ISSN 0264-0856
- Elegiac Action, reviews of Freeman, F.W. (1984), Robert Fergusson and the Scots Humanist Compromise; Fergusson, Robert, Auld Reekie, The Scream Press, 1984; and McClure, J. Derick (ed.) (1984), Scotland and the Lowland Tongue, in Parker, Geoff (ed.), Cencrastus No. 23, June - August 1986, pp. 57 – 60, ISSN 0264-0856
- Michel Tremblay, The Guid-Sisters, (Les Belles Sœurs translated into Scots by Bill Findlay and Martin Bowman), Exile Editions, 1988, ISBN 9780920428177
- Interview with Michel Tremblay, in Cencrastus No. 32, New Year 1989, pp. 30 – 33, ISSN 0264-0856
- Talking in Tongues: Scottish Translations 1970 - 1995, in Stevenson, Randall and Wallace, Gavin (eds.), Scottish Theatre since the Seventies, pp. 186 – 197, Edinburgh University Press, 1996, ISBN 0-7486-0781-1
- A History of Scottish Theatre,(Editor), Polygon, 1998, ISBN 9780748662203
- Scots Plays of the Seventies, (Editor), Scottish Cultural Press, 2001, ISBN 9781840170283
- Frae Ither Tongues: Essays on Modern Translations into Scots, Multilingual Matters Limited, 2004, ISBN 9781847695574
- "The Founding of a Modern Tradition: Robert Kemp's Scots translations of Molière at the Gateway", in Brown, Ian (ed.) (2004), Journey's Beginning: the Gateway Theatre Building and Company, 1884 - 1965, Intellect Ltd., Bristol, ISBN 978-1841501086
- (with John Corbett) Serving Twa Maisters: An Anthology of Scots Translations of Classic Plays, Association for Scottish Literary Studies, 2005, ISBN 9780948877643
- "Performances and Plays", in Clancy, Thomas Owen & Pittock, Murray (eds.) (2007), The Edinburgh History of Scottish Literature, Volume 1: From Columba to the Union (until 1707), Edinburgh University Press, ISBN 9780748616152
- Scottish People's Theatre: Plays by Glasgow Unity Writers, (Editor), Association for Scottish Literary Studies, 2008, ISBN 9780948877780
- Michel Tremblay, Solemn Mass for a Full Moon in Summer, (Messe solennelle pour une pleine lune d'été translated into Scots by Bill Findlay and Martin Bowman), 2017, Nick Hern Books, ISBN 9781780018461
