= Valerie Gillies =

Canadian-born poet (born 1948)

- Born: 1948 (age 77–78); Alberta, Canada
- Occupations: Poet, radio and television writer
- Writing career
- Notable works: Tweed Journey; Each Bright Eye; The Ringing Rock; The Lightning Tree
- Website: valeriegillies.com

Valerie Gillies (born 1948) is a Canadian-born poet who grew up in Scotland. She was the second Edinburgh Makar (Edinburgh's poet laureate) from 2005 to 2008. Gillies has written for literary and arts reviews, the theatre and BBC radio and television, and has worked with visual artists and musicians. She has also taught creative writing extensively.

== Life and education ==
Gillies was born in Alberta, Canada, but grew up in southern Scotland. She completed her undergraduate and postgraduate degrees at the University of Edinburgh. She also studied traditional Sanskrit dramas in Mysore, India.

She lives in Edinburgh and is married to William Gillies, a Celtic scholar, with whom she has had three children: two daughters and a son.

== Career ==
As well as publishing collections of poetry and appearing in various Faber and Penguin anthologies. In 1992, Gillies was appointed Writer in Residence for Midlothian and East Lothian in a scheme promoted by the two districts that was supported by the Scottish Arts Council. Her other residencies include The University of Edinburgh, Edinburgh College of Art, various district libraries and a large psychiatric hospital.

She was poet laureate ad vitam of the Trimontium Trust in 2002 and the second Edinburgh Makar (Edinburgh's poet laureate) from 2005 to 2008.

In 2005, Gillies received a Creative Scotland Award to write The Spring Teller (2009), a book of poems inspired by Scotland's wells and springs.

She spent 2009–10 and 2013–14 researching and writing as an associate of the Faculty of Arts and Sciences at Harvard University.

== Bibliography ==
=== Collections of poetry ===
- The Cream of the Well: New and Selected Poems (2015)
- The Spring Teller, Luath (2009)
- The Lightning Tree, Polygon (2002)
- Men and Beasts, with photographer Rebecca Marr, Luath Press (non-fiction and poetry) (2000)
- St Kilda Waulking Song, artist's book with Will Maclean, Morning Star (1998)
- The Ringing Rock, Scottish Cultural Press (1995)
- Poeti della Scozia Contemporanea, Supernova, Venezia [translation] (1992)
- The Jordanstone Folio, with 12 artists, Tay Press (1990)
- The Chanter's Tune, Canongate (1990)
- The Tweed Journey, Canongate (1989)
- Leopardi: A Scottis Quair, Edinburgh University Press [translation] (1987)
- Bed of Stone, Canongate (1984)
- Each Bright Eye, Canongate (1977)
- Poetry Introduction 3, Faber (1975)
- Trio, New Rivers Press, New York (1971)

=== Contributions to anthologies, selected ===
- The New Minstrels of the Scottish Borders, Deerpark Press (2006)
- Tweed Rivers, Platform Press and Luath Press (2005)
- Scottish Literature in the Twentieth Century, Scottish Cultural Press (2002)
- The Faber Book of Twentieth Century Scottish Poetry, Faber (2002)
- Love for Love, Pocketbooks (2000)
- Atoms of Delight, Pocketbooks (2000)
- The Jewel Box CD, Scottish Poetry Library (2000)
- Homage to the Carmina Gadelica, Morning Star (1998)
