= Makar (National Poet for Scotland) =

Scottish national poet

- National Poet for Scotland
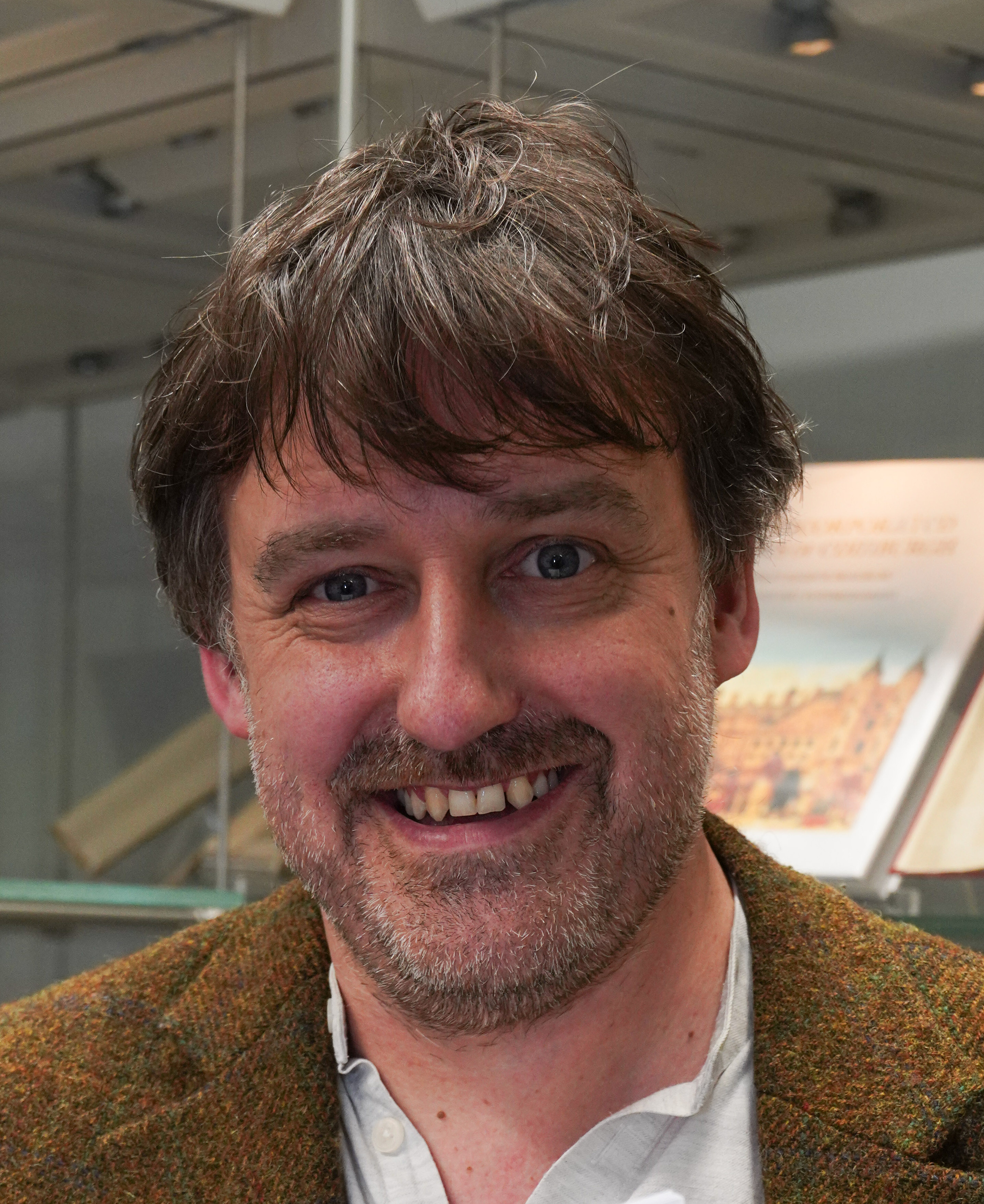
- Incumbent; Pàdraig MacAoidh since 2 December 2024
- Reports to: Scottish Government; Scottish Parliament
- Nominator: Scottish Government
- Appointer: First Minister
- Term length: 3 years, non–renewable
- Formation: February 2004
- First holder: Edwin Morgan

The Makar is the national poet of Scotland, an office which was established in February 2004 by the Scottish Government and supported by Creative Scotland. The incumbent Makar serves a maximum term of three years which is non–renewable, and has overall responsibility for the promotion of literacy, poetry and writing across the country, as well as producing annual reports for both the Scottish Government and Scottish Parliament.

The current Makar is Pàdraig MacAoidh, who was appointed in December 2024 by first minister John Swinney. Holders of the post are appointed by the Scottish Government and supported by the Scottish Poetry Library, which celebrated its 40th anniversary in 2024.

== History ==
The position of Makar, also known in English as "National Poet for Scotland", was created in February 2004 by the Scottish Government under then first minister Jack McConnell. The government was supported by Creative Scotland in the establishment of the position. Speaking about the creation of the position, first minister Jack McConnell claimed that "it is vitally important that we recognise the significant contribution of poetry to the culture of Scotland". McConnell also emphasised that the role of Makar "will symbolise the success and of Scottish poets in the past and the potential of Scottish poetry in the future", adding his ambitions for the role was to "inspire young Scots to enjoy, and indeed to write, poetry".

Edwin Morgan was the inaugural holder of the role of Makar, appointed on 16 February 2004. Initially, Morgan was expected to hold the position for a maximum term of three years, however, was later extended to a "lifetime appointment". Following Morgan's death in 2010, he was succeeded by Liz Lochhead as Makar, who was appointed in January 2011 by first minister Alex Salmond. Additionally, following Morgan's death and the appointment of Lochhead, the position of Makar was changed to carry a maximum term of five years without renewal, with the overall ambition of "advancing the use of poetry in the lives of the people of Scotland". Jackie Kay succeeded Lochhead on 15 March 2016 following her appointment by first minister Nicola Sturgeon, and held the position until 14 March 2021 when she was succeeded in the role by Kathleen Jamie, appointed in August 2021. Jamie held the position of Makar until 2 December 2024, with Pàdraig MacAoidh being appointed by first minister John Swinney, making him the first Scottish Gaelic poet and writer to hold the position of Makar.

== Role and appointment ==
The post is appointed by the Scottish Government in an unregulated appointment. The Scottish Poetry Library provides support to the post including supporting the Makar's engagement programme and communications. Liz Lochhead and Jackie Kay were appointed by a panel made up of the then living First Ministers, from a shortlist created by experts from the poetry library.

The Makar's responsibilities include taking a leadership role in promoting poetry nationally, producing poems relating to significant national events, encouraging the reading and writing of poetry, particularly by young people, reading their poems publicly, at public events, and commenting publicly on poetry, the arts and any and all related matters in Scotland and internationally and preparing a report on their experience in the role each year.

In 2004, Makar Edwin Morgan wrote a piece for the official opening of the Scottish Parliament Building in Edinburgh.

With the appointment of Pàdraig MacAoidh (Peter Mackay) in 2024, the Scottish Government convened an expert panel representing Scotland's literary sector to consider nominations for the next Makar and agree upon a recommendation to put to the First Minister The panel members were:

- Anna Feintuck, Team Leader, Access, Arts and Participation Team, Culture & Historic Environment Division, Scottish Government, (chair)
- Henry Bell, Editor, Gutter
- Dr David Goldie, President, Association for Scottish Literature
- Peggy Hughes, Director, National Centre for Writing, Norwich
- Marc Lambert, Chief Executive, Scottish Book Trust
- Duncan Lockerbie, Director, Tapsalteerie/Stewed Rhubarb Press
- Marjorie Lotfi, Director, Open Book
- Jill Mackintosh, Head Librarian, Scottish Poetry Library
- Harriet Macmillan, Literature Officer, Creative Scotland
- Dr Robyn Marsack, Independent Adviser
- Niall O’Gallagher, Gaelic Poet and Broadcaster
- Amina Shah, National Librarian and Chief Executive, National Library of Scotland
- Ryan van Winkle, Director, Stanza, Scotland's International Poetry Festival
- Mark Wringe, Senior Lecturer, Sabhal Mòr Ostaig, University of the Highlands and Islands

== List of Makars ==
- Edwin Morgan (2004–2010)
- Liz Lochhead (2011–2016)
- Jackie Kay (2016–2021)
- Kathleen Jamie (2021–2024)
- Pàdraig MacAoidh (2024–present)

== See also ==
- Makar
- National poet
- Poet laureate
