= Kathleen Jamie =

Scottish poet and essayist

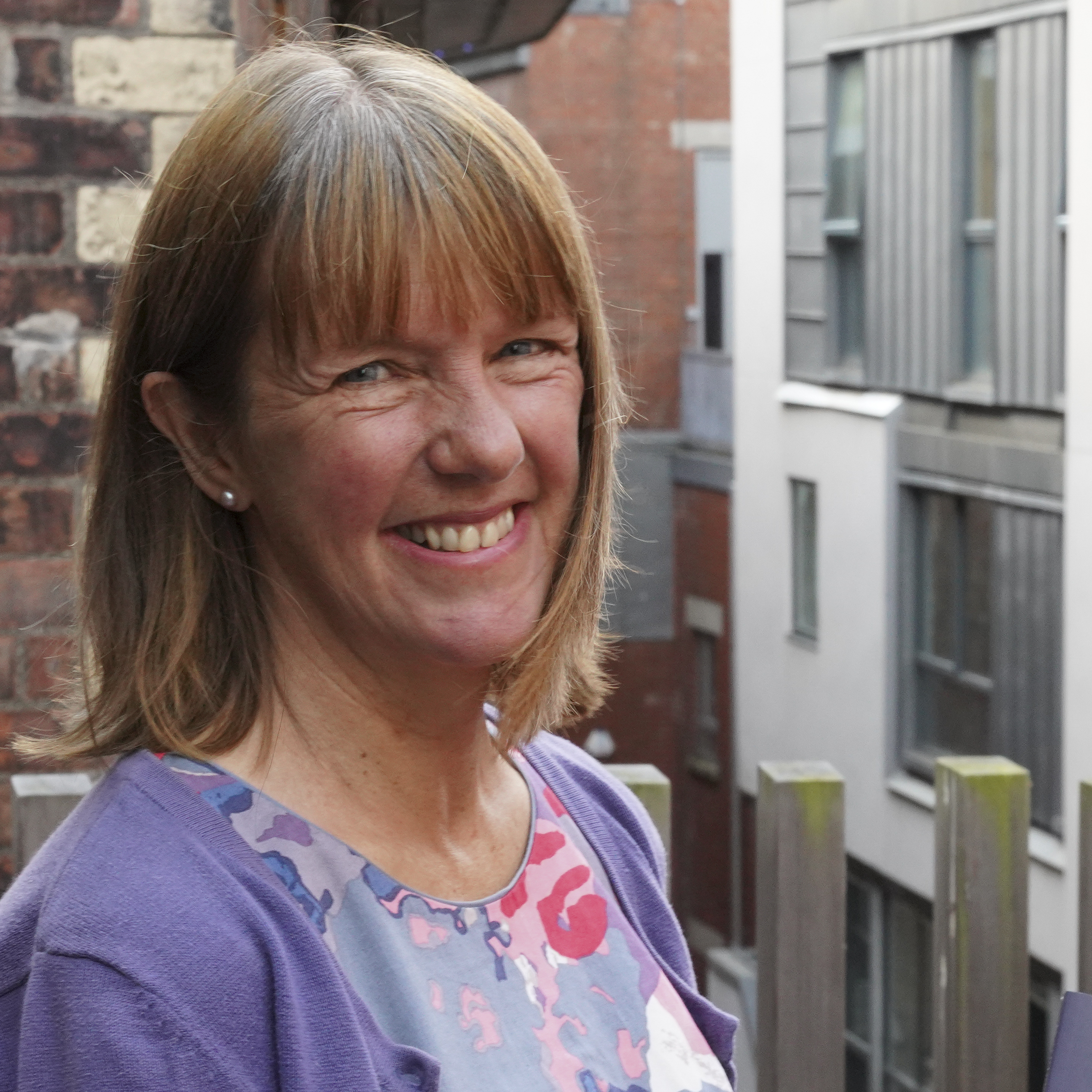
- Kathleen Jamie

Makar
- In office 18 August 2021 – 2 December 2024
- Preceded by: Jackie Kay
- Succeeded by: Pàdraig MacAoidh

Personal details
- Born: 13 May 1962 (age 64) Scotland
- Education: University of Edinburgh
- Occupation: Poet, essayist
- Awards: Forward Poetry Prize; Scottish Book of the Year; Eric Gregory Award

Kathleen Jamie FRSL FRSE (born 13 May 1962) is a Scottish poet and essayist. In 2021 she became Scotland's fourth Makar.

== Life and work ==
Kathleen Jamie is a poet and essayist. Raised in Currie, near Edinburgh, she attended Currie High School and studied philosophy at the University of Edinburgh, publishing her first poems as an undergraduate. Her writing is rooted in Scottish landscape and culture, and ranges through travel, women's issues, archaeology and visual art. She writes in English and occasionally in Scots.

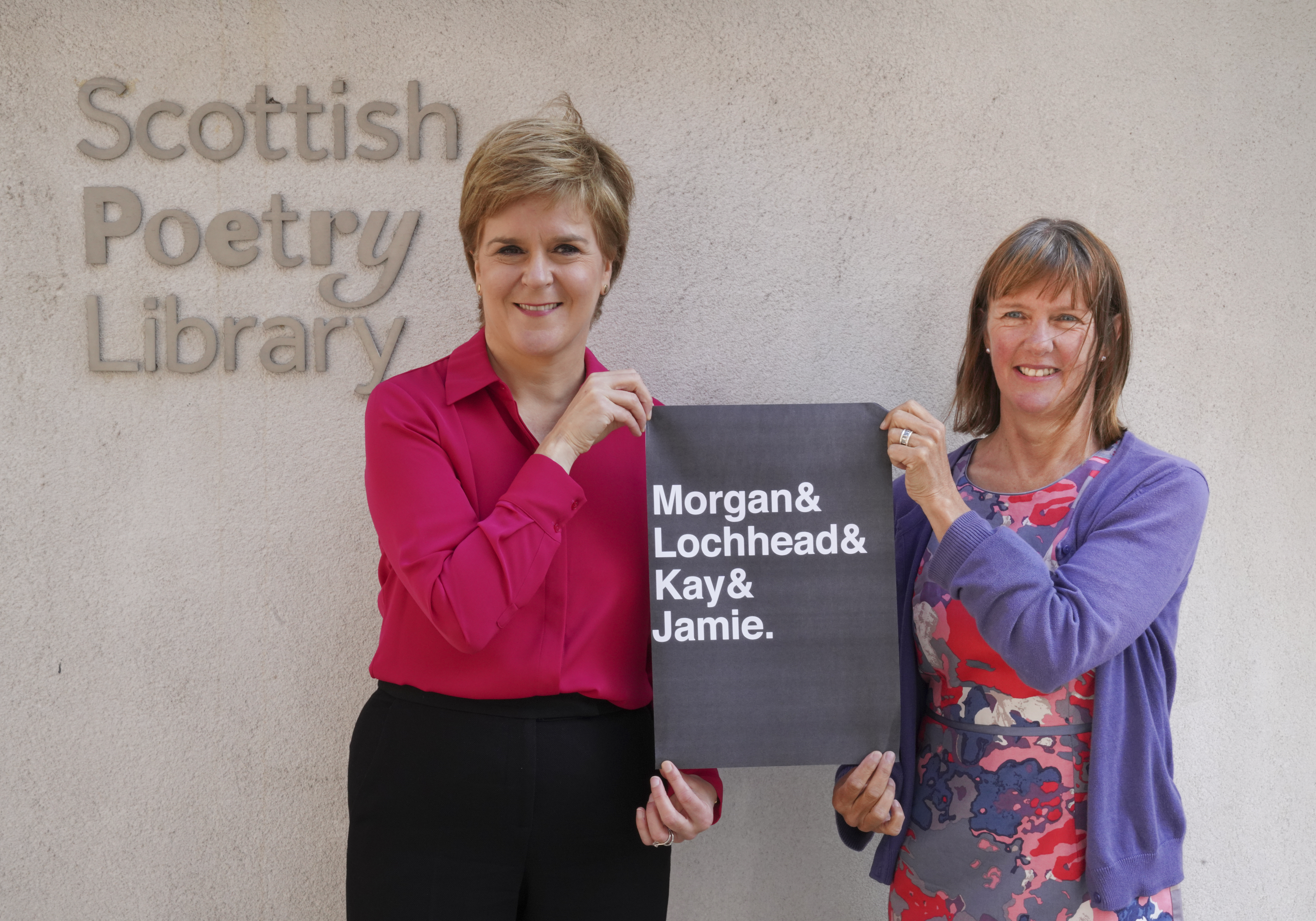
First Minister Nicola Sturgeon and Jamie in 2021

Jamie's collections include The Queen of Sheba (1995). Her 2004 collection The Tree House revealed an increasing interest in the natural world. This book won the Forward Poetry Prize and the Scottish Book of the Year Award. The Overhaul was published in September 2012. It won the 2012 Costa poetry award. For the last decade Jamie has also written non-fiction. Her collections of essays Findings and Sightlines are considered influential works of nature and landscape writing. On publication in the United States, the latter won the John Burroughs Medal and the Orion Book Award. Jamie writes occasional essays and reviews for the London Review of Books and The Guardian.

A poem by Jamie is inscribed on the national monument at Bannockburn.

In 2014, Jamie set herself the task of writing one poem per week. The resulting poems were collected in The Bonniest Companie, released in 2015, winning 2016 Saltire Society book of the year award.

Since 1998, Jamie's literary archive has been held at the National Library of Scotland.

In 2009 Jamie was elected as a Fellow of the Royal Society of Literature, and in 2018 elected as a Fellow of the Royal Society of Edinburgh.

In August 2021 Jamie was appointed as the fourth holder of the title of Scots Makar.

== Awards ==
- 1981 Eric Gregory Award
- 1995 Somerset Maugham Award for The Queen of Sheba
- 2000 Geoffrey Faber Memorial Prize for Jizzen
- 2001 Scottish Arts Council Creative Scotland Award
- 2003 Griffin Poetry Prize (Canada) (shortlist) for Mr. and Mrs. Scotland are Dead: Poems 1980–1994
- 2004 Forward Poetry Prize (Best Poetry Collection of the Year) for The Tree House
- 2005 Scottish Arts Council Book of the Year Award for The Tree House
- 2012 Costa Prize Poetry Award for The Overhaul
- 2014 John Burroughs Medal for Sightlines
- 2014 Orion Book Award for Sightlines
- 2016 Saltire Society book of the year award for The Bonniest Companie
- 2017 Ness Award "for outstanding creative writing at the confluence of travel, nature and culture"
- 2019 Highland Book Prize for Surfacing.

== Honours ==
- 2009 elected a Fellow of the Royal Society of Literature
- 2018 elected a Fellow of the Royal Society of Edinburgh
- 2021 appointed as Scots Makar

== Bibliography ==
- Black Spiders (1982)
- A Flame in Your Heart (with Andrew Greig) (1986)
- The Way We Live (1987)
- The Golden Peak: Travels in North Pakistan (1992) (reissued as Among Muslims in 2002)
- The Autonomous Region: Poems and Photographs from Tibet (1993)
- The Queen of Sheba (1994)
- Jizzen (1999)
- Mr & Mrs Scotland Are Dead (Poems 1980–94) (2002) (shortlisted for the 2003 International Griffin Poetry Prize)
- The tree house (2004) (winner of the Forward Poetry Prize) and Scottish Book of the Year Award.
- Findings (2005), essays
- This weird estate (2007)
- Sightlines (2012), essays
- The Overhaul (2012)
- The Bonniest Companie (2015)
- Selected Poems (2018)
- Surfacing (2019), essays
- Contributor to A New Divan: A Lyrical Dialogue Between East and West, Gingko Library, 2019. ISBN 9781909942288
- Editor: Antlers of Water: Writing on the Nature and Environment of Scotland (2020)
- Skeins o Geese (2023), 12 poems complemented by Woodcuts by Jo Sweeting. Published by Fine Press Poetry.
- Cairn (2024), essays and poems
