= Darling: New & Selected Poems =

Poetry book

- Author: Jackie Kay
- Language: English
- Subject: Identity
- Genre: Poetry
- Publisher: Bloodaxe Books
- Publication date: 27 October 2007
- Publication place: Scotland
- Pages: 224
- ISBN: 9781852247775

Darling: New & Selected Poems is a poetry book by Jackie Kay. It was first published by Bloodaxe Books on 27 October 2007. Gap Year, Keeping Orchids, and Whilst Leila Sleeps are all National 5 Scottish texts. Previously, Lucozade, My Grandmother's Houses, and Old Tongue were part of the course but were removed in 2024.

== Poems ==
=== Gap Year ===
The poem describes Jackie Kay and her son Matthew's bond. Her son leaves her to travel and be more independent.

=== Keeping Orchids ===
The poem describes Jackie Kay's first meeting with her birth mother. The orchids symbolise the difficulty of their relationship.

=== Lucozade ===
The poem describes a daughter visiting her mother in hospital. The daughter brings her mother gifts such as Lucozade, which was commonly given to sick people. Her mother refuses to take the gifts. The poem ends with the daughter removing the symbols of illness and in turn lifting the burden of illness.

=== My Grandmother's Houses ===
The poem describes different houses that the narrator associates with her grandmother. It gives insight into the narrator's childhood and her grandmother's personality.

=== Old Tongue ===
The poem describes the experience of losing your native tongue. The narrator wanders if they will ever say the words they used to say again. The poem includes Scottish words and phrases such as “eedyit”, “dreich” and “shut yer geggie”.

=== Whilst Leila Sleeps ===
The poem describes a mother and daughter who are fleeing from “men in plain suits”. It can be inferred that they are immigrants facing deportation.

== Critical response ==
Fiona Sampson, reviewing the book for The Guardian, called it "satisfyingly compendious" and said that one of Jackie Kay's greatest strengths is the "way she locates individual experience in the collective".
