= Cairns Craig =

Scottish literary scholar (1949–2026)

Cairns Craig OBE FRSE FBA
- Born: Robert Cairns Craig; 16 February 1949; Kilmarnock, Ayrshire and Arran, Scotland
- Died: 29 July 2026 (aged 77); Aberdour, Fife, Scotland

Academic background
- Education: University of Edinburgh
- Thesis: W.B. Yeats, T.S. Eliot and the Associationist Aesthetic (1978)

Academic work
- Discipline: Literature, Aesthetics, Intellectual History
- Institutions: University of Edinburgh; University of Aberdeen
- Main interests: Modernist literature; Scottish literature

Robert Cairns Craig OBE FRSE FBA (16 February 1949 – 29 July 2026) was a Scottish literary scholar, specialising in Scottish and modernist literature. He was Glucksman Professor of Irish and Scottish Studies and director of the Research Institute of Irish and Scottish Studies at the University of Aberdeen from 2005 to 2023, then he was professor emeritus there. Before that, he had taught at the University of Edinburgh, serving as head of the English literature department from 1997 to 2003, and as deputy director of The Institute for Advanced Studies in the Humanities from 1998 to 2005. He was elected a fellow of the British Academy in 2005.

== Life and work ==
Craig was awarded a PhD from the University of Edinburgh in 1978 for his thesis W.B. Yeats, T.S. Eliot and the Associationist Aesthetic. While a postgraduate student in the mid-seventies, he taught Scottish literature at the Scottish Universities International Summer School, and this led to him assisting one of his students, Professor Masaru Victor Otake, with the translation of Hugh MacDiarmid's A Drunk Man Looks at the Thistle into Japanese. The work was published in 1981.

He published on authors including W. B. Yeats, T. S. Eliot, Ezra Pound, Iain Banks, and Muriel Spark.

His 1984 book on Yeats, Eliot, and Pound was described by Seamus Deane as lacking a little clarity, panache and focus, but offering an "engrossing" exploration of the relationship between modernism and reactionary politics, which he links via memory, and particularly Archibald Alison's theory of associationism; Deane called it "a complicated story, illustrated by Craig with such well-chosen and well-timed quotations that it is difficult to resist."

In 1991 he wrote "Rooms without a view", an influential article attacking "heritage film".

The Modern Scottish Novel: Narrative and the National Imagination (1999) brought a "modern, inclusive, skeptical intelligence" to the question of Scottish literature.

Craig was general editor of the four-volume series History of Scottish Literature (published 1987-89).

He was also involved as editor or publisher with magazines including Cencrastus, Edinburgh Review and Radical Scotland.

Craig relaunched the Aberdeen University Press (est. in 1900) in 2013.

Craig died in Aberdour on 29 July 2026, aged 77.

== Publications ==
- The Body in the Kit Bag: History and the Scottish Novel, in Cencrastus No. 1, Autumn 1979, pp. 18 – 22, ISSN 0264-0856
- Fearful Selves: Character, Community and the Scottish Imagination, in Cencrastus No. 4, Winter 1980-81, pp. 29 – 32, ISSN 0264-0856
- Going Down to Hell is Easy: Alasdair Gray's 'Lanark', in Glen Murray (ed.), Cencrastus No. 6, Autumn 1981, pp. 19 - 21, ISSN 0264-0856
- Yeats, Eliot, Pound and the Politics of Poetry (University of Pittsburgh Press, 1982), ISBN 9781138999343
- Peripheries, in Cencrastus No. 9, Summer 1982, pp. 3 - 5, ISSN 0264-0856
- Giving Speech to the Silent, which reviews Continuous: 50 Sonnets from The School of Eloquence by Tony Harrison and From the Domain of Arnheim by Alastair Fowler, in Hearn, Sheila G. (ed.), Cencrastus No. 10, Autumn 1982, pp. 43 & 44, ISSN 0264-0856
- Visitors from the Stars: Scottish Film Culture, in Hearn, Sheila G. (ed.), Cencrastus No. 11, New Year 1983, pp. 6 - 11, ISSN 0264-0856
- An Interview with Kurt Vonnegut in Hearn, Sheila G. (ed.), Cencrastus No. 13, Summer 1983, pp. 29 - 31, ISSN 0264-0856
- Lourd on My Hert, which reviews Chapman 35/36: The State of Scotland - A Predicament for the Scottish Writer?, edited by Joy Hendry; Scotland: The Broken Image by Norman Allan; The State of Scotland: A Poem, by Duncan Glen; and Europa's Lover, by Douglas Dunn, in Hearn, Sheila G. (ed.), Cencrastus No. 15, New Year 1984, pp. 54 & 55, ISSN 0264-0856
- George Orwell and the English Ideology (Part 1), in Hearn, Sheila G. (ed.), Cencrastus No. 16, Spring 1984, pp. 12 - 17, ISSN 0264-0856
- George Orwell and the English Ideology (Part 2), in Parker, Geoff (ed.), Cencrastus No. 17, Summer 1984, pp. 10 - 15, ISSN 0264-0856
- Nation and History, in Parker, Geoff (ed.), Cencrastus No. 19, Winter 1984, pp. 13 - 16, ISSN 0264-0856
- General editor, Editor of 3-4 vols, The History of Scottish Literature (4 vols, Aberdeen UP, 1987–89), ISBN 0080350542
- Out of History: Narrative Paradigms in Scottish and English Culture (Polygon,1996), ISBN 9780748660827
- The Modern Scottish Novel: Narrative and the National Imagination (Edinburgh UP, 1999), ISBN 978-0-7486-0893-5
- Iain Banks's Complicity: A Reader's Guide (Continuum, 2002), ISBN 978-0-8264-5247-4
- Constituting Scotland (Edinburgh Review No. 109, 2002), ISBN 185-9-3320-56
- Associationism and the Literary Imagination: From the Phantasmal Chaos (Edinburgh UP, 2007), ISBN 978-0-7486-0912-3
- Intending Scotland: Explorations in Scottish Culture since the Enlightenment (Edinburgh UP, 2009), ISBN 978-0-7486-3713-3.
- Editor, Vita Mea: The Autobiography of Sir Herbert J. C. Grierson (Aberdeen UP, 2015), ISBN 978-1-85752-002-6
- The Wealth of the Nation: Scotland, Culture and Independence (Edinburgh UP, 2018), ISBN 978-1-4744-3558-1
- Muriel Spark, Existentialism and the Art of Death (Edinburgh UP, 2019), ISBN 978-1-4744-4720-1
- Constructing the Aesthetics of Nature, in Szécsényi, Endre (ed.), Aesthetics, Nature and Religion: Ronald W. Hepburn and his Legacy (Aberdeen UP, 2020), pp. 195 - 214, ISBN 978-1-85752-082-8
- Editor, The Collected Works of Kenneth White (4 vols, Edinburgh UP, 2021-2025), ISBN 978-1-4744-8129-8
- Scotland and Environmental Aesthetics, in Radnóti, Sándor, Wessely, Anna, Reményi, Édua (eds.), "To Bring Philosophy out of Closets and Libraries, Schools and Colleges": Ünnepi kötet Szécsényi Endre 60. születésnapjára - Liber Amicorum for Endre Szécsényi (private edition, Budapest, 2025), pp. 121 - 168, ISBN 978-615-02-3918-7
- Editor, International Companion to the Scottish Novel (Scottish Literature International, 2025), ISBN 978-1-9089-8043-4

== Awards ==
- 2003: Fellow of the Royal Society of Edinburgh (FRSE)
- 2005: Fellow of the British Academy (FBA)
- 2007: Officer of the Order of the British Empire (OBE)

== Reviews ==
- Morgan, Edwin (1983), The Politics of Poetry: review of Yeats, Eliot, Pound and the Politics of Poetry, in Hearn, Sheila G. (ed.), Cencrastus No. 12, Spring 1983, p. 44, ISSN 0264-0856
