= Pàdraig MacAoidh =

Scottish academic, writer, poet and broadcaster (born 1979)

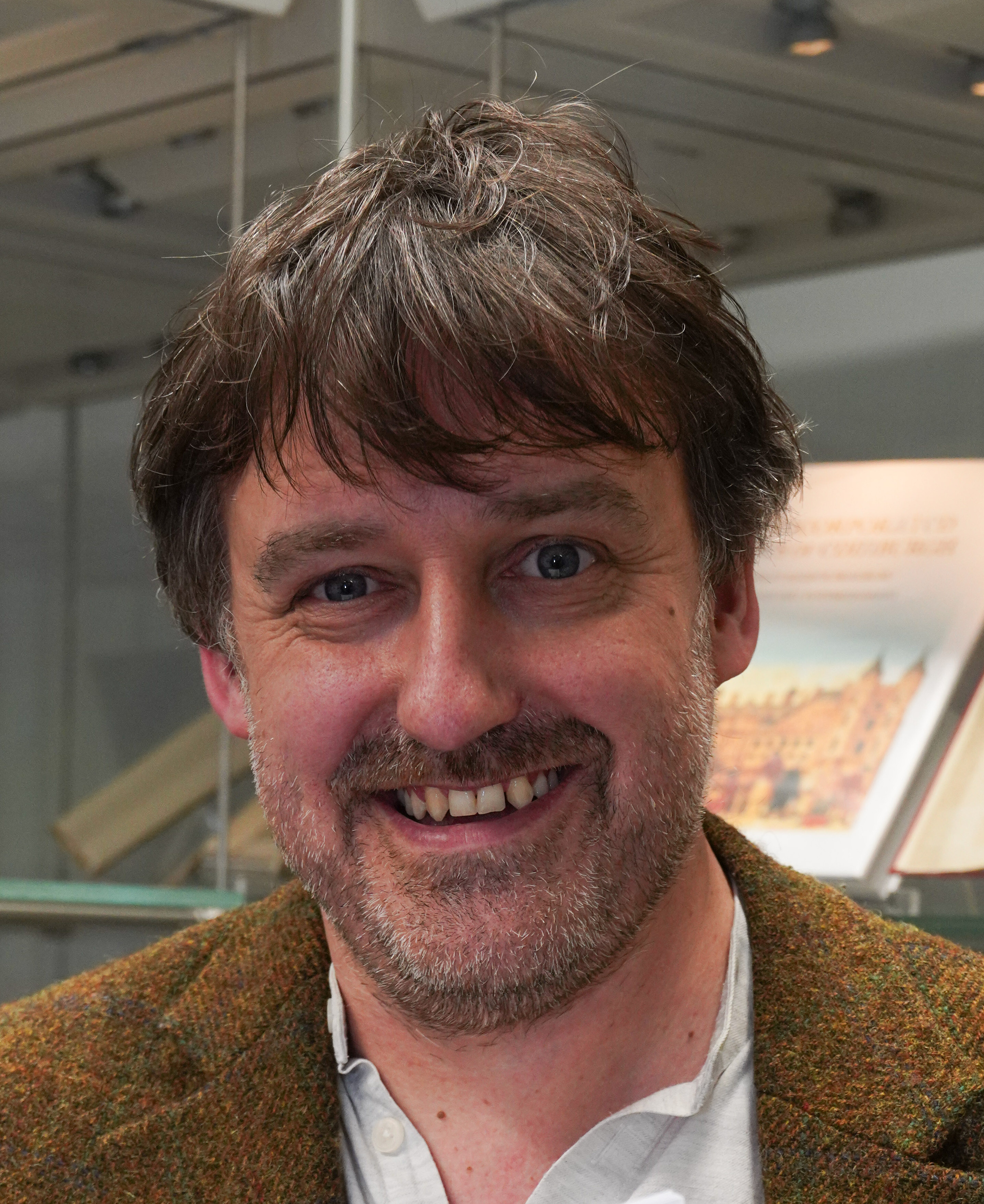
- MacAoidh in December 2024

Makar
- Incumbent
- Assumed office 2 December 2024
- Preceded by: Kathleen Jamie

Personal details
- Born: 1979 (age 46–47) Isle of Lewis, Scotland
- Education: University of Glasgow; Trinity College, Dublin
- Occupation: Poet, academic, broadcaster, writer

Pàdraig MacAoidh (English: Peter Mackay) (born 1979) is a Scottish academic, writer, poet and broadcaster, currently serving as the Makar since 2 December 2024. Appointed by first minister John Swinney, he succeeded Kathleen Jamie in the role, and is the first Makar to write primarily in Scottish Gaelic.

== Early life and education ==
MacAoidh was born in 1979 on the Isle of Lewis in the Outer Hebrides in Scotland. He previously attended Trinity College, Dublin, as well as obtaining a Master of Arts from the University of Glasgow.

== Career ==
=== Broadcasting ===
His work in broadcasting is inspired and influenced by the diverse linguistic heritage of the Isle of Lewis where he was born and raised as a child. He has appeared on BBC Alba as a broadcaster.

=== Academic ===
MacAoidh is a Senior Lecturer in Literature at the University of St Andrews. Academically, MacAoidh is considered an expert in both Scottish and Irish literature, primarily from 1800 to the present day, and is particularly interested in Scottish Gaelic literature.

=== Writing and poetry ===
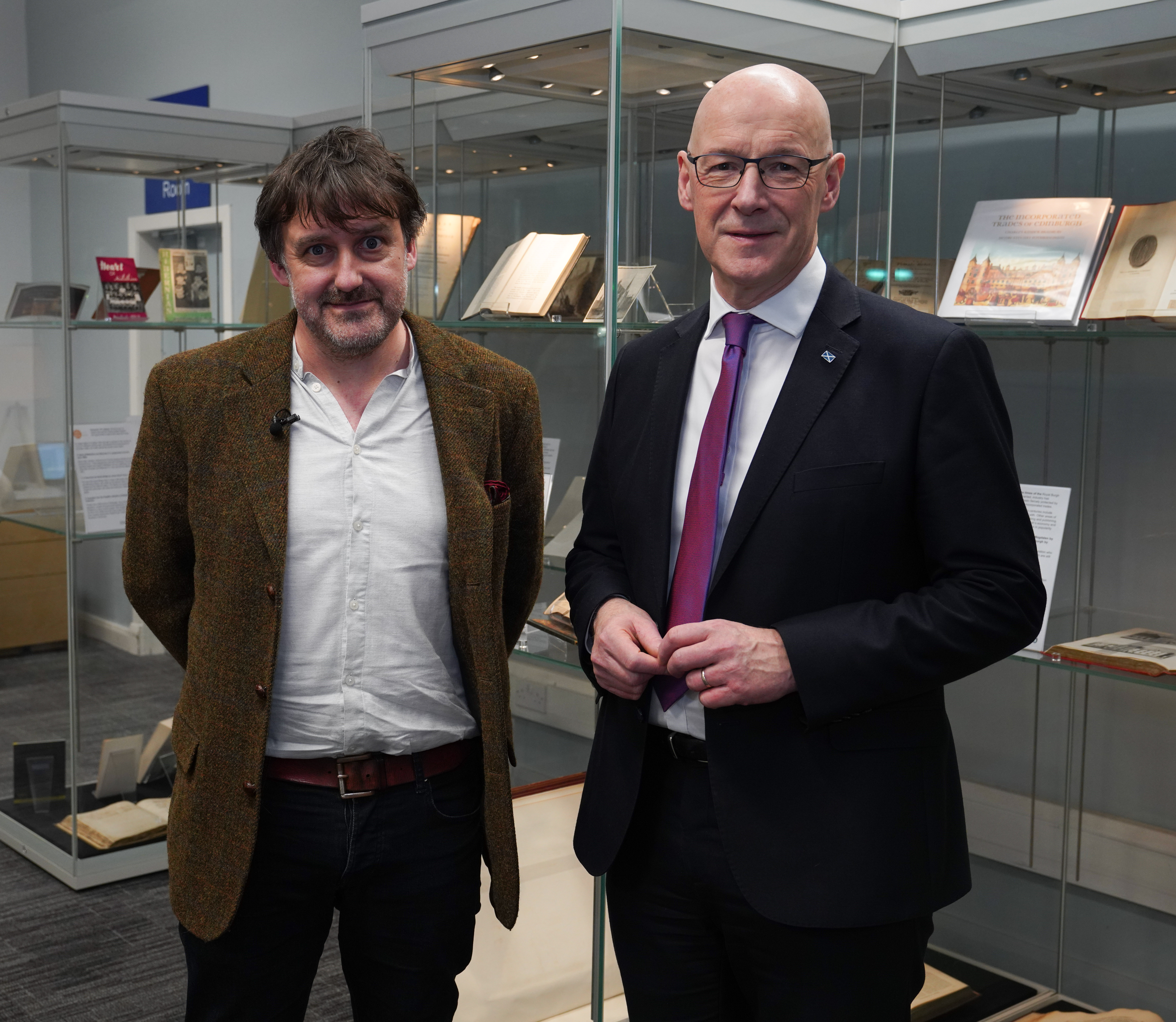
MacAoidh with John Swinney, December 2024

His published collection of poems include Gu Leòr (2015) and Acair: Nàdur De (2020), as well as a published pamphlet, From Another Island (2010). His poems are written in both the English and Scottish Gaelic language, however, his works is predominately written in Scottish Gaelic. His works have been translated into a number of various languages, primarily in Europe, including French, German and Irish.

In December 2024, he was appointed the Makar, the national poet of Scotland, by first minister John Swinney. Upon his appointment, Swinney stated that he was "very pleased" with the appointment, further claiming that "he has attracted a wide audience, and many accolades, through his originality, playfulness and willingness to take risks with language".

Additionally, MacAoidh claimed he was "very grateful to the panel for their faith in me, and to the First Minister for his support, and especially his enthusiasm about a Gaelic poet taking on the role".

His appointment marked the first time that a Scottish Gaelic poet had been appointed to the role of Makar.

== Poem to celebrate Scotland's Achievement in qualifying for the World Cup ==
In April 2026, the Herald newspaper highlighted the fact that MacAoidh had composed a poem in English and Gaelic about Scotland's qualification for the World Cup. The newspaper quoted the Makar as saying "whenever Scotland does well on sporting occasions internationally, whether it’s men or women’s teams, it’s a useful way of pulling people in the country together." He referenced Kenny McLean's lob over Peter Schmeichel's head as being his specific inspiration, quoting from his own poem " ‘watching a ball tumble in its everyday, humdrum perfect parabola, to fall plump as a rainbow back to earth’.”

The poem is called "Ris an do-dhèanta" in Gaelic and "At the impossible" in English.
