= Joyce Keller =

American journalist

Joyce Keller (1943–2025) was an American television and radio host, author, and psychic medium. She hosted a local radio show in Long Island, New York for 35 years and made numerous television appearances. She was also the author of 7 books.

== Early life and education ==
Keller was born on May 28, 1943, the daughter of Joseph and Grace Tagliarini. She grew up in New York in Brooklyn and Babylon, Long Island.

== Career ==
Keller began her career as an exercise instructor. She was the host and producer of a number of shows, including Trim & Slim on WSNL-TV and Viacom's Joyce Keller Mag. Keller also made numerous television appearances, including on Oprah, Donahue, Geraldo, Joan Rivers, and Regis. She was also the subject of a segment on Entertainment Tonight in 1987.

For 35 years, Keller hosted the radio show The Joyce Keller Show on WGBB in Long Island, New York. The show was helped turn around the radio station's dip in ratings in 1987. The show marked its 20th anniversary in 2007.

Keller was the author of 7 books. She also wrote for Nightlife and Update magazines.

== Personal life and death ==
Keller married husband, Jack Keller, in 1959. He was an engineer. The couple had 2 children.

Keller died on 24 September 2025. She was 82.

== Works ==
- Seven Steps to Heaven
- Calling All Angels
- Keller, Jack; Keller, Joyce. Complete Book of Numerology. St Martins Griffins.
- How to Communicate with those you've Loved
- The Love Keys: A Heart Hunter’s Guide to Attracting, Awakening, and Receiving Sacred Love (Heart Hunting Book 1)
- The Joy of Miracles
- Why am I here?
- Why God?
