= Cencrastus =

Scottish magazine

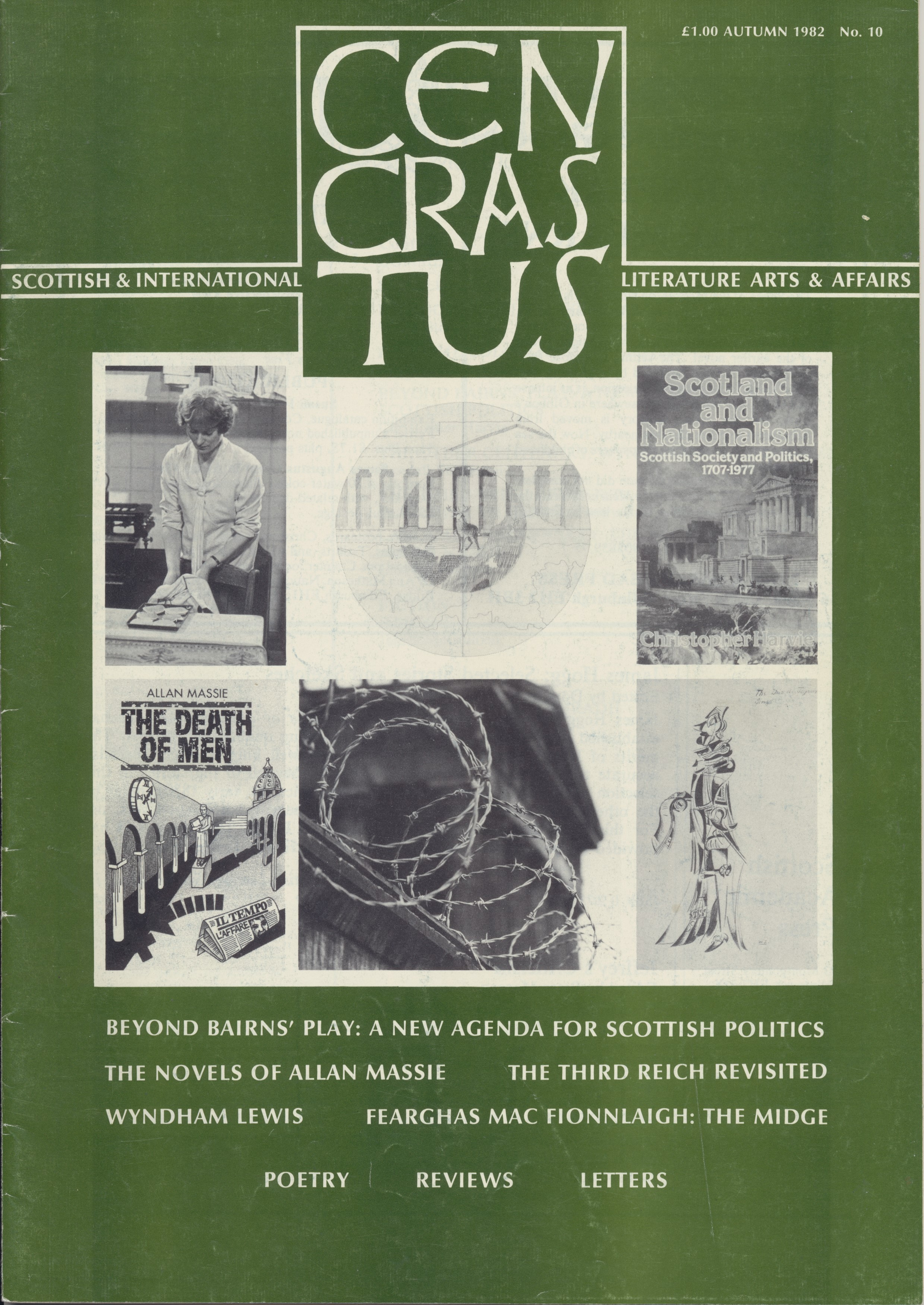

Cencrastus was a magazine devoted to Scottish and international literature, arts and affairs, founded after the Referendum of 1979 by students, mainly of Scottish literature, at Edinburgh University, and with support from Cairns Craig, then a lecturer in the English Department, with the express intention of perpetuating the devolution debate. Its title, which refers to the mythical curly snake, was inspired by Hugh MacDiarmid's poetry collection, To Circumjack Cencrastus, published in 1930.

The magazine was published three times a year. Its founders were Christine Bold, John Burns, Bill Findlay, Sheila G. Hearn, Glen Murray and Raymond J. Ross. Editors included Glen Murray (1981–1982), Sheila G. Hearn (1982–1984), Geoff Parker (1984–1986) and Cairns Craig (1987). Raymond Ross was publisher and editor of the magazine for nearly 20 years (1987–2006). Latterly the magazine was published with the help of a grant from the Scottish Arts Council. It ceased publication in 2006.

Contributors included Christopher Harvie, Duncan Macmillan, Stephen Maxwell, Brian Holton, Craig Beveridge, Ronald Turnbull, Colin McArthur, Randall Stevenson, Glenda Norquay, Jim Gilchrist, Freddie Anderson and Fred Johnston

Cencrastus is one of the cultural and political magazines researched by the Scottish Magazines Network.
