= Alasdair Gray bibliography =

Alasdair Gray (1934–2019) wrote novels, short stories, poetry and drama.

== Novels ==
- Lanark (1981) ISBN 978-1-84767-374-9
- 1982, Janine (1984) ISBN 978-1-84767-444-9
- The Fall of Kelvin Walker (1985)
- Something Leather (1990) ISBN 9780330319447
- McGrotty and Ludmilla (1990) ISBN 9781872536002
- Poor Things (1992) ISBN 9781564783073
- A History Maker (1994)
- Mavis Belfrage (1996) ISBN 9780747530893
- Old Men In Love (2007) ISBN 9780747593539

== Short stories ==
- Unlikely Stories, Mostly (1983) ISBN 978-1-84767-502-6
- Lean Tales (1985) (with James Kelman and Agnes Owens) (1995) ISBN 9780099585411
- Ten Tales Tall & True (1993) ISBN 9780151000906
- The Ends of Our Tethers: 13 Sorry Stories. Canongate Books. 2005. ISBN 978-1-84195-626-8.
- Every Short Story by Alasdair Gray 1951-2012. Canongate Books. 2012. ISBN 978-0-85786-562-5.

== Poetry ==
- Old Negatives (1989) ISBN 9780224026567
- Sixteen Occasional Poems (2000)
- Collected Verse (2010) ISBN 9781906120535
- Guts Minced with Oatmeal: Ten Late poems (2018) ISBN 9780992729875

== Translations ==
- Hell: Dante's Divine Trilogy Part One, Decorated and Englished in Prosaic Verse (2018) ISBN 978-1-78689-253-9
- Purgatory: Dante's Divine Trilogy Part Two, Englished in Prosaic Verse (2019) ISBN 978-1-78689-473-1
- Paradise: Dante's Divine Trilogy Part Three, Englished in Prosaic Verse (2020) ISBN 978-1786894748

== Theatre ==
- Dialogue - A Duet (1971)
- The Loss of the Golden Silence(1973)
- Homeward Bound: A Trio for Female Chauvinists (1973)
- Sam Lang and Miss Watson: A One Act Sexual Comedy In Four Scenes (1973)
- McGrotty and Ludmilla (1986)
- Working Legs: A Play for Those Without Them (1997)
- Goodbye Jimmy (2006)
- Midgieburgers (2007)
- A Gray Play Book (2009) ISBN 9781906307912
- Fleck (2011)

== Television ==
- Martin (1971)
- Dialogue - A Duet (1972)
- Today and Yesterday (1975)
- Beloved (1976)

== Radio ==
- Quiet People (1968)
- Dialogue: A Duet (1969)
- The Trial of Thomas Muir (1970)
- The Loss of the Golden Silence (1973)
- McGrotty and Ludmilla (1975)

== As illustrator ==
- 100 Songs of Scotland (Author, Wilma Patterson) (1996))

== Non-fiction ==
- Why Scots Should Rule Scotland (1992; revised 1997)ISBN 978-0862416713
- The Book of Prefaces (ed.) (2000) ISBN 978-0747559122
- A Short Survey of Classic Scottish Writing (2001), (ISBN 978-1841951676)
- How We Should Rule Ourselves (2005) (with Adam Tomkins, ISBN 978-1841957227)
- Gray, Alasdair (2009). A Life In Pictures. Canongate Books. ISBN 978-1-84767-962-8.
- Of Me & Others: An Autobiography (Cargo Publishing.) (2014) ISBN 978-1786895202

== Other appearances ==
=== Music ===
- Cindytalk Wappinschaw (Touched Recordings, 1994) - Gray appears on "Wheesht" reading from Book 2 of Lanark
- Future Pilot AKA Secrets From The Clockhouse (Creeping Bent, 2006) – Gray performs on "Equations of Love"
- LAN Formatique The Sadness of Distances (Signifier, 2012) - Gray reads from the poems "Mind the Gap" and "1st of March, 1990", and in "The Stars Are But Thistles" reads from the poem "Dictators".

=== Film ===
- Under the Helmet was a 1964 BBC film about the career of Alasdair Gray.

=== Anthologies ===
- (Contributor) Pax Edina: The One O' Clock Gun Anthology (Edinburgh, 2010)
- (Contributor) "Elsewhere: Here" (Cargo Publishing/McSweeney's, 2012) ISBN 9781908885050
- (Contributor) Beacons: Stories for Our Not So Distant Future (Oneworld Publications, 2013) ISBN 978-1851689699

== Books about Gray ==
=== Academic ===
- The Arts of Alasdair Gray, Robert Crawford and Thom Nairn (1991) ISBN 978-0748602940
- Alasdair Gray, Stephen Bernstein (1999) ISBN 9780838754146
- Alasdair Gray: A Unique Scottish Magus, Joy Hendry (ed.) (2000) ISBN 978-0906772973
- Alasdair Gray: Critical Appreciations and a Bibliography, Phil Moores (ed.) (2001; includes contributions by Gray.) ISBN 978-0712311298
- Postmodern Strategies in Alasdair Gray's Lanark: A Life in Four Books, Luis de Juan (2003) ISBN 978-0820459905
- Shades of Gray: Science Fiction, History and the Problem of Postmodernism in the Work of Alasdair Gray, Dietmar Böhnke (2004) ISBN 978-1931255189
- Alasdair Gray: The Fiction of Communion, Gavin Miller (2005) ISBN 978-9042017573
- Voices from Modern Scotland: Janice Galloway, Alasdair Gray, Bernard Sellin (coord.) (2007) ISBN 978-2916424101
- Alasdair Gray: Ink for Worlds, Camille Manfredi (ed.) (2014; includes contributions by Gray.) ISBN 978-1137401779

=== Biographical ===
- Alasdair Gray: A Secretary's Biography, Rodge Glass (2008) ISBN 978-0747590156
- A Life in Pictures (2010) (illustrated autobiography) ISBN 978-1841956404
