= List of Scottish dramatists =

This is a list of playwrights either born in Scotland or living/based in Scotland. Playwrights whose work is in Scottish Gaelic and Broad Scots are included.

== A – J ==
- Marion Adams-Acton
- William Alexander, 1st Earl of Stirling
- Dave Anderson
- Freddie Anderson
- Hugh Abercrombie Anderson
- James Robertson Anderson
- Arthur Argo
- David Ashton
- Joanna Baillie
- Chris Ballance
- J. M. Barrie
- Alistair Beaton
- Alan Bissett
- James Bridie
- George MacKay Brown
- Bill Bryden
- George Buchanan
- Gregory Burke
- John Byrne
- Lord Byron
- Victor Carin
- Catrìona Lexy Chaimbeul (Catriona Lexy Campbell)
- Glenn Chandler
- Kate Clanchy
- J. Storer Clouston
- Stewart Conn
- Grace Corbett
- Joe Corrie
- A. J. Cronin
- John Davidson
- Ann Marie Di Mambro
- Anne Donovan
- William Douglas-Home
- Alexander Dow
- Anne Downie
- Arthur Conan Doyle
- Walterina Cunningham
- Carol Ann Duffy
- Graham Eatough
- Suzy Enoch
- David Erskine
- Henry Brougham Farnie
- Simon Farquhar
- Bill Findlay
- Tom Gallacher
- Alan Gilmour
- John Glashan
- Sue Glover
- Janey Godley
- Alasdair Gray
- Nicholas Stuart Gray
- Stephen Greenhorn
- David Greig
- Gavin Greig
- Catherine Grosvenor
- Kris Haddow
- Andrew Halliday
- Tom Hanlin
- David Harrower
- Jennifer S Hartley
- Ian Hay
- John Home
- Gordon Honeycombe
- Jules Horne
- Armando Iannucci
- D C Jackson
- Robert William Jameson
- Fleeming Jenkin
- Ada F. Kay

== K – Z ==
- James Kelman
- Robert Kemp
- Jessie Kesson
- William Lauder
- Charlotte Lennox
- Liz Lochhead
- John Logan
- David Lyndsay
- Andrew MacDonald
- Robert David MacDonald
- Sharman MacDonald
- Peter McDougall
- John McGrath
- Tom McGrath
- Henry MacKenzie
- Norman McKinnel
- Robert McLellan
- David MacLennan
- Joseph MacLeod
- Roddy McMillan
- Aonghas MacNeacail
- Kevin MacNeil
- Steven McNicoll
- Willy Maley
- David Mallet
- David Marshall
- Forbes Masson
- Douglas Maxwell
- Peter May
- Denise Mina
- Graham Moffat
- Paul Morris
- Grant Morrison
- Rona Munro
- Anthony Neilson
- Janet Paisley
- Archibald Pitcairne
- John Purser
- David Purves
- Allan Ramsay
- Alexander Reid
- Stanley Robertson
- Tony Roper
- Suhayl Saadi
- Sara Shaarawi
- John Smith
- Sydney Goodsir Smith
- W. Gordon Smith
- Alan Spence
- Gerda Stevenson
- Ena Lamont Stewart
- Zoë Strachan
- Cecil Taylor
- William Templeton
- William Tennant
- Josephine Tey
- Margaret Turnbull
- Joan Ure
- Deborah Wallace
- William Watson
- James Wedderburn
- Irvine Welsh
- Louise Welsh
- Brian Whittingham
- Andrew P. Wilson

== See also ==
- Theatre of Scotland
- List of theatres in Scotland
- List of Irish dramatists
- Scottish literature
- List of Scottish poets
- List of Scottish novelists
- List of Scottish short story writers
