= Alasdair Grant Taylor =

Scottish artist and sculptor (1934–2007)

Alasdair Grant Taylor (1936–2007) was a Scottish artist and sculptor.

== Life ==
Alasdair Taylor was born in Ross-shire and attended Lesmahagow High School. He trained as an artist at the Glasgow School of Art, subsequently living in Denmark and Glasgow. In 1967 he moved to Portencross, Ayrshire, where he lived reclusively with his wife Annelise and their daughters Anna and Jean. In March 2005 he suffered a stroke and had to leave his home. He died in 2007.

== Work ==
Taylor's formative influences included the COBRA group in Denmark, especially Asger Jorn, whom his wife knew.

In most of his oil paintings before the mid-1960s, the paint is thickly applied. After this time, he used oil more thinly. There are extremes of colour from bright to sombre.

His nude drawings and paintings of nudes are mostly of his wife. His collages used photographs and newspaper cuttings combined with brush strokes, influenced by Dadaism and early Cubism. He made abstract oil paintings with brush, palette knife, spray can and other techniques: some of these are intended to be hung in groups and named after the seasons.

Sculptures were created from driftwood which Taylor collected from the beach near Portencross, then carved and partly painted or varnished. He made use of stones similarly.

He filled notebooks with ideas mingled with sketches in pen or watercolour and did ink drawings on the blank pages of art books he had been given.

The Scottish Arts Council has given a grant to Street Level Photoworks to catalogue and digitise Taylor's work.

== Alasdair Gray and James Kelman ==
Taylor's work is the subject of an ongoing promotion by his friends Alasdair Gray and James Kelman to raise it out of obscurity that they argue is undeserved.

Taylor also featured in Portrait of a painter, "the story of an artist ... who persists in his painting though he remains unrecognized and unrewarded", in Gray's 1985 short story anthology Lean Tales, co-written with James Kelman and Agnes Owens.

He was also among those whose profile as visual artists Gray attempted to raise in his collaborative 5 Scottish Artists exhibition in 1986.

The Two Alasdairs was an exhibition which ran at the Glasgow School of Art's Mackintosh Gallery from 22 November 2008 to 10 January 2009. It celebrated the art of Alasdair Gray and Alasdair Taylor, and their long friendship. The exhibition included a television interview with Taylor by BBC Scotland's W. Gordon Smith (in the arts TV series "Scope" in 1974).

== Exhibitions ==
- 5 Scottish Artists' Retrospective Show - McLellan Art Galleries, Glasgow, and Talbot Rice Art Centre, Edinburgh, 1986
- Alasdair Taylor, a Retrospective - Harbour Arts Centre, Irvine, 2007
- The Two Alasdairs: Alasdair Gray & Alasdair Taylor - Mackintosh Gallery, Glasgow School of Art, November 2008 to January 2009
