= Allan Cameron (author) =

Scottish writer and translator

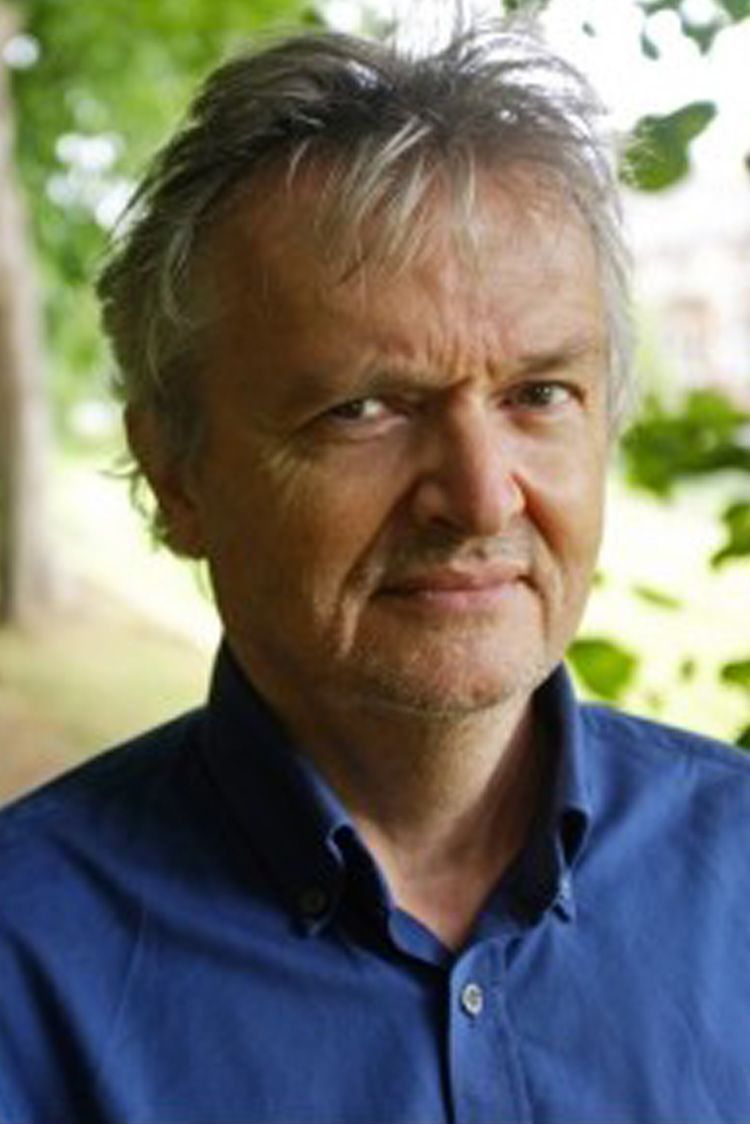
- Cameron in 2013
- Born: 1952 (age 73–74); Watford
- Occupation: Novelist

Allan Cameron (born 1952) is a Scottish author and translator.

== Early life ==
Allan Cameron was brought up in Nigeria and Bangladesh. He worked at sea, and at the age of twenty, he moved to Italy, where he lived for many years. At the age of 31, Cameron went to university and after graduating, he worked in the same department he had studied at. In 1992, he moved to Scotland. Cameron now lives in Glasgow.

== Career ==
Cameron has published articles in the daily newspaper L’Unità, the Italian current affairs magazine Reset, and the academic journals Teoria Politica and Renaissance Studies. He also contributed the comments on Pope, Hume and Winstanley to Alasdair Gray's The Book of Prefaces. His unpublished works include three plays, two in Italian (Quei baffoni di Giorgio Scali and Grembizzot: gli ultimi giorni di uno sconfitto) and one in English (Calvin’s Christ). He has also produced a number of short stories and poetry in both languages.

Cameron has translated seventeen books by a variety of writers, including the post-war Italian philosopher Norberto Bobbio, the president of the European Commission Romano Prodi, and the historian Eric Hobsbawm.

He has published two novels, The Golden Menagerie and The Berlusconi Bonus.

Cameron has published a book on language, In Praise of the Garrulous (2008), a collection of poetry, Presbyopia (2009), and two collections of short stories, Can the Gods Cry? (2011) and On the Heroism of Mortals (2012).

From 2008 Cameron was the editorial director of Vagabond Voices. It is a small, independent publishing house based in Glasgow, committed to introducing new titles from Scottish authors and translating fiction from other languages.

== Bibliography ==
=== Fiction ===
Novels

- The Golden Menagerie (Luath Press Ltd, 2004)
- The Berlusconi Bonus (Luath Press Ltd, 2005), (Azimut, Roma, 2006), (Vagabond Voices, 2010)
- Cinico: Travels with a Good Professor at the Time of the Scottish Referendum (Vagabond Voices, 2017)
- A Woman's War Against Progress (Vagabond Voices, 2023)

Poetry

- Presbyopia: Selected Poems (Vagabond Voices, 2009)
- A Barrel of Dried Leaves (Vagabond Voices, 2016)

Short Story Collections

- Can the Gods Cry? (Vagabond Voices, 2011)
- On the Heroism of Mortals (Vagabond Voices, 2012)

=== Non-fiction ===
- In Praise of the Garrulous (Vagabond Voices, 2008)
- Things Written Randomly in Doubt (Vagabond Voices, 2014)
