= Sara Shaarawi =

Egyptian playwright and producer (born 1989)

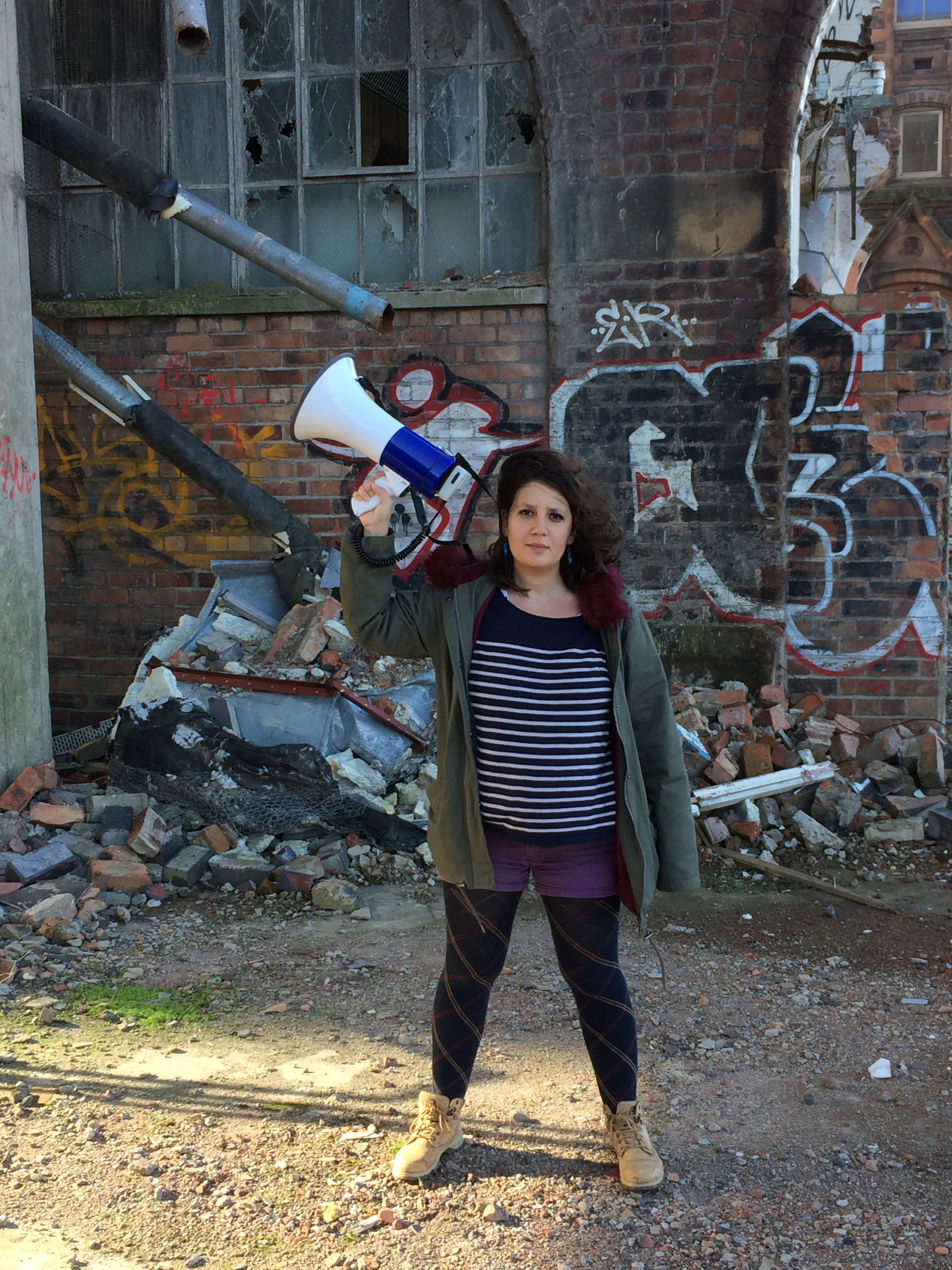
Sara Shaarawi stands in a derelict biscuit factory in Glasgow holding a Megaphone in a promotional image for the Workers Theatre.

Sara Shaarawi (born 1989) is an Egyptian playwright and producer. She is chiefly known for her work in Scottish Theatre.

== Early life ==
Shaarawi was born in 1989, raised in Cairo and settled in Scotland after studying there.

== Career ==
While at the University of Edinburgh in 2011 Shaarawi began working with David Greig on a series of Arab plays to be performed at Oran Mor as part of an Arab Spring season. The experience launched her into Scottish theatre and her first play, Niqabi Ninja, was shared as a work in progress at the Tron Theatre in 2014 and Platform in 2015. Niqabi Ninja has since been performed in Germany and South Africa. In August 2021, Niqabi Ninja had simultaneous runs at five cities in Scotland.

Other work for theatre has included Leyla, performed at the Tron Theatre in 2017 and Lifted, with her co-writer Henry Bell, which appeared at the Edinburgh Fringe in 2015 and 2016.

Shaarawi is the recipient of a New Playwright's Award from Playwright's Studio and the Starter Programme from the National Theatre of Scotland. Other projects include a Cairene adaptation of Alasdair Gray's 1982, Janine with Henry Bell. The play Haneen had a rehearsal reading in Egypt.

As a producer Shaarawi is known for her work with the Arab Arts Focus, both in organising the largest Arab Arts Festival to come to the Edinburgh Fringe, and as the host of its nightly cabaret, Chill Habibi. Shaarawi is a founder member of The Workers Theatre, and produces Megaphone, a crowdfunded residency for artists of colour in Scotland.

In 2017 Shaarawi, was ranked 43rd in The List Hot 100.

== Personal life ==
Shaarawi lives in Glasgow, Scotland.
