= Martin (play) =

1972 play by Alasdair Gray

- Written by: Alasdair Gray

Martin is a play by Alasdair Gray, recorded on 6 January 1972 and broadcast as the last episode of the BBC TV series The Group. Gray later reworked this material for the chapter "The Proposal" in his novel Something Leather.
