= Old Men in Love =

Book by Alasdair Gray published in 2007

First edition

Old Men in Love is a book by Alasdair Gray, published by Bloomsbury in 2007.

== Plot ==
The book purports to be a found manuscript by John Tunnock, which Gray merely edits - from the author's earlier Poor Things, the writing presented as Tunnock's likewise recycles earlier material by Gray. Tunnock's unfinished trilogy of novels, based on the lives of Socrates, Fra Lippo Lippi and Henry James Prince, are re-workings of earlier stage and television drama by Gray.

In the afterword to the novel the literary critic Sidney Workman (a fictitious alter-ego of Gray used in his debut novel, Lanark), points out the novel's themes.

Old Men in Love was met with an ambiguous critical reception, praised for its striking design and criticised for its lack of substance and derivation from earlier material. Writing in the Observer, James Purdon commented that "In form as well as subject matter, this is probably the most twitchily onanistic fiction since Portnoy's Complaint".
