= Unlikely Stories, Mostly =

- First edition
- Author: Alasdair Gray
- Cover artist: Alasdair Gray
- Publisher: Canongate Press
- Publication date: 17 February 1983
- Publication place: Scotland
- Media type: Print (hardcover)
- ISBN: 978-0862410292

Unlikely Stories, Mostly is the first collection of short stories by Alasdair Gray, published in 1983.

== Publishing history ==
Unlikely Stories, Mostly was released as a Canongate hardback in 1983; an erratum slip was inserted into the first edition that read "This slip has been inserted by mistake." A Penguin Books paperback was issued in 1984. "Five Letters from an Eastern Empire" was issued as a stand-alone work in 1995 as part of Penguin's Penguin 60s series.

A revised edition with the extra stories "A Unique Case" and "Inches in a Column" in thirteenth and fourteenth place, and a new postscript by Douglas Gifford, was released in 2010. "Logopandocy" is retitled "Sir Thomas's Logopandocy", and "Prometheus" as "M. Pollard's Prometheus" in this edition. In 2012 the entire work was included in Gray's collection Every Short Story 1951–2012.

== Summary ==
Like Gray's best-known work Lanark, the book was published in the 1980s but contains work going back thirty years.

- "The Star"
  A fantasy in the style of H. G. Wells about a star falling into an urban back garden. Written when Gray was a teenager, it was first published in Collins Magazine for Boys and Girls in 1951.
- "The Spread of Ian Nicol"
  A riveter who begins to undergo fission.
- "The Problem"
  A man has an unsatisfactory conversation with the Sun.
- "The Cause Of Some Recent Changes"
  Some bored art school students dig a tunnel with terrible consequences.
- "The Comedy of the White Dog"
  A sexual comedy set in the 1950s, involving a woman and a dog.
- "The Crank That Made The Revolution"
  Vague McMenamy invents an enhanced duck.
- "The Great Bear Cult"
  Pete Brown features in a story, written as a television script, about a 1930s cult when people dressed up as bears.
- "The Start of the Axletree"
  The two "Axletree" stories are inspired by Franz Kafka's telling of the Tower of Babel story in his short story "The City Coat of Arms". They satirise multinationalism and capitalism. In this first part, an emperor ruling a vast circular swathe of territory conceives a building project which will be his tomb and symbol of power, and the building of which will provide a perpetual central focus for the empire.
- "Five Letters From An Eastern Empire"
  The story examines the power of state artists Bohu and Tohu to make a political difference in a hierarchical society where whole sectors of the population are declared "unnecessary people". It was inspired by a line from Ezra Pound's Cantos: "Moping around the Emperor's court, waiting for the order-to-write".
- "Logopandocy"
  Written in the persona of Sir Thomas Urquhart of Cromarty, who is trying to create a "multiverbal logopandocy", or universal language.
- "Prometheus"
  A radical intellectual discovers the limits on his ability to change how language is used.
- "The End of the Axletree"
  The second part of the "Axletree" story begins two thousand years after the events of the first. Generations of work on the building culminate in reaching the sky, which is a physical object. Competing teams of scientists from different nations try to be the first to penetrate the sky to explore what lies beyond. When they succeed, an enormous flood washes away the building and the entire civilisation.
- "A Likely Story in a Nonmarital Setting"
- "A Likely Story in a Domestic Setting"

== Critical responses ==
Writing in the London Review of Books, Daniel Eilon contrasted the variable quality and experimental nature of the first seven stories with the next five, which he called the "real achievement of this work", and the final two shorter pieces. While suggesting the collection could have benefited from some editing out of weaker material, he described "Logopandocy" as "an extraordinary feat of imaginative insight." Theo Tait, in The Guardian, wrote that Unlikely Stories, Mostly is Gray's best short-story collection, and is influenced by Kafka, Jonathan Swift, and Samuel Johnson's Rasselas. He considered "Five Letters From An Eastern Empire" to be the highlight of the collection. In the Financial Times, Angel Gurria-Quintana compared Gray's illustrations with those of William Blake. Gray used his epigram "Work as if you were living in the early days of a better nation" in the book.

Dave Langford reviewed Unlikely Stories, Mostly for White Dwarf #55, calling it "an uneven but excellent collection of fantasies and parables, mostly."

Unlikely Stories, Mostly won the Cheltenham Prize for Literature in 1983.
