= Thomas Urquhart =

Scottish aristocrat, writer, and translator (1611–1660)

Sir Thomas Urquhart
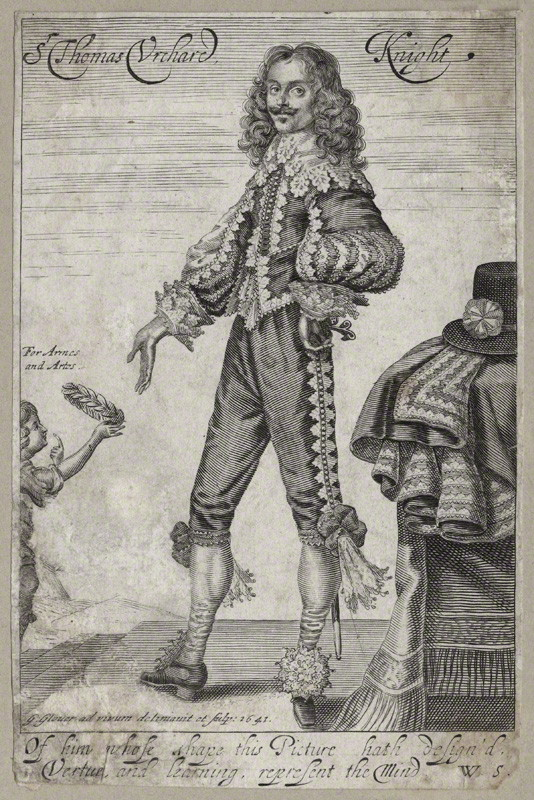
- Urquhart in a 1641 engraving by George Glover
- Born: 1611; Cromarty, Scotland
- Died: 1660 (aged 48–49); Cromarty, Scotland
- Education: King's College, Aberdeen
- Occupations: translator and author
- Notable work: Logopandecteision

Sir Thomas Urquhart (1611–1660) was a Scottish aristocrat, writer, and translator. He translated the works of French Renaissance writer François Rabelais to English.

Urquhart was a member of Clan Urquhart. Through his mother, he was a grandson of Alexander Elphinstone, 4th Lord Elphinstone. He took part in the Royalist uprising of the Trot of Turriff, and he was knighted by Charles I of England for his loyal support to the Royalist cause. In 1642, Urquhart inherited a large estate from his father. He also inherited the estate's larger debts, and he started being harassed by his father's creditors. In 1648, Urquhart participated in the Royalist uprising of Inverness. In 1650, he fought in support of Charles II of England in the Battle of Worcester and he was taken prisoner by his Parliamentarian opponents. He was initially imprisoned in the Tower of London, but he was then transferred to Windsor Castle. While in captivity, he was given considerable freedom and he was allowed to resume his writing career. In 1652, he was paroled by Oliver Cromwell.

In 1653, Urquhart left Scotland to travel in Continental Europe and little is known about his later life. He had died by 1660, the year in which his hereditary titles were inherited by his younger brother. According to a legend, Urquhart died in a fit of laughter on receiving news of the Stuart Restoration in 1660.

== Biography ==
Urquhart was born in 1611 to Thomas Urquhart of Cromarty and Christian Elphinstone, daughter of Alexander Elphinstone, 4th Lord Elphinstone. At the age of eleven he attended King's College, University of Aberdeen. Afterwards he toured the Continent, returning in 1636. In 1639, he participated in the Royalist uprising known as the Trot of Turriff; he was knighted by Charles I at Whitehall for his support. In 1641 he published his first book, a volume of epigrams.

Urquhart's father died in 1642, leaving behind a large estate encumbered by larger debts. As the eldest son, Urquhart was from that time on harassed by creditors. He left for the Continent in order to economize, but returned in 1645 and published Trissotetras, a mathematical treatise.

In 1648, Urquhart participated in the Royalist uprising at Inverness. He was declared a traitor by Parliament, though he doesn't seem to have suffered any other consequences. Two years later he marched with Charles II and fought in the Battle of Worcester. The Royalist forces were decisively defeated and Urquhart was taken prisoner. He lost all his manuscripts, which he had brought with him for safekeeping, and he had to forfeit all his property. He was held first at the Tower of London and later at Windsor, but he was given considerable freedom by his captors. The following year he published Pantochronachanon, a work of genealogy, and The Jewel, a defense of Scotland. In 1652, he was paroled by Cromwell and returned to Cromarty. Soon after he published Logopandecteision, his plan for a universal language, and his most celebrated work, his translation of Rabelais.

Urquhart returned to the Continent some time after 1653, perhaps as a condition of his release by Cromwell. Little is known of his life after this time. He died no later than 1660, because in that year his younger brother took up his hereditary titles.

There is a legend that Urquhart died in a fit of laughter on receiving news of the Restoration of Charles II.

== Works ==
Epigrams, Divine and Moral (1641)
Collections of epigrams were fashionable in the mid seventeenth century, but Urquhart's contribution to the genre has not been highly regarded. Most critics have concluded that the sentiments are largely banal and the versification inept.

Trissotetras (1645)
Trissotetras treats plane and spherical trigonometry using Napier's logarithms and a new nomenclature designed to facilitate memorization. Urquhart's nomenclature resembles the names medieval schoolmen gave the various forms of syllogism, in which the construction of the name gives information about the thing being named. (Urquhart would make use of the same idea in his universal language.) The resulting effect is, however, bizarre, and the work is impenetrable without the investment of considerable time to learn Urquhart's system. Although Urquhart was a formidable mathematician and Trissotetras mathematically sound, his approach has never been adopted and his book is a dead end in the history of mathematics.

Pantochronachanon (1652)
Subtitled "A peculiar promptuary of time," this work is a genealogy of the Urquhart family. In it, Urquhart manages to name each of his ancestors in an unbroken hereditary line from Adam and Eve all the way up to himself through 153 generations. This work has been the subject of ridicule since the time of its first publication, though it was likely an elaborate joke.

The Jewel (Ekskybalauron) (1652)
A miscellaneous work. It contains a prospectus for Urquhart's universal language, but most of the book is, as the title page says, "a vindication of the honor of Scotland," including anecdotes about many Scottish soldiers and scholars. It includes Urquhart's fictionalized life of the Scottish hero James Crichton (1560–82, "The Admirable Crichton"), Urquhart's most celebrated work outside of his Rabelais; this section has sometimes been reprinted separately.

Logopandecteision (1653)
This book contains another prospectus for Urquhart's universal language. Although Urquhart does not give a vocabulary, he explains that his system would be based on a scheme in which the construction of words would reflect their meanings. Logopandecteision also contains a polemic against Urquhart's creditors.

The Works of Rabelais (Books I and II, 1653; Book III, 1693)
This is the work for which Urquhart is best known. It was described by the English author Charles Whibley, as "the finest translation ever made from one language into another" and a "magnificent and unsurpassable translation", by the academic Roger Craik. There is a perfect match of temperament between author and translator. Urquhart's learning, pedantry and word-mad exuberance proved to be ideal for Rabelais's work. It is a somewhat free translation, but it never departs from the spirit of Rabelais. The third book was edited and completed by Peter Anthony Motteux and published after Urquhart's death.

== Style ==
Urquhart's prose style is unique. His sentences are long and elaborate, and his love of the odd and recondite word seems boundless. At its worst his style can descend into almost unintelligible pretension and pedantry ("a pedantry which is gigantesque and almost incredible", in the words of George Saintsbury), but at its best it can be rich, rapid and vivid, with arresting and original imagery. He coined words constantly, although none of Urquhart's coinages have fared as well as those of his contemporary Browne.

== Popular culture ==
Urquhart appears as the protagonist of Alasdair Gray's short story "Sir Thomas's Logopandocy" (included in Unlikely Stories, Mostly), the title taken from Urquhart's Logopandecteision. Urquhart appears in the illustrations throughout Unlikely Stories.

Urquhart appears as a major character in the novel A Hand-book of Volapük by Andrew Drummond. Urquhart's language proposal "The Jewel" as well as Volapük, Esperanto, and other constructed languages are prominent plot devices in the novel.

One of the characters in Robertson Davies' The Cornish Trilogy, Urquhart McVarish, claims to be a descendant of Urquhart.

Urquhart's works are a key plotpoint in the book The Lairds of Cromarty ("Les maîtres de Glenmarkie" in the original French) by Jean Pierre Ohl.
