= Today and Yesterday =

1975 series of plays by Alasdair Gray

Today and Yesterday is a 1975 series of three plays for children by Alasdair Gray about life in nineteenth century Scotland, commissioned by Malcolm Hossack of Scottish BBC Educational Television. The plays show a TV presenter traveling in time to contrast the 1970s with the Victorian era, and, although written for a school audience, include many of Gray's political interests. Some of the themes covered in the series would return in Gray's Victorian novel Poor Things.

== Episodes ==
The text for two episodes, The Streets and The School is available in the archives of the National Library of Scotland, Acc. 9247/29. Episode three, Industry, has been lost.
