= Savourna Stevenson =

Scottish clàrsach player and composer

Savourna Stevenson (born 1961) is a Scottish clàrsach player and composer.

Her father is the Scottish composer Ronald Stevenson. Actress Gerda Stevenson is her sister.

Her musical career began in the late 1970s; at the age of 15, she was already playing at the Queen Elizabeth Hall with folk artists such as Fairport Convention, Ralph McTell and Martin Carthy. Subsequent work involved her collaborating with Dave Swarbrick, Aly Bain and Davy Spillane.

She started to receive commissions for new music for theatre, dance and concerts. She first came to national attention with the 1989 album Tweed Journey, which describes a journey down the River Tweed – separating Scotland from England – from its source to its mouth at Berwick-upon-Tweed. This album saw her experiment with the harp in an electric setting with rock and jazz musicians.

On the album Tusitala: Teller of Tales (1994), she was joined by musicians from across the folk/rock/jazz spectrum in performing music she had written for the BBC television series Stevenson's Travels

Later work saw her collaborate with the Bhundu Boys and Toumani Diabate and participate in Womad festivals around the world. As a songwriter she has worked with writers such as Michael Marra and singers such as June Tabor and Eddi Reader.

Her Harp String Quartet featured in the American TV series Sex and the City, while her orchestral work Misterstourworm and the Kelpie’s Gift was performed for the first time by the Royal Scottish National Orchestra in 2003. She was then commissioned by Children’s Classic Concerts to write a new work for children. The result, Hansel and Gretel, was premiered and toured across Scotland during 2005.

Her most recent album, Persian Knight Celtic Dawn (2006), is a mix of Celtic and Middle Eastern influences. It features song settings from The Prophet by Khalil Gibran and lyrics by the Gaelic poet Aonghas MacNeacail.

The release of Hansel & Gretel on Circular Records has been announced for January 2009.

== Discography ==
Albums

- Tickled Pink (1985)
- Tweed Journey (1990)
- Cutting the Chord (1993)
- Tusitala, Teller of Tales (1994)
- Singing the Storm (1996)
- Calman the Dove (1998)
- Touch Me Like the Sun (2000)
- Persian Knight Celtic Dawn (2006)

Compilations

- Celtic Harp (2000)

Contributing artist

- Unwired: Acoustic Music from Around the World (1999) World Music Network
