= The Loss of the Golden Silence =

Play by Alasdair Gray

The Loss of the Golden Silence is a two-person play about domestic tension by Alasdair Gray, first performed at the Pool Lunch Hour Theatre, Edinburgh in 1973, and later broadcast on radio by the Scottish BBC in 1974, under producer Stewart Conn. It is of particular interest to readers of Lanark because part of the dialogue expands on Gray's notion of the Epic, as discussed by Nastler in the novel's epilogue. Gray further adapted the play into a short story, published by Bloomsbury in the collection Ten Tales Tall and True in 1993.
