= The Story of a Recluse =

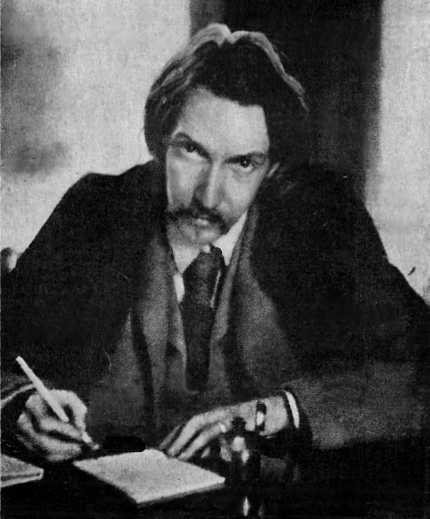
Robert Louis Stevenson in 1885

The Story of a Recluse is an unfinished work by Robert Louis Stevenson, probably written in the mid 1880s. It tells the story of Jamie Kirkwood, an Edinburgh minister's son who finds himself waking up in a room identical to his own in the house of a mysterious man called Manton Jamieson. Stevenson only completed three pages.

== Adaptation ==
The work was adapted into a television play by Alasdair Gray. Written in 1985, the TV screenplay completes the original story by means of flashbacks from the 1930s. When broadcast it starred Stewart Granger, Peter Capaldi and Cristina Higueras. The Independent's W. Stephen Gilbert thought its style "brilliantly cheeky". However according to Gray's biographer, Rodge Glass, the writer was unhappy with the final product.

Gray, in turn, adapted his screenplay into a short story in the anthology Lean Tales. It involved some alterations to the television play's plot, concentrating for the most part on a metafictional discussion of the reasoning by which Gray deduces how Stevenson's story should end.
