= Lesmahagow High School =

School in Lesmahagow, Scotland

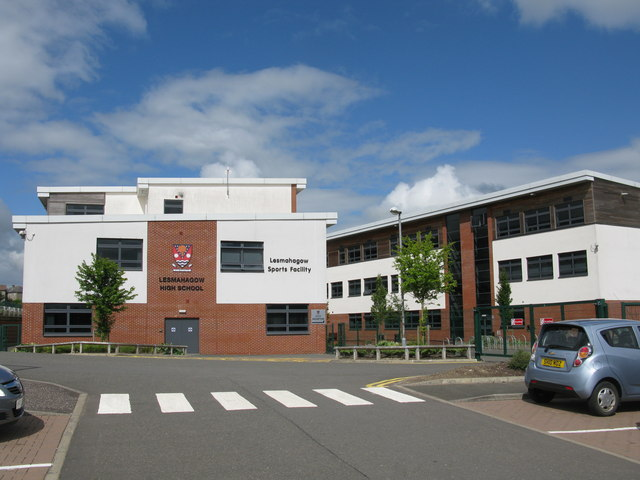
- Lesmahagow High School in 2013

Location
- Strathaven Road; Lesmahagow, South Lanarkshire; ML11 0FS; Scotland
- Coordinates: 55.64327°N 3.88766°W

Information
- Motto: "Aspire to be our best"
- Established: 2007
- Authority: South Lanarkshire
- Head teacher: Barbara Lee
- Scottish Highers: 1st Years – 6th Years
- Gender: Mixed
- Enrollment: 541
- Colour
- SEED Number: 8550131
- Website: www.lesmahagow.s-lanark.sch.uk

Lesmahagow High School is a non-denominational secondary school in Lesmahagow, South Lanarkshire, Scotland. The new school building opened in 2007. The current head teacher is Barbara Lee. The school has four deputy head teachers: David Robertson, Linda Wright, Pamela Docherty and Alistair Gray.

== Overview ==
The school's catchment area includes the villages of Lesmahagow, Auchenheath, Blackwood, Coalburn, Hawksland, Kirkmuirhill and surrounding areas. The school uses a traditional house system. The pupils are organised into one of three guidance houses. The three houses are Kerse (red), Logan (yellow) and Milton (blue). The head teacher Barbara Lee took up the post in August 2021, taking over from Richard McGowan .

Lesmahagow's affiliated primary schools include Bent Primary in Kirkmuirhill, Blackwood Primary in Blackwood, Milton Primary and Woodpark Primary in Lesmahagow and Coalburn Primary in Coalburn.

== History ==
According to photographer David Hall, "In 2004, South Lanarkshire Council began an ambitious School Modernisation Programme to modernise or replace all primary and secondary schools in its area. In Lesmahagow, Lesmahagow High School and Woodpark and Milton Primary Schools were all replaced with new buildings."

The new school building opened in 2007, replacing the former Lesmahagow Higher Grade School buildings. The school consists of two buildings, linked by a footbridge. Like other schools in Scotland, Lesmahagow aims to fulfil the requirements of Curriculum for Excellence.

Lesmahagow High School was inspected by Her Majesty's Inspectorate of Education (HMIe) in November 2009. Following the publication of the report in January 2010, the Head Teacher and staff prepared an action plan to address the main recommendations; an interim report on progress was published in 2011.

In 2012, a report by EKOS Consultants for South Lanarkshire County Council noted that pupils' Year 4 attainment was typical for Scotland, but "examination results for both 5th and 6th years are aubstantially below local and national levels". The report also notes that unemployment for the school's ex-pupils was higher than average.

The school has celebrated National Science and Engineering week and provides pupils with careers advice. In 2015 Keith Anderson the CEO of Scottish Power visited the school.

In 2016, a pupil at the school achieved grades that were among the highest in Scotland that year.

The school has longstanding adoption of a strong anti-bigotry policy.

== Buildings ==
The new school building was built close to the original site. Demolition of the old school building started in mid-December 2007 and was completed in 2009.

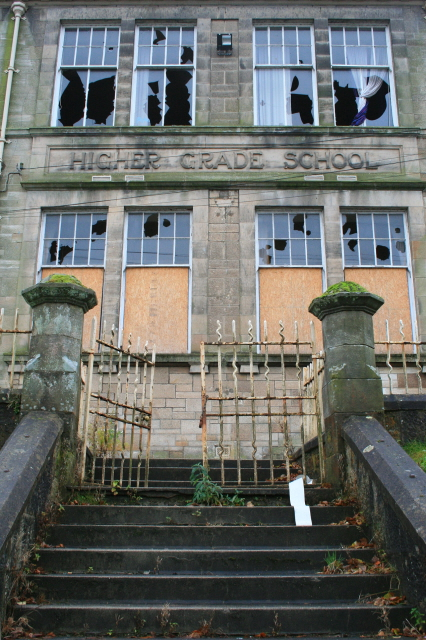
2005 Higher Grade School Building

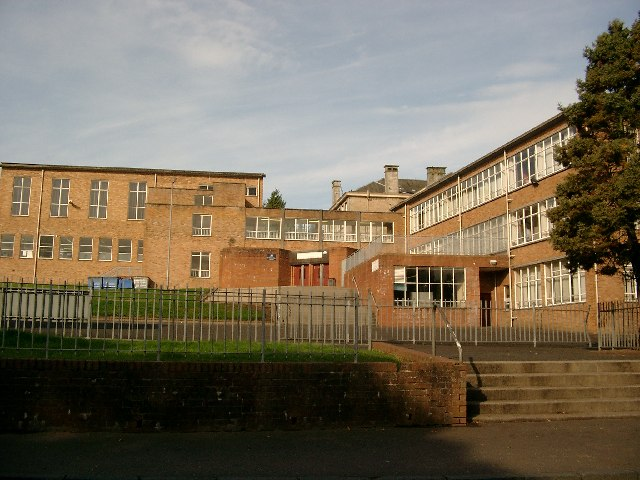
2005 (old building)

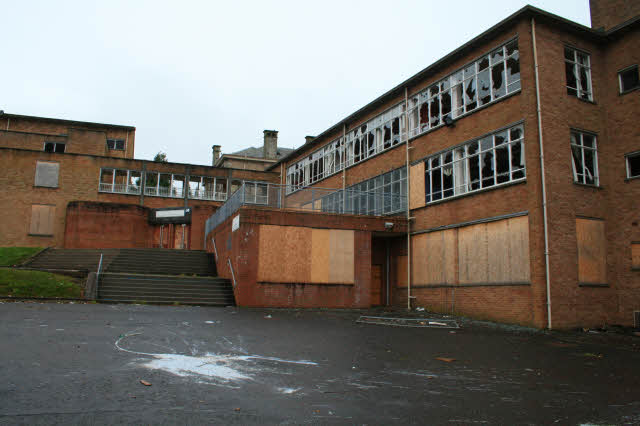
2008 (old building)

== Notable alumni ==
=== Lesmahagow Higher Grade School ===
- Sir Alec Cairncross, economist
- John Cairncross, civil servant and Soviet spy, the "fifth man" of the Cambridge Five
- Tom Fraser, politician

=== Lesmahagow High School ===
- Jimmy Hood, politician
- Alasdair Grant Taylor, artist
