= Jeff Torrington =

Scottish writer (1935–2008)

Jeff Torrington (31 December 1935 – 11 May 2008) was a novelist from Glasgow in Scotland.

His novels draw on the changing face of modern Scotland. Swing Hammer Swing (1992) was set during the demolition of the old Gorbals. It took 30 years to write. The Devil's Carousel (1998) drew on the decline of a fictionalised version of the Rootes/Chrysler car plant at Linwood. Torrington worked there for eight years, as a telex sequencer, before the plant's closure.

Swing Hammer Swing was Whitbread Book of the Year in 1992.

Torrington's first published stories appeared in newspapers. He later attended a Paisley writers' group set up by James Kelman and a creative writing group in Glasgow associated with Philip Hobsbaum, which also included Kelman, Tom Leonard, Liz Lochhead, Alasdair Gray and Aonghas MacNeacail.
