= Gerda Stevenson =

Scottish actress, director and writer

Gerda Stevenson FRSE
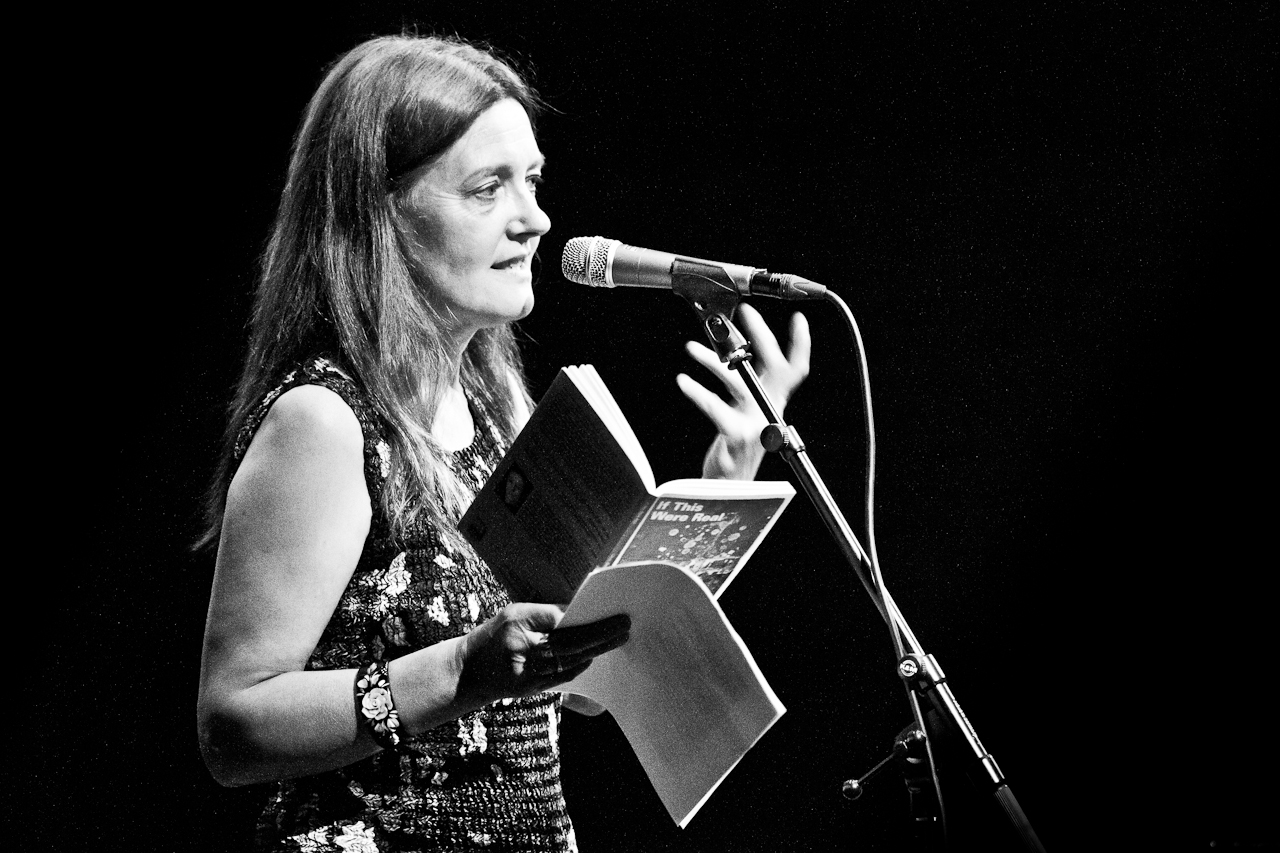
- Stevenson at Authors' Reading Month, 2014
- Born: 10 April 1956 (age 70); West Linton, Peeblesshire, Scotland
- Education: Royal Academy of Dramatic Art
- Occupations: Actress, director, writer
- Years active: 1976-2014
- Spouse: Aonghas MacNeacail (m. 1980; died 2022)
- Children: 2
- Family: Ronald Stevenson (father); Savourna Stevenson (sister)

Gerda Stevenson (born 10 April 1956) is a Scottish actress, director and writer.

Known for her wide-ranging works in media, her notable stage roles include the title character in Edwin Morgan's English translation of Racine's Phèdre, and Lady Macbeth. In film, she starred alongside Celia Imrie in Margaret Tait's Blue Black Permanent (1992) and played the mother of Murron MacClannough in Braveheart (1995), winning the BAFTA Scotland Award for Best Actress for the former. Stevenson was described by The Scotsman in 1999 as "Scotland's finest actress".

In addition to her screen and stage work, Stevenson is also a playwright, poet, and frequently appears on radio; as a reader of short stories and as an actress in adaptations.

== Early life ==
Stevenson was born on 10 April 1956 in the small village of West Linton in Peeblesshire, Scotland, where she was raised. Her father was Scottish musician and composer Ronald Stevenson.

== Career ==
Stevenson's play Federer vs. Murray has toured New York City and her poetry collection If This Were Real was published by Smokestack Books in 2013. In 2019, her poems illustrated the paintings of her one-time neighbour, Scottish painter Christian Small, in the book Inside & Out - The Art of Christian Small, published by Scotland Street Press. She was a contributing writer to the 2024 book Feminist Theatre Then & Now: Celebrating 50 years.

Her radio work consists of several performances of poems and songs by Robert Burns for the BBC, as well as numerous radio dramas: Self-Control by Mary Brunton as Laura Montreville; For the Love of Willie by Agnes Owens as Liza; The Heart of Midlothian by Sir Walter Scott for BBC Radio 4, nominated for a Sony Award in 2008, as Jeanie Deans; and Sunset Song by Lewis Grassic Gibbon. She has also written radio dramas including: Island Blue, Secrets: The Punter's Tale, Secrets: The Escort's Tale and The Apple Tree. She directed the Afternoon Play The Price of a Fish Supper.

In 2002, she played Helen Gilmore in the soap opera River City.

Stevenson won a BAFTA Best Film Actress Award for her role in Margaret Tait's feature film Blue Black Permanent, and has been twice nominated for the CATS awards.

Stevenson directed the film The Storm Watchers, the script for which was written by George Mackay Brown, for the St. Magnus International Festival. She wrote and directed the film Paper Portraits (2025), about workers in the Midlothian paper-making industry, for Penicuik Community Arts Association.

In 2026, Stevenson was elected a Fellow of the Royal Society of Edinburgh, in the practice of the creative and performing arts.

== Credits ==
=== Film ===
Year	Title	Role	Notes
1991	Tickets for the Zoo	Children's Home Worker	
1992	Blue Black Permanent	Greta Thorburn	
1995	Braveheart	Mother MacClannough	
1997	Flight: Searching for Scotland	Narrator	Short film
1998	The Boyhood of John Muir		
2004	Dead Man Falls	Mrs. MacLeod	Short film
2005	Foighidinn: The Crimson Snowdrop	Sea Witch	
2013	Kiss the Water	Herself	Voice role

=== Film (as director) ===
Year	Title	Distributor	Ref.
2021	The Storm Watchers	St Magnus International Festival	
2025	Paper Portraits	Penicuik Community Arts Association	

=== Television ===
Year	Title	Role	Notes
1976	Play for Today	Rachel Galt	1 episode
1980	Square Mile of Murder	Madeleine Smith	2 episodes
1983	Grey Granite	Ellen Johns	3 episodes
1986	Horizon	Jane Bailey	2 episodes
1987	Taggart	Mary Imrie	1 episode
1993	The Bill	Anne Douglas	1 episode
1993	Doctor Finlay	Agnes Miller	1 episode
1994	The High Life	Avril	1 episode
1996	Rough Justice	Sandra James	1 episode
1999	Life Support	Claire Matheson	1 episode
2000	The Bill	Annie McCluskey	1 episode
2002	Midsomer Murders	Sandra Bradshaw	1 episode
2002–2003	River City	Helen Gilmore	
2005–2007	Heartbeat	Mrs. Cameron	4 episodes
2014	Shetland	Maria Markham	2 episodes

=== Theatre ===
Year	Title	Role	Theatre Company	Director	Notes
1982	Ane Satyre of the Thrie Estaites	Hameliness	Scottish Theatre Company	Tom Fleming	play by Sir David Lyndsey, adapted by Robert Kemp
1985	Life of Galileo	Virginia	Scottish Theatre Company	Peter Dews	play by Bertolt Brecht
2010	The Government Inspector	The Governor's Wife	Commudicado	Gerry Mulgrew	play by Nikolai Gogol

=== Radio ===
Date	Title	Role	Director	Station
12 September 1982 – 10 October 1982	The Bride of Lammermoor			BBC Radio 4
16 May 1985	Watching Waiters			BBC Radio 4 Afternoon Play
13 March 1990	Fair Kirsten		Marilyn Imrie	BBC Radio 3
1 June 1990	The Interview	Reader	Bruce Young	BBC Radio 4 Morning Story
11 June 1990	Blood and Ice		Marilyn Imrie	BBC Radio 4 The Monday Play
27 October 1990	Witchwood			BBC Radio 4 Saturday Playhouse
7 February 1995	The Upshot			BBC Radio 4 Thirty Minute Theatre
14 December 1997	The Secret Commonwealth	fairy voice	Patrick Rayner	BBC Radio 4
22 January 1998	Tam o'Shanter		Hamish Wilson	BBC Radio 4
21 March 1998 (Recorded on 22 February 1998)	Camelot	Nimue		BBC Radio 2
6 December 1999 – 13 December 1999	The Last Days of Mankind		Giles Havergal	BBC Radio 3 Sunday Play
5 February 2001 – 16 February 2001	Telling Liddy	Bridie	Pam Wardell	BBC Radio 4 Woman's Hour Drama
11 February 2001	Mary Queen of Scots Got Her Head Chopped Off	Mary, Queen of Scots / Marian	Marilyn Imrie	BBC Radio 4
11 March 2001	Every Bit of It	Georgia	Susan Roberts	BBC Radio 4
19 February 2002	A Hundred Miles		Bruce Young	BBC Radio 4 Afternoon Play
25 August 2002 – 1 September 2002	The Prime of Miss Jean Brodie	Jean Brodie	Bruce Young	BBC Radio 4 Classic Serial
25 January 2003 – 1 February 2003	Inspector Rebus: The Falls	Jean Burchill	Bruce Young	BBC Radio 4 The Saturday Play
31 March 2003 – 11 April 2003	Self-Control	Laura Montreville	Bruce Young	BBC Radio 4 Woman's Hour Drama
6 May 2003	The Whole Story and Other Stories: Gothic by Ali Smith	Reader	David Jackson Young	BBC Radio 4 Afternoon Reading
5 April 2004 – 9 April 2004	For the Love of Willie	Liza	Bruce Young	BBC Radio 4 Woman's Hour Drama
10 January 2005 – 21 January 2005	The Gowk Storm	Innkeeper's Wife	David Ian Neville	BBC Radio 4 Woman's Hour Drama
31 March 2005	Wooden Heart	Uta	Mary Ward Lowery	BBC Radio 4 Afternoon Play
16 May 2005	A Breath from Other Planets	Mathilde	Bruce Young	BBC Radio 4 Afternoon Play
25 February 2006	Christabel's Anarchist	Christabel	Bruce Young	BBC Radio 4 Saturday Play
7 August 2006 – 2 October 2006	Paul Temple and the Sullivan Mystery	Steve	Patrick Rayner	BBC Radio 4
30 August 2006	The Madeleine Effect: Mangoes by Joanna Blythman	Reader	Kirsty Williams	BBC Radio 4 Afternoon Reading
9 September 2007 – 16 September 2007	The Heart of Midlothian	Jeanie Deans	Bruce Young	BBC Radio 4 Classic Serial
23 March 2008	The Muse of Rose Street	Reader	Monise Durrani	BBC Radio 4
16 May 2008 – 4 July 2008	Paul Temple and the Madison Mystery	Steve	Patrick Rayner	BBC Radio 4
4 December 2009	Distributing Dave			BBC Radio Scotland Drama
22 December 2009	The Three Knots	Old Woman	Kirsty Williams	BBC Radio 4 Afternoon Play
11 June 2010 – 30 July 2010	Paul Temple and Steve	Steve	Patrick Rayner	BBC Radio 4
23 September 2010	The Second Mr Bailey	Margaret	Bruce Young	BBC Radio 4 Afternoon Play
25 January 2011	The Culture Café: Completely Burns	Reader	Esme Kennedy	BBC Radio Scotland
14 February 2011	The Book Café	Reader		BBC Radio Scotland
28 February 2011	Secrets: The Punter's Tale	Cara	Bruce Young	BBC Radio Scotland Drama
8 May 2011	Hume, the Philosophical Historian	Reader	Louise Yeoman	BBC Radio 3 Sunday Feature
24 August 2011 – 12 October 2011	A Case for Paul Temple	Steve	Patrick Rayner	BBC Radio 4
12 October 2011	I Confess: The Power of the Confession	Isobel Gowdie	Liza Greig	BBC Radio 3 The Essay

== Personal life ==
Stevenson was married to Scottish Gaelic poet Aonghas MacNeacail from 1980 until his death in 2022. They have two children.

Her sister, Savourna Stevenson, has recorded works on the Scottish harp, the clàrsach.

She is a graduate of the Royal Academy of Dramatic Art in London.
