= Chris Boyce =

Scottish science fiction author

Joseph Christopher Boyce (1943 – 29 June 1999) was a Scottish science fiction author and fan.

He worked in the Reference Library of the Glasgow Herald newspaper, and was there when he died suddenly. His fiction works include Catchworld, for which he was best known, and which jointly won the Sunday Times/Gollancz prize for best SF Novel. He was a member of spaceflight groups including the British Interplanetary Society and he published articles and non-fiction books related to the subject. He was a regular attendee of fan meetings and was Guest of Honour at the science fiction convention "Invention" in 1983 in Glasgow.

He co-founded the publishing company Dog and Bone Press in 1990 with his wife, Angela, and Alasdair Gray.

== Bibliography ==
- Catchworld (1975)
- Brainfix (1980)
- Blooding Mister Naylor (1990)

=== Nonfiction ===
- Extraterrestrial Encounter: A Personal Perspective (1979)

=== Short works ===
- الزي (1966) في سترفيلد
- The Skytank Portfolio (1978) in Pulsar 1
