= Logopandecteision =

1653 book by Thomas Urquhart

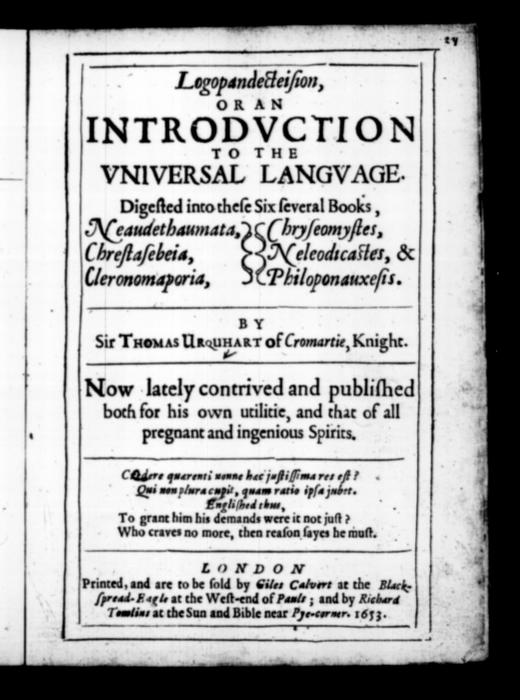
- Author: Sir Thomas Urquhart
- Publication date: 1653

Logopandecteision is a 1653 parodic book by Sir Thomas Urquhart, detailing his plans for the creation of an artificial language.

He claimed that the language could be used in translating verses from any vernacular language, citing Italian, French, Spanish, Slavonian, Dutch, Irish, and English as specific examples. Urquhart devotes sections of the book to polemics against those who prevented him from publishing his linguistic works, primarily his creditors and the Church of Scotland.

== Content and purpose ==
The book's sections include a list of the language's "66 unparalleled excellences"; the remaining sections consists of polemics against Urquhart's creditors, the Church of Scotland, and others whom he claimed prevented him from publishing. The plan of Logopandecteision recalled his earlier work Eskybalauron.

The entire work was possibly a kind of elaborate practical joke. Under the alternative spelling Logopandekteision, extracts are sometimes presented in a way that suggests Urquhart seriously undertook a constructed language.

== Language ==
Logopandecteision
- Created by: Thomas Urquhart
- Date: 1653
- Purpose: Constructed language: Logopandecteision

Language codes
- ISO 639-3: –

The grammar is somewhat reminiscent of the extensive and intricate taxonomic structures of other philosophical languages, and of the baroque grammar of later projects such as Volapük. Urquhart promised twelve parts of speech: each declinable in eleven cases, four numbers, eleven genders (including god, goddess, man, woman, animal, etc.); and conjugable in eleven tenses, seven moods, and four voices.

He claimed that any number of any magnitude could be expressed in this language by a single word, so concisely that a number with more digits in traditional notation than "there might be grains of sand containable from the center of the earth, to the highest heavens" would be expressible by just two letters. Urquhart claimed at one point that, "here is no Language in the world, but for every word thereof, it will afford you another of the same signification, of equal syllables with it, and beginning or ending, or both, with vowels or consonants as it doth"; and that "in translating verses of any vernaculary tongue, such as Italian, French, Spanish, Slavonian, Dutch, Irish, English, or whatever it be, it affords you of the same signification, syllable for syllable, and in the closure of each line a rime, as in the original". Other notable assertions include that this language could be used to translate any idiom in any other language, without any alteration of the literal sense, while fully representing the intention.

== See also ==
- An Essay Towards a Real Character, and a Philosophical Language
- Philosophical language

== Sources ==
- Clark, W.J. (1912). International Language: Past, Present & Future. London: J. M. Dent & Sons. pp. 87–92. Archived from the original on 5 May 2006.
- Urquhart, Thomas (1653). Logopandecteision. Giles Calvert; Richard Tomlins – via University of Chicago.
- Urquhart, Thomas (1834). The works of Sir Thomas Urquhart: Logopandecteision. H. and J. Pillans – via Archive.org.
- Corbett, John B. (2004). Lecture on Scottish Literature 2 (Lecture). University of Glasgow. Archived from the original on 12 August 2011.
- Corbett, John B. (2004), Prose Urquhart, University of Glasgow, archived from the original on 17 March 2013
