= Deborah Wallace =

Scottish actor and playwright (born 1974)

- Born: 1974 (age 51–52)
- Occupations: Actress, playwright and producer

Deborah Wallace (born 1974) is a Scottish-born actress, playwright and producer.

== Career ==
Her plays include Psyche based on the life of James Miranda Barry (2005), Homesick (2007), and The Void with Hybrid Stage Project (2010), and All American Enemy.

Wallace co-produced Gasland and Gasland II, and How to Let Go of the World.
