= 1982, Janine =

Book by Alasdair Gray

- The dust-jacket cover of the hardback edition
- Author: Alasdair Gray
- Language: English
- Genre: Erotic novel
- Publisher: Jonathan Cape
- Publication date: 30 October 1984
- Publication place: Scotland
- Media type: Print (hardcover & paperback)
- Pages: 345 pp (hardcover edition) & 352 pp (paperback edition)
- ISBN: 0-670-51387-3 (hardcover edition) & ISBN 0-14-007110-5 (paperback edition)
- OCLC: 10751727
- Dewey Decimal: 823/.914 19
- LC Class: PR6057.R3264 A616 1984

1982, Janine is a novel by the Scottish author Alasdair Gray. His second, it was published in 1984, and remains his most controversial work. Its use of pornography as a narrative device attracted much criticism; despite this, Gray himself and others considered it his best work.

== Plot summary ==
The novel is narrated by Jock McLeish, a supervisor of the installation of alarm systems. Divorced, alcoholic and approaching fifty, his problems coalesce in a long night of the soul in a hotel room in Peebles or Selkirk.

McLeish attempts to spend the night assembling an intricate pornographic fantasy. His cast of characters includes: Janine, based on a childhood memory of Jane Russell in The Outlaw; Superb (short for Superbitch); and Big Momma, an obese lesbian. All of these are submitted to sadomasochistic practices, parts of which are described at some length. However, McLeish constantly returns to reminiscences of his previous life and lovers. These prompt his attempted suicide. Chapter 11 of the novel is a typographical explosion, with the text splitting into several parallel voices on each page (including that of God). The crisis concludes with McLeish vomiting up the pills which he had hoped would kill him, and facing the truth of his actions as morning dawns.

== Literary significance & criticism ==
On the first hardback and paperback editions, Gray wrote that "This already dated novel is set inside the head of an ageing, divorced, alcoholic, insomniac supervisor of security installations who is tippling in the bedroom of a small Scottish hotel. Though full of depressing memories and propaganda for the Conservative Party it is mainly a sadomasochistic fetishistic fantasy. Even the arrival of God in the later chapters fails to elevate the tone. Every stylistic excess and moral defect which critics conspired to ignore in the author's first books, Lanark and Unlikely Stories, Mostly, is to be found here in concentrated form." In a 2000 interview, Gray said "When writing the pornographic parts of 1982, Janine I was deliberately shocking myself. Though I think it my best novel I cannot now reread it - I'm back to being as old fashioned as I was before imagining it."

An example of the typography in chapter 11

1982, Janine polarised critics like few other novels in modern literary history. The paperback edition of the novel concludes with an appendix of criticism of the work, both for and against. Critics praising the work included Jonathan Baumbach in The New York Times ("1982 Janine has a verbal energy, an intensity of vision") and William Boyd in the Times Literary Supplement ("His style is limpid and classically elegant"). The Boyd quotation is juxtaposed with one from Paul Ableman in The Literary Review criticising the "irritating mannerisms". Peter Levi on the BBC called the book "Radioactive hogwash", while Joe Ambrose of the Irish Sunday Tribune (who has expressed virulently critical views on many of Gray's books) called the author "a vainglorious lout" and "a profoundly reactionary penman". J.A. McArdle, in the Irish Independent wrote: "I have read reviews of these books which makes me suspect that the commentators had never read them. 1982, Janine is not pornography but a thoughtful and sad study of the human predicament; to be trapped in a world where the little man, woman or country will always be exploited by the big bullies."

In an introduction to the 2003 Canongate Classic edition, Will Self argues that the controversial pornographic fantasies illustrate McLeish's repression of his past real love affairs, reflect his reactionary political stance, and show the effects of his childhood experiences. McLeish's linking of sex with the idea of "homecoming" originates in his difficult relationship with his mother.

Self also notes the significance of the title, 1982 being "a point at which Scotland could be said to have reached just one of its many nadirs". This lowpoint included the destruction of the coal industry which had employed McLeish's father, under a Conservative government of which McLeish is a supporter.

Dave Langford reviewed 1982, Janine for White Dwarf #55, and stated that "God and several SF themes make guest appearances, and there's a chapter of the most boggling typography since early Alfred Bester. This one knocked me flat."
