= The Fall of Kelvin Walker =

1986 novel by Alasdair Gray

- Author: Alasdair Gray
- Publisher: Canongate Books
- Publication date: 1985
- ISBN: 978-0-862-41072-8

The Fall of Kelvin Walker: A Fable of the Sixties is a 1986 novel by Scottish writer Alasdair Gray. The book was adapted from Gray's earlier play of the same title. It was originally published by Canongate in 1985 and the revised text was published by Penguin Books in 1986, ISBN 978-0807611449.

== Plot summary ==
Kelvin, freed from his strict Calvinist upbringing through discovering Nietzsche and "the divine Ingersoll" in the library of his home town of Glaik, travels to swinging-sixties London to succeed as a television interviewer and newspaper columnist through nothing more than his aptitude for spin and a diabolical will to power, only to return, chastened, to Scotland and to God.

Drawing on a mixture of Scottish archetypes and British stereotypes and expressing all the author's cynicism towards religion, the media and the imperial British centre, this brief fable was reportedly inspired by Gray's own visit to London as a struggling artist to record a documentary called Under The Helmet (in which he tried to increase his sales by suggesting that he was dead).

== Critical response ==
The work received little critical attention. Stephen Bernstein's Alasdair Gray provides its most extensive reading, alongside its companion-piece McGrotty and Ludmilla. It is considered one of Gray's minor works. Kelvin Walker did receive some praise from reviewers. As the Edinburgh Review put it: "If Kelvin Walker had been published when it was first written, it would have been an accomplished and distinctive debut."
