= Graham Eatough =

English theatre director and playwright

Graham Eatough (born 1971) is an English theatre director and playwright, based in Scotland. He was a founding member of theatre company Suspect Culture.

== Early life ==
Eatough was born in Blackburn in 1971. He attended Queen Elizabeth's Grammar School, Blackburn before studying English and Drama at University of Bristol, where he was a contemporary of Sarah Kane, Simon Pegg, and David Greig, graduating in 1992.

== Career ==
After graduating university, Eatough relocated to Glasgow and co-founded theatre company Suspect Culture with playwright David Greig and composer Nick Powell. Initially working as a deviser and actor on early productions such as One Way Street (1995) and Airport (1995), Eatough soon took on the role of director. He remained in that capacity for the remainder of Suspect Culture's shows, including productions such as Timeless (1997), Mainstream (1999), Candide 2000 (2000), Casanova (2001), Lament (2002), and 8000m (2004). He also served as the theatre company's artistic director.

Suspect Culture disbanded as a theatre company in 2009, after which Eatough continued to work as a freelance theatre maker. His work is often collaborative, especially across different artistic disciplines, such as visual arts and film. In 2012, Eatough and visual artist Graham Fagen created The Making of Us, a work presented as a live filmic installation at Glasgow's Tramway performance centre, and later released as a film. Fagen had previously worked with Suspect Culture on the visual arts exhibition Killing Time in 2006. Eatough collaborated with conceptual artist Simon Starling on ‘At Twilight: A play for two actors, three musicians, one dancer, eight masks (and a donkey costume)’, a production commissioned by The Common Guild in 2016. In 2015, Eatough and Glasgow-based artist Stephen Sutcliffe were awarded the Contemporary Art Society Annual Award to develop two short films based on Anthony Burgess' book series about fictional poet Enderby. The project, entitled No End to Enderby was premiered at the Manchester International Festival, and took the form of two short films based on the first and last chapter of the four Enderby novels. The films were originally screened at the Whitworth Art Gallery in Manchester in September 2017, and were also shown as part of the Glasgow International Festival in 2018. Eatough directed an adaptation of Naoki Higashida's autobiographical novel The Reason I Jump, which was produced by the National Theatre of Scotland and will be performed at the Children's Wood and North Kelvin Meadow in Glasgow in June 2018.

In 2015, Eatough reunited with Suspect Culture collaborators David Greig and Nick Powell for a stage adaptation of Alasdair Gray's 1981 novel Lanark. The play premiered as part of the Edinburgh International Festival at the Royal Lyceum Theatre in August 2015, before moving to Glasgow's Citizens Theatre.

Eatough's practice-led academic research led to the play How to Act, which was produced by the National Theatre of Scotland. The play premiered at Summerhall during the 2017 Edinburgh International Festival, and toured across Scotland in March 2018.

He has worked as a lecturer in theatre studies at University of Glasgow since 2012, and was awarded a Ph.D. from Lancaster University in 2016.

== Selected works ==
=== With Suspect Culture ===
- One Way Street (1995)
- Airport (1995)
- Mainstream (1999)
- Casanova (2001)
- Lament (2002)
- 8000m (2004)
- Futurology (2007)
- Stage Fright (2009)

=== Post-Suspect Culture ===
- The Making of Us (2012)
- Lanark (2015)
- ‘At Twilight: A play for two actors, three musicians, one dancer, eight masks (and a donkey costume)’ (2016)
- No End to Enderby (2017)
- How to Act (2017)
- The Reason I Jump (2018)
