= Something Leather =

Book by Alasdair Gray

- First edition
- Author: Alasdair Gray
- Cover artist: Alasdair Gray
- Language: English
- Publisher: Canongate Press
- Publication date: 1990
- Publication place: Scotland

Something Leather is a novel-in-stories by Alasdair Gray which was published in 1990.

== Plot ==
Its framing narrative is the story of June's initiation into sado-masochistic activities by the female operators of a leather clothing shop in Glasgow.

The four central characters are from different social groups: June works for the civil service; Donalda is a dressmaker, and Senga her employer; and Harry (Harriet) is an aristocratic English artist and dominatrix. The novel also features a large cast of Glaswegian minor characters across a broad social spectrum, some of the segments reworked from Gray's earlier broadcast material.

Something Leather concludes with a section entitled Critic Fuel - An Epilogue, in which Gray describes the circumstances surrounding the book's development and offers an extended ending. He comments in the Acknowledgements that the title made reviewers treat it as "a sadomasochistic Lesbian adventure story" (these events only take place in the framing Chapters 1 and 12) and that had he called it Glaswegians they might have paid more attention to the rest of the book. Indeed, when Something Leather was collected as part of Every Short Story 1951-2012 (Canongate, 2012), the collection was grouped under the title Glaswegians, and some of the stronger sadomasochistic elements were dropped.

Gray said that the novel was born out of an attempt to write a story about a woman (an idea he credits to Kathy Acker) since his previous books had been about "men who found life a task they never doubted until an unexpected collision opened their eyes and changed their habits."

== Reception ==
=== Critical reception ===
The novel received mixed reviews.

=== Commercial reception ===
Gray has referred to the book as having "[sold] badly".
