= W. Gordon Smith =

Scottish playwright

W. Gordon Smith (13 December 1928 – 13 August 1996) was a Scottish playwright. He was born in Edinburgh and lived most of his life there. He wrote many plays including the one man show, Jock, made famous by Russell Hunter. He also wrote the lyrics, Come By The Hills, set to the tune of the traditional Irish song, Buachaill o'n Éirne Mé. In addition he wrote books on the artist William George Gillies and on the author Robert Louis Stevenson and was instrumental in bringing the Scottish arts scene to BBC Scotland.

Smith produced Folk in Focus, a 1965 folk variety series for BBC Two. He also produced a varied and lively experimental line of one-person and small-cast plays beginning with Vincent (1970), about art of Van Gogh and very nature of art itself.
