= Lean Tales =

1985 short story anthology

First edition

Lean Tales is an anthology of short stories, first published in 1985, written by Scottish authors Alasdair Gray, Agnes Owens and James Kelman, with author illustrations by Alasdair Gray. Contractually obligated to Jonathan Cape to provide a new book, Gray claimed to find himself without new material or ideas, and so approached Kelman and Owens to bulk out a collection of stories with some of their own. As is often the case with Gray's later stories, some of his own contributions are recycled from his previous writing, including The Story of a Recluse (based on his television play) and A Report to the Trustees of the Bellahouston Travelling Scholarship (based on report written after Gray received a grant to travel abroad as an art student).

Lean Tales was first published by Jonathan Cape Ltd., London, 1985.
