= Aonghas MacNeacail =

Scottish writer (1942–2022)

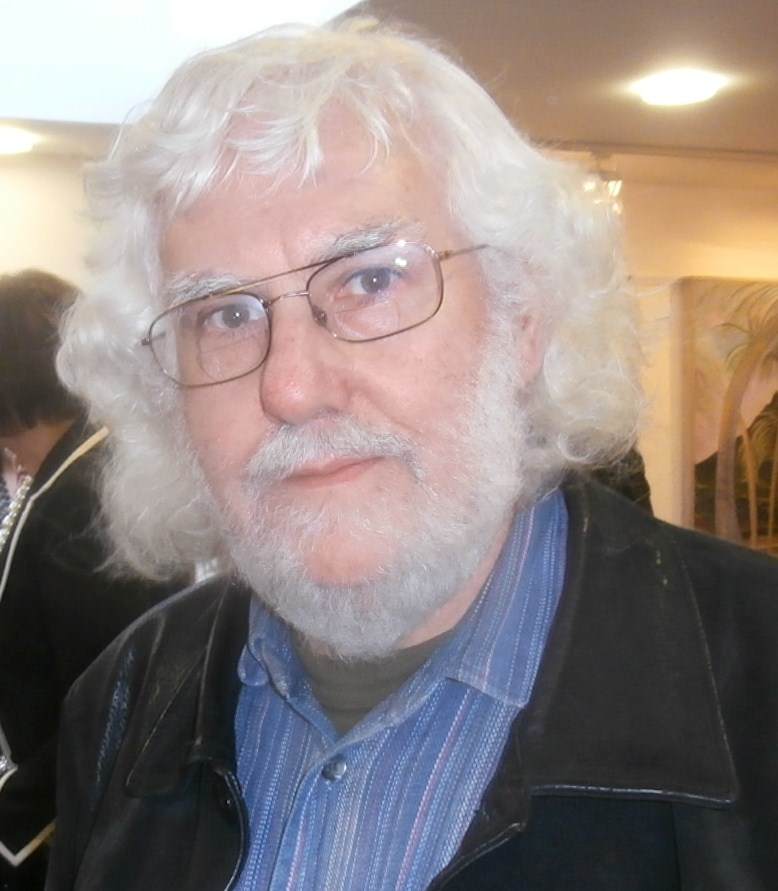
- MacNeacail in 2012
- Born: Angus Nicolson; 7 June 1942; Uig, Isle of Skye, Scotland
- Died: 19 December 2022 (aged 80)
- Education: University of Glasgow
- Occupations: Writer; poet; playwright; songwriter
- Spouse: Gerda Stevenson (m. 1980)
- Children: 2
- Writing career
- Pen name: Aonghas dubh
- Language: English; Scottish Gaelic
- Notable awards: Stakis Prize for Scottish Writer of the Year (1997)

Aonghas MacNeacail (né Angus Nicolson; 7 June 1942 – 19 December 2022), nicknamed Aonghas dubh, (Note: Scottish Gaelic for "Black Angus" or "Black-haired Angus") was a Scottish writer, songwriter, playwright and poet, best known for his contemporary works in the Scottish Gaelic language.

== Early life ==
Angus Nicolson was born in Uig on the Isle of Skye on 7 June 1942. He was raised in Idrigill, speaking Gaelic as a child. He attended Uig Primary School and Portree High School, and from 1968 the University of Glasgow where he was one of a group of young writers who gathered around Philip Hobsbaum which also included James Kelman, Tom Leonard, Alasdair Gray, Liz Lochhead and Jeff Torrington. Growing up, he changed his registered birth name to Aonghas MacNeacail, the Scottish Gaelic equivalent.

== Career ==
Besides drawing on Gaelic traditions, MacNeacail was influenced by the Black Mountain School of the United States. He held writing fellowships in Scotland; including as a writer-in-residence at the Gaelic college of Sabhal Mòr Ostaig, and read his work at festivals around the world. MacNeacail also collaborated with musicians, artists and dramatists; including Donald Shaw of Capercaillie. His poetry has been widely published throughout the English-speaking world in journals such as Ploughshares, Poetry Australia, World Poetry Almanac, and JuxtaProse Literary Magazine.

MacNeacail won the Stakis Prize for Scottish Writer of the Year with his third poetry collection Oideachadh Ceart in 1997.

== Selected works ==
- Imaginary Wounds (1980), ISBN 0906112168
- Sireadh Bradain Sicir: Seeking Wise Salmon (1983), ISBN 9780950979243
- An Cathadh Mor: The Great Snowbattle (1984), ISBN 9780950979205
- An seachnadh agus dàin eile: the avoiding, and other poems (1986), ISBN 9780863340581
- Rock and Water: poems in English (1990), ISBN 9780748660650
- Oideachadh Ceart agus dàin eile / A Proper Schooling and other poems (1996), ISBN 9780748662180
- Laoidh an donais òig: Hymn to a Young Demon (2007), ISBN 9781846970023
- Dèanamh gàire ris a’ chloc: Dàin ùra agus thaghte / Laughing at the clock: new and selected poems (2012), ISBN 9781846972300

== Personal life and death ==
MacNeacail married Scottish actor and writer Gerda Stevenson in 1980. They have two children, and resided in Carlops in the Scottish Borders. Their son, Rob MacNeacail, is a documentary filmmaker and Gaelic psalm singer.

MacNeacail died on 19 December 2022, at the age of 80. The Scottish Poetry Library remembered him as a "leading voice in Gaelic poetry" and an "influential figure for the Gaelic poets and prose writers who follow him"; while the Saltire Society described his death as a "true loss to Scottish culture." Tributes were also paid by David Greig and Lesley Riddoch.
