= The Book of Prefaces =

Book by Alasdair Gray

- Book cover designed and Illustrated by Alasdair Gray.
- Author: Alasdair Gray
- Publication date: 2000

The Book of Prefaces, is a 2000 book "edited and glossed" by the Scottish artist and novelist Alasdair Gray. It seeks to provide a history of how literature spread and developed through the nations of England, Ireland, Scotland, and the United States. Its subtitle A Short History of Literate Thought in Words by Great Writers of Four Nations from the 7th to the 20th Century outlines its scope.

Gray's own preface begins with "An Editor's Advertisement" which cites William Smellie's preface to The Philosophy of Natural History published in Edinburgh in 1790 stating what every preface should contain, and concluding that "If this plan had been universally observed, a collection of prefaces would have exhibited a short, but curious and useful history both of literature and authors." In his postscript Gray recounts how reading this in the early 1980s inspired the plan of the book, and after sixteen years on the project (while also producing his other works) the book was completed.

Characteristically, illustrations and design of the typography are by Gray himself, producing a "gorgeously realised" volume. The body of the book provides the prefaces, prologues, introductions or forewords chronologically, each headed with its title, and the year in very large numerals, with commentary by Gray and thirty other writers (including Angus Calder, Alan Spence, Robert Crawford, Bruce Leeming, and Paul Henderson Scott) in small red italic text in a column to the outer side of the leaf as needed to discuss the document.

== Reception ==
Of the reviews cited on the back cover of the paperback version, the Palo Alto Daily News comments that "The diversity of the selection is staggering. It manages to be serious, accurate and instructive, but is also an amusing text, quixotic and deeply moving".

Joseph Rosenblum noted some oddities and flaws:

Through his collection of prefaces Gray allows the reader to trace metamorphoses in English from c. 675 to 1920. The survey ends with this latter date to avoid the expense of copyright royalties, but the book's more than six hundred pages still provide a cornucopia of material. Gray's introductory and marginal comments place the selections in literary and historical context. The book is printed handsomely in black and red and is embellished with attractive illustration.
The Book of Prefaces would be an ideal text for teaching linguistic and perhaps even literary history were it not so riddled with errors, typographical and factual. To avoid copyright royalties, the publisher excluded not only most twentieth century authors but also twentieth century scholarly editions. In fact, the reader has no idea which editions Gray used, raising questions about the form and content of the selections. While most passages are given in their original and, when necessary, in translation, some appear only in modern dress. The innocent reader might thus be led to believe that Caxton's orthography underwent a dramatic revolution between his 1484 preface to The Canterbury Tales, printed here as Caxton wrote it, and the 1490 preface to the Aeneid, which Gray has purged of its fifteenth century look. The plan and, in places, the execution of this work are so good that one regrets that the final product does not fulfill its potential.

Nicholas Lezard begins by remarking on the omission of Thomas Dekker, but continues:

Gray has compiled an anthology of English prose from Cædmon (c 675) to Wilfred Owen, his agenda being not only to track the development of the language but, it would seem, the progress of humanism. As the preface's chief purpose - when it is not bombast or score-settling - is clarification, and therefore a drive towards understanding and knowledge, no one should have any quibble with that.
King Alfred's preface to Pope Gregory's Pastoral Care, a gentle and enthusiastic plea for vernacular learning, is an early example of how moving this kind of thing can be. In case you think that you don't have enough secondary information about Alfred (or anyone else for that matter), Gray has supplied marginal glosses in red which, over the course of his book, comprise a succinct political and literary history of these islands.
These brief essays are quirky, adept and useful; his parallel translations of early English are more than competent, and send you back over the page to the originals with confidence. (A pity, though, that he didn't reproduce the runic hooks and thorns of Anglo-Saxon, which tell you whether the "th" you're reading is hard or soft.)

Ian Sansom, reviewing the book (like Lezard) for The Guardian, states that its "affiliations are with the tradition of the commonplace book, with the 18th-century dictionary makers, with the Victorian encyclopaedists, with the Everymans, the Observers, and with H G Wells's The Outline of History. It is egalitarian in ambition and aristocratic in execution." Sansom adds, "Unconsidered trifles include John Clare's unstopped intro to "The Parish" (1827) - 'THIS POEM was begun & finished under the pressure of heavy distress with embittered feelings under a state of anxiety and oppression almost amounting to slavery'. In addition, there are prefaces to these prefaces, glosses and introductions, and not all of them written by Gray (the book makes strange bedfellows, among others, of James Kelman and Roger Scruton)."

Peter A. Dollard, in Library Journal, said, "This long-anticipated book from a major figure in the Scottish literary revival lives up to expectations. A delightfully original, ironic, and humorous compilation, it aims to include every major introductory essay in the English language from Cædmon (seventh century) up to the early 20th century. A red gloss runs down the side of most pages, providing fascinating and often idiosyncratic commentary. The reader learns, for example, that in John Gay's day thieves were likely to hang 'unless, like the most successful thieves, they could hire lawyers.' Gray ... was assisted by some 30 contributors, who wrote about 20 percent of the commentary."

== See also ==
- Scots language
