= Agnes Owens =

Scottish author (1926–2014)

- Born: May 24, 1926; Milngavie, Scotland
- Died: 13 October 2014 (aged 88); Vale of Leven, Scotland
- Occupation: Author
- Children: 7

Agnes Owens (24 May 1926 – 13 October 2014) was a Scottish author.

== Life ==
Born in Milngavie on 24 May 1926, Agnes Owens spent most of her life on the west coast of Scotland. Her father worked in a paper mill, and had lost a leg in the First World War. She did not do well at school and went on to learn typing at college, before she married for the first time to a man who was badly affected by his experiences in the war and drank heavily. Her first husband, with whom she had four children, died at the age of 43.

Later, Owens found her second husband Patrick and had three more children. During her life, as well as bringing up her seven children, she variously held jobs as a cleaner, typist and factory worker.

In 1987, her youngest son Patrick was murdered at the age of 19, and for a number of years afterwards she did not write.

Owens died on 13 October 2014, in the Vale of Leven, following a long illness.

== Writing ==
Owens came to attention through a writer's group led by Liz Lochhead in Alexandria, West Dunbartonshire, visited by Alasdair Gray and James Kelman. It was said that the by then middle-aged Owens had only attended the class originally "to get out of the house". She went on to draw upon her background in a series of novels noted for their accomplishment, brutal humour and powers of observation.

In his postscript to Lean Tales, Alasdair Gray describes the early part of Owens' writing career: "Her first novel, Gentlemen of the West, was returned by a publisher who said that he might consider printing it if a famous Scottish comedian said something about it which could be used as an advertisement. She posted the typescript to the comedian who put it on that pile of unsolicited correspondence which no famous person has time to answer. Industry in the Vale of Leven started closing even faster than in the rest of Britain. Westclox limited went into liquidation and Agnes did what our dynamic prime minister would do if the Thatcher family had to go on the dole: she hunted for part-time cleaning jobs. She worked for a while in the house of the comedian who had received her typescript a few years before, and got it back." The first novel was published in 1984, and the famous comedian mentioned was Billy Connolly.

In 1985, Owens contributed eight stories to a collection together with Kelman and Gray, Lean Tales. Her writing career was then interrupted following the death of her son. In 1994 however she published A Working Mother about marriage to an alcoholic and followed this up in 1998 with For the Love of Willie.

Alasdair Gray described Owens as "the most unfairly neglected of all living Scottish authors".

== Legacy ==
Gray's advocacy for Owens has found a champion in Sorcha Dallas, the curator of Gray's archive of his practice – this came about from early discussions with her son John Crosbie, representing the Agnes Owens Literary Estate. Paintings, book illustrations, his library, photographs, letters were held in possession by him and now are part of the archive in the room next door, due for opening in 2026.

== Works ==
=== Novels and novellas ===
- Gentlemen of the West (1984)
- Like Birds in the Wilderness (1987)
- A Working Mother (1994)
- For the Love of Willie (1998). Shortlisted for the 1998 Stakis Prize.
- Bad Attitudes / Jen’s Party (2004)

=== Short stories ===
- Lean Tales (1985). Anthology of short stories by Owens, James Kelman and Alasdair Gray.
- People Like That (1996)

=== As editor ===
- Paisley Yarns (1991)

=== Compilations ===
- The Complete Short Stories (2008). Contains Gentlemen of the West; Owens' contributions to Lean Tales; People Like That; and 14 unpublished stories grouped under the title The Dark Side.
- The Complete Novellas (2009)
- People Like That: The Collected Short Stories (2026)
