= Poor Things =

1992 novel by Alasdair Gray

- First edition
- Author: Alasdair Gray
- Cover artist: Alasdair Gray
- Language: English
- Publisher: Bloomsbury Press
- Publication date: 1992
- Publication place: United Kingdom
- Media type: Print (hardback and paperback)
- Preceded by: McGrotty and Ludmilla

Poor Things: Episodes from the Early Life of Archibald McCandless M.D., Scottish Public Health Officer is a novel by Scottish writer Alasdair Gray, published in 1992. It won the Whitbread Award and the Guardian Fiction Prize the same year.

A postmodern retelling of the 1818 gothic horror novel Frankenstein; or, The Modern Prometheus by Mary Shelley, the narrative follows the life of Bella Baxter, a surgically fabricated woman created in late Victorian Glasgow. Bella’s navigation of late 19th century society is the lens through which Gray delivers social commentary on patriarchal institutions, social equality, socioeconomic matters and sexual politics.

The novel itself is epistolary, being composed of a fictional novella entitled Episodes from the Early Life of Archibald McCandless M.D., Scottish Public Health Officer, several extended letters, a spread of original illustrations, as well as an Introduction and Critical Notes. The bracketing Introduction and Critical Notes feature a meta-textual component, in that they simultaneously exist in the novel’s fictional canon, but are also credited to real-life author Alasdair Gray.

The novel is illustrated by Alasdair Gray, despite the text claiming the illustration were created by Scottish painter and printmaker William Strang.

== Plot ==
The story begins in 19th-century Glasgow with Archibald McCandless, a young medical student who becomes involved with the eccentric and brilliant surgeon Godwin Baxter. McCandless meets Bella Baxter, a beautiful, childlike woman who lives under Godwin’s care. According to McCandless’s account, Bella is the result of a radical experiment: Godwin discovered the body of a pregnant woman who had drowned and, in a grotesque act of science, revived her by implanting the brain of her unborn fœtus into her adult body. This experiment supposedly created a new life—Bella—with the physical form of a grown woman and the mind of a newborn.

Under the guidance of Godwin and Archibald, Bella quickly matures intellectually and emotionally, developing into a curious, assertive, and sexually liberated woman. Though McCandless falls in love with her, Bella resists his romantic idealisation and seeks her own experiences. She leaves with the decadent lawyer Duncan Wedderburn on a whirlwind trip across Europe and the Middle East. During their travels, Bella confronts the inequalities and absurdities of the Victorian world, eventually realising that Wedderburn sees her more as a possession than a partner. Disillusioned, she escapes him and returns to Glasgow.

Back home, Bella becomes a champion of women's rights, social reform, and public health. She and Archibald eventually marry—not as a result of submission, but as a conscious, equal partnership built on mutual respect and shared political ideals. Together, they work to improve the lives of the poor, challenge the hypocrisy of the upper class, and confront the outdated moral structures of their time.

However, a letter from Bella herself—now known as Victoria McCandless—completely contradicts McCandless's memoir. She reveals that the resurrection story was a fabrication, a romantic fantasy created by Archibald to mythologise their relationship and his own sense of loss and failure. Bella insists that she was always a fully formed, intelligent woman, and that her life with Godwin and later Archibald was nothing like the fairy tale described in the memoir. This revelation casts doubt on everything the reader has just read, turning the novel into a postmodern puzzle about truth, memory, and the way stories are shaped by those who tell them.

== Notes ==
Poor Things contains illustrations by Alasdair Gray, which the text claims are by the Scottish etcher and illustrator William Strang. There are also punning additions of fragments of images from Gray's Anatomy. One feature of the novel that has attracted comment is the page of review quotes, featuring a printed erratum strip. Some of these reviews are patently fictitious (such as that from the Private Nose) and others are attributed to real publications, but seem so harsh that their authenticity is called into question.

== Film adaptation ==
A film adaptation of the book was produced with Yorgos Lanthimos directing and Tony McNamara writing the script after the presentation of Denisse Nichols. The cast includes Emma Stone, Mark Ruffalo, Willem Dafoe, Ramy Youssef, Christopher Abbott, Kathryn Hunter, and Jerrod Carmichael. The adaptation was released in theatres on December 8, 2023. The film enjoyed rapturous acclaim, winning several prizes including the Golden Lion at the 80th Venice Film Festival as well as four Academy Awards later that year.

== Sources ==
- Gray, Alasdair (1992). Poor Things: Episodes from the Early Life of Archibald McCandless M.D., Scottish Public Health Officer. London: Bloomsbury Publishing. ISBN 0-7475-12469.
