= Lanark: A Life in Four Books =

Book by Alasdair Gray

Lanark
- First edition
- Author: Alasdair Gray
- Language: English
- Publisher: Canongate Press
- Publication date: 25 February 1981
- Publication place: Scotland
- Media type: Print (hardcover)
- Pages: 560 pp
- ISBN: 0-903937-74-3
- OCLC: 12635568

Lanark, subtitled A Life in Four Books, is the first novel of Scottish writer Alasdair Gray. Written over a period of almost thirty years, it combines realist and dystopian surrealist depictions of his home city of Glasgow.

Its publication in 1981 prompted Anthony Burgess to call Gray "the best Scottish novelist since Walter Scott". Lanark won the inaugural Saltire Society Book of the Year award in 1982, and was also named Scottish Arts Council Book of the Year. The book, still his best known, has since become a cult classic. In 2008, The Guardian heralded Lanark as "one of the landmarks of 20th-century fiction."

== Plot summary ==
Lanark comprises four books, arranged in the order Three, One, Two, Four (there is also a Prologue before Book One, and an Epilogue four chapters before the end of the book). In the Epilogue, the author explains this by saying that "I want Lanark to be read in one order but eventually thought of in another", and that the epilogue itself is "too important" to go at the end.

In Book Three, a young man awakes alone in a train carriage. He has no memory of his past and picks his name from a strangely familiar photograph on the wall. He soon arrives in Unthank, a strange Glasgow-like city in which there is no daylight and whose disappearing residents suffer from strange diseases, orifices growing on their limbs and body heat fading away. Lanark begins to associate with a group of twenty-somethings to whom he cannot fully relate and whose mores he cannot understand, and soon begins to suffer from dragonhide, a disease which turns his skin into scales as an external manifestation of his emotional repression. Lanark is eventually swallowed by a mouth in the earth, and awakes in the Institute, a sort of hospital which cures patients of their diseases but uses the hopeless cases for power and food. Upon learning this, Lanark is horrified and determines to leave.

Books One and Two constitute a realist Bildungsroman beginning in pre-war Glasgow, and tell the story of Duncan Thaw ("based on myself, he was tougher and more honest"), a difficult and precocious child born to impecunious and frustrated parents in the East End of Glasgow. The book follows Thaw's wartime evacuation, secondary education and his scholarship to the Glasgow School of Art, where his inability to form relationships with women and his obsessive artistic vision lead to his descent into madness and eventual suicide by drowning.

Book Four sees Lanark begin a bizarre, dreamlike journey back to Unthank, which he finds on the point of total disintegration, wracked by political strife, avarice, paranoia and economic meltdown, all of which he is unable to prevent. In the course of the journey, during which he meets his author, he rapidly ages. He finally finds himself old, sitting in a hilltop cemetery as Unthank breaks down in an apocalypse of fire and flood, and, his time of death having been revealed to him, he ends the book calmly awaiting it.

== Interpretation ==
Lanark could be viewed as Thaw in a personal Hell. (Thaw drowns in the sea; Lanark arrives in Unthank with the same belongings, and seashells and sand in his pockets.) The connection between the two narratives is ambiguous; Gray said that "One is a highly exaggerated form of just about the everyday reality of the other" (for example, Thaw's eczema is mirrored by Lanark's skin disease 'dragonhide'). He also writes in the novel itself: "The Thaw narrative shows a man dying because he is bad at loving. It is enclosed by [Lanark's] narrative which shows civilization collapsing for the same reason" and (spoken to Lanark) "You are Thaw with the neurotic imagination trimmed off and built into the furniture of the world you occupy". He also writes: "The plots of the Thaw and Lanark sections are independent of each other and cemented by typographical contrivances rather than formal necessity. A possible explanation is that the author thinks a heavy book will make a bigger splash than two light ones".

One of the most characteristically postmodern parts of the book is the Epilogue, in which Lanark meets the author in the guise of the character "Nastler". He makes the first two remarks about the book quoted above, and anticipates criticism of the work and of the Epilogue in particular, saying "The critics will accuse me of self-indulgence, but I don't care". An Index of Plagiarisms is printed in the margins of the discussion. For instance, Gray describes much of Lanark as an extended 'Difplag' (diffuse plagiarism) of Charles Kingsley's The Water Babies. Some of the supposed plagiarisms refer to non-existent chapters of the book.

The Unthank parts of the book may be considered as part of the "social-commentary" tradition of science fiction, and Lanark has often been compared with Nineteen Eighty-Four by George Orwell.

Gray added an appendix to the 2001 edition of the novel, in which he included a brief biography and elaborated on some of the influences on and inspirations for the novel. He cited Kafka as a major influence on the atmosphere of the novel. He also referred to his own experiences in the media industry which he states is reflected in Lanark's numerous encounters in labyrinthine buildings with individuals talking in jargon. The Institute he describes as a combination of Wyndham Lewis's conception of Hell in Malign Fiesta along with three real-life structures: the London Underground, Stobhill Hospital in Glasgow and BBC Television Centre in London. More immediately evident inspiration can be seen in the cathedral and necropolis episodes in Unthank, whose proximity to an urban tangle of roads is mirrored in Glasgow's real-life Townhead area. Glasgow Cathedral is yards away from the Necropolis to the east and the M8 motorway (and unfinished Inner Ring Road) to the north and west. Gray said Glasgow Cathedral was the only location he purposefully visited to make notes about during the writing of the novel; all other locations he wrote about from memory.

== Genesis ==
Gray began writing the novel as a student in 1954. Book One was written by 1963, but he was unsuccessful in getting it published. The whole work was finished in 1976, typeset by the Kingsport Press in Kingsport, Tennessee, and published in 1981 by the Scottish publisher Canongate Press. The novel was an immediate critical success.

== Adaptations ==
An adaptation of Lanark by Alastair Cording was staged by Glasgow's Tag Theatre Company at the Assembly Hall, Edinburgh, during the Edinburgh International Festival in August 1995. An adaptation entitled Lanark: A Life in Three Acts, written by David Greig and directed by Graham Eatough, was produced and performed at the Edinburgh International Festival in 2015.

== Reviews ==
Craig, Cairns (1981), Going Down to Hell is Easy, review of Alasdair Gray's Lanark, in Murray, Glen (ed.), Cencrastus No. 6, Autumn 1981, pp. 19 - 21
