= Alasdair Gray =

Scottish writer and artist (1934–2019)

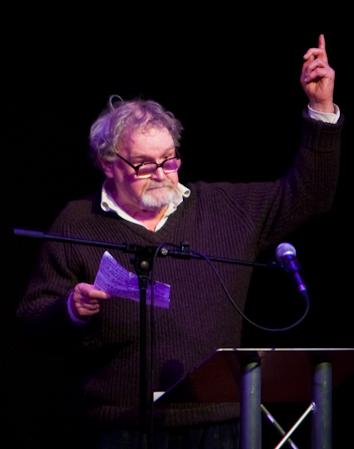
- Gray in 2010
- Born: 28 December 1934; Riddrie, Glasgow, Scotland
- Died: 29 December 2019 (aged 85); Govan, Glasgow, Scotland
- Education: Glasgow School of Art
- Occupations: Novelist; artist; playwright; academic; teacher; poet; muralist; illustrator
- Spouses: Inge Sørensen (m. 1961; sep. 1969) Morag McAlpine (m. 1991; died 2014)
- Children: 1
- Writing career
- Years active: 1951–2019
- Genres: Science fiction; dystopianism; surrealism; realism
- Notable works: Lanark; 1982, Janine; Poor Things; The Book of Prefaces
- Movement: Postmodern literature
- Website: Official website Alasdair Gray Archive

Alasdair James Gray (28 December 1934 – 29 December 2019) was a Scottish writer and artist. He published novels, short stories, plays, poetry and translations, and wrote on politics and the history of English and Scots literature. His works of fiction combine realism, fantasy, and science fiction with the use of his own typography and illustrations, and won several awards.

Utilising a postmodern writing style, Gray's works have been compared with those of Franz Kafka, George Orwell, Jorge Luis Borges and Italo Calvino; and often contain extensive footnotes explaining the works that influenced them. His books inspired many younger Scottish writers, including Irvine Welsh, Alan Warner, A. L. Kennedy, Janice Galloway, Chris Kelso and Iain Banks. His first novel, Lanark (1981), is considered a landmark of Scottish fiction; in a 2016 public poll by the BBC, it was named the third-best Scottish novel of all time. He was writer-in-residence at the University of Glasgow from 1977 to 1979 and a professor of Creative Writing from 2001 to 2003; simultaneously holding the latter position at the University of Strathclyde.

Gray studied at the Glasgow School of Art from 1952 to 1957. As well as his book illustrations, he painted portraits and murals, including at the Òran Mór venue and one at Hillhead subway station. His artwork has been widely exhibited and is held in several important collections. Before Lanark, he had written plays for radio and television.

Gray was a Scottish nationalist and a republican, and wrote in support of socialism and Scottish independence. He popularised the epigram "Work as if you live in the early days of a better nation" (Note: Paraphrased from Canadian poet Dennis Lee's poem "Civil Elegies") which was engraved in the Canongate Wall of the Scottish Parliament Building in Edinburgh when it opened in 2004. He lived almost all his life in Glasgow, married twice, and had one son. After his death in 2019, The Guardian referred to him as "the father figure of the renaissance in Scottish literature and art".

== Early life ==
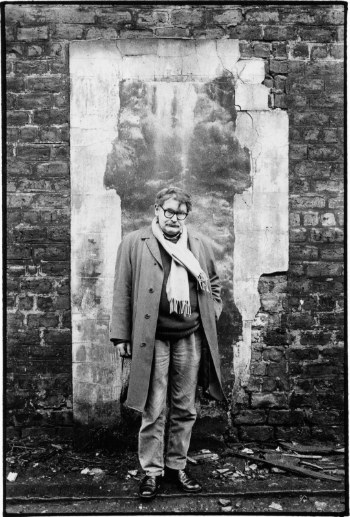
Gray in Glasgow, 1985

Gray's father, Alexander, had been wounded in the First World War. He worked for many years in a factory making boxes, often went hillwalking, and helped found the Scottish Youth Hostels Association. Gray's mother was Amy (née Fleming), whose parents had moved to Scotland from Lincolnshire because her father had been blacklisted in England for trade union membership. She worked in a clothing warehouse. Alasdair Gray was born in Riddrie in north-east Glasgow on 28 December 1934; his sister Mora was born two years later. During the Second World War, Gray was evacuated to Auchterarder in Perthshire, and Stonehouse in Lanarkshire. From 1942 until 1945 the family lived in Wetherby in Yorkshire, where his father was running a hostel for workers in ROF Thorp Arch, a munitions factory.

Gray frequently visited the public library; he enjoyed the Winnie-the-Pooh stories, and comics such as The Beano and The Dandy. Later, Edgar Allan Poe became a powerful influence on the young Gray. His family lived on a council estate in Riddrie, and he attended Whitehill Secondary School, where he was made editor of the school magazine and won prizes for Art and English. When he was eleven Gray appeared on BBC children's radio reading from an adaptation of one of Aesop's Fables, and he started writing short stories as a teenager. His mother died of cancer when he was eighteen; in the same year he enrolled at Glasgow School of Art. As an art student he began what later became his first novel, Lanark, which originally carried the name Portrait of the Artist as a Young Scot. He completed the first book in 1963; it was rejected by the Curtis Brown literary agency. It was originally intended to be Gray's version of A Portrait of the Artist as a Young Man.

In 1957 Gray graduated from art school with a degree in Design and Mural Painting. That year he won a Bellahouston Travelling scholarship, and intended to use it to paint and see galleries in Spain. A severe asthma attack left him hospitalised in Gibraltar, and he had his money stolen. (Note: He later used the story in Lean Tales.) From 1958–1962 Gray worked part-time as an art teacher in Lanarkshire and Glasgow, and in 1959–1960 he studied teaching at Jordanhill College.

Gray married Inge Sørensen, a teen-aged nurse from Denmark, in 1961. They had a son, Andrew, in 1963, and separated in 1969. He had an eight-year relationship with Danish jeweller Bethsy Gray. He was married to Morag Nimmo McAlpine Gray from 1991 until her death in 2014. He lived in Glasgow his entire adult life.

== Visual art ==
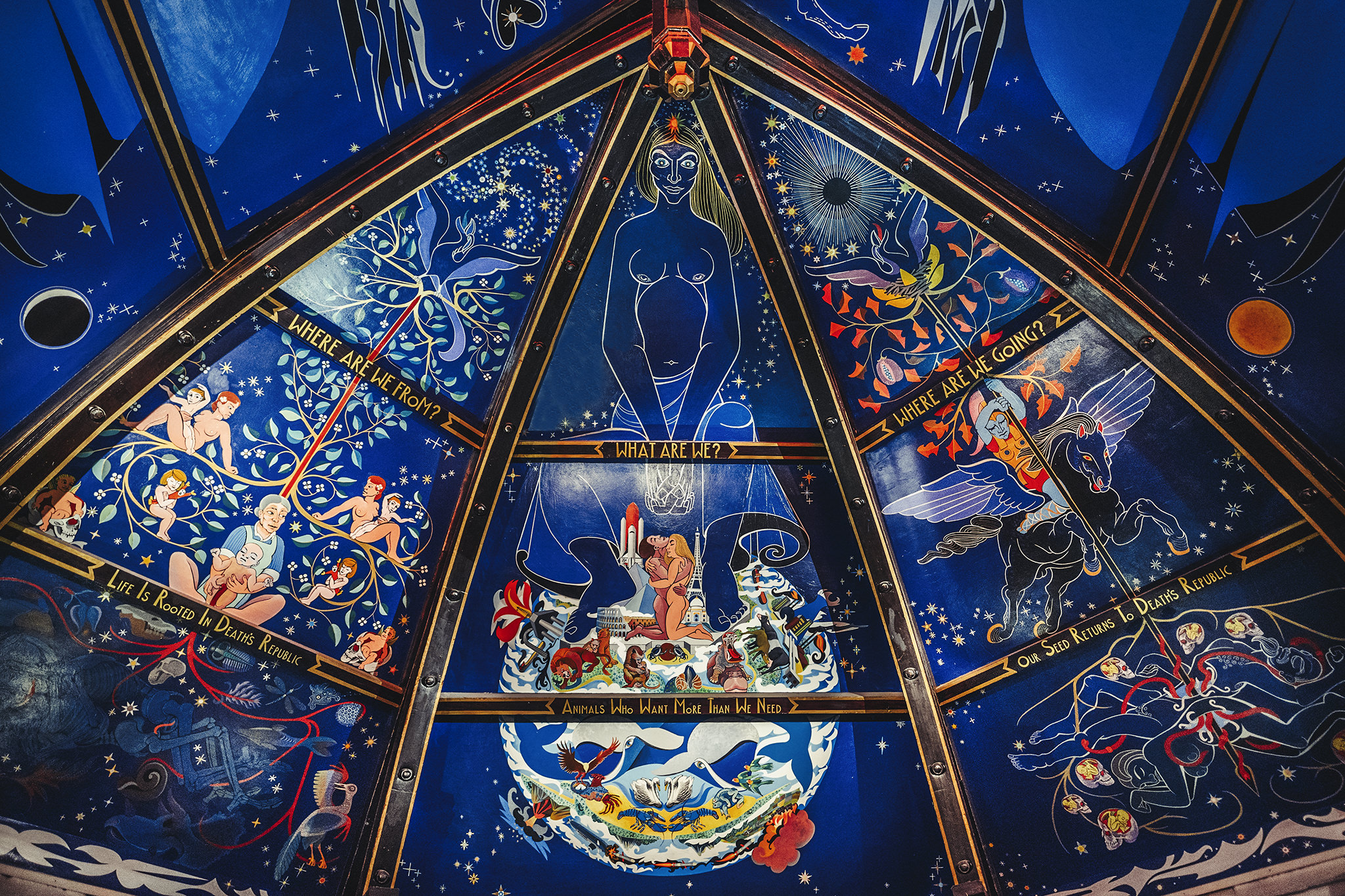
Mural by Alasdair Gray in the Òran Mór arts venue in Glasgow

After finishing art school, Gray painted theatrical scenery for the Glasgow Pavilion and Citizens Theatre, and worked as a freelance artist. His first mural was "Horrors of War" for the Scottish-USSR Friendship Society in Glasgow. In 1964 the BBC made a documentary film, Under the Helmet, about his career to date. Many of his murals have been lost; surviving examples include one in the Ubiquitous Chip restaurant in the West End of Glasgow, and another at Hillhead subway station. His ceiling mural (in collaboration with Robert Salmon, Nichol Wheatley and others for the auditorium of the Òran Mór theatre and music venue on Byres Road is one of the largest works of art in Scotland and was painted over several years. It shows Adam and Eve embracing against a night sky, with modern people from Glasgow in the foreground.

In 1977–1978, Gray worked for the People's Palace museum, as Glasgow's "artist recorder", funded by a scheme set up by the Labour government. He produced hundreds of drawings of the city, including portraits of politicians, people in the arts, members of the general public and workplaces with workers. These are now in the collection at Kelvingrove Art Gallery and Museum.

In 2003, Gray began working with gallerist Sorcha Dallas who, over the next 14 years, helped to develop interest in his visual practice, brokering sales to major collections including the Arts Council of England, the Scottish National Galleries and the Tate. His paintings and prints are also held in Glasgow Museums, the Victoria and Albert Museum, the National Library of Scotland and the Hunterian Museum.

In 2014–2015, Dallas devised the Alasdair Gray Season, a citywide celebration of Gray's visual work to coincide with his 80th birthday. The main exhibition, Alasdair Gray: From the Personal to the Universal, was held at the Kelvingrove Art Gallery and Museum with more than 15,000 attending.

His first solo London exhibition took place in late 2017 at the Coningsby Gallery in Fitzrovia and the Leyden Gallery in Spitalfields.

In 2023, Glasgow Museums acquired Gray's 1964 mural Cowcaddens Streetscape in the Fifties, which the artist described as "my best big oil painting", for display at the Kelvingrove Gallery.

Gray said that he found writing tiring, but that painting gave him energy. His visual art often used local or personal details to encompass international or universal truths and themes.

== Writing ==
The title page for Book Four of Lanark

Gray's first plays were broadcast on radio (Quiet People) and television (The Fall of Kelvin Walker) in 1968. Between 1972 and 1974 he took part in a writing group organised by Philip Hobsbaum, which included James Kelman, Tom Leonard, Liz Lochhead, Aonghas MacNeacail and Jeff Torrington. In 1973, with the support of Edwin Morgan, he received a grant from the Scottish Arts Council to allow him to continue with Lanark. From 1977 to 1979 he was writer-in-residence at the University of Glasgow.

Lanark, his first novel, was published in 1981 to great acclaim, and became his best-known work. (Note: He had written it between 1953 and 1977.) The book tells two parallel stories. One, the first written, is a Bildungsroman, a realist depiction of Duncan Thaw, a young artist growing up in Glasgow in the 1950s. The other is a dystopia, where the character Lanark visits Unthank, which is ruled by the Institute and the Council, opaque bodies which exercise absolute power. Lanark enters politics believing he can change Unthank for the better, but gets drunk and disgraces himself. Later, when he is dying, his son Sandy tells him "The world is only improved by people who do ordinary jobs and refuse to be bullied." There is an epilogue four chapters before the end, with a list of the work's alleged plagiarisms, some from non-existent works. The title page of Book Four, which was used as the cover art on the paperback, was a reference to Leviathan by Thomas Hobbes.

Lanark has been compared with Franz Kafka and Nineteen Eighty-Four by George Orwell for its atmosphere of bureaucratic threat, and with Jorge Luis Borges and Italo Calvino for its fabulism. It revivified Scottish literature, inspired a new generation of Scottish writers, including Irvine Welsh, Alan Warner, A. L. Kennedy, Janice Galloway and Iain Banks, and has been called "one of the landmarks of 20th-century fiction", but it did not make Gray wealthy. His 2010 illustrated autobiography A Life in Pictures outlined the parts of Lanark he based on his own experiences: his mother died when he was young, he went to art school, suffered from chronic eczema and shyness, and found difficulty in relationships with women. (Note: Lanark and A Life in Pictures won Scottish Book of the Year in the Saltire Society Literary Awards, in 1981 and 2011 respectively.) His first short-story collection, Unlikely Stories, Mostly, won the Cheltenham Prize for Literature in 1983. It is a selection of Gray's short fiction from 1951–1983.

Gray regarded 1982, Janine, published in 1984, as his best work. Partly inspired by Hugh MacDiarmid's A Drunk Man Looks at the Thistle, the stream-of-consciousness narrative depicts Jock McLeish, a middle-aged Conservative security supervisor who is dependent on alcohol, and describes how people and sectors of society are controlled against their best interests, over a background of the sadomasochistic sex fantasies that McLeish concocts to distract himself from his misery. Anthony Burgess, who had called Gray "the most important Scottish writer since Sir Walter Scott" on the strength of Lanark, found 1982, Janine "juvenile".

The Fall of Kelvin Walker (1985) and McGrotty and Ludmilla (1990) were based on television scripts Gray had written in the 1960s and 1970s, and describe the adventures of Scottish protagonists in London. Something Leather (1990) explores female sexuality; Gray regretted giving it its provocative title. He called it his weakest book, and he excised the sexual fantasy material and retitled it Glaswegians when he included it in his compendium Every Short Story 1951-2012.

Poor Things (1992) discusses Scottish colonial history via a Frankenstein-like drama set in 19th-century Glasgow. Godwin 'God' Baxter is a scientist who implants a suicide victim with the brain of her own unborn child. It was Gray's most commercially successful work and he enjoyed writing it. The London Review of Books considered it his funniest novel, and a welcome return to form. It won a Whitbread Novel Award and a Guardian Fiction Prize. It was later adapted into a film starring Emma Stone, directed by Yorgos Lanthimos; the novel was adapted for the screen by Tony McNamara.

A History Maker (1994) is set in a 23rd-century matriarchal society in the area around St Mary's Loch, and shows a utopia going wrong. The Book of Prefaces (2000) tells the story of the development of the English language and of humanism, using a selection of prefaces from books ranging from Cædmon to Wilfred Owen. Gray selected the works, wrote extensive marginal notes, and translated some earlier pieces into modern English.

Around 2000, Gray had to apply to the Scottish Artists' Benevolent Association for financial support, as he was struggling to survive on the income from his book sales. In 2001, Gray, Kelman and Leonard became joint professors of the Creative Writing programme at Glasgow and Strathclyde Universities. Gray stood down from the post in 2003, having disagreed with other staff about the direction the programme should take.

"Glasgow is a magnificent city," said McAlpin. "Why do we hardly ever notice that?" "Because nobody imagines living here… think of Florence, Paris, London, New York. Nobody visiting them for the first time is a stranger because he's already visited them in paintings, novels, history books and films. But if a city hasn't been used by an artist not even the inhabitants live there imaginatively."

— Lanark (1981)

Gray's books are mainly set in Glasgow and other parts of Scotland. His work helped strengthen and deepen the development of the Glasgow literary scene away from gang fiction, while also resisting neoliberal gentrification. Gray's work, particularly Lanark, "put Scotland back on the literary map", and strongly influenced Scottish fiction for decades. The frequent political themes in his writing argue the importance of promoting ordinary human decency, protecting the weak from the strong, and remembering the complexity of social issues. They are treated in a playfully humorous and postmodern manner, and some stories, especially Lanark, 1982, Janine, and Something Leather, depict sexual frustration.

My stories try to seduce the reader by disguising themselves as sensational entertainment, but are propaganda for democratic welfare-state Socialism and an independent Scottish parliament. My jacket designs and illustrations—especially the erotic ones—are designed with the same high purpose.

— Contemporary Novelists (1996)

Will Self has called him "a creative polymath with an integrated politico-philosophic vision" and "perhaps the greatest living [writer] in this archipelago today". Gray described himself as "a fat, spectacled, balding, increasingly old Glasgow pedestrian". In 2019, he won the inaugural Saltire Society Lifetime Achievement Award for his contribution to Scottish literature.

His books are often self-illustrated using bold lines and graphic images, a style influenced by his early exposure to comics by William Blake and Aubrey Beardsley, Ladybird Books, and Harmsworth's Universal Encyclopaedia, and which has been compared to that of Diego Rivera.

He published three collections of poetry; (Note: Old Negatives (1989) ISBN 978-0-224-02656-7, Sixteen Occasional Poems (2000) ISBN 978-0-9538359-0-4, and Collected Verse (2010) ISBN 978-1-906120-53-5) like his fiction, his poems are sometimes-humorous depictions of "big themes" such as love, God and language. Stuart Kelly described them as having "a dispassionate, confessional voice; technical accomplishment utilised to convey meaning rather than for its own sake and a hard-won sense of the complexity of the universe…. His poetic work, especially when dealing with the relationship, or lack thereof, between the sexes, is memorable and disconcerting in the way only good poetry is."

== Political views ==
Gray's characteristic typography and illustrative design, exemplified in the front cover for the Sunday Herald, 4 May 2014, supporting a "Yes" vote in that year's independence referendum

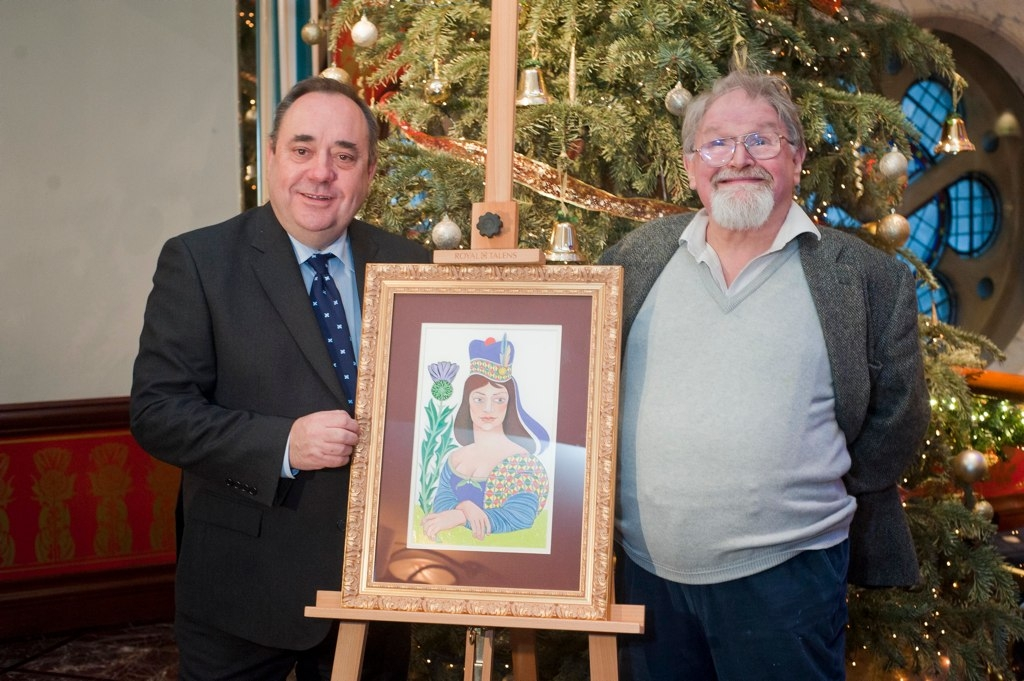
Gray with Alex Salmond in 2011

Gray was a Scottish nationalist. He started voting for the Scottish National Party (SNP) in the 1970s, despairing about the erosion of the welfare state which had provided his education. Gray believed that North Sea oil should be nationalised, and wrote three pamphlets advocating Scottish independence from the United Kingdom, (Note: Why Scots Should Rule Scotland (1992; revised 1997), ISBN 978-0-86241-671-3, How We Should Rule Ourselves (2005, with Adam Tomkins), ISBN 978-1-84195-722-7 and Independence: An Argument for Home Rule (2014) ISBN 978-1-78211-169-6.) noting at the beginning of Why Scots Should Rule Scotland (1992) that "by Scots I mean everyone in Scotland who is eligible to vote." In 2014, he wrote that "the UK electorate has no chance of voting for a party which will do anything to seriously tax our enlarged millionaire class that controls Westminster." In a 2012 essay, Gray expressed his disapproval of English immigrants to Scotland who in his view only came to Scotland to advance their careers in the arts.

He frequently used the epigram "Work as if you live in the early days of a better nation" in his books; by 1991, the phrase had become a slogan for Scottish opposition to Thatcherism. (Note: He paraphrased it from a poem by the Canadian author Dennis Lee. The original lines were: "And best of all is finding a place to be/in the early days of a better civilization".) The text was engraved in the Canongate Wall of the Scottish Parliament Building in Edinburgh when it opened in 2004. It was referred to by SNP politicians during the 2007 Scottish Parliament election campaign, when they became a minority government for the first time.

In 2001, Gray was narrowly defeated by Greg Hemphill when he stood as the candidate of the Glasgow University Scottish Nationalist Association for the post of Rector of the University of Glasgow. A longstanding supporter of the SNP and the Scottish Socialist Party, Gray voted Liberal Democrat at the 2010 general election in an effort to unseat Labour, who he regarded as "corrupted"; by the 2019 election he was voting Labour as a protest against the SNP for not being radical enough.

Gray designed a special front page for the Sunday Herald in May 2014 when it came out in favour of a "Yes" vote in that year's independence referendum, the first and only newspaper to do so. The newspaper described independence as "the chance to alter course, to travel roads less taken, to define a destiny", and the editor, Richard Walker, criticised the scare tactics of the "No" side and stressed that independence was normal. Gray's design, and his and the paper's support for independence, attracted widespread coverage at the time and later. The cover consists of a large thistle surrounded by Scottish saltires. Iain Macwhirter of the Herald wrote that it was "striking", and The National said Gray's image had "galvanised the 'Yes' movement". The Sunday Herald's website doubled its traffic, and the newspaper's sales rose by 31% after it supported "Yes". (Note: The "Yes" campaign was unsuccessful and lost the referendum, 55% to 45%.) Despite Scotland narrowly voting against independence, Gray felt the result was more favourable than a narrow Yes win.

== Later life ==
In 1990, he co-founded the publishing company Dog and Bone Press with Chris Boyce and Chris's wife, Angela.

In 2008, Gray's former student and secretary Rodge Glass published a biography of him, called Alasdair Gray: A Secretary's Biography. Gray was broadly approving of the work. Glass sums up critics' main problems with Gray's writing as their discomfort with his politics, and with his frequent tendency to pre-empt criticism in his work. Glass's book won the Somerset Maugham Award in 2009.

In 2014, Gray's autobiography Of Me & Others was released, and Kevin Cameron made a feature-length film Alasdair Gray: A Life in Progress, including interviews with Liz Lochhead and Gray's sister, Mora Rolley.

In August 2015, a dramatisation of Lanark was performed at the Edinburgh International Festival. was adapted by David Greig and directed by Graham Eatough. It had previously been dramatised at the festival by the TAG Theatre Company in 1995.

In June 2015, Gray was seriously injured in a fall, after which he used a wheelchair. He continued to write; the first two parts of his translation of Dante Alighieri's Divine Comedy trilogy were published in 2018 and 2019. (Note: Hell: Dante's Divine Trilogy Part One Decorated and Englished in Prosaic Verse (2018), ISBN 978-1-78689-253-9 and Purgatory: Dante's Divine Trilogy Part Two Englished in Prosaic Verse (2019), ISBN 978-1-78689-473-1)

== Death and legacy ==
Alasdair Gray died at Queen Elizabeth University Hospital in Glasgow on 29 December 2019, the day after his 85th birthday, following a short illness. He left his body to science and there was no funeral.

Nicola Sturgeon, first minister of Scotland, remembered him as "one of the brightest intellectual and creative lights Scotland has known in modern times." Tributes were also paid by Jonathan Coe, Val McDermid, Ian Rankin, Ali Smith and Irvine Welsh. The Guardian referred to him as "the father figure of the renaissance in Scottish literature and art".

His personal and literary archive, including manuscripts, typescripts, diaries and correspondence, is held at the National Library of Scotland.

Sorcha Dallas was responsible for packing and organising his items posthumously and establishing the Alasdair Gray Archive in March 2020. The Archive is a free community resource caring for Gray's studio and visual and literary materials. It commissions new works, offers access and education opportunities as well as partnering on projects and events. One such event is Gray Day, held annually on 25 February in celebration of Gray's life and works.

== Selected writing ==
=== Novels ===
- Lanark (1981), ISBN 978-1-84767-374-9
- 1982, Janine (1984), ISBN 978-1-84767-444-9
- The Fall of Kelvin Walker (1985), ISBN 978-0-8076-1144-9
- Something Leather (1990), ISBN 978-0-330-31944-7
- McGrotty and Ludmilla (1990), ISBN 978-1-872536-00-2
- Poor Things (1992), ISBN 978-1-56478-307-3
- A History Maker (1994), ISBN 978-1-84195-576-6
- Mavis Belfrage (1996), ISBN 978-0-7475-3089-3
- Old Men in Love (2007), ISBN 978-0-7475-9353-9

=== Short stories ===
- Unlikely Stories, Mostly (1983), ISBN 978-1-84767-502-6
- Lean Tales (1985) (with James Kelman and Agnes Owens) (1995), ISBN 978-0-09-958541-1
- Ten Tales Tall & True (1993), ISBN 978-0-15-100090-6
- The Ends of Our Tethers: 13 Sorry Stories (2003), ISBN 978-1-84195-626-8
- Every Short Story by Alasdair Gray 1951-2012 (2012), ISBN 978-0-85786-562-5

=== Theatre ===
- A Gray Play Book (2009), ISBN 978-1-906307-91-2
- Fleck (2011), ISBN 978-1-906120-37-5
