= Scotland in the early modern period =

Scotland in the early modern period refers, for the purposes of this article, to Scotland between the death of James IV in 1513 and the end of the Jacobite risings in the mid-eighteenth century. It roughly corresponds to the early modern period in Europe, beginning with the Renaissance and Reformation and ending with the start of the Enlightenment and Industrial Revolution.

After a long minority, the personal reign of James V saw the court become a centre of Renaissance patronage, but it ended in military defeat and another long minority for the infant Mary Queen of Scots. Scotland hovered between dominance by the English and French, which ended in the Treaty of Edinburgh 1560, by which both withdrew their troops, but leaving the way open for religious reform. The Scottish Reformation was strongly influenced by Calvinism leading to widespread iconoclasm and the introduction of a Presbyterian system of organisation and discipline that would have a major impact on Scottish life. In 1561 Mary returned from France, but her personal reign deteriorated into murder, scandal and civil war, forcing her to escape to England where she was later executed. Her escape left her Protestant opponents in power in the name of the infant James VI. In 1603 he inherited the thrones of England and Ireland, creating a dynastic union and moving the centre of royal patronage and power to London.

His son Charles I attempted to impose elements of the English religious settlement on his other kingdoms. Relations gradually deteriorated resulting in the Bishops' Wars (1637–40), ending in defeat for Charles and helping to bring about the War of Three Kingdoms involving England and Ireland. In 1643 Scotland entered into another period of civil war with the Royalist armies supporting the king and the Scottish Covenanters entering the war entered the war in support on the English Parliamentary side. Ultimately the parliamentary forces emerged victorious. Later, they allied with Charles who was defeated and executed. Scotland ultimately accepted his son, Charles II, as their king precipitating the Anglo-Scottish War of 1650-1652 which Scotland lost to a parliamentary army under Oliver Cromwell, and was occupied and incorporated into the Commonwealth. The Restoration of the Monarchy in 1660 saw the return of episcopacy and an increasingly absolutist regime, resulting in religious and political upheaval and rebellions. With the accession of the openly Catholic James VII, there was increasing disquiet among Protestants. After the Glorious Revolution of 1688–89, William of Orange and Mary, the daughter of James, were accepted as monarchs. Presbyterianism was reintroduced and limitations placed on monarchy. After severe economic dislocation in the 1690s there were moves that led to political union with England as the Kingdom of Great Britain in 1707. The deposed main hereditary line of the Stuarts became a focus for political discontent, known as Jacobitism, leading to a series of invasions and rebellions, but with the defeat of the last in 1745, Scotland entered a period of great political stability, economic and intellectual expansion.

Although there was an improving system of roads in early modern Scotland, it remained a country divided by topography, particularly between the Highlands and Islands and the Lowlands. Most of the economic development was in the Lowlands, which saw the beginnings of industrialisation, agricultural improvement and the expansion of eastern burghs, particularly Glasgow, as trade routes to the Americas opened up. The local laird emerged as a key figure and the heads of names and clans in the Borders and Highlands declined in importance. There was a population expanding towards the end of the period and increasing urbanisation. Social tensions were evident in witch trials and the creation of a system of poor laws. Despite the aggrandisement of the crown and the increase in forms of taxation, revenues remained inadequate. The Privy Council and Parliament remained central to government, with changing compositions and importance before the Act of Union in 1707 saw their abolition. The growth of local government saw introduction of Justices of the Peace and Commissioners of Supply, while the law saw the increasing importance of royal authority and professionalisation. The expansion of parish schools and reform of universities heralded the beginnings of an intellectual flowering in the Enlightenment. There was also a flowering of Scottish literature before the loss of the court as a centre of patronage at the beginning of the seventeenth century. The tradition of church music was fundamentally changed by the Reformation, with the loss of complex polyphonic music for a new tradition of metrical psalms singing. In architecture, royal building was strongly influenced by Renaissance styles, while the houses of the great lairds adopted a hybrid form known as Scots baronial and after the Restoration was influenced by Palladian and Baroque styles. In church architecture a distinctive plain style based on a T-plan emerged. The Reformation also had a major impact on art, with a loss of church patronage leading to a tradition of painted ceilings and walls and the beginnings of a tradition of portraiture and landscape painting.

== Political history ==
=== Sixteenth century ===
==== James V ====
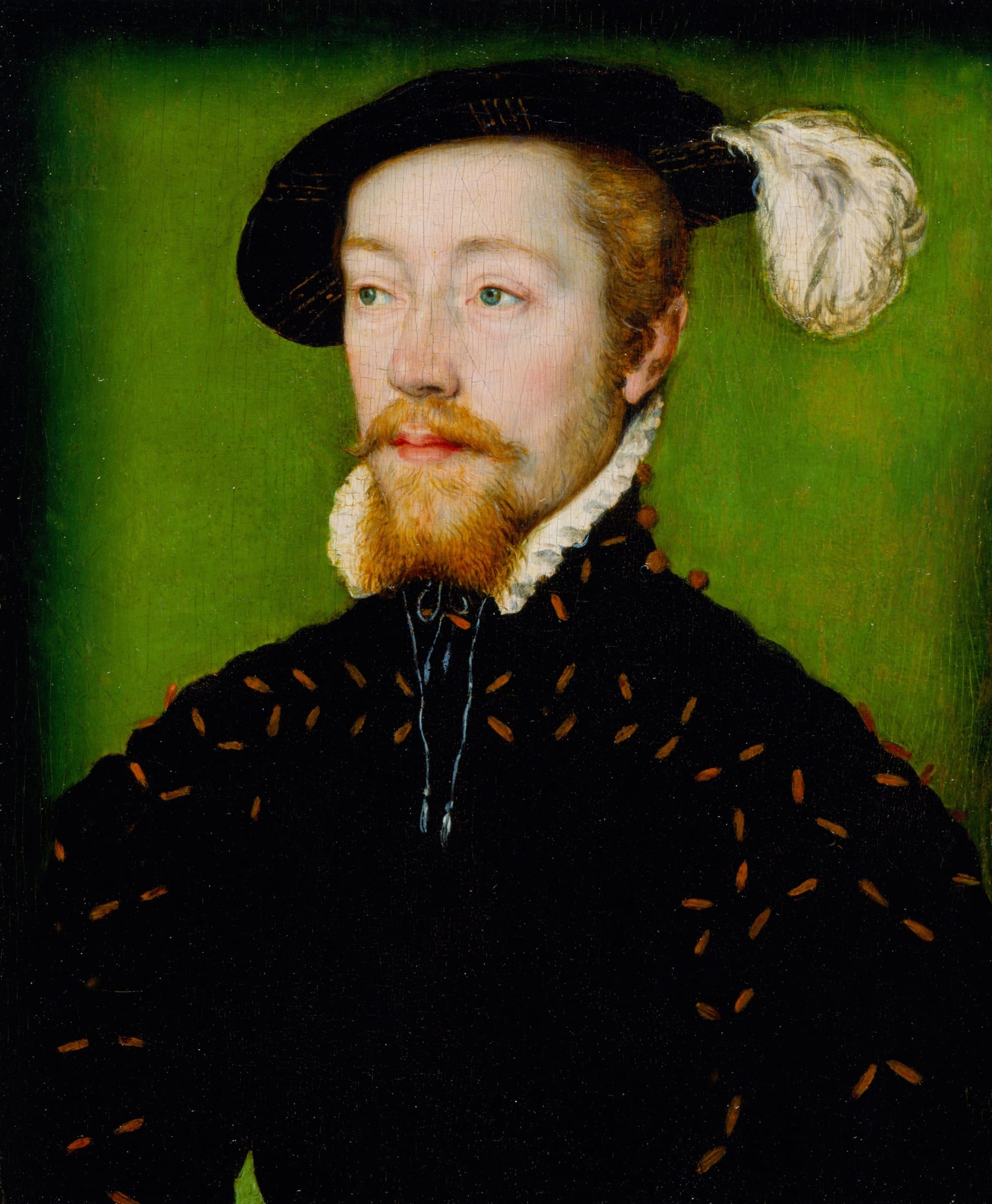
Portrait of James V, c. 1536, by Corneille de Lyon.

The death of James IV at the Battle of Flodden in 1513 meant a long period of regency in the name of his infant son James V. He was declared an adult in 1524, but the next year Archibald Douglas, 6th Earl of Angus, the young king's stepfather, took custody of James and held him as a virtual prisoner for three years, exercising power on his behalf. He finally managed to escape from the custody of the regents in 1528 and began to take revenge on a number of them and their families. He continued his father's policy of subduing the rebellious Highlands, Western and Northern isles and the troublesome borders. He took punitive measures against the Clan Douglas in the north, summarily executed John Armstrong of Liddesdale and carried out royal progresses to underline his authority. He also continued the French Auld alliance that had been in place since the fourteenth century, marrying first the French princess Madeleine of Valois and then after her death Marie of Guise. He increased crown revenues by heavily taxing the church, taking £72,000 in four years, and embarked on a major programme of building at royal palaces. He avoided pursuing the major structural and theological changes to the church undertaken by his contemporary Henry VIII in England. He used the Church as a source of offices for his many illegitimate children and his favourites, particularly David Beaton, who became Archbishop of Saint Andrews and a Cardinal. James V's domestic and foreign policy successes were overshadowed by another disastrous campaign against England that led to an overwhelming defeat at the Battle of Solway Moss (1542). James died a short time later, a demise blamed by contemporaries on "a broken heart". The day before his death, he was brought news of the birth of an heir: a daughter, who would become Mary, Queen of Scots.

==== "Rough Wooing" ====
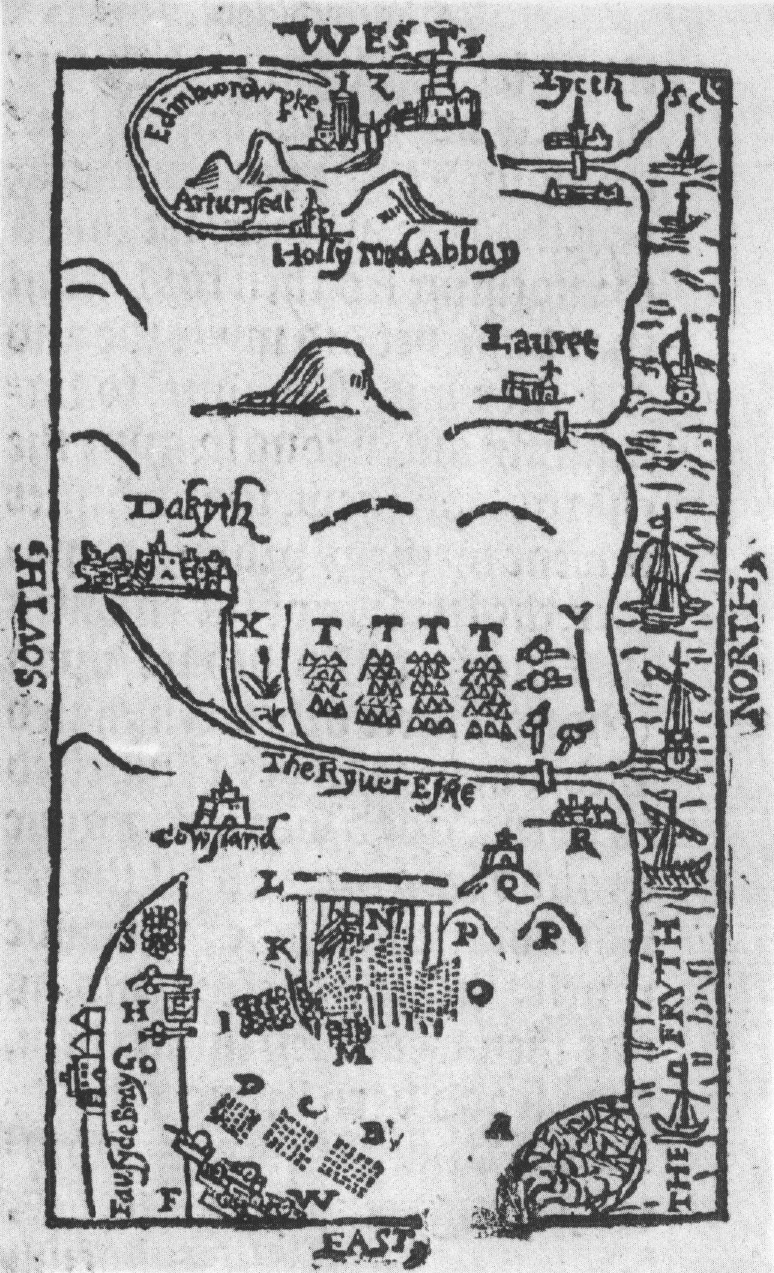
A contemporaneous wood cut of the Battle of Pinkie

At the beginning of the infant Mary's reign, the Scottish political nation was divided between a pro-French faction, led by Cardinal Beaton and by the Queen's mother, Mary of Guise; and a pro-English faction, headed by James Hamilton, Earl of Arran. Failure of the pro-English to deliver a marriage between the infant Mary and Edward, the son of Henry VIII of England, that had been agreed under the Treaty of Greenwich (1543), led within two years to an English invasion to enforce the match, later known as the "rough wooing". This took the form of border skirmishing and several English campaigns into Scotland. In 1547, after the death of Henry VIII, forces under the English regent Edward Seymour, 1st Duke of Somerset were victorious at the Battle of Pinkie, followed up by the occupation of the strategic lowland fortress of Haddington and recruitment of "Assured Scots". Arran and Mary of Guise responded by the Treaty of Haddington. and sent the five-year-old Mary to France, as the intended bride of the dauphin Francis, heir to the French throne. Mary of Guise stayed in Scotland to look after the interests of young Mary – and of France – although Arran acted as regent until 1554.

The arrival of French troops helped stiffen resistance to the English, who abandoned Haddington in September 1549 and, after the fall of Protector Somerset in England, withdrew from Scotland completely. From 1554, Marie of Guise took over the regency, maintaining a difficult position, partly by giving limited toleration to Protestant dissent and attempting to diffuse resentment over the continued presence of French troops. When the Protestant Elizabeth I came to the throne of England in 1558, the English party and the Protestants found their positions aligned and asked for English military support to expel the French. The arrival of the English fleet commanded by William Wynter and English troops led to the besieging of the French forces in Leith, which fell in July 1560. By this point Mary of Guise had died and French and English troops both withdrew under the Treaty of Edinburgh, leaving the young queen in France, but pro-English and Protestant parties in the ascendant.

==== Protestant Reformation ====
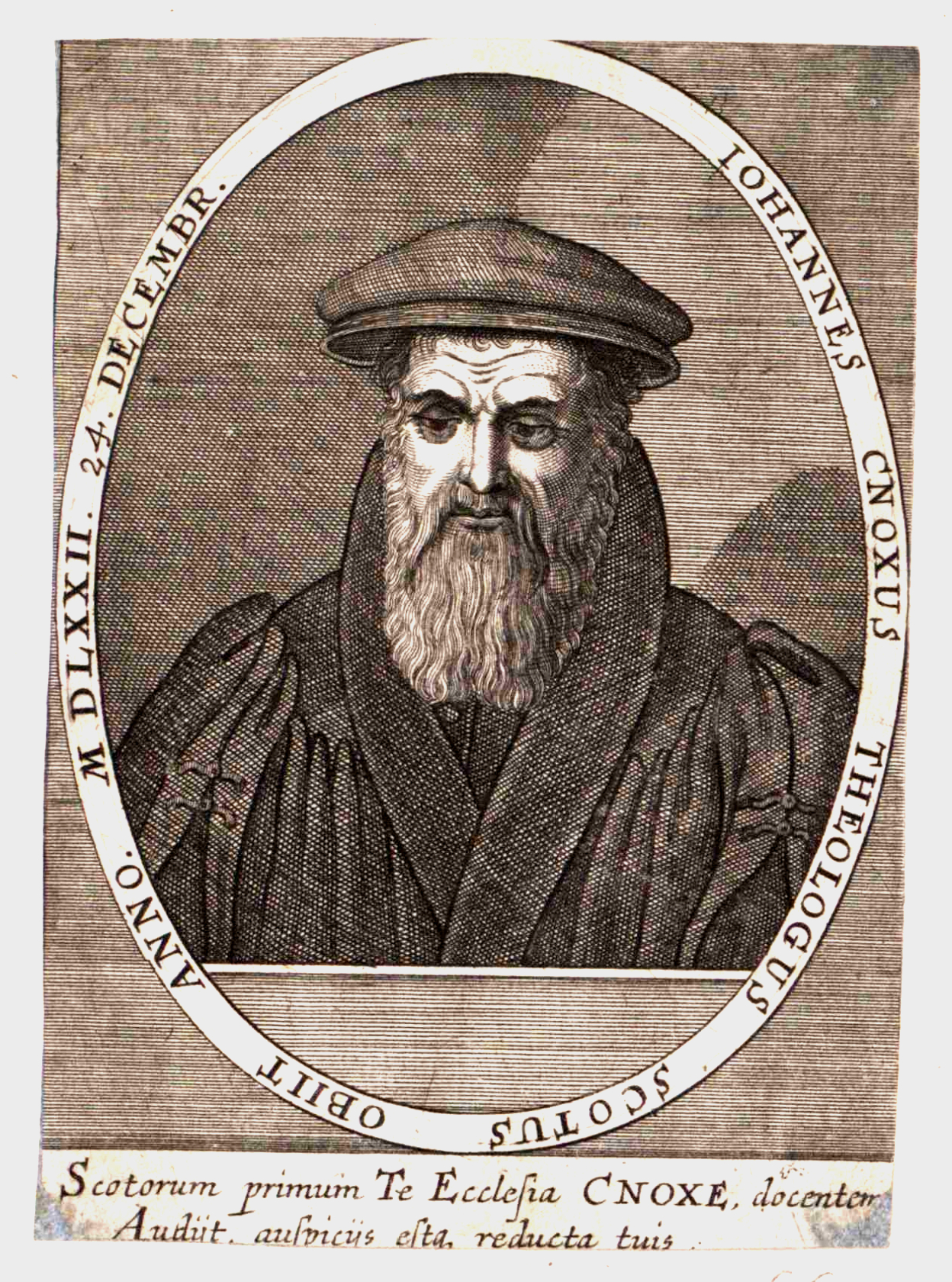
John Knox, the key figure in the Scottish Reformation.

During the sixteenth century, Scotland underwent a Protestant Reformation that created a predominately Calvinist national kirk (church), which was strongly Presbyterian in outlook, severely reducing the powers of bishops, although not abolishing them. In the earlier part of the century, the teachings of first Martin Luther and then John Calvin began to influence Scotland, particularly through Scottish scholars who had visited continental and English universities and who had often trained in the Catholic priesthood. English influence was also more direct, supplying books and distributing Bibles and Protestant literature in the Lowlands when they invaded in 1547. Particularly important was the work of the Lutheran Scot Patrick Hamilton. His execution with other Protestant preachers in 1528, and of the Zwingli-influenced George Wishart in 1546, who was burnt at the stake in St. Andrews on the orders of Cardinal Beaton, did nothing to stem the growth of these ideas. Wishart's supporters, who included a number of Fife lairds, assassinated Beaton soon after and seized St Andrews Castle, which they held for a year before they were defeated with the help of French forces. The survivors, including chaplain John Knox, being condemned to be galley slaves, helping to create resentment of the French and martyrs for the Protestant cause.

Limited toleration and the influence of exiled Scots and Protestants in other countries, led to the expansion of Protestantism, with a group of lairds declaring themselves Lords of the Congregation in 1557 and representing their interests politically. The collapse of the French alliance and English intervention in 1560 meant that a relatively small, but highly influential, group of Protestants were in a position to impose reform on the Scottish church. A confession of faith, rejecting papal jurisdiction and the mass, was adopted by Parliament in 1560, while the young Mary, Queen of Scots, was still in France. Knox, having escaped the galleys and spent time in Geneva, where he had become a follower of Calvin, emerged as the most significant figure. The Calvinism of the reformers led by Knox resulted in a settlement that adopted a Presbyterian system and rejected most of the elaborate trappings of the medieval church. This gave considerable power within the new kirk to local lairds, who often had control over the appointment of the clergy, and resulting in widespread, but generally orderly, iconoclasm. At this point the majority of the population was probably still Catholic in persuasion and the kirk would find it difficult to penetrate the Highlands and Islands, but began a gradual process of conversion and consolidation that, compared with reformations elsewhere, was conducted with relatively little persecution.

==== Mary, Queen of Scots ====
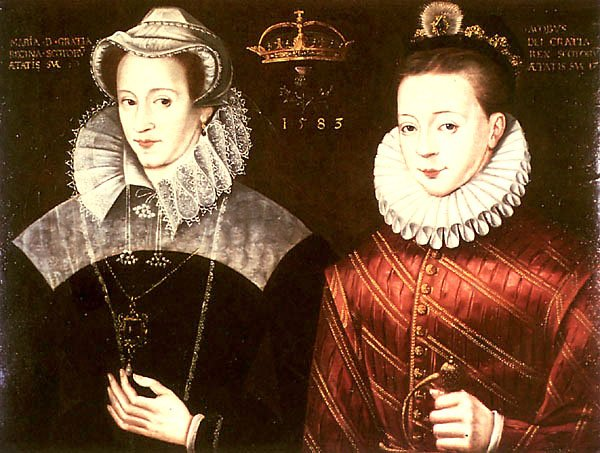
Mary Queen of Scots depicted with her son, James VI and I; in reality, Mary saw her son for the last time when he was ten months old.

While these events progressed Queen Mary had been raised as a Catholic in France, and married to the Dauphin of France, who became king as Francis II in 1559, making her queen consort of France. This also made her family with King Henry and Queen Catherine of France. When Francis died in 1560, Mary, now 19, elected to return to Scotland to take up the government in a hostile environment. Despite her private deeply catholic religion, she did not attempt to re-impose Catholicism on her largely Protestant subjects, thus angering the chief Catholic nobles. Her six-year personal reign was marred by a series of crises, largely caused by the intrigues and rivalries of the leading nobles. The murder of her secretary, David Riccio, was followed by that of her unpopular second husband Lord Darnley, father of her infant son, and her abduction by and marriage to the Earl of Bothwell, who was implicated in Darnley's murder.

Mary and Bothwell confronted the lords at Carberry Hill and after their forces melted away, he fled and she was captured by Bothwell's rivals. Mary was imprisoned in Lochleven Castle, and in July 1567, was forced to abdicate in favour of her 13-month-old son James VI. Mary eventually escaped and attempted to regain the throne by force. After her defeat at the Battle of Langside by forces led by Regent Moray in 1568, she took refuge in England. In Scotland the regents fought a civil war on behalf of the king against his mother's supporters. In England, Mary became a focal point for Catholic conspirators and was eventually tried for treason and executed on the orders of her kinswoman Elizabeth I.

==== James VI ====
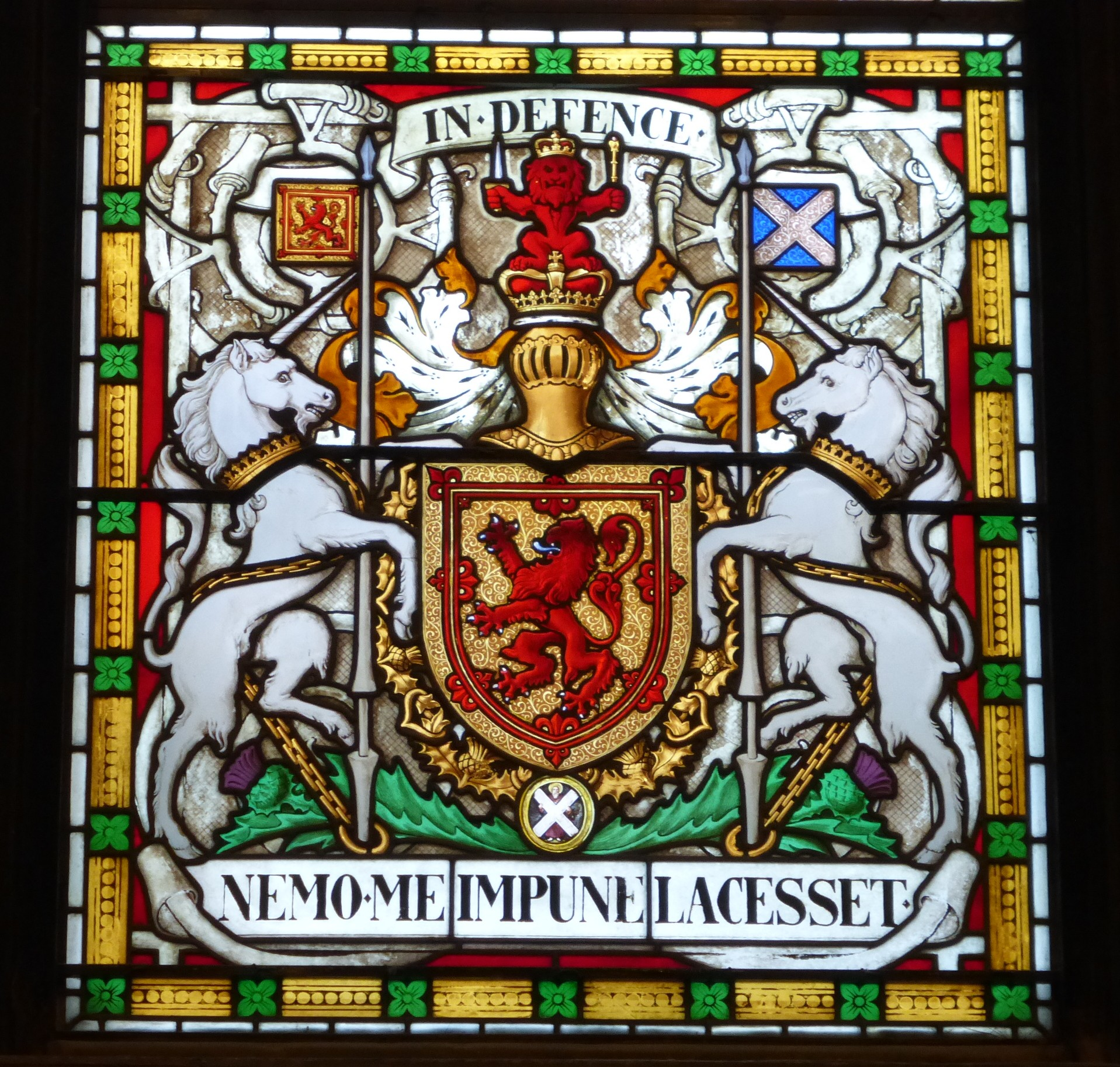
The Royal Arms of Scotland as used until 1603, from a window in Parliament House, Edinburgh

James VI was crowned King of Scots at the age of 13 months on 29 July 1567. He was brought up as a Protestant, while the country was run by a series of regents. In 1579 the Frenchman Esmé Stewart, Sieur d'Aubigny, first cousin of James' father Lord Darnley, arrived in Scotland and quickly established himself as the closest of the then 13-year-old James's powerful male favourites; he was created Earl of Lennox by the king in 1580, and Duke of Lennox in 1581. Lennox was distrusted by Scottish Calvinists and in August 1582, in what became known as the Raid of Ruthven, the Protestant earls of Gowrie and Angus imprisoned James and forced Lennox to leave Scotland. After James was liberated in June 1583, he assumed increasing control of his kingdom. Between 1584 and 1603, he established effective royal government and relative peace among the lords, assisted by John Maitland of Thirlestane, who led the government until 1592. In 1586, James signed the Treaty of Berwick with England, which, with the execution of his mother in 1587, helped clear the way for his succession to the childless Queen Elizabeth I of England. He married Anne of Denmark in 1590, daughter of Frederick II, the king of Denmark; they had two sons and a daughter.

=== Seventeenth century ===
==== Union of Crowns ====
In 1603, James VI King of Scots inherited the throne of the Kingdom of England and left Edinburgh for London where he would reign as James I. The Union was a personal or dynastic union, with the crowns remaining both distinct and separate – despite James' best efforts to create a new "imperial" throne of "Great Britain". James retained a keen interest in Scottish affairs, running the government by the rapid interchange of letters, aided by the establishment of an efficient postal system. He controlled everyday policy through the Privy Council of Scotland and managed the Parliament of Scotland through the Lords of the Articles. He also increasingly controlled the meetings of the Scottish General Assembly and increased the number and powers of the Scottish bishops. In 1618, he held a General Assembly and pushed through Five Articles, which included practices that had been retained in England, but largely abolished in Scotland, most controversially kneeling for the reception of communion. Although ratified, they created widespread opposition and resentment and were seen by many as a step back to Catholic practice. Royal authority was more limited in the Highlands, where periodic violence punctuated relationships between the great families of the MacDonalds, Gordons and McGregors and Campbells. The acquisition of the Irish crown along with the English, facilitated a process of settlement by Scots in what was historically the most troublesome area of the kingdom in Ulster, with perhaps 50,000 Scots settling in the province by the mid-seventeenth century. Attempts to found a Scottish colony in North America in Nova Scotia were largely unsuccessful, with insufficient funds and willing colonists.

==== Charles I ====
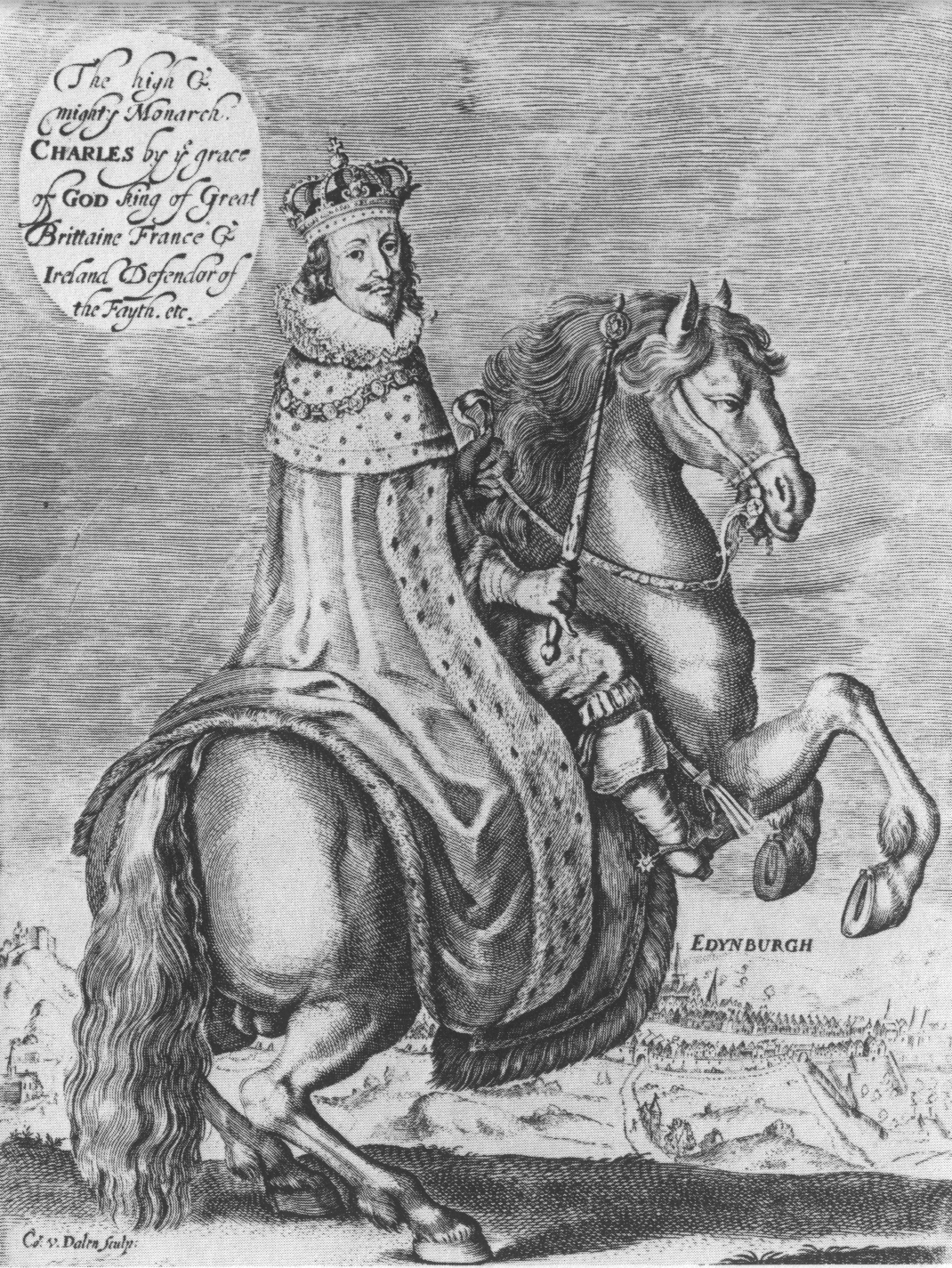
Charles in the year of his Scottish coronation, 1633.

In 1625, James VI died and was succeeded by his son Charles I. Although born in Scotland, Charles had become estranged from his northern kingdom, with his first visit being for his Scottish coronation in 1633, when he was crowned in St Giles Cathedral, Edinburgh with full Anglican rites. Charles had relatively few important Scots in his circle and relied heavily in Scottish matters on the generally mistrusted and often indecisive James Hamilton, 1st Duke of Hamilton and the bishops, particularly John Spottiswood, Archbishop of St. Andrews, eventually making him chancellor. At the beginning of his reign, Charles' revocation of alienated lands since 1542 helped secure the finances of the kirk, but it threatened the holdings of the nobility who had gained from the Reformation settlement. His pushing through of legislation and refusal to hear (or legal pursuit of) those raising objections, created further resentment among the nobility. In England his religious policies caused similar resentment and he ruled without calling a parliament from 1629.

===== Bishops' Wars =====
In 1635, without reference to a general assembly of the Parliament, the king authorised a book of canons that made him head of the Church, ordained an unpopular ritual and enforced the use of a new liturgy. When the liturgy emerged in 1637 it was seen as an English-style Prayer Book, resulting in anger and widespread rioting, said to have been set off with the throwing of a stool by one Jenny Geddes during a service in St Giles Cathedral. The Protestant nobility put themselves at the head of the popular opposition, with Archibald Campbell, Earl of Argyll emerging as a leading figure. Representatives of various sections of Scottish society drew up the National Covenant on 28 February 1638, objecting to the King's liturgical innovations. The king's supporters were unable to suppress the rebellion and the king refused to compromise. In December of the same year matters were taken even further, when at a meeting of the General Assembly in Glasgow the Scottish bishops were formally expelled from the Church, which was then established on a full Presbyterian basis.

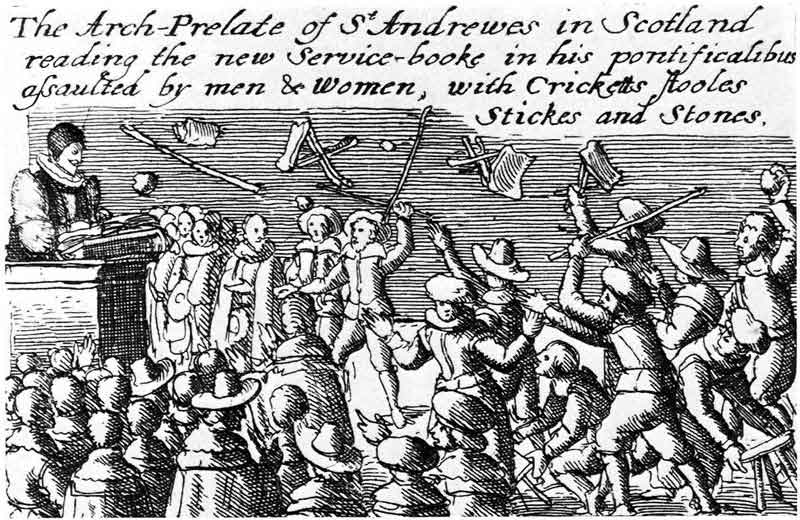
The riots set off by Jenny Geddes in St Giles Cathedral that sparked off the Bishops' Wars

The Scots assembled a force of about 12,000, some of which were returned veterans of the Thirty Years' War, led by Alexander Leslie, formerly the Field Marshal of the Swedish Army. Charles gathered a force of perhaps 20,000, many of which were ill-trained militia. There were a series of minor actions in the north of Scotland, which secured the Covenanter's rear against Royalist support and skirmishing on the border. As neither side wished to push the matter to a full military conflict, a temporary settlement was concluded, known as the Pacification of Berwick in June 1639, and the First Bishops' War ended with the Covenanters retaining control of the country.

In 1640 Charles attempted again to enforce his authority, opening a second Bishops' War. He recalled the English Parliament, known as the Short Parliament, but disbanded it after it declined to vote a new subsidy and was critical of his policies. He assembled a poorly provisioned and poorly trained army. The Scots moved south into England, forcing a crossing of the Tyne at Newburn to the west of Newcastle upon Tyne, then occupying the city and eventually most of Northumbria and Durham. This gave them a stranglehold on the vital coal supply to London. Charles was forced to capitulate, agreeing to most of the Covenanter's demands and paying them £830 a month to support their army. This forced him to recall the English Parliament, known as the Long Parliament, which, in exchange for concessions, raised the sum of £200,000 to be paid to the Scots under the Treaty of Ripon. The Scots army returned home triumphant. The king's attempts to raise a force in Ireland to invade Scotland from the west prompted a widespread revolt there and as the English moved to outright opposition that resulted in the outbreak of the English Civil War in 1642, he was facing rebellion in all three of his realms.

===== Civil wars =====
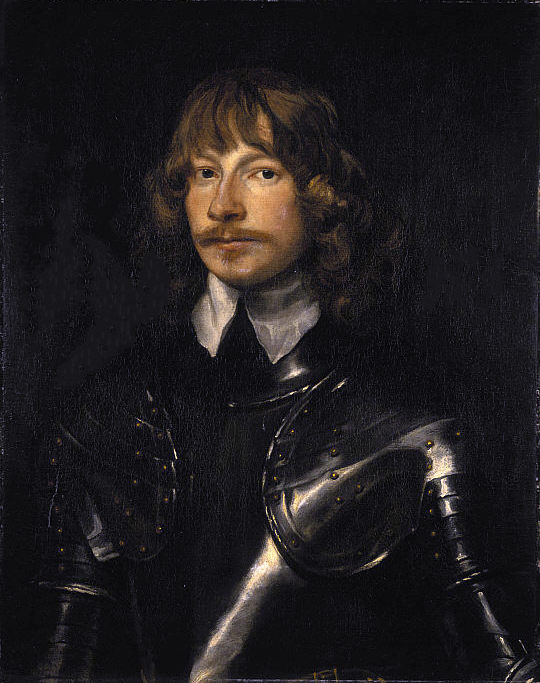
James Graham, 1st Marquess of Montrose, led a successful pro-royalist campaign in the Highlands in 1644–45.

As the civil war in England developed into a long and protracted conflict, both the King and the English Parliamentarians appealed to the Scots for military aid. The Covenanters opted to side with Parliament and in 1643 they entered into a Solemn League and Covenant, guaranteeing the Scottish Church settlement and promising further reform in England. In January 1644 a Scots army of 18,000-foot and 3,000 horse and guns under Leslie crossed the border. It helped turn the tide of the war in the North, forcing the royalist army under the Marquis of Newcastle into York where it was besieged by combined Scots and Parliamentary armies. The Royalists were relieved by a force under Prince Rupert, the King's nephew, but the allies under Leslie's command defeated the Royalists decisively at Marston Moor on 2 July, generally seen as the turning point of the war.

In Scotland, former Covenanter James Graham, 1st Marquess of Montrose led a campaign in favour of the king in the Highlands from 1644. Few Lowland Scots would follow him, but, aided by 1,000 Irish, Highland and Islesmen sent by the Irish Confederates under Alasdair MacDonald (MacColla), he began a highly successful mobile campaign, winning victories over local Covenanter forces at Tippermuir and Aberdeen against local levies; at Inverlochy he crushed the Campbells; at Auldearn, Alford and Kilsyth he defeated well-led and disciplined armies. He was able to dictate terms to the Covenanters, but as he moved south, his forces, depleted by the loss of MacColla and the Highlanders, were caught and decisively defeated at the Battle of Philiphaugh by an army under David Leslie, nephew of Alexander. Escaping to the north, Montrose attempted to continue the struggle with fresh troops. By this point the king had been heavily defeated at the Battle of Naseby by Parliament's reformed New Model Army and surrendered to the Scots forces under Leslie besieging the town of Newark in July 1646. Montrose abandoned the war and left for the continent.

Unable to persuade the king to accept a Presbyterian settlement, the Scots exchanged him for half of the £400,000 they were owed by Parliament and returned home. Relations with the English Parliament and the increasingly independent English army grew strained and the balance of power shifted in Scotland, with Hamilton emerging as the leading figure. In 1647 he brokered the Engagement with the King, now held by the New Model Army, by which the Scots would support him, along with risings in England as part of a Second English Civil War, in exchange for the imposition of Presbyterianism on England on a three-year trial basis. The more hard-line Covenanters of the Kirk Party were defeated at a skirmish at Mauchline Muir in June 1648 and many Covenanters, including Alexander and David Leslie, declined to join the army of 10,000 produced for the Engagement. By the time Hamilton led the Engagement army across the border, most of the English risings been defeated. The Scots were caught by the New Model Army under Cromwell on the march between Warrington and Preston. In the Battle of Preston, the Scots were defeated and many captured, with Hamilton subsequently executed. After the coup of the Whiggamore Raid, the Kirk Party regained control in Scotland. However, the eventual response of Cromwell and the army leaders now in power in England to the second civil war was the execution of the king in January 1649, despite Scottish protests.

==== Occupation and the Commonwealth ====
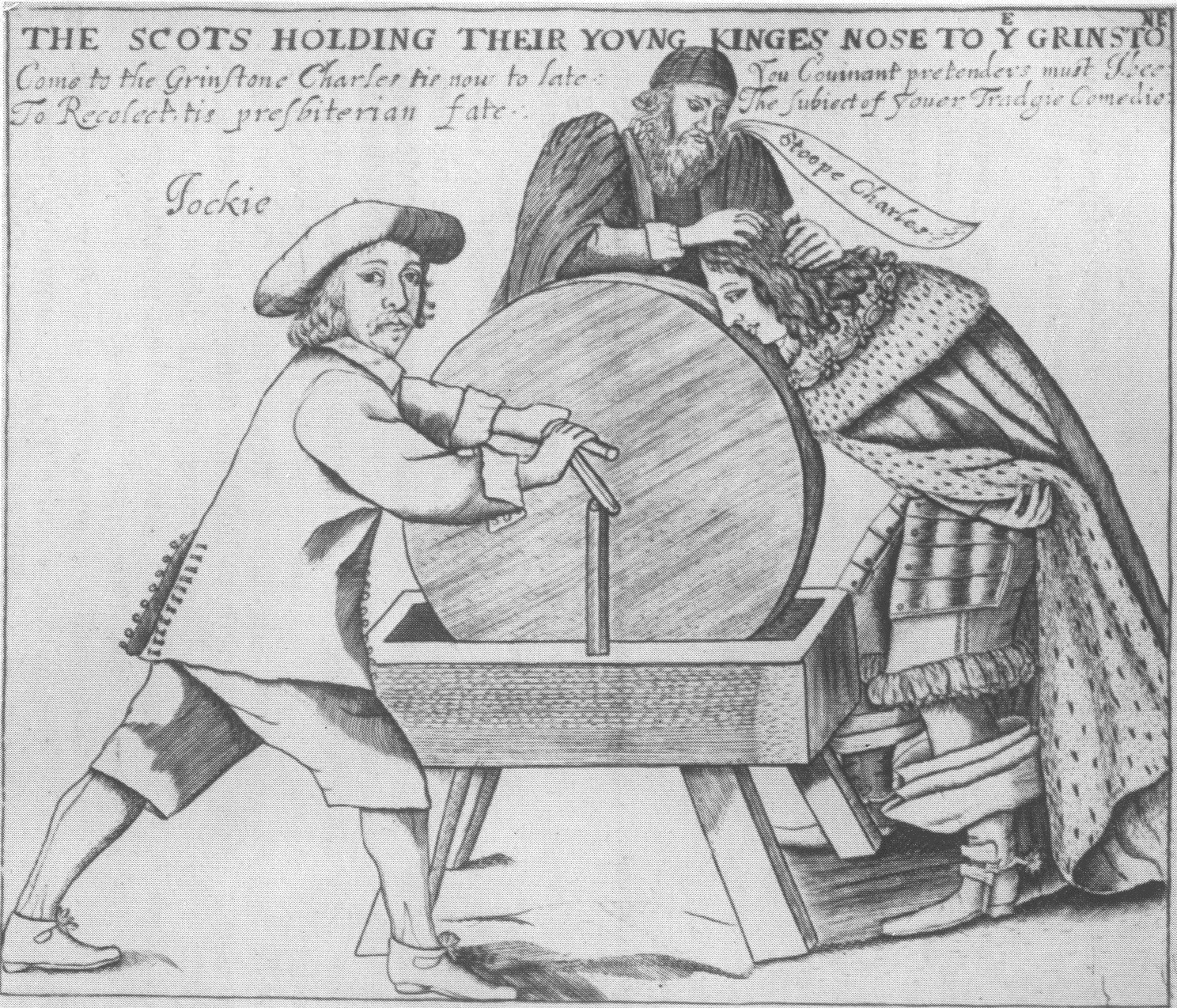
The Scots holding the young Charles II's nose to the grindstone of the Engagement, from a satirical English pamphlet.

While England was declared a Commonwealth, as soon as news of Charles I's execution reached Scotland, his son was proclaimed king as Charles II. In 1650 Montrose attempted another rising in the Highlands in the name of the King, but it ended disastrously, with Montrose being executed. Lacking tangible support from his relatives on the continent or his supporters in England, Charles accepted the offer from the Covenanters, arriving in June 1650 and signing the Covenants. The English responded with an army of 16,000 under Cromwell, which crossed the border in July 1650, while an English fleet acted in support. On 3 September 1650 the English army defeated the Scots under David Leslie at the Battle of Dunbar, taking over 10,000 prisoners and then occupying Edinburgh, taking control of the Lowlands. Charles could now more easily make an alliance with the moderate Covenanters. He was crowned at Scone on 1 January 1651 and a new army was assembled. In June 1651 Cromwell advanced against the Scots under Leslie at Stirling. The Scots army with the King set off for England, but there was no rising in their favour and the army was caught at Worcester on 3 September. It was decisively defeated, bringing the civil wars to an end. Charles escaped to the continent, an English army occupied Scotland and Cromwell emerged as the most important figure in the Commonwealth.

In 1652, the English parliament declared that Scotland was part of the Commonwealth. Various attempts were made to legitimise the union, calling representatives from the Scottish burghs and shires to negotiations and to various English parliaments, where they were always under-represented and had little opportunity for dissent. However, final ratification was delayed by Cromwell's problems with his various parliaments and the union did not become the subject of an act until 1657. The military administration in Scotland, led by General George Monck, was relatively successful. It managed to enforce law and order, suppressing the banditry of the Moss-troopers and enforcing a form of limited religious toleration, but by introducing English judges largely suspending the Scots law. In 1653–55 there was a major Royalist rising in the Highlands led by William Cunningham, 9th Earl of Glencairn and John Middleton, which was defeated at the Battle of Dalnaspidal on 19 July 1654.

==== Restoration ====
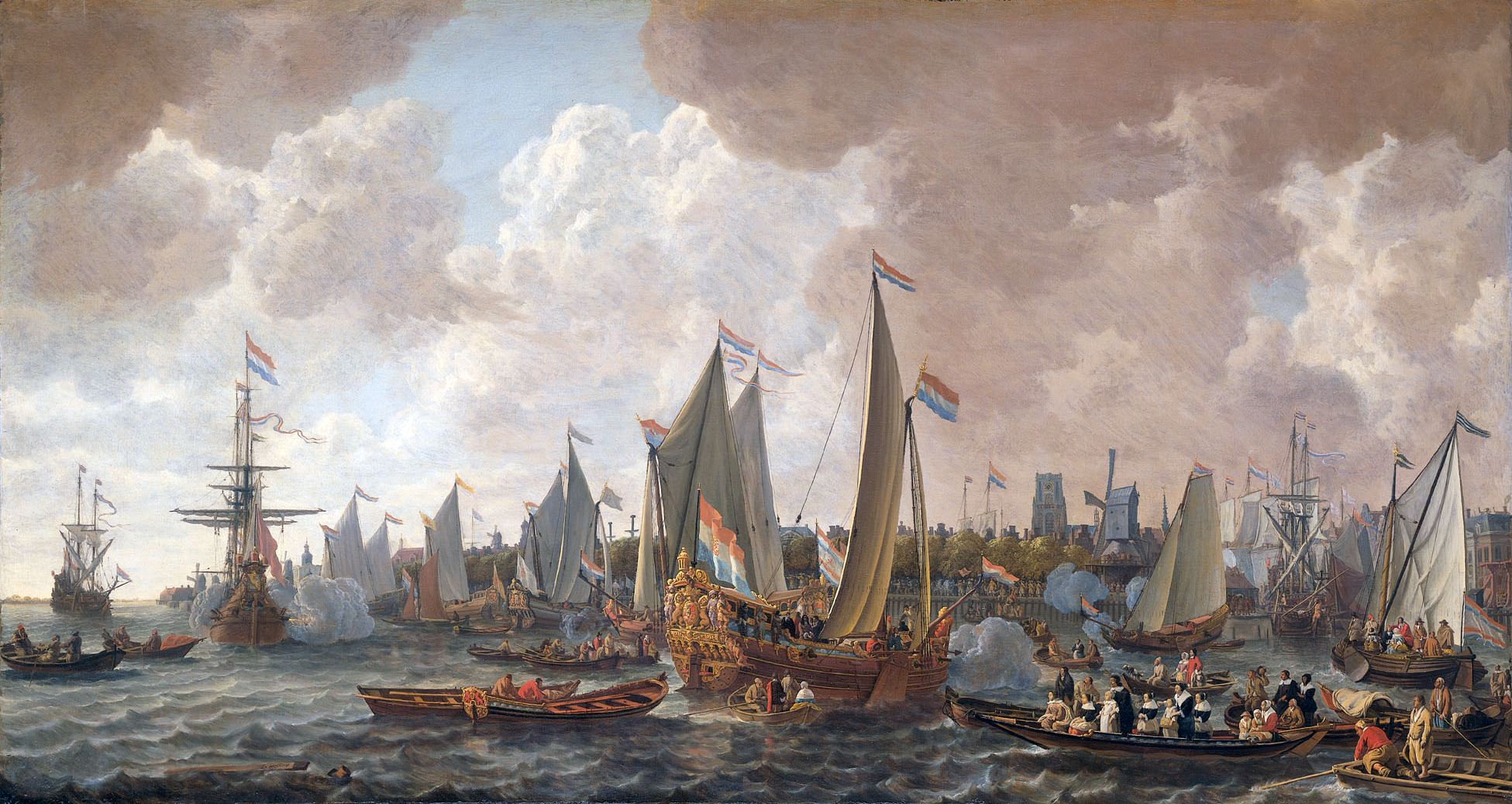
Charles II sailing from his exile in the Netherlands to his Restoration in England in May 1660. Painting by Lieve Verschuier

After the death of Cromwell in 1658, Monck remained aloof from the manoeuvring in London that led to the brief establishment of a regime under Richard Cromwell and the subsequent contest for power between army leaders. In 1659 he opened negotiations with Charles II and began a slow march south with his army. He then restored the English Long Parliament, which, having received assurances, voted for a restoration of the monarchy and then dissolved itself, creating a de facto restoration of the monarchy in Scotland, but without safeguards. In the event Scotland regained its system of law, parliament and kirk, but also the Lords of the Articles, bishops and a king who did not visit the country and ruled largely without reference to Parliament through a series of commissioners. These began with Middleton, now an earl and ended with the king's brother and heir, James, Duke of York (known in Scotland as the Duke of Albany). Legislation was revoked back to 1633, removing the Covenanter gains of the Bishops' Wars, but the discipline of kirk sessions, presbyteries and synods were renewed. Only four Covenanters were executed, the most prominent being Argyll. The reintroduction of episcopacy was a source of particular trouble in the south-west of the country, an area with strong Presbyterian sympathies. Abandoning the official church, many of the people here began to attend illegal field assemblies led by excluded ministers, known as conventicles. Official attempts to suppress these led to a rising in 1679, defeated by James, Duke of Monmouth, the King's illegitimate son, at the Battle of Bothwell Bridge. In the early 1680s a more intense phase of persecution began, in what was later to be known in Protestant historiography as "the Killing Time", with dissenters summarily executed by the dragoons of James Graham, Laird of Claverhouse or sentenced to transportation or death by Sir George Mackenzie, the Lord Advocate. In England, the Exclusion crisis of 1678–1681 divided political society into Whigs (given their name after the Scottish Whigamores), who attempted, unsuccessfully, to exclude the openly Catholic Duke of Albany from the succession, and the Tories, who opposed them. Similar divisions began to emerge in Scottish political life.

==== Deposition of James VII ====
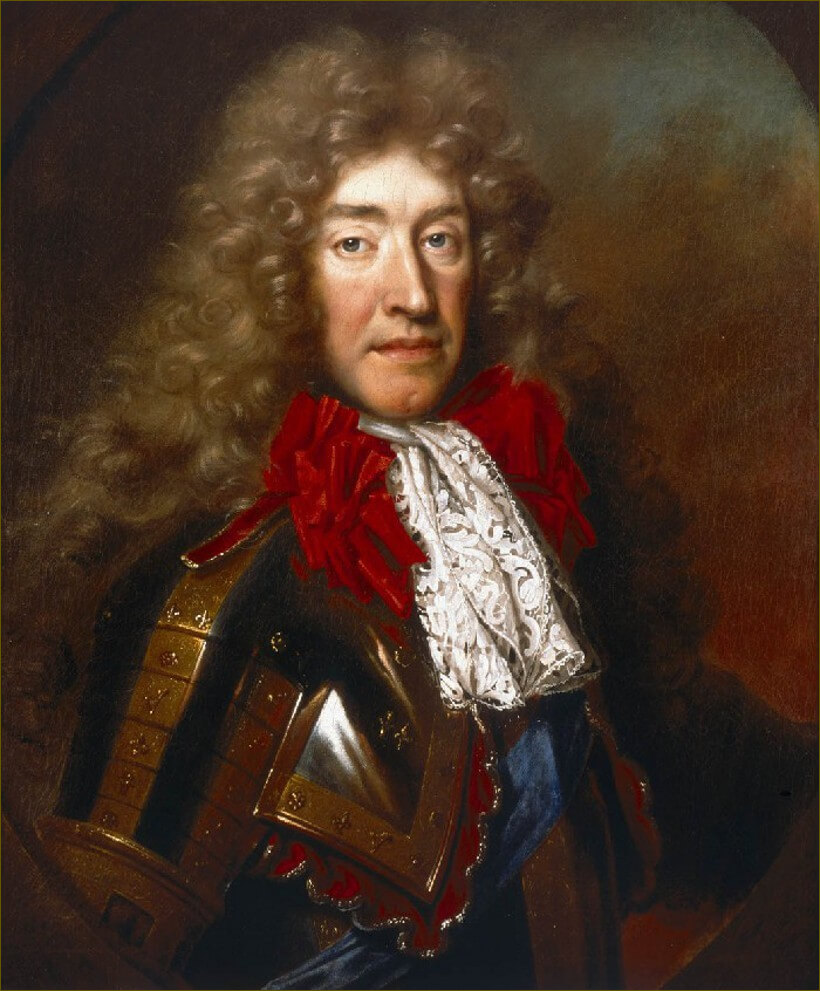
James VII of Scotland (and II of England), who was deposed in 1688

Charles died in 1685 and his brother succeeded him as James VII of Scotland (and II of England). James put Catholics in key positions in the government and even attendance at a conventicle was made punishable by death. He disregarded parliament, purged the council and forced through religious toleration to Roman Catholics, alienating his Protestant subjects. The failure of an invasion, led by Archibald Campbell, 9th Earl of Argyll, and timed to co-ordinate with the Duke of Monmouth's rebellion in England, demonstrated the strength of the regime. It was believed that the king would be succeeded by his daughter Mary, a Protestant and the wife of William of Orange, Stadtholder of the Netherlands, but when in 1688, James produced a male heir, James Francis Edward Stuart, it was clear that his policies would outlive him. An invitation by seven leading Englishmen led William to land in England with 40,000 men, and James fled, leading to the almost bloodless "Glorious Revolution". William called the Estates in Scotland, and as his supporters proved dominant, James' support collapsed. The Estates issued a Claim of Right that suggested that James had forfeited the crown by his actions (in contrast to England, which relied on the legal fiction of an abdication) and offered it to William and Mary, which William accepted, along with limitations on royal power. The final settlement restored Presbyterianism and abolished the bishops, who had generally supported James. However, William, who was more tolerant than the kirk tended to be, passed acts restoring the Episcopalian clergy excluded after the Revolution.

Although William's supporters dominated the government, there remained a significant following for James, particularly in the Highlands. His cause, which became known as Jacobitism, from the Latin (Jacobus) for James, led to a series of risings. An initial Jacobite military attempt was led by John Graham, now Viscount Dundee. His forces, almost all Highlanders, defeated William's forces at the Battle of Killiecrankie in 1689, but they took heavy losses and Dundee was slain in the fighting. Without his leadership the Jacobite army was soon defeated at the Battle of Dunkeld. The complete defeat of James in Ireland by William at the Battle of Aughrim (1691), ended the first phase of the Jacobite military effort. In the aftermath of the Jacobite defeat on 13 February 1692 in an incident known as the Massacre of Glencoe, 38 members of the Clan MacDonald of Glencoe were killed by members of the Earl of Argyll's Regiment of Foot, who had accepted their hospitality, on the grounds that they had not been prompt in pledging allegiance to the new monarchs.

==== Economic crisis and overseas colonies ====
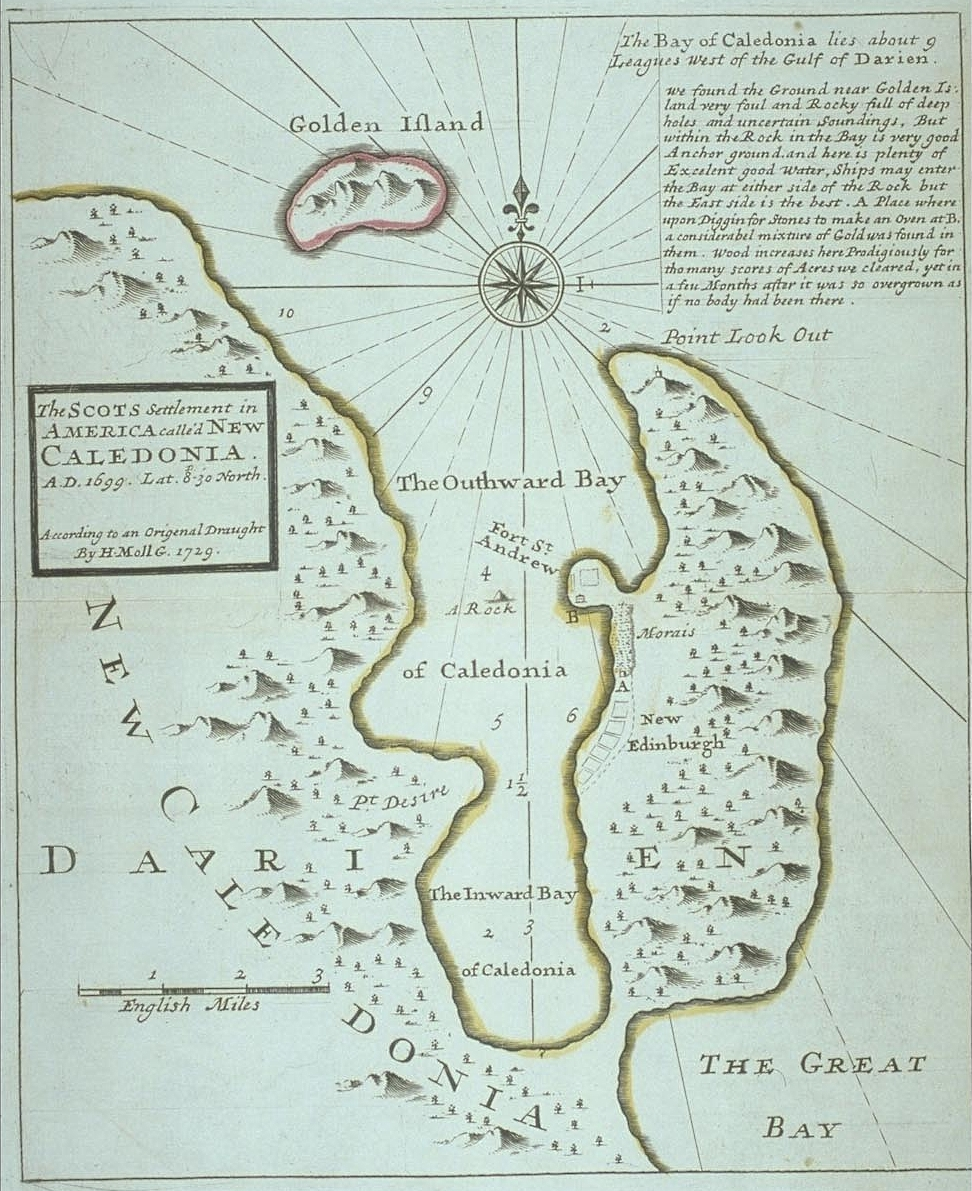
The colony of New Caledonia on the Isthmus of Darien

The closing decade of the seventeenth century saw the generally favourable economic conditions that had dominated since the Restoration come to an end. There was a slump in trade with the Baltic and France from 1689 to 1691, caused by French protectionism and changes in the Scottish cattle trade, followed by four years of failed harvests (1695, 1696 and 1698–99), known as the "seven ill years". The result was severe famine and depopulation, particularly in the north. The Parliament of Scotland of 1695 enacted proposals that might help the desperate economic situation, including setting up the Bank of Scotland. The "Company of Scotland Trading to Africa and the Indies" received a charter to raise capital through public subscription.

The "Company of Scotland" invested in the Darien scheme, an ambitious plan devised by William Paterson, the Scottish founder of the Bank of England, to build a colony on the Isthmus of Panama in the hope of establishing trade with the Far East. The Darién scheme won widespread support in Scotland as the landed gentry and the merchant class were in agreement in seeing overseas trade and colonialism as routes to upgrade Scotland's economy. Since the capital resources of the Edinburgh merchants and landholder elite were insufficient, the company appealed to middling social ranks, who responded with patriotic fervour to the call for money; the lower orders volunteered as colonists. However, both the English East India Company and the English government opposed the idea. The East India Company saw the venture as a potential commercial threat and the government were involved in the War of the Grand Alliance from 1689 to 1697 against France and did not want to offend Spain, which claimed the territory as part of New Granada and the English investors withdraw. Returning to Edinburgh, the Company raised £400,000 in a few weeks. Three small fleets with a total of 3,000 men eventually set out for Panama in 1698. The exercise proved a disaster. Poorly equipped; beset by incessant rain; suffering from disease; under attack by the Spanish from nearby Cartagena; and refused aid by the English in the West Indies, the colonists abandoned their project in 1700. Only 1,000 survived and only one ship managed to return to Scotland. The cost of £150,000 put a severe strain on the Scottish commercial system and led to widespread anger against England, while, seeing the impossibility of two economic policies, William was prompted to argue for political union shortly before his death in 1702.

=== Early eighteenth century ===
==== Union with England ====
Union flag, combing the Cross of St George or England, with the Cross of St. Andrew of Scotland.

William's successor was Mary's sister Princess Anne, who had no surviving children and so the Protestant succession seemed in doubt. The English Parliament passed the Act of Settlement 1701, which fixed the succession on Sophia of Hanover and her descendants. However, the Scottish Parliament's parallel Act of Security 1704, merely prohibited a Roman Catholic successor, leaving open the possibility that the crowns would diverge. Rather than risk the possible return of James Francis Edward Stuart, then living in France, the English parliament pressed for full union of the two countries, passing the Alien Act 1705, which threatened to make all Scotsmen unable to hold property in England unless moves toward union were made and would have severely damaged the cattle and linen trades. A political union between Scotland and England also became economically attractive, promising to open up the much larger markets of England, as well as those of the growing Empire. However, there was widespread, if disunited opposition and mistrust in the general population. Sums paid to Scottish commissioners and leading political figure have been described as bribes, but the existence of direct bribes is disputed.

The Scottish parliament voted on 6 January 1707, by 110 to 69, to adopt the Treaty of Union. The treaty confirmed the Hanoverian succession. The Church of Scotland and Scottish law and courts remained separate. The English and Scottish parliaments were replaced by a combined Parliament of Great Britain, but it sat in Westminster and largely continued English traditions without interruption. Forty-five Scots were added to the 513 members of the House of Commons and 16 Scots to the 190 members of the House of Lords. It was also a full economic union, replacing the Scottish systems of currency, taxation and laws regulating trade. The Privy Council was abolished, which meant that effective government in Scotland lay in the hands of unofficial "managers", who attempted to control elections in Scotland and voting by Scottish MPs and lords in line with the prevailing party in Westminster, through a complex process of patronage, venality and coercion. Since the Tories were suspected of Jacobite sympathies, management tended to fall to one of the two groups of Whigs, the "Old Party" or "Argathelian", led by John Campbell, 2nd Duke of Argyll, and the "Squadrone" or "Patriots", initially led by John Ker, 1st Duke of Roxburghe, who became the first Secretary of State for Scotland. Roxburghe was replaced by Argyll in 1725 and he and his brother Archibald Campbell, 1st Earl of Ilay, who succeeded him as 3rd Duke of Argyll in 1743, dominated Scottish politics in the first half of the eighteenth century. Both wings of the Whig movement were forced together by the Jacobite rising in 1745 and the post of Secretary of State was abolished in 1746, but Argyll remained the "uncrowned king of Scotland" until his death in 1761.

==== Jacobite risings ====
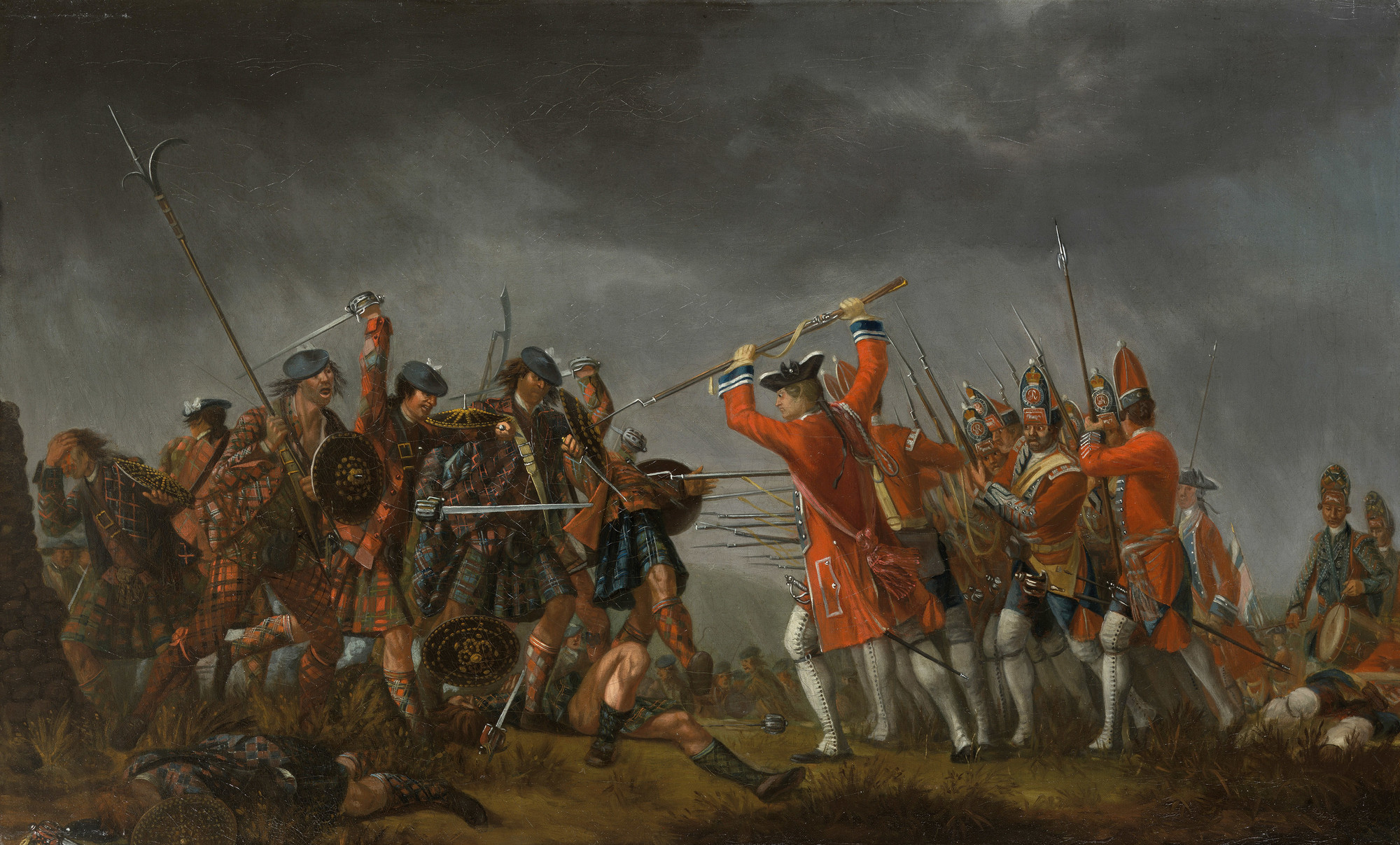
David Morier's depiction of the Battle of Culloden - An Incident in the Rebellion of 1745.

Jacobitism was revived by the unpopularity of the union. In 1708 James Francis Edward Stuart, the son of James VII, who became known as "The Old Pretender", attempted an invasion with a French fleet carrying 6,000 men, but the Royal Navy prevented it from landing troops. A more serious attempt occurred in 1715, soon after the death of Anne and the accession of the first Hanoverian king, the eldest son of Sophie, as George I of Great Britain. This rising (known as The 'Fifteen) envisaged simultaneous uprisings in Wales, Devon, and Scotland. However, government arrests forestalled the southern ventures. In Scotland, John Erskine, Earl of Mar, nicknamed Bobbin' John, raised the Jacobite clans but proved to be an indecisive leader and an incompetent soldier. Mar captured Perth, but let a smaller government force under the Duke of Argyll hold the Stirling plain. Part of Mar's army joined up with risings in northern England and southern Scotland, and the Jacobites fought their way into England before being defeated at the Battle of Preston, surrendering on 14 November 1715. The day before, Mar had failed to defeat Argyll at the Battle of Sheriffmuir. At this point, James belatedly landed in Scotland, but was advised that the cause was hopeless. He fled back to France. An attempted Jacobite invasion with Spanish assistance in 1719 met with little support from the clans and ended in defeat at the Battle of Glen Shiel.

In 1745 the Jacobite rising known as The 'Forty-Five began. Charles Edward Stuart, son of the Old Pretender, often referred to as Bonnie Prince Charlie or the Young Pretender, landed on the island of Eriskay in the Outer Hebrides. Several clans unenthusiastically joined him. At the outset he was successful, taking Edinburgh and then defeating the only government army in Scotland at the Battle of Prestonpans. The Jacobite army marched into England, took Carlisle and advanced as far as south as Derby. However, it became increasingly evident that England would not support a Roman Catholic Stuart monarch. The Jacobite leadership had a crisis of confidence and they retreated to Scotland as two English armies closed in and Hanoverian troops began to return from the continent. Charles' position in Scotland began to deteriorate as the Whig supporters rallied and regained control of Edinburgh. After an unsuccessful attempt on Stirling, he retreated north towards Inverness. He was pursued by the Duke of Cumberland and gave battle with an exhausted army at Culloden on 16 April 1746, where the Jacobite cause was crushed. Charles hid in Scotland with the aid of Highlanders until September 1746, when he escaped back to France. There were bloody reprisals against his supporters and foreign powers abandoned the Jacobite cause, with the court in exile forced to leave France. The Old Pretender died in 1760 and the Young Pretender, without legitimate issue, in 1788. When his brother, Henry, Cardinal of York, died in 1807, the Jacobite cause was at an end.

== Geography ==
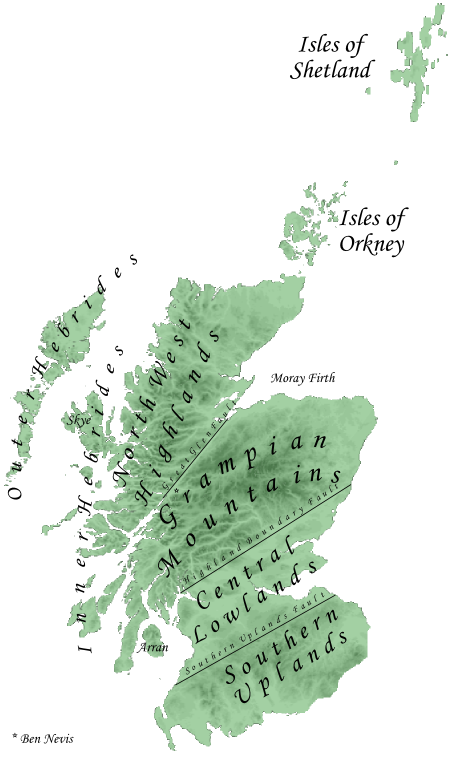
The topography of Scotland.

The defining factor in the geography of Scotland is the distinction between the Highlands and Islands in the north and west and the Lowlands in the south and east. The highlands are further divided into the Northwest Highlands and the Grampian Mountains by the fault line of the Great Glen. The Lowlands are divided into the fertile belt of the Central Lowlands and the higher terrain of the Southern Uplands, which included the Cheviot Hills, over which the border with England ran. The Central Lowland belt averages about 50 miles in width and, because it contains most of the good quality agricultural land and has easier communications, could support most of the urbanisation and elements of conventional government. However, the Southern Uplands, and particularly the Highlands were economically less productive and much more difficult to govern. The Uplands and Highlands had a relatively short growing season, in the extreme case of the upper Grampians an ice free season of four months or less and for much of the Highlands and Uplands of seven months or less. The early modern period also saw the impact of the Little Ice Age, with 1564 seeing thirty-three days of continual frost, where rivers and lochs froze, leading to a series of subsistence crisis until the 1690s.

Most roads in the Lowlands were maintained by justices from a monetary levy on landholders and work levy on tenants. The development of national grain prices indicates the network had improved considerably by the early eighteenth century. In the Highlands and Galloway in the early eighteenth century, a series of military roads were built and maintained by the central government, with the aim of facilitating the movement of troops in the event of rebellion. The extent and borders of the kingdom had been fixed in their modern form by the beginning of the sixteenth century. The exception, the debatable lands at the Western end of the border with England, were settled by a French led commission in 1552 and the Scots' Dike built to mark the boundary. The accession of James VI to the English throne made the border less significant in military terms, becoming, in his phrase the "middle shires" of Great Britain, but it remained a jurisdictional and tariff boundary until the Act of Union in 1707.

== Economy ==
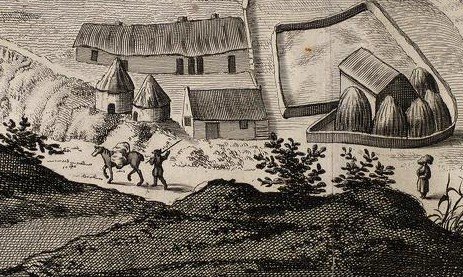
A Scottish Lowland farm c. 1690

At the beginning of the era, with difficult terrain, poor roads and methods of transport there was little trade between different areas of the country and most settlements depended on what was produced locally, often with very little in reserve in bad years. Most farming was based on the lowland fermtoun or highland baile, settlements of a handful of families that jointly farmed an area notionally suitable for two or three plough teams, allocated in run rigs to tenant farmers. They usually ran downhill so that they included both wet and dry land, helping to offset the problems of extreme weather conditions. Most ploughing was done with a heavy wooden plough with an iron coulter, pulled by oxen, which were more effective and cheaper to feed than horses. From the mid-sixteenth century, Scotland experienced a decline in demand for exports of cloth and wool to the continent. Scots responded by selling larger quantities of traditional goods, increasing the output of salt, herring and coal. The late sixteenth century was an era of economic distress, probably exacerbated by increasing taxation and the devaluation of the currency. In 1582 a pound of silver produced 640 shillings, but in 1601 it was 960 and the exchange rate with England was £6 Scots to £1 sterling in 1565, but by 1601 it had fallen to £12. Wages rose rapidly, by between four or five times between 1560 and the end of the century, but failed to keep pace with inflation. This situation was punctuated by frequent harvest failures, with almost half the years in the second half of the sixteenth century seeing local or national scarcity, necessitating the shipping of large quantities of grain from the Baltic. Distress was exacerbated by outbreaks of plague, with major epidemics in the periods 1584–88 and 1597–1609. There were the beginnings of industrial manufacture in this period, often using expertise from the continent, which included a failed attempt to use Flemings to teach new techniques in the developing cloth industry in the north-east, but more successful in bringing a Venetian to help develop a native glass blowing industry. George Bruce used German techniques to solve the drainage problems of his coal mine at Culross. In 1596 the Society of Brewers was established in Edinburgh and the importing of English hops allowed the brewing of Scottish beer.

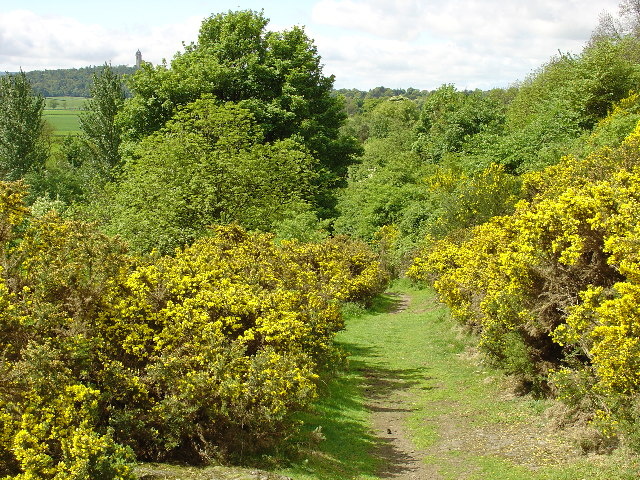
A section of drover's road at Cotkerse near Blairlogie, Scotland

In the early seventeenth century famine was relatively common, with four periods of famine prices between 1620 and 1625. The invasions of the 1640s had a profound impact on the Scottish economy, with the destruction of crops and the disruption of markets resulting in some of the most rapid price rises of the century. Under the Commonwealth, the country was relatively highly taxed, but gained access to English markets. After the Restoration the formal frontier with England was re-established, along with its customs duties. Economic conditions were generally favourable from 1660 to 1688, as land owners promoted better tillage and cattle-raising. The monopoly of royal burghs over foreign trade was partially ended by and Act of 1672, leaving them with the old luxuries of wines, silk, spices and dyes and opening up trade of increasingly significant salt, coal, corn and hides and imports from the Americas. The English Navigation Acts limited the ability of the Scots to engage in what would have been lucrative trading with England's growing colonies, but these were often circumvented, with Glasgow becoming an increasingly important commercial centre, opening up trade with the American colonies: importing sugar from the West Indies and tobacco from Virginia and Maryland. Exports across the Atlantic included linen, woollen goods, coal and grindstones. The English protective tariffs on salt and cattle were harder to disregard and probably placed greater limitations on the Scottish economy, despite attempts of the King to have it overturned. However, by the end of the century the drovers roads, stretching down from the Highlands through south-west Scotland to north-east England, had become firmly established. Scottish attempts to counter this with tariffs of their own, were largely unsuccessful as Scotland had relatively few vital exports to protect. Attempts by the Privy Council to build up luxury industries in cloth mills, soap works, sugar boiling houses, gunpowder and paper works, proved largely unsuccessful. The famines of the 1690s were seen as particularly severe, partly because famine had become relatively rare in the second half of the seventeenth century, with only one year of dearth (in 1674) and the shortages of the 1690s would be the last of their kind.

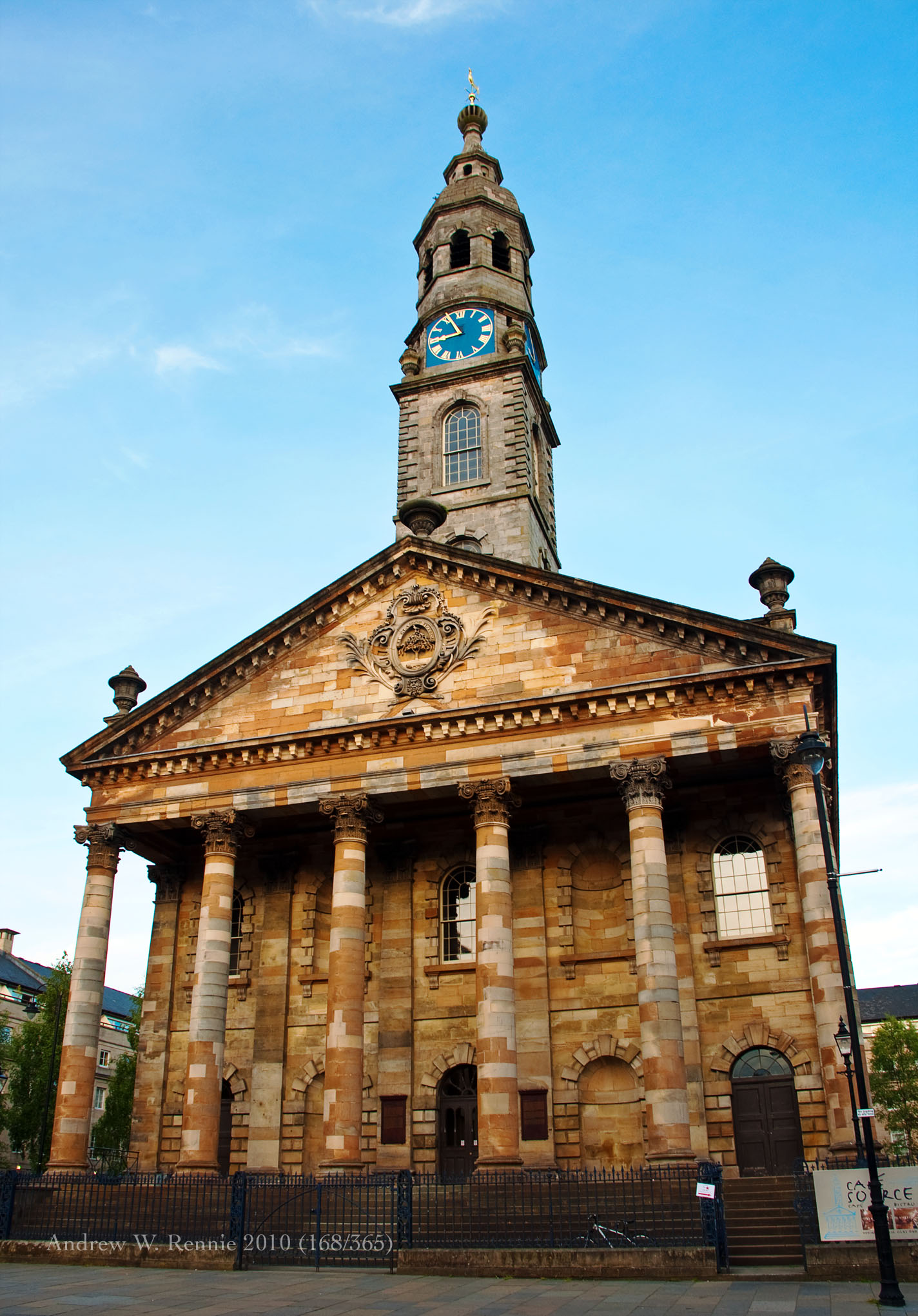
St Andrew's in the Square, Glasgow, built (1739–56) with money by the Tobacco Lords, demonstrates their financial power

At the union of 1707 England had about five times the population of Scotland, and about 36 times as much wealth, however, Scotland began to experience the beginnings of economic expansion that would begin to allow it to close this gap. Contacts with England led to a conscious attempt to improve agriculture among the gentry and nobility. Haymaking was introduced along with the English plough and foreign grasses, the sowing of rye grass and clover. Turnips and cabbages were introduced, lands enclosed and marshes drained, lime was put down, roads built and woods planted. Drilling and sowing and crop rotation were introduced. The introduction of the potato to Scotland in 1739 greatly improved the diet of the peasantry. Enclosures began to displace the runrig system and free pasture. The Society of Improvers was founded in 1723, including in its 300 members dukes, earls, lairds and landlords. The Lothians became a major centre of grain, Ayrshire of cattle breading and the borders of sheep. However, although some estate holders improved the quality of life of their displaced workers, enclosures led to unemployment and forced migrations to the burghs or abroad.

The major change in international trade was the rapid expansion of the Americas as a market. Glasgow supplied the colonies with cloth, iron farming implements and tools, glass and leather goods. Initially relying on hired ships, by 1736 it had 67 of its own, a third of which were trading with the New World. Glasgow emerged as the focus of the tobacco trade, re-exporting particularly to France. The merchants dealing in this lucrative business became the wealthy tobacco lords, who dominated the city for most of the century. Other burghs also benefited. Greenock enlarged its port in 1710 and sent its first ship to the Americas in 1719, but was soon playing a major part in importing sugar and rum. Cloth manufacture was largely domestic. Rough plaids were produced, but the most important areas of manufacturing was linen, particularly in the Lowlands, with some commentators suggesting that Scottish flax was superior to Dutch. The Scottish members of parliament managed to see off an attempt to impose an export duty on linen and from 1727 it received subsidies of £2,750 a year for six years, resulting in a considerable expansion of the trade. Paisley adopted Dutch methods and became a major centre of production. Glasgow manufactured for the export trade, which doubled between 1725 and 1738. The move of the British Linen Company in 1746 into advancing cash credits also stimulated production. The trade was soon being managed by "manufacturers" who supplied flax to spinners, bought back the yarn and then supplied to the weavers and then bought the cloth they produced and resold that. Banking also developed in this period. The Bank of Scotland, founded in 1695 was suspected of Jacobite sympathies and so a rival Royal Bank of Scotland was founded in 1727. Local banks began to be established in burghs like Glasgow and Ayr. These would make capital available for business and the improvement of roads and trade.

== Society ==
=== Social structure ===
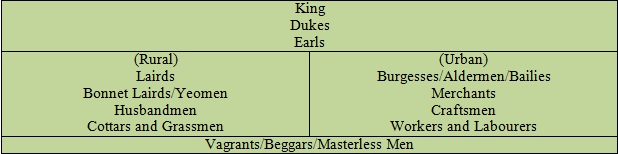
A table of ranks in early modern Scottish society

Below the king were a small number of dukes (usually descended from very close relatives of the king) and earls, who formed the senior nobility. Under them were the barons, who in this period were beginning to merge with the local tenants-in-chief to become lairds a group roughly equivalent to the English gentlemen. Below the lairds were a variety of groups, often ill-defined. These included yeomen, sometimes called "bonnet lairds", often owning substantial land. The practice of fueing (by which a tenant paid an entry sum and an annual feu duty, but could pass the land on to their heirs) meant that the number of people holding heritable possession of lands, which had previously been controlled by the church or nobility expanded. These and the lairds probably numbered about 10,000 by the seventeenth century and became what the government defined as heritors, on whom the financial and legal burdens of local government would increasingly fall. Below the substantial landholders were the husbandmen, lesser landholders and free tenants, who were often described as cottars and grassmen, that made up the majority of the working population. Serfdom had died out in Scotland in the fourteenth century, but was virtually restored by statute law for miners and saltworkers. Through the system of courts baron and kirk sessions, landlords still exerted considerable control over their tenants. Society in the burghs was headed by wealthier merchants, who often held local office as a burgess, alderman, bailies, or as a member of the council. Below them were craftsmen and workers that made up the majority of the urban population. At the bottom of society were the masterless men, the unemployed and vagrants, whose numbers were swelled in times of economic downturn or hardship.

=== Kinship and clans ===
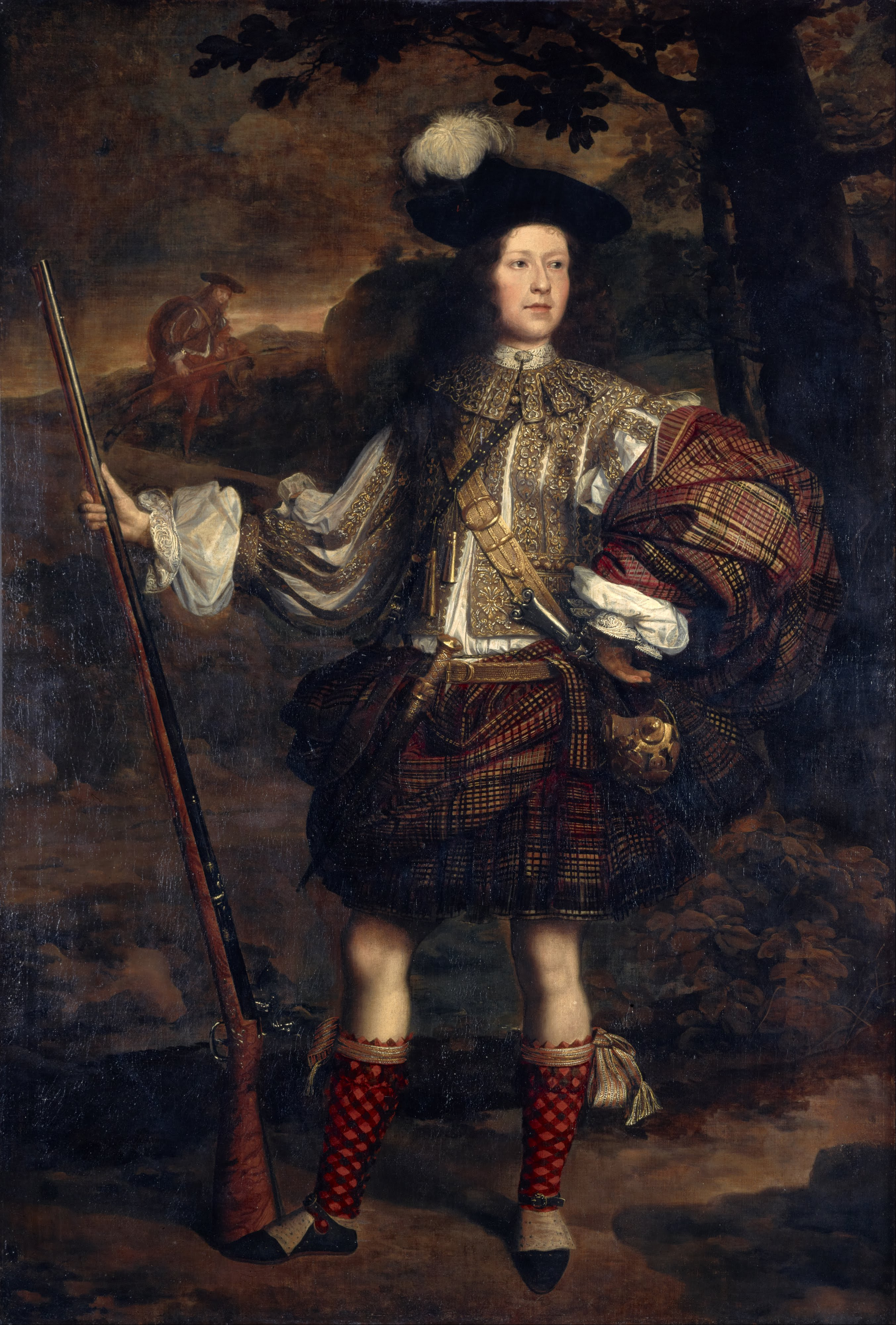
Lord Mungo Murray, the fifth son of the 1st Marquess of Atholl, depicted in Highland dress around 1680

Unlike in England, where kinship was predominately cognatic (derived through both males and females), in Scotland kinship was agnatic, with members of a group sharing a (sometimes fictional) common ancestor. Women retained their original surname at marriage and marriages were intended to create friendship between kin groups, rather than a new bond of kinship. In the Borders this was often reflected in a common surname. A shared surname has been seen as a "test of kinship", proving large bodies of kin who could call on each other's support. At the beginning of the period this could help intensify the idea of the feud, which was usually carried out as a form of revenge for a kinsman and for which a large bodies of kin could be counted on to support rival sides, although conflict between members of kin groups also occurred. From the reign of James VI systems of judicial law were enforced and by the early eighteenth century the feud had been suppressed. In the Borders the leadership of the heads of the great surnames was largely replaced by the authority of landholding lairds in the seventeenth century.

The combination of agnatic kinship and a feudal system of obligation has been seen as creating the Highland clan system. The head of a clan was usually the eldest son of the last chief of the most powerful sept or branch. The leading families of a clan formed the fine, often seen as equivalent to lowland lairds, providing council in peace and leadership in war, and below them were the daoine usisle (in Gaelic) or tacksmen (in Scots), who managed the clan lands and collected the rents. In the isles and along the adjacent western seaboard there were also buannachann, who acted as a military elite, defending the clan lands from raids or taking part in attacks on clan enemies. Most of the followers of the clan were tenants, who supplied labour to the clan heads and sometimes acted as soldiers. In the early modern period they usually took the clan name as their surname, turning it into a massive, if often fictive, kin group. Because the Highland Clans were not a direct threat to the Restoration government, or relations with England, the same effort was not put into suppressing their independence as had been focused on the Borders, until after the Glorious Revolution. Economic change and the imposition of royal justice had begun to undermine the clan system before the eighteenth century, but the process was accelerated after the Jacobite rising of 1745, with Highland dress banned, the enforced disarming of clansmen, the compulsory purchase of heritable jurisdictions, the exile of many chiefs and sending of ordinary clansmen to the colonies as indentured labour. All of this largely reducing clan leaders to the status of simple landholders within a generation.

=== Demography ===
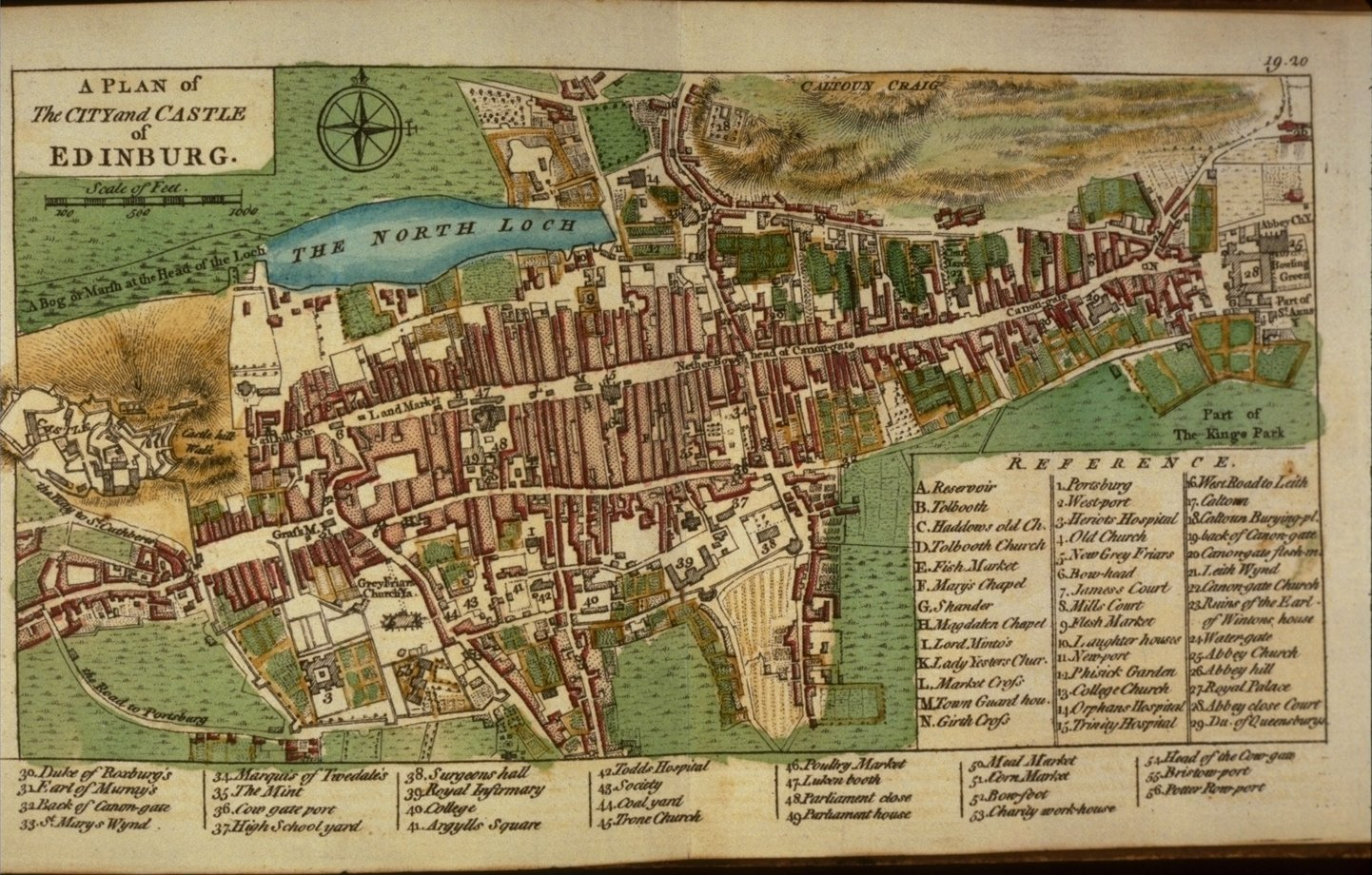
Plan of Edinburgh in 1764, the largest city in Scotland in the early modern period.

There are almost no reliable sources with which to track the population of Scotland before the late seventeenth century. Estimates based on English records suggest that by the end of the Middle Ages, the Black Death and subsequent recurring outbreaks of the plague, may have caused the population of Scotland to fall as low as half a million people. Price inflation, which generally reflects growing demand for food, suggests that this probably expanded in the first half of the sixteenth century, levelling off after the famine of 1595, as prices were relatively stable in the early seventeenth century. Calculations based on Hearth Tax returns for 1691 indicate a population of 1,234,575. This level may have been seriously effected by the famines of the 1690s. The first reliable information available on national population is from the census conducted by the Reverend Alexander Webster in 1755, which showed the inhabitants of Scotland as 1,265,380 persons.

Compared with the situation after the redistribution of population in the later clearances and the Industrial Revolution, these numbers would have been evenly spread over the kingdom, with roughly half living north of the Tay. Perhaps ten per cent of the population lived in one of many burghs that grew up in the later medieval period, mainly in the east and south. It has been suggested that they would have had a mean population of about 2,000, but many would be much smaller than 1,000 and the largest, Edinburgh, probably had a population of over 10,000 at the beginning of the modern era and by 1750, with its suburbs it had reached 57,000. The only other towns above 10,000 by the end of the period were Glasgow with 32,000, Aberdeen with around 16,000 and Dundee with 12,000.

=== Witchtrials ===
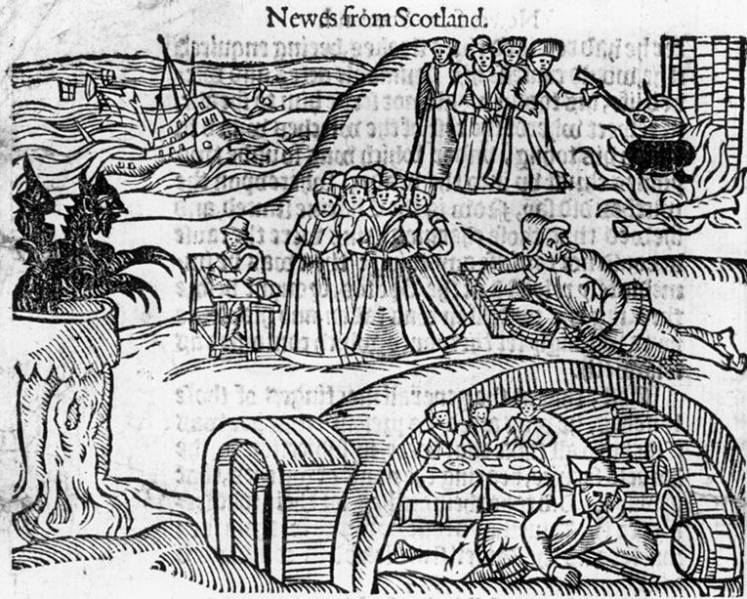
The North Berwick Witches meet the Devil in the local kirkyard, from a contemporary pamphlet, Newes from Scotland.

In late medieval Scotland there is evidence of occasional prosecutions of individuals for causing harm through witchcraft, but these may have been declining in the first half of the sixteenth century. In the aftermath of the initial Reformation settlement, Parliament passed the Witchcraft Act 1563, similar to that passed in England one year earlier, which made witchcraft a capital crime. Despite the fact that Scotland probably had about one quarter of the population of England, it would have three times the number of witchcraft prosecutions, at about 6,000 for the entire period. James VI's visit to Denmark, a country familiar with witch hunts, may have encouraged an interest in the study of witchcraft. After his return to Scotland, he attended the North Berwick witch trials, the first major persecution of witches in Scotland under the 1563 Act. Several people, most notably Agnes Sampson, were convicted of using witchcraft to send storms against James' ship. James became obsessed with the threat posed by witches and, inspired by his personal involvement, in 1597 wrote the Daemonologie, a tract that opposed the practice of witchcraft and which provided background material for Shakespeare's Tragedy of Macbeth. James is known to have personally supervised the torture of women accused of being witches. After 1599, his views became more sceptical.

In the seventeenth century, the pursuit of witchcraft was largely taken over by the kirk sessions and was often used to attach superstitious and Catholic practices in Scottish society. Most of the accused, 75 per cent, were women, with over 1,500 executed, and the witch hunt in Scotland has been seen as a means of controlling women. The most intense witch hunt was in 1661–62, which involved 664 named witches in four counties. From this point prosecutions began to decline as trials were more tightly controlled by the judiciary and government, torture was more sparingly used and standards of evidence were raised. There may also have been a growing scepticism and with relative peace and stability the economic and social tensions that contributed to accusations may have reduced. There were occasional local outbreaks like that in East Lothian in 1678 and 1697 at Paisley. The last recorded executions were in 1706 and the last trial in 1727. The British parliament repealed the 1563 Act in 1736.

=== Poverty and vagrancy ===
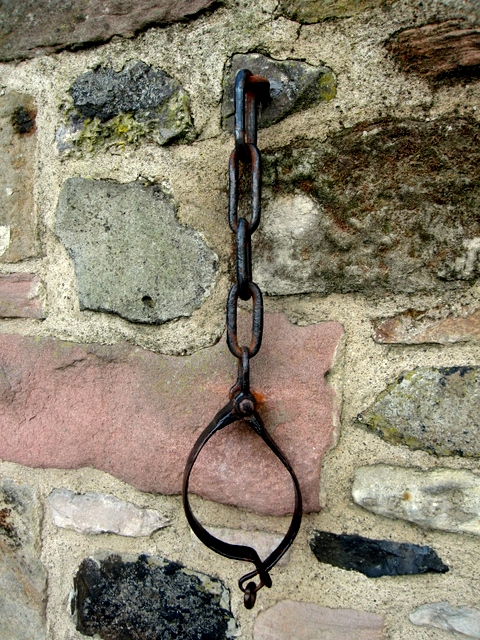
The jougs at Duddingston Parish Church, ordered to be established for beggars and other offenders from 1593

Population growth and economic dislocation from the second half of the sixteenth century led to a growing problem of vagrancy. The government reacted with three major pieces of legislation in 1574, 1579 and 1592. The kirk became a major element of the system of poor relief and justices of the peace were given responsibility for dealing with the issue. The 1574 act was modelled on the English act passed two years earlier and limited relief to the deserving poor of the old, sick and infirm, imposing draconian punishments on a long list of "masterful beggars", including jugglers, palmisters and unlicensed tutors. Parish deacons, elders or other overseers were to draw up lists of deserving poor and each would be assessed. Those not belonging to the parish were to be sent back to their place of birth and might be put in the stocks or otherwise punished, probably actually increasing the level of vagrancy. Unlike the English act, there was no attempt to provide work for the able-bodied poor. In practice, the strictures on begging were often disregarded in times of extreme hardship.

This legislation provided the basis of what would later be known as the "Old Poor Law" in Scotland, which remained in place until the mid-nineteenth century. Most subsequent legislation built on the principles of provision for the local deserving poor and punishment of mobile and undeserving "sturdie beggars". The most important later act was that of 1649, which declared that local heritors were to be assessed by kirk session to provide the financial resources for local relief, rather than relying on voluntary contributions. The system was largely able to cope with the general level of poverty and minor crises, helping the old and infirm to survive and provide life support in periods of downturn at relatively low cost, but was overwhelmed in the major subsistence crisis of the 1690s.

== Government ==
=== The crown ===
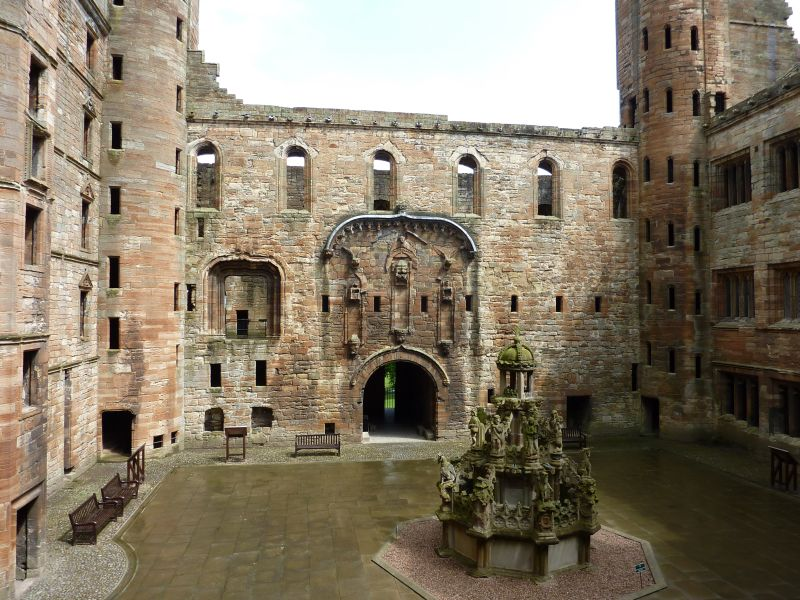
Linlithgow Palace re-built for James V to suggest an open-air Renaissance courtyard

For the early part of the era, the authority of the crown was limited by the large number of minorities it had seen since the early fifteenth century. This tended to decrease the level of royal revenues, as regents often alienated land and revenues. Regular taxation was adopted from 1581 and afterwards was called on with increasing frequency and scale until in 1612 a demand of £240,000 resulted in serious opposition. A new tax on annual rents amounting to five per cent on all interest on loans, mainly directed at the merchants of the burghs, was introduced in 1621; but it was widely resented and was still being collected over a decade later. Under Charles I the annual income from all sources in Scotland was under £16,000 sterling and inadequate for the normal costs of government, with the court in London now being financed out of English revenues. The sum of £10,000 a month from the county assessment was demanded by the Cromwellian regime, which Scotland failed to fully supply, but it did contribute £35,000 in excise a year. Although Parliament made a formal grant of £40,000 a year to Charles II, the rising costs civilian government and war meant that this was inadequate to support Scottish government. Under William I and after the Union, engagement in continental and colonial wars led to heavier existing taxes and new taxes, including the Poll and Hearth Taxes.

In the sixteenth century, the court was central to the patronage and dissemination of Renaissance works and ideas. Lavish court display was often tied up with ideas of chivalry, which was evolving in this period from into an ornamental and honorific cult. Tournaments provided one focus of display and were also pursued enthusiastically by James V, proud of his membership of international orders of knighthood. During her brief personal rule, Mary, Queen of Scots brought many of the elaborate court activities that she had grown up with at the French court, with balls, masques and celebrations, designed to illustrate the resurgence of the monarchy and to facilitate national unity. Under James VI, the court returned to being a centre of culture and learning and he cultivated the image of a philosopher king.

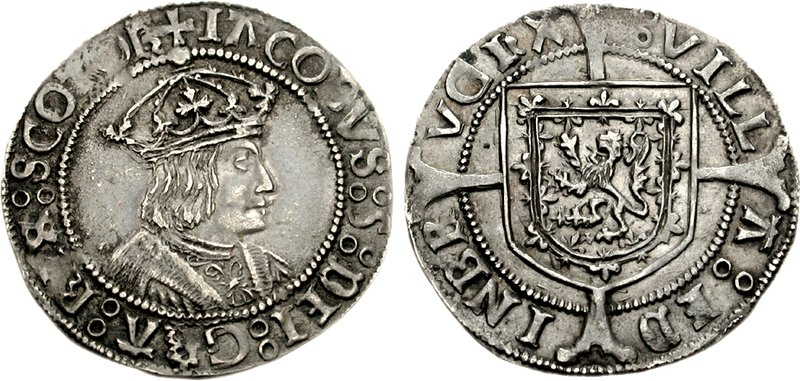
Groat of James V, showing him wearing an imperial closed crown

James V was the first Scottish monarch to wear the closed imperial crown, in place of the open circlet of medieval kings, suggesting a claim to absolute authority within the kingdom. His diadem was reworked to include arches in 1532, which were re-added when it was reconstructed in 1540 in what remains the Crown of Scotland. The idea of imperial monarchy emphasised the dignity of the crown and included its role as a unifying national force, defending national borders and interest, royal supremacy over the law and a distinctive national church within the Catholic communion. New Monarchy can also be seen in the reliance of the crown on "new men" rather than the great magnates, the use of the clergy as a form of civil service, developing standing armed forces and a navy. Major intellectual figures in the Reformation included George Buchanan, whose works De Jure Regni apud Scotos (1579) and Rerum Scoticarum Historia (1582) were among the major texts outlining the case for resistance to tyrants. Buchanan was one of the young James VI's tutors, but they failed to intellectually convince him of their ideas about limited monarchy. James asserted the concept of "divine right", by which a king was appointed by God and thus gained a degree of sanctity. These ideas he passed on to Charles I, whose ability to compromise may have been undermined by them, helping to lead to his political difficulties. When he was executed, the Scottish Covenanters objected, but avoided advancing the sanctity of kings as a reason. In 1689, when the Scottish Estates had to find a justification for deposing James VII, they turned to Buchanan's argument on the contractual nature of monarchy in the Claim of Right.

=== Privy council ===
Until 1707, The Privy Council met in what is now the West Drawing Room at the Palace of Holyroodhouse in Edinburgh. By the early modern period the Privy Council was a full-time body and critical to the smooth running of government. Its primary function was judicial, but it also acted as a body of advisers to the king and as a result its secondary function was as an executive in the absence or minority of the monarchy. After James VI departure to England in 1603, it functioned as a subservient executive carrying out his instructions from London. Although the theoretical membership of the council was relatively large, at around thirty persons, most of the business was carried out by an informal inner group consisting mainly of the officers of state. After the Restoration, Charles II nominated his own privy councillors and set up a council in London through which he directed affairs in Edinburgh, a situation that continued after the Glorious Revolution of 1688–89. The council was abolished after the Act of Union on 1 May 1708.

=== Parliament ===
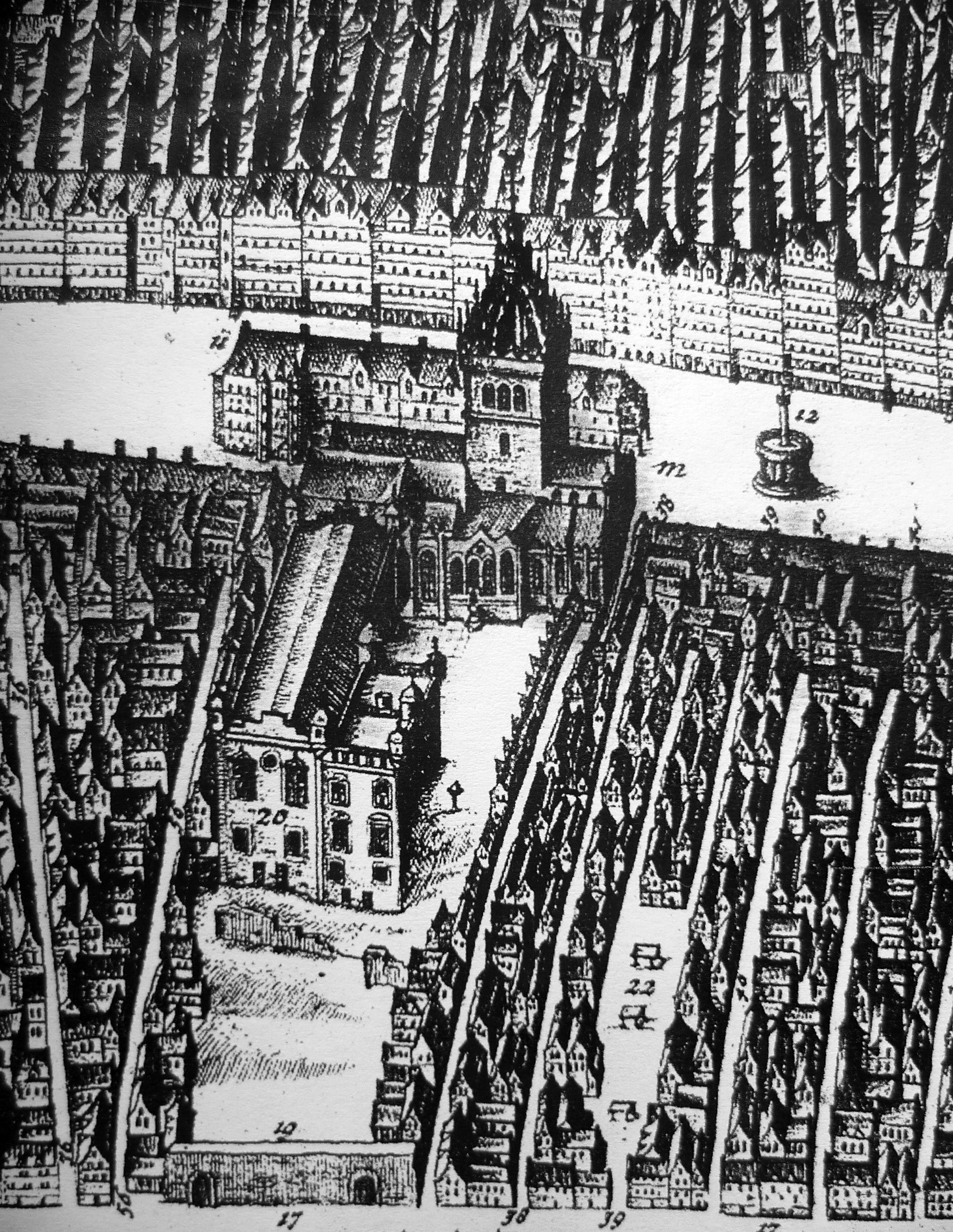
Parliament House, built by Charles I to house the Parliament of Scotland, pictured c. 1647.

In the sixteenth century, parliament usually met in Stirling Castle or the Old Tolbooth, Edinburgh, which was rebuilt on the orders of Mary Queen of Scots from 1561. Charles I ordered the construction of Parliament Hall, which was built between 1633 and 1639 and remained the parliament's home until it was dissolved in 1707. By the end of the Middle Ages the Parliament had evolved from the King's Council of Bishops and Earls into a 'colloquium' with a political and judicial role. The attendance of knights and freeholders had become important, and burgh commissioners joined them to form the Three Estates. It acquired significant powers over taxation, but it also had a strong influence over justice, foreign policy, war, and other legislation. Much of the legislative business of the Scottish parliament was carried out by a parliamentary committee known as the 'Lords of the Articles', which drafted legislation which was then presented to the full assembly to be confirmed. Like many continental assemblies the Scottish Parliament was being called less frequently by the early sixteenth century and might have been dispensed with by the crown had it not been for the series of minorities and regencies that dominated from 1513.

Parliament played a major part in the Reformation crisis of the mid-sixteenth century. It had been used by James V to uphold Catholic orthodoxy and asserted its right to determine the nature of religion in the country, disregarding royal authority in 1560. The 1560 parliament included 100, predominately Protestant, lairds, who claimed a right to sit in the Parliament under the provision of a failed shire election act of 1428. Their position in the parliament remained uncertain and their presence fluctuated until the 1428 act was revived in 1587 and provision made for the annual election of two commissioners from each shire (except Kinross and Clackmannan, which had one each). The property qualification for voters was for freeholders who held land from the crown of the value of 40s of auld extent. This excluded the growing class of feuars, who would not gain these rights until 1661. The clerical estate was marginalised in Parliament by the Reformation, with the laymen who had acquired the monasteries and sitting as 'abbots' and 'priors'. Catholic clergy were excluded after 1567, but a small number of Protestant bishops continued as the clerical estate. James VI attempted to revive the role of the bishops from about 1600. They were abolished by the Covenanters in 1638, when Parliament became an entirely lay assembly. A further group appeared in the Parliament from the minority of James IV in the 1560s, with members of the Privy Council representing the king's interests, until they were excluded in 1641. James VI continued to manage parliament though the Lords of the Articles, filling it with royal officers as non-elected members, but was forced to limit this to eight from 1617.

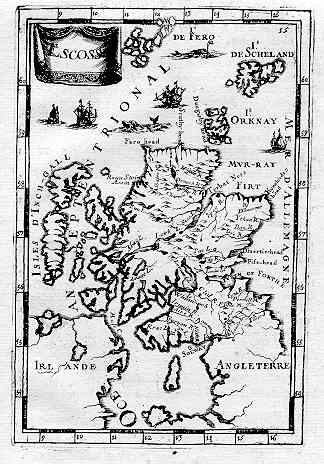
Seventeenth-century map of Scotland

Having been officially suspended at the end of the Cromwellian regime, parliament returned after the Restoration of Charles II in 1661. This parliament, later known disparagingly as the 'Drunken Parliament', revoked most of the Presbyterian gains of the last thirty years. Subsequently, Charles' absence from Scotland and use of commissioners to rule his northern kingdom undermined the authority of the body. James' parliament supported him against rivals and attempted rebellions, but after his escape to exile in 1689, William's first parliament was dominated by his supporters and, in contrast to the situation in England, effectively deposed James under the Claim of Right, which offered the crown to William and Mary, placing important limitations on royal power, including the abolition of the Lords of the Articles. The new Williamite parliament would subsequently bring about its own demise by the Act of Union in 1707.

=== Local government ===
From the sixteenth century, the central government became increasingly involved in local affairs. The feud was limited and regulated, local taxation became much more intrusive and from 1607 regular, local commissions of Justices of the Peace on the English model were established to deal with petty crimes and infractions. Greater control was exerted over the lawless Borders through a joint commission with the English set up in 1587. James VI was much more hostile to the culture and particularism of the Highlands than his predecessors. He sent colonists from Fife to parts of the region and forced the Highland chiefs to accept Lowland language and culture through the Statues of Iona 1609. From the seventeenth century the function of shires expanded from judicial functions into wider local administration. In 1667 Commissioners of Supply were appointed in each sheriffdom or shire to collect the cess land tax. The parish also became an important unit of local government, pressured by Justices in the early eighteenth century, it became responsible for taking care of the destitute in periods of famine, like that in 1740, to prevent the impoverished from taking to the roads and causing general disorder. Behaviour could be regulated through kirk sessions, composed of local church elders, which replaced the church courts of the Middle Ages, and which dealt with moral and religious conduct. The local court baron remained important in regulating minor interpersonal and property offences. They were held at the behest of the local baron when there was a backlog of cases and could appoint birleymen, usually senior tenants, who would resolve disputes and issues. The combination of kirk sessions and courts baron gave considerable power to local lairds to control the behaviour of the populations of their communities.

=== Law ===
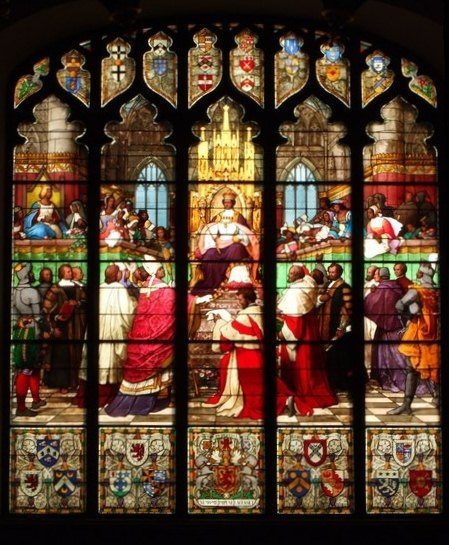
Institution of the Court of Session by James V in 1532, from the Great Window in Parliament House, Edinburgh

In the late Middle Ages, justice in Scotland was a mixture of the royal and local, which was often unsystematic with overlapping jurisdictions, undertaken by clerical lawyers, laymen, amateurs and local leaders. Under James IV the legal functions of the council were rationalised, with a royal Court of Session meeting daily in Edinburgh to deal with civil cases. In 1514 the office of justice-general was created for the earl of Argyll (and held by his family until 1628). The study of law was popular in Scotland from the Middle Ages and many students travelled to Continental Europe to study canon law and civil law. In 1532 the Royal College of Justice was founded, leading to the training and professionalisation of an emerging group of career lawyers. The Court of Session placed increasing emphasis on its independence from influence, including from the king, and superior jurisdiction over local justice. Its judges were increasingly able to control entry to their own ranks. In 1605 the professionalisation of the bench led to entry requirements in Latin, law and a property qualification of £2,000, designed to limit the danger of bribery, helping to create an exclusive, wealthy and powerful and professional caste, who also now dominated government posts in a way that the clergy had done in the Middle Ages. In 1672 the High Court of Justiciary was founded from the College of Justice as a supreme court of appeal. The Act of Union in 1707 largely persevered the distinct Scottish legal system and its courts, separate from English jurisdiction.

== Warfare ==
In the later Middle Ages, Scottish armies were assembled on the basis of common service, feudal obligations and money contracts of bonds of manrent. In 1513 these systems were successful in producing a large and formidable force, but there is evidence that by the mid-sixteenth century the authorities were experiencing increasing difficulty in recruitment. Individuals were expected to provide their own equipment. Heavy armour was abandoned after the Flodden campaign and noblemen became indistinguishable from the majority of troops. Highland lords tended to continue to use lighter chainmail and ordinary highlanders dressed in the plaid. Weapons included various forms of axes and pole arms. Highland troops brought bows and two-handed swords (claidheamh mór). The crown took an increasing role in the supply of equipment. The pike began to replace the spear or axe and the bow began to be replaced by gunpowder firearms. The feudal heavy cavalry had begun to disappear from Scottish armies and the Scots fielded relatively large numbers of light horse, often drawn from the borders. James IV brought in experts from France, Germany and the Netherlands and established a gun foundry in 1511. Gunpowder weaponry fundamentally altered the nature of castle architecture from the mid-fifteenth century. In the period of French intervention in the 1540s and 1550s, Scotland was given a defended border of a series of earthwork forts and additions to existing castles.

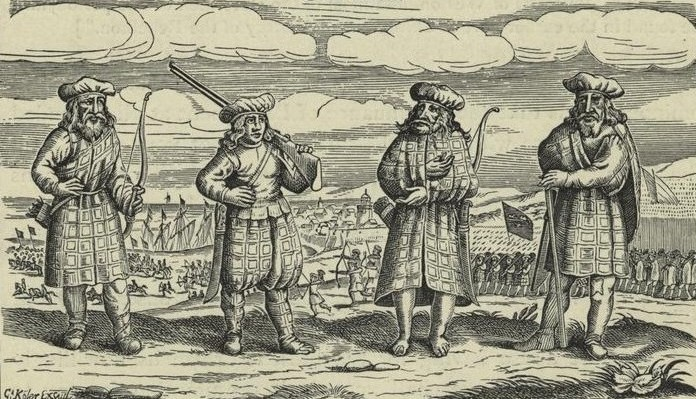
The earliest image of Scottish soldiers wearing tartan, from a woodcut c. 1631

There were various attempts to create royal naval forces in the fifteenth century. James IV put the enterprise on a new footing, founding a harbour at Newhaven and a dockyard at the Pools of Airth. He acquired a total of 38 ships including the Great Michael, at that time, the largest ship in Europe. Scottish ships had some success against privateers, accompanied the king on his expeditions in the islands and intervened in conflicts Scandinavia and the Baltic, but were sold after the Flodden campaign. From 1516 Scottish naval efforts would rely on privateering captains and hired merchantmen. James V did not share his father's interest in developing a navy and shipbuilding fell behind the Low Countries. Despite truces between England and Scotland there were periodic outbreaks of a guerre de course. James V built a new harbour at Burntisland in 1542. The chief use of naval power in his reign were a series of expeditions to the Isles and France. After the Union of Crowns in 1603 conflict between Scotland and England ended, but Scotland found itself involved in England's foreign policy, opening up Scottish shipping to attack. In 1626 a squadron of three ships were bought and equipped. There were also several marque fleets of privateers. In 1627, the Royal Scots Navy and accompanying contingents of burgh privateers participated in the major expedition to Biscay. The Scots also returned to West Indies and in 1629 took part in the capture of Quebec.

In the early seventeenth century relatively large numbers of Scots took service in foreign armies involved in the Thirty Years' War. As armed conflict with Charles I in the Bishops' Wars became likely, hundreds of Scots mercenaries returned home from foreign service, including experienced leaders like Alexander and David Leslie and these veterans played an important role in training recruits. These systems would form the basis of the Covenanter armies that intervened in the Civil Wars in England and Ireland. Scottish infantry were generally armed, as was almost universal in Western Europe, with a combination of pike and shot. Scottish armies may also have had individuals with a variety of weapons including bows, Lochaber axes, and halberds. Most cavalry were probably equipped with pistols and swords, although there is some evidence that they included lancers. Royalist armies, like those led by James Graham, Marquis of Montrose (1643–44) and in Glencairn's rising (1653–54) were mainly composed of conventionally armed infantry with pike and shot. Montrose's forces were short of heavy artillery suitable for siege warfare and had only a small force of cavalry. During the Bishops' Wars the king attempted to blockade Scotland and planned amphibious assaults from England on the East coast and from Ireland to the West. Scottish privateers took a number of English prizes. After the Covenanters allied with the English Parliament they established two patrol squadrons for the Atlantic and North Sea coasts, known collectively as the "Scotch Guard". The Scottish navy was unable to withstand the English fleet that accompanied the army led by Cromwell that conquered Scotland in 1649–51 and the Scottish ships and crews were split up among the Commonwealth fleet. During the English occupation of Scotland under the Commonwealth, several more fortresses in the style of the trace italienne were built, as at Ayr, Inverness and Leith.

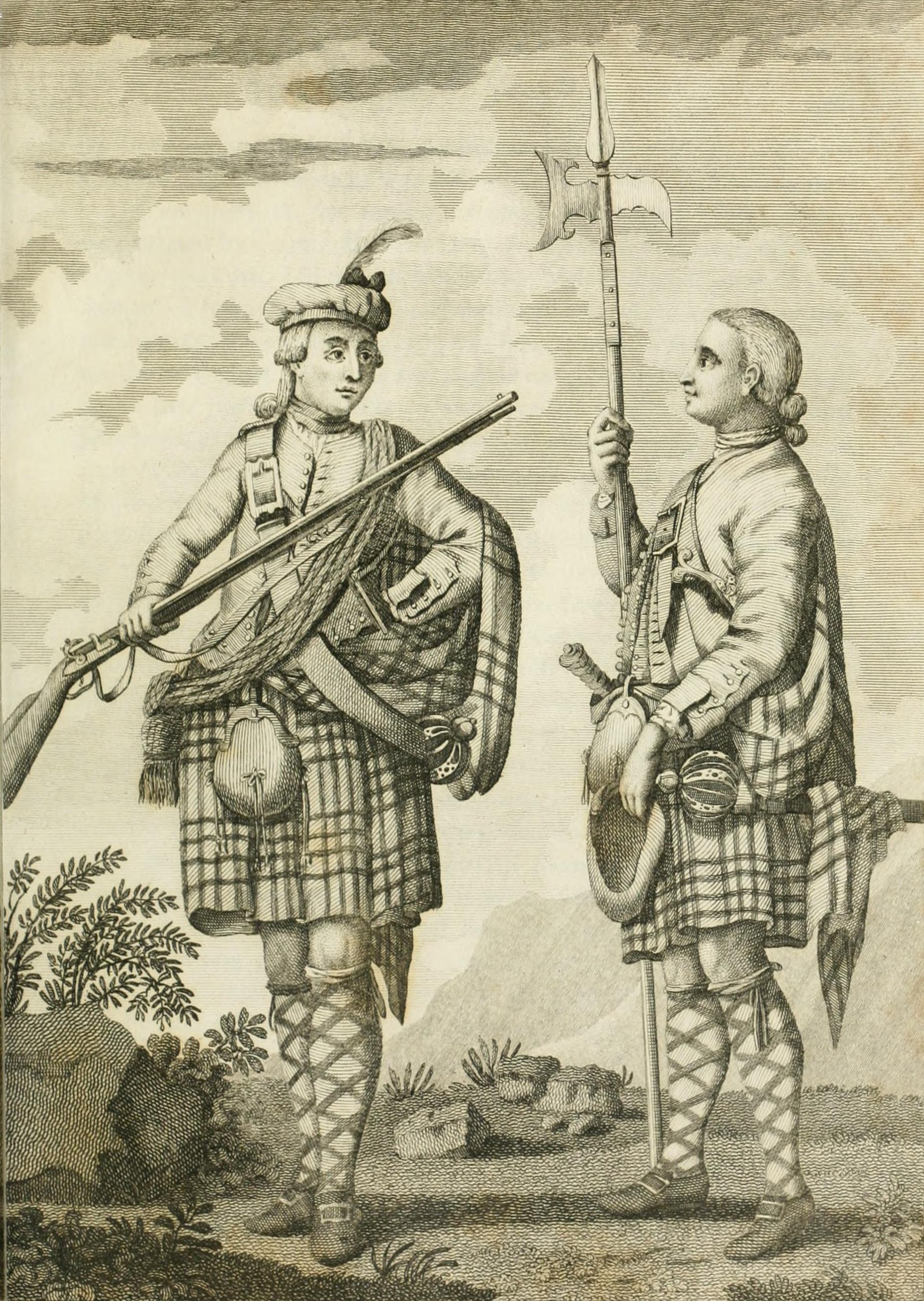
A private and corporal of a Highland regiment, c. 1740

At the Restoration the Privy Council established a force of several infantry regiments and a few troops of horse and there were attempts to found a national militia on the English model. The standing army was mainly employed in the suppression of Covenanter rebellions and the guerrilla war undertaken by the Cameronians in the East. Pikemen became less important in the late seventeenth century and after the introduction of the socket bayonet disappeared altogether, while matchlock muskets were replaced by the more reliable flintlock. On the eve of the Glorious Revolution the standing army in Scotland was about 3,000 men in various regiments and another 268 veterans in the major garrison towns. After the Glorious Revolution the Scots were drawn into King William II's continental wars, beginning with the Nine Years' War in Flanders (1689–97). Scottish seamen received protection against arbitrary impressment by English men of war, but a fixed quota of conscripts for the Royal Navy was levied from the sea-coast burghs during the second half of the seventeenth century. Royal Navy patrols were now found in Scottish waters even in peacetime. In the Second (1665–67) and Third Anglo-Dutch Wars (1672–74) between 80 and 120 captains, took Scottish letters of marque and privateers played a major part in the naval conflict. In the 1690s a small fleet of five ships was established by merchants for the Darien Scheme, and a professional navy was established for the protection of commerce in home waters during the Nine Years' War, with three purpose-built warships bought from English shipbuilders in 1696. After the Act of Union in 1707, these vessels were transferred to the Royal Navy. By the time of the Act of Union, the Kingdom of Scotland had a standing army of seven units of infantry, two of horse and one troop of Horse Guards, besides varying levels of fortress artillery in the garrison castles of Edinburgh, Dumbarton, and Stirling. As part of the British Army, Scottish regiments took part in the War of the Spanish Succession (1702–13), the Quadruple Alliance (1718–20), wars with Spain (1727–29) and (1738–48) and the War of the Austrian Succession (1740–48). The first official Highland regiment to be raised for the British army was the Black Watch in 1740, but the growth of Highland regiments was delayed by the 1745 Jacobite rising. The bulk of Jacobite armies were made up of Highlanders, serving in clan regiments. The clan gentlemen formed the front ranks of the unit and were more heavily armed than their impoverished tenants who made up the bulk of the regiment. Because they served in the front ranks, the gentlemen suffered higher proportional casualties than the common clansman. The Jacobites often started campaigns poorly armed, but arms tended to become more conventional as the campaigns progressed.

== Culture ==
=== Education ===
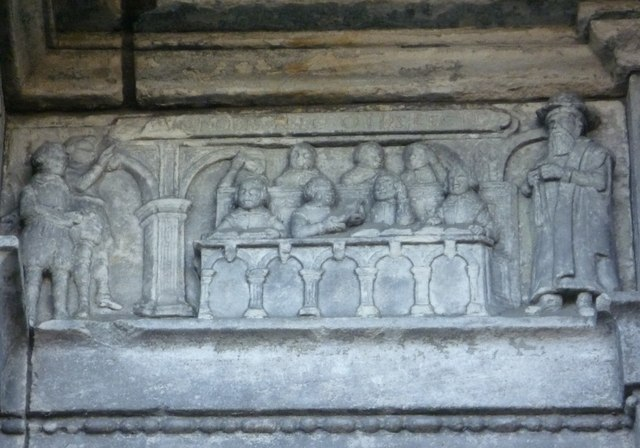
Carving of a seventeenth-century classroom with a dominie and scholars from George Heriot's School, Edinburgh

Protestant reformers shared the humanist concern with widening education, with a desire for a godly people replacing the aim of having educated citizens. In 1560 the First Book of Discipline set out a plan for a school in every parish, but this proved financially impossible. In the burghs the old schools were maintained, with the song schools and a number of new foundations becoming reformed grammar schools or ordinary parish schools. Schools were supported by a combination of kirk funds, contributions from local heritors or burgh councils and parents that could pay. They were inspected by kirk sessions, who checked for the quality of teaching and doctrinal purity. There were also large number of unregulated "adventure schools", which sometimes fulfilled local needs and sometimes took pupils away from the official schools. Outside of the established burgh schools masters often combined their position with other employment, particularly minor posts within the kirk, such as clerk. At their best, the curriculum included catechism, Latin, French, Classical literature and sports.

In 1616 an act in Privy council commanded every parish to establish a school "where convenient means may be had", and when the Parliament of Scotland ratified this with the Education Act 1633, a tax on local landowners was introduced to provide the necessary endowments. A loophole that allowed evasion of this tax was closed in the Education Act 1646, which established a solid institutional foundation for schools on Covenanter principles. Although the Restoration brought a reversion to the 1633 position, in 1696 new legislation restored the provisions of 1646, together with means of enforcement "more suitable to the age". It took until the late seventeenth century to produce a largely complete network of parish schools in the Lowlands, and in the Highlands basic education was still lacking in many areas by the passing of the Education Act 1696, which would be the basis of administration of the system until 1873. In rural communities this act obliged local heritors to provide a schoolhouse and pay a schoolmaster, while ministers and local presbyteries oversaw the quality of the education. In many Scottish towns, burgh schools were operated by local councils. In the Highlands, as well as problems of distance and physical isolation, most people spoke Gaelic which few teachers and ministers could understand. Here the Kirk's parish schools were supplemented by the Society in Scotland for Propagating Christian Knowledge, established in 1709. Its aim was to teach the English language and to end the Roman Catholicism associated with rebellious Jacobitism. Although the Gaelic Society schools eventually taught the Bible in Gaelic, the overall effect was a contribution to the erosion of Highland culture.

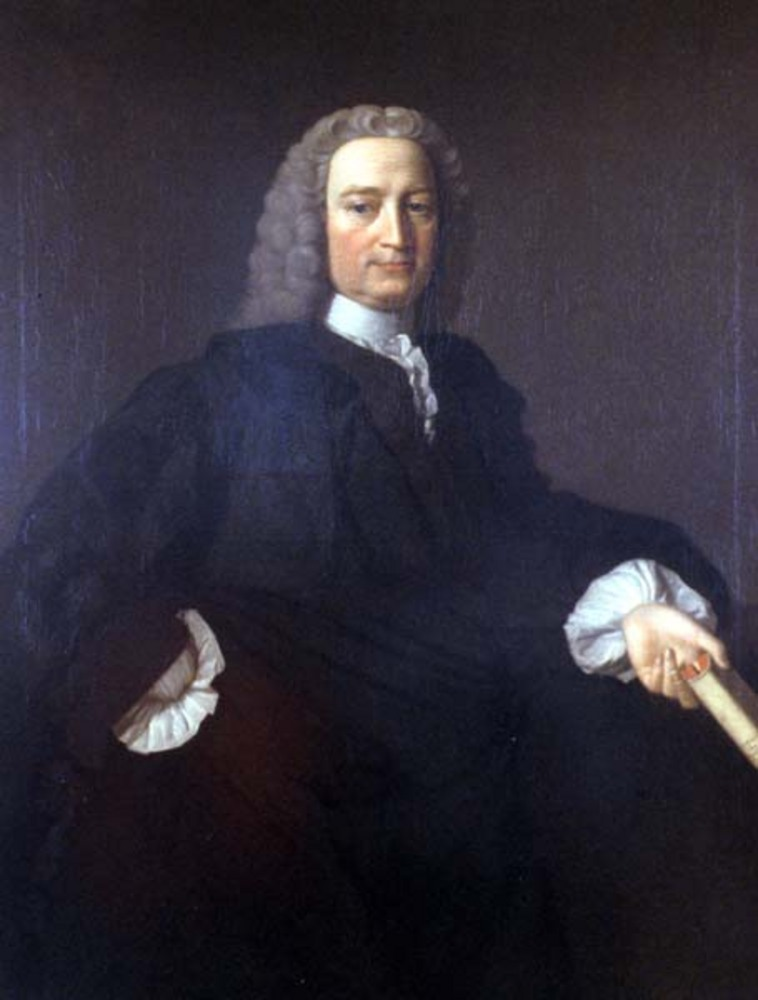
Francis Hutcheson (1694–1746), one of the founding fathers of the Scottish Enlightenment

After the Reformation, Scotland's universities underwent a series of reforms associated with Andrew Melville, who returned from Geneva to become principal of the University of Glasgow in 1574. A distinguished linguist, philosopher and poet, he had trained in Paris and studied law at Poitiers, before moving to Geneva and developing an interest in Protestant theology. Influenced by the anti-Aristotelian Petrus Ramus, he placed an emphasis on simplified logic and elevated languages and sciences to the same status as philosophy, allowing accepted ideas in all areas to be challenged. He introduced new specialist teaching staff, replacing the system of "regenting", where one tutor took the students through the entire arts curriculum. Metaphysics were abandoned and Greek became compulsory in the first year followed by Aramaic, Syriac and Hebrew, launching a new fashion for ancient and biblical languages. Glasgow had probably been declining as a university before his arrival, but students now began to arrive in large numbers. He assisted in the reconstruction of Marischal College, Aberdeen, and to do for St Andrews what he had done for Glasgow, he was appointed Principal of St Mary's College, St Andrews, in 1580. The results were a revitalisation of all Scottish universities, which were now producing a quality of education the equal of that offered anywhere in Europe.

After the religious and political upheavals of the seventeenth century, the universities recovered with a lecture-based curriculum that embraced economics and science, offering a high quality liberal education to the sons of the nobility and gentry. It helped them to become major centres of medical education and to put Scotland at the forefront of Enlightenment thinking. Key figures in the Scottish Enlightenment who had made their mark before the mid-eighteenth century included Francis Hutcheson (1694–1746), who was professor of moral philosophy at Glasgow. He was an important link between the ideas of Shaftesbury and the later school of Scottish Common Sense Realism. Colin Maclaurin (1698–1746) was chair of mathematics by the age of 19 at Marischal College, University of Aberdeen and the leading British mathematician of his era. Perhaps the most significant intellectual figure of this era in Scotland was David Hume (1711–76) whose Treatise on Human Nature (1738) and Essays, Moral and Political (1741) helped outline the parameters of philosophical empiricism and scepticism. and he would be a major influence of later Enlightenment figures including Adam Smith, Immanuel Kant and Jeremy Bentham.

=== Language ===
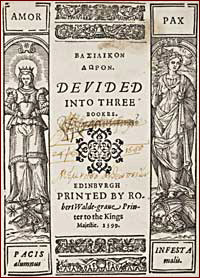
James VI's Basilikon Doron, was hurriedly translated into English from Scots at his accession to the English throne, marking the beginnings of an emphasis on Southern English as a language.

By the early modern period Gaelic had been in geographical decline for three centuries and had begun to be a second class language, confined to the Highlands and Islands. It was gradually being replaced by Middle Scots, which became the language of both the nobility and the majority population. It was derived substantially from Old English, with Gaelic and French influences. It was called Inglyshe and was very close to the language spoken in northern England, but by the sixteenth century it had established orthographic and literary norms largely independent of those developing in England. From the mid sixteenth century, written Scots was increasingly influenced by the developing Standard English of Southern England due to developments in royal and political interactions with England. With the increasing influence and availability of books printed in England, most writing in Scotland came to be done in the English fashion. Unlike many of his predecessors, James VI generally despised Gaelic culture. Having extolled the virtues of Scots "poesie", after his accession to the English throne, he increasingly favoured the language of southern England. In 1611 the Kirk adopted the Authorized King James Version of the Bible. In 1617 interpreters were declared no longer necessary in the port of London because Scots and Englishmen were now "not so far different bot ane understandeth ane uther". Jenny Wormald, describes James as creating a "three-tier system, with Gaelic at the bottom and English at the top".

After the Union in 1707 and the shift of political power to England, the use of Scots was discouraged by many in authority and education, as was the notion of Scottishness itself. Many leading Scots of the period, such as David Hume, considered themselves Northern British rather than Scottish. They attempted to rid themselves of their Scots in a bid to establish standard English as the official language of the newly formed Union. Many well-off Scots took to learning English through the activities of those such as Thomas Sheridan, who in 1761 gave a series of lectures on English elocution. Charging a guinea at a time (about £200 in today's money) they were attended by over 300 men, and he was made a freeman of the City of Edinburgh. Following this, some of the city's intellectuals formed the Select Society for Promoting the Reading and Speaking of the English Language in Scotland. Nevertheless, Scots remained the vernacular of many rural communities and the growing number of urban working-class Scots.

=== Literature ===
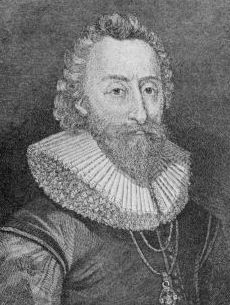
William Alexander, 1st Earl of Stirling

As a patron of poets and authors James V supported William Stewart and John Bellenden, who translated the Latin History of Scotland compiled in 1527 by Hector Boece, into verse and prose. Sir David Lindsay of the Mount the Lord Lyon, the head of the Lyon Court and diplomat, was a prolific poet. He produced an interlude at Linlithgow Palace thought to be a version of his play The Thrie Estaitis in 1540. James also attracted the attention of international authors. When he married Mary of Guise, Giovanni Ferrerio, an Italian scholar who had been at Kinloss Abbey in Scotland, dedicated to the couple a new edition of his work, On the true significance of comets against the vanity of astrologers. Like Henry VIII, James employed many foreign artisans and craftsmen to enhance the prestige of his renaissance Court.

In the 1580s and 1590s James VI promoted the literature of the country of his birth. His treatise, Some Rules and Cautions to be Observed and Eschewed in Scottish Prosody, published in 1584 when he was aged 18, was both a poetic manual and a description of the poetic tradition in his mother tongue, Scots, to which he applied Renaissance principles. He also made statutory provision to reform and promote the teaching of music, seeing the two in connection. He became patron and member of a loose circle of Scottish Jacobean court poets and musicians, the Castalian Band, which included among others William Fowler and Alexander Montgomerie, the latter being a favourite of the King. By the late 1590s his championing of his native Scottish tradition was diffused by the prospect of inheriting of the English throne, and some courtier poets who followed the king to London after 1603, such as William Alexander, began to anglicise their written language. James' took a greater interest in English Renaissance poetry and drama, which would reach a pinnacle of achievement in his reign, but his patronage for the high style in his own Scottish tradition largely became sidelined.

This was the period when the ballad emerged as a significant written form in Scotland. Some ballads may date back to the late medieval era and deal with events and people that can be traced back as far as the thirteenth century, including "Sir Patrick Spens" and "Thomas the Rhymer", but which are not known to have existed until the eighteenth century. They were probably composed and transmitted orally and only began to be written down and printed, often as broadsides and as part of chapbooks, later being recorded and noted in books by collectors including Robert Burns and Walter Scott. From the seventeenth century they were used as a literary form by aristocratic authors including Robert Sempill (c. 1595-c. 1665), Lady Elizabeth Wardlaw (1627–1727) and Lady Grizel Baillie (1645–1746). Allan Ramsay (1686–1758) laid the foundations of a reawakening of interest in older Scottish literature, as well as leading the trend for pastoral poetry, helping to develop the Habbie stanza as a poetic form.

=== Music ===
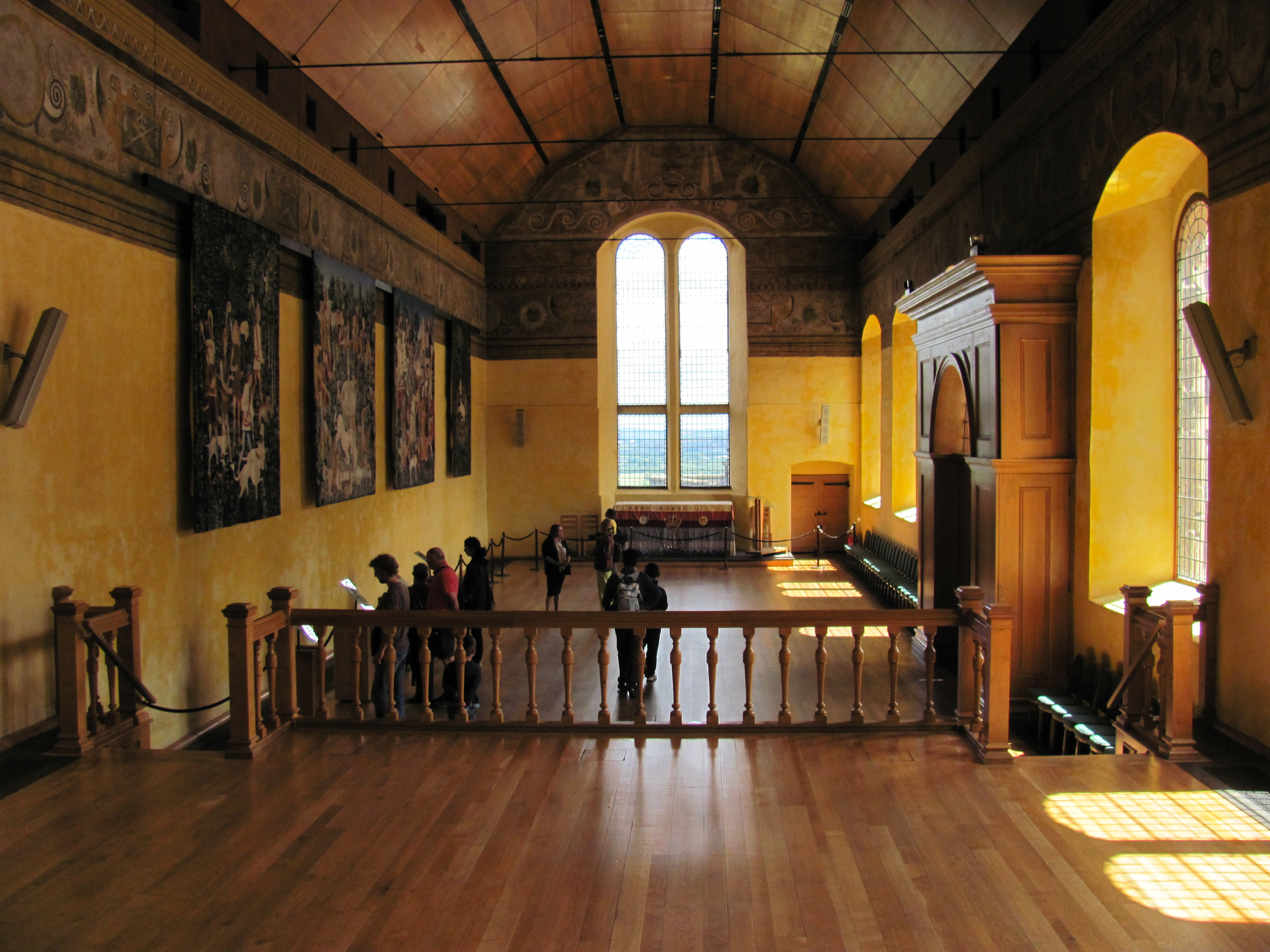
The interior of the Chapel Royal, Stirling Castle, a major focus for liturgical music

The outstanding Scottish composer of the first half of the sixteenth century was Robert Carver (c. 1488–1558), a canon of Scone Abbey. His complex polyphonic music could only have been performed by a large and highly trained choir such as the one employed in the Chapel Royal. James V was also a patron to figures including David Peebles (c. 1510–79?), whose best known work "Si quis diligit me" (text from John 14:23), is a motet for four voices. These were probably only two of many accomplished composers from this era, whose work has largely only survived in fragments. In this era Scotland followed the trend of Renaissance courts for instrumental accompaniment and playing. James V, as well as being a major patron of sacred music, was a talented lute player and introduced French chansons and consorts of viols to his court, although almost nothing of this secular chamber music survives.

The Reformation had a severe impact on church music. The song schools of the abbeys, cathedrals and collegiate churches were closed down, choirs disbanded, music books and manuscripts destroyed and organs removed from churches. The Lutheranism that influenced the early Scottish Reformation attempted to accommodate Catholic musical traditions into worship, drawing on Latin hymns and vernacular songs. The most important product of this tradition in Scotland was The Gude and Godlie Ballatis, which were spiritual satires on popular ballads composed by the brothers James, John and Robert Wedderburn. Never adopted by the kirk, they nevertheless remained popular and were reprinted from the 1540s to the 1620s. Later the Calvinism that came to dominate the Scottish Reformation was much more hostile to Catholic musical tradition and popular music, placing an emphasis on what was biblical, which meant the Psalms. The Scottish Psalter of 1564 was commissioned by the Assembly of the Church. It drew on the work of French musician Clément Marot, Calvin's contributions to the Strasbourg Psalter of 1529 and English writers, particularly the 1561 edition of the Psalter produced by William Whittingham for the English congregation in Geneva. The intention was to produce individual tunes for each psalm, but of 150 psalms, 105 had proper tunes and in the seventeenth century. Common tunes, which could be used for psalms with the same metre, became more frequent. The need for simplicity for whole congregations that would now all sing these psalms, unlike the trained choirs who had sung the many parts of polyphonic hymns, necessitated simplicity and most church compositions were confined to homophonic settings. There is evidence that polyphony survived and it was incorporated into editions of the Psalter from 1625, but usually with the congregation singing the melody and trained singers the contra-tenor, treble and bass parts.

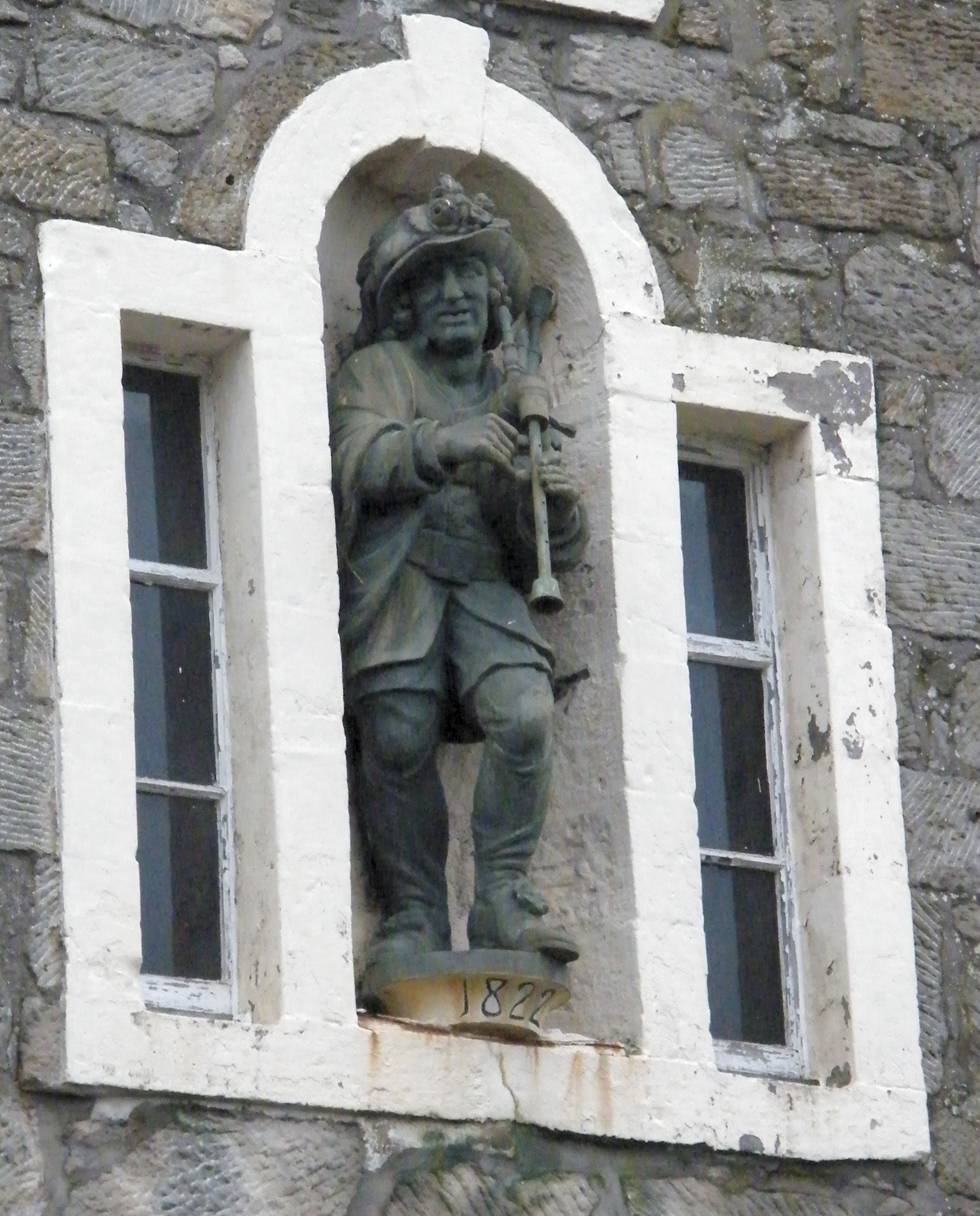
The statue of Habbie Simpson in Kilbarchan

The return of Mary from France in 1561 to begin her personal reign, and her position as a Catholic, gave a new lease of life to the choir of the Scottish Chapel Royal, but the destruction of Scottish church organs meant that instrumentation to accompany the mass had to employ bands of musicians with trumpets, drums, fifes, bagpipes and tabors. Like her father she played the lute, virginals and (unlike her father) was a fine singer. She brought French musical influences with her, employing lutenists and viol players in her household. James VI was a major patron of the arts in general. He made statutory provision to reform and promote the teaching of music, attempting to revive burgh song schools from 1579. He rebuilt the Chapel Royal at Stirling in 1594 and the choir was used for state occasions like the baptism of his son Henry. He followed the tradition of employing lutenists for his private entertainment, as did other members of his family. When he went south to take the throne of England in 1603 as James I, he removed one of the major sources of patronage in Scotland. The Scottish Chapel Royal was now used only for occasional state visits, beginning to fall into disrepair, and from now on the court in Westminster would be the only major source of royal musical patronage.

The secular popular tradition of music continued, despite attempts by the Kirk, particularly in the Lowlands, to suppress dancing and events like penny weddings at which tunes were played. Large numbers of musicians continued to perform, including the fiddler Pattie Birnie and the piper Habbie Simpson (1550–1620). In the Highlands the seventeenth century saw the development of piping families including the MacCrimmonds, MacArthurs, MacGregors and the Mackays of Gairlock. There is also evidence of adoption of the fiddle in the Highlands with Martin Martin noting in his A Description of the Western Isles of Scotland (1703) that he knew of eighteen in Lewis alone. The oppression of secular music and dancing began to ease between about 1715 and 1725 and the level of musical activity was reflected in a flood musical publications in broadsheets and compendiums of music such as the makar Allan Ramsay's verse compendium The Tea Table Miscellany (1723) and William Thomson's Orpheus Caledonius (1725). The Italian style of classical music was probably first brought to Scotland by the Italian cellist and composer Lorenzo Bocchi, who travelled to Scotland in the 1720s, introducing the cello to the country and then developing settings for lowland Scots songs. He possibly had a hand in the first Scottish Opera, the pastoral The Gentle Shepherd, with libretto by Allan Ramsay.

=== Architecture ===
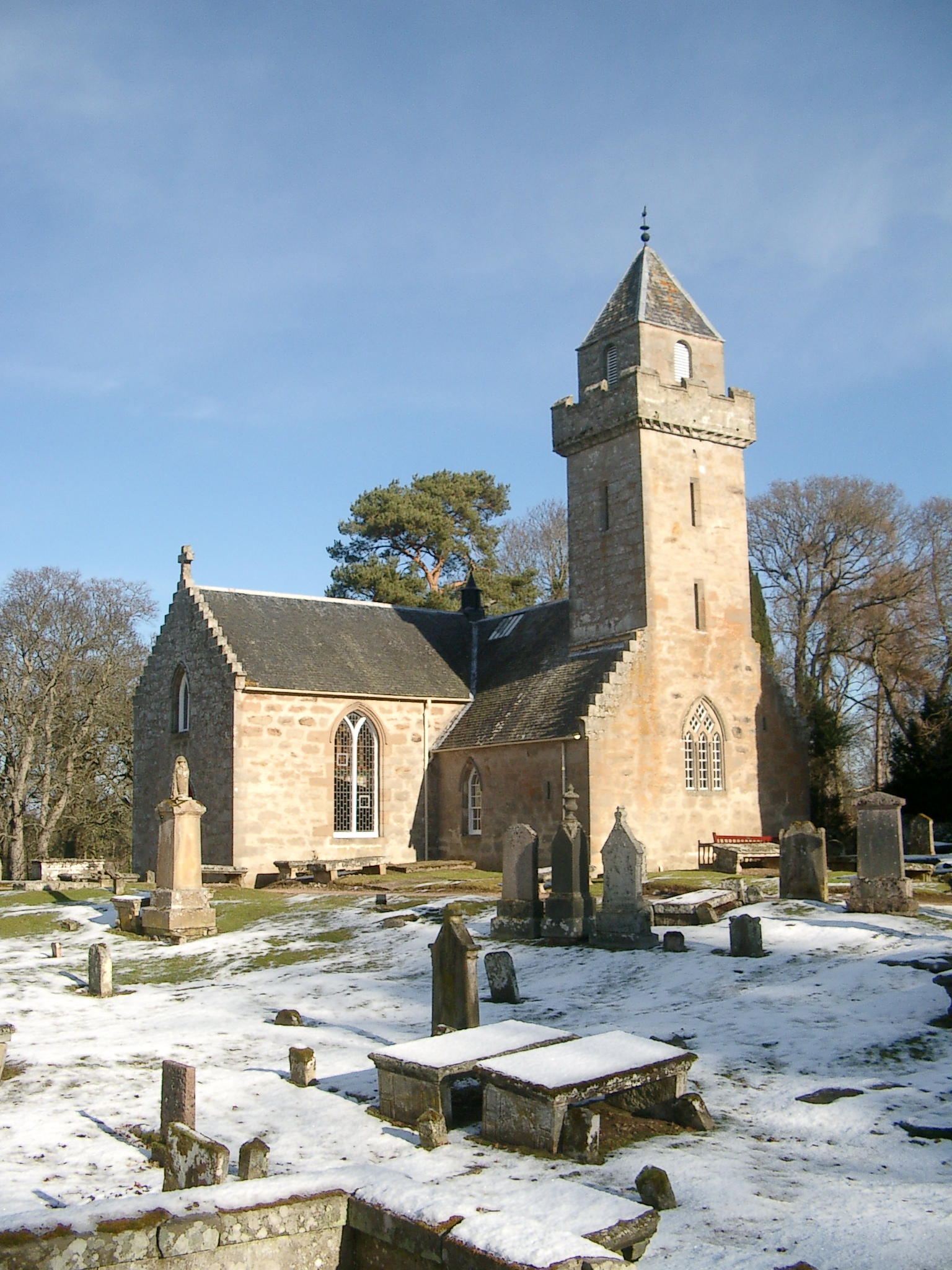
Cawdor church, built in 1619 on a Greek cross plan.

James V encountered the French version of Renaissance building while visiting for his marriage to Madeleine of Valois in 1536 and his second marriage to Mary of Guise may have resulted in longer term connections and influences. Work from his reign largely disregarded the insular style adopted in England under Henry VIII and adopted forms that were recognisably European, beginning with the extensive work at Linlithgow, the first Scottish royal residence to be described as a palace. This was followed by re-buildings at Holyrood, Falkland, Stirling and Edinburgh, described as "some of the finest examples of Renaissance architecture in Britain". Rather than slavishly copying continental forms, most Scottish architecture incorporated elements of these styles into traditional local patterns, adapting them to Scottish idioms and materials (particularly stone and harl). Work undertaken for James VI demonstrated continued Renaissance influences, with the Chapel Royal at Stirling having a classical entrance built in 1594 and the North Wing of Linlithgow, built in 1618, using classical pediments. Similar themes can be seen in the private houses of aristocrats, as in Mar's Wark, Stirling (c. 1570) and Crichton Castle, built for the Earl of Bothwell in the 1580s.

The unique style of great private house in Scotland, later known as Scots baronial, has been located in origin to the period of the 1560s. It kept many of the features of the high walled Medieval castles and may have been influenced by the French masons brought to Scotland to work on royal palaces. It drew on the tower houses and peel towers, which had been built in hundreds by local lords since the fourteenth century, particularly in the borders. These abandoned defensible curtain walls for a fortified refuge, designed to outlast a raid, rather than a sustained siege. They were usually of three stories, typically crowned with a parapet, projecting on corbels, continuing into circular bartizans at each corner. New houses retained many of these external features, but with a larger ground plan, classically a "Z-plan" of a rectangular block with towers, as at Colliston Castle (1583) and Claypotts Castle (1569–88). Particularly influential was the work of William Wallace, the king's master mason from 1617 until his death in 1631. He worked on the rebuilding of the collapsed North Range of Linlithgow from 1618, Winton House for George Seton, 3rd Earl of Winton and began work on Heriot's Hospital, Edinburgh. He adopted a distinctive style that applied elements of Scottish fortification and Flemish influences to a Renaissance plan like that used at Château d'Ancy-le-Franc. This style can be seen in lords houses built at Caerlaverlock (1620), Moray House, Edinburgh (1628) and Drumlanrig Castle (1675–89), and was highly influential until the baronial style gave way to the grander English forms associated with Inigo Jones in the later seventeenth century.

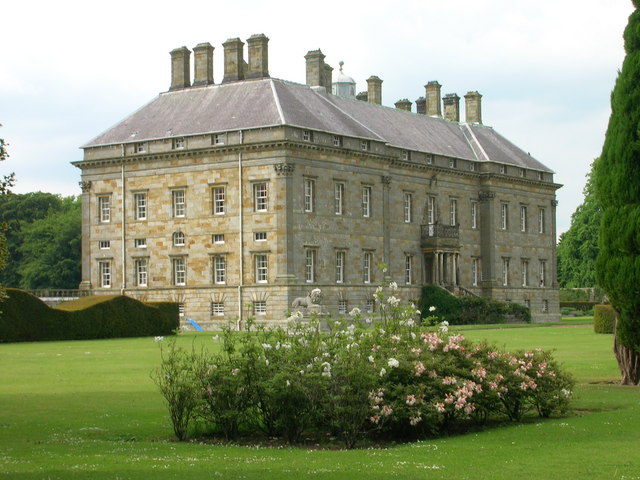
Kinross House, one of the first Palladian houses in Britain.

Calvinists rejected ornamentation in places of worship, with no need for elaborate buildings divided up by ritual, resulting in the widespread destruction of Medieval church furnishings, ornaments and decoration. There was a need to adapt and build new churches suitable for reformed services, particularly putting the pulpit and preaching at the centre of worship. Many of the earliest buildings were simple gabled rectangles, a style that continued to be built into the seventeenth century. A variation of the rectangular church that developed in post-Reformation Scotland was the T-shaped plan, often used when adapting existing churches, which allowed the maximum number of parishioners to be near the pulpit. In the seventeenth century a Greek cross plan was used for churches such as Cawdor (1619) and Fenwick (1643). In most of these cases one arm of the cross would have been closed off as a laird's aisle, meaning that they were in effect T-plan churches.

During the era of civil wars and the Commonwealth, significant building in Scotland was largely confined to military architecture. After the Restoration, large scale building began again, often incorporating more comprehensive ideas of reviving classicism. Sir William Bruce (1630–1710), was the key figure in introducing the Palladian style into Scotland, following the principles of the Venetian architect Andrea Palladio (1508–80). He built and remodelled country houses, including Thirlestane Castle and Prestonfield House. Among his most significant work was his own Palladian mansion at Kinross. As the Surveyor and Overseer of the Royal Works he undertook the rebuilding of the Royal Palace of Holyroodhouse in the 1670s, which gave the palace its present appearance. James Smith worked as a mason on the Bruce's rebuilding of Holyrood Palace. With his father-in-law, the master mason Robert Mylne, Smith worked on Caroline Park in Edinburgh (1685), and Drumlanrig Castle (1680s). Smith's country houses followed the pattern established by William Bruce, with hipped roofs and pedimented fronts, in a plain but handsome Palladian style. After the Act of Union, growing prosperity in Scotland led to a spate of new building, both public and private. William Adam (1689–1748), was the foremost architect of his time in Scotland, designing and building numerous country houses and public buildings. His individual, exuberant, style was built on the Palladian style, but with Baroque details inspired by Vanbrugh and Continental architecture.

=== Art ===
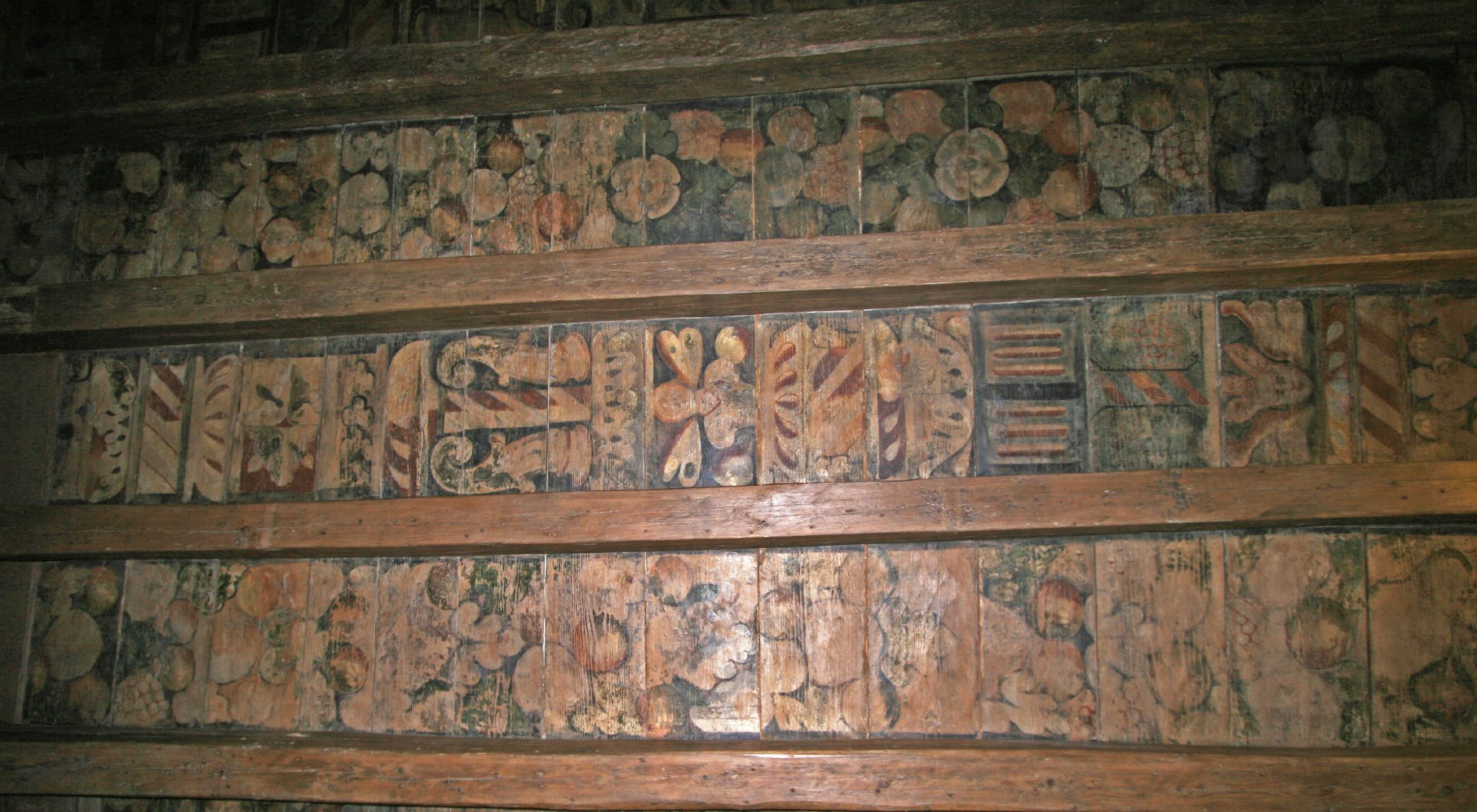
The seventeenth-century painted ceiling at Aberdour Castle, Fife.

Surviving stone and wood carvings, wall paintings and tapestries suggest the richness of sixteenth century royal art. At Stirling castle stone carvings on the royal palace from the reign of James V are taken from German patterns, and like the surviving carved oak portrait roundels from the King's Presence Chamber, known as the Stirling Heads, they include contemporary, biblical and classical figures. Scotland's ecclesiastical art suffered as a result of Reformation iconoclasm, with the almost total loss of medieval stained glass, religious sculpture and paintings. The parallel loss of ecclesiastical patronage created a crisis for native craftsmen and artists, who turned to secular patrons. One result of this was the flourishing of Scottish Renaissance painted ceilings and walls, with large numbers of private houses of burgesses, lairds and lords gaining often highly detailed and coloured patterns and scenes, of which over a hundred examples survive. These include the ceiling at Prestongrange, undertaken in 1581 for Mark Kerr, Commendator of Newbattle and the long gallery at Pinkie House, painted for Alexander Seton, Earl of Dunfermline in 1621. These were undertaken by unnamed Scottish artists using continental pattern books that often led to the incorporation of humanist moral and philosophical symbolism, with elements that call on heraldry, piety, classical myths and allegory. The tradition of royal portrait painting in Scotland was probably disrupted by the minorities and regencies it underwent for much of the sixteenth century, but began to flourish after the Reformation. There were anonymous portraits of important individuals, including the Earl of Bothwell (1566) and George, 7th Lord Seton (c. 1570s). James VI employed two Flemish artists, Arnold Bronckorst in the early 1580s, and Adrian Vanson from around 1584 to 1602, who have left us a visual record of the king and major figures at the court. The first significant native artist was George Jamesone of Aberdeen (1589/90-1644), who became one of the most successful portrait painters of the reign of Charles I and trained the Baroque artist John Michael Wright (1617–94). Many painters of the early part of the eighteenth century remained largely artisans, like the members of the Norie family, James (1684–1757) and his sons, who painted the houses of the peerage with Scottish landscapes that were pastiches of Italian and Dutch landscapes.
