= Renaissance in Scotland =

15th-17th century Scottish movement

The Renaissance in Scotland was a cultural, intellectual and artistic movement in Scotland, from the late fifteenth century to the beginning of the seventeenth century. It is associated with the pan-European Renaissance that is usually regarded as beginning in Italy in the late fourteenth century and reaching northern Europe as a Northern Renaissance in the fifteenth century. It involved an attempt to revive the principles of the classical era, including humanism, a spirit of scholarly enquiry, scepticism, and concepts of balance and proportion. Since the twentieth century, the uniqueness and unity of the Renaissance has been challenged by historians, but significant changes in Scotland can be seen to have taken place in education, intellectual life, literature, art, architecture, music, science and politics.

The court was central to the patronage and dissemination of Renaissance works and ideas. It was also central to the staging of lavish display that portrayed the political and religious role of the monarchy. The Renaissance led to the adoption of ideas of imperial monarchy, encouraging the Scottish crown to join the new monarchies by asserting imperial jurisdiction and distinction. The growing emphasis on education in the Middle Ages became part of a humanist and then Protestant programme to extend and reform learning. It resulted in the expansion of the school system and the foundation of six university colleges by the end of the sixteenth century. Relatively large numbers of Scottish scholars studied on the continent or in England and some, such as Hector Boece, John Mair, Andrew Melville and George Buchanan, returned to Scotland to play a major part in developing Scottish intellectual life. Vernacular works in Scots began to emerge in the fifteenth century, while Latin remained a major literary language. With the patronage of James V and James VI, writers included William Stewart, John Bellenden, David Lyndsay, William Fowler and Alexander Montgomerie.

In the sixteenth century, Scottish kings – particularly James V – built palaces in Renaissance style, beginning at Linlithgow. The trend soon spread to members of the aristocracy. Painting was strongly influenced by Flemish painting, with works commissioned from the continent and Flemings serving as court artists. While church art suffered iconoclasm and a loss of patronage as a result of the Reformation, house decoration and portraiture became significant for the wealthy, with George Jamesone emerging as the first major named artist in the early seventeenth century. Music also incorporated wider European influences although the Reformation caused a move from complex polyphonic church music to the simpler singing of metrical psalms. Combined with the Union of Crowns in 1603, the Reformation also removed the church and the court as sources of patronage, changing the direction of artistic creation and limiting its scope. In the early seventeenth century the major elements of the Renaissance began to give way to Mannerism and the Baroque.

== Definitions and debates ==
Renaissance is a concept formulated by cultural historian Jacob Burckhardt in the mid-nineteenth century to describe the intellectual and artistic movement that began in Italy in the fourteenth century and saw an attempt to revive the principles of the Greek and Roman classical worlds. It encompassed a rational and sceptical attitude, a return to ideas of original sources and proportion and balance in art. The major ideas of the Renaissance are generally considered to have reached Northern Europe much later, in the late fifteenth century. Scotland has been seen as part of a wider Northern Renaissance that is generally considered to have stretched into the early seventeenth century, when it was replaced by the grander styles of the Baroque. However, the association of Baroque styles with Catholicism in predominantly Protestant Scotland tended to result in this trend being overlooked and the period from about 1620 to the end of the seventeenth century is sometimes characterised as a late Renaissance.

In the twentieth century, historians disputed the validity of the concept of a Renaissance as unique, as a reaction against the "dark age" of the Medieval, as a clear break with the past and as a unified movement. Instead, they emphasised the many intellectual trends and movements that went before it, such as the twelfth-century Renaissance on which it built. It was also once common for historians to suggest that Scotland had little or no participation in the Renaissance. More recently, the significant changes in intellectual and cultural life in the period have been seen as forming a watershed in Scottish cultural history. This has been perceived as opening the path for the Reformation, and later for the modernisation of thought and social life in the Enlightenment and Industrial Revolution, to which Scotland would make a significant contribution.

== Court and kingship ==
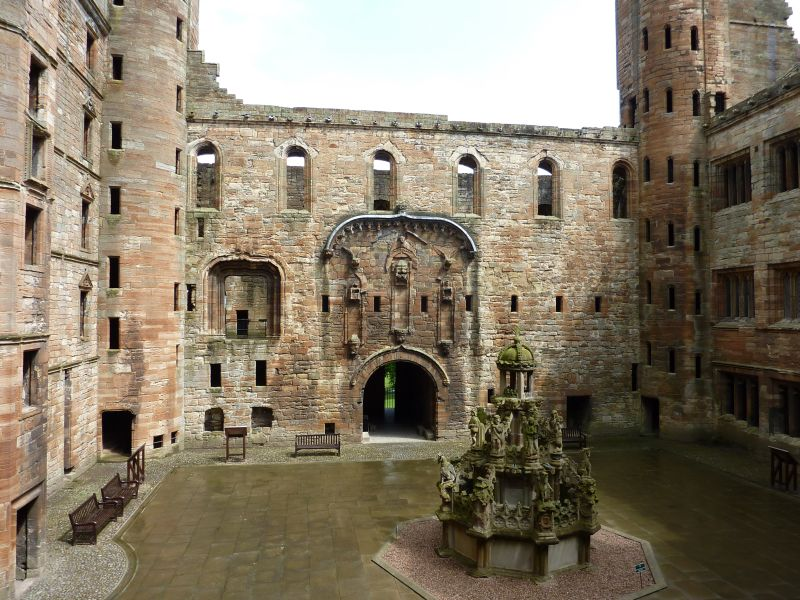
Linlithgow Palace, rebuilt for James V to suggest an open-air Renaissance courtyard

The court was central to the patronage and dissemination of Renaissance works and ideas. It was also central to the staging of lavish display that portrayed the political and religious role of the monarchy. This display was often tied up with ideas of chivalry, which was evolving in this period from a practical military ethos into a more ornamental and honorific cult. It saw its origins in the classical era, with Hector of Troy, Alexander the Great and Julius Caesar often depicted as proto-knights. Tournaments provided one focus of display, the most famous being those of the Wild Knight in 1507 and the Black Lady in 1508 under James IV. They were also pursued enthusiastically by James V who, proud of his membership of international orders of knighthood, displayed their insignia on the Gateway at Linlithgow Palace.

During her brief personal rule, Mary, Queen of Scots brought with her many of the elaborate court activities that she had grown up with at the French court. She introduced balls, masques and celebrations designed to illustrate the resurgence of the monarchy and to facilitate national unity. The most elaborate event was the baptism of the future James VI at Stirling Castle in 1566, organised by her French servant Bastian Pagez. This combined complex imagery, incorporating classical themes of the goddess Astraea and the revival of the classical golden age, with the chivalry of the Round Table. The ceremony was followed by a banquet, hunts, feasting, poetry, dance and theatre, cumulating in a staged siege and fireworks. The court returned to being a centre of culture and learning under James VI. He cultivated the image of a philosopher king, evoking the models of David, Solomon and Constantine that were seen in his "joyous entry" into Edinburgh in 1579. The grandest event of his reign was the baptism of his son and heir Prince Henry in 1595. For this, the Chapel Royal at Stirling Castle was rebuilt to mirror the proportions of the Temple of Solomon. There were three days of feasting, a staged tournament and a masque featuring a ship of state crewed by classical deities and muses. Masterminded by William Fowler, it was pointedly designed to build the image of the king and support his claim to the English and Irish thrones.

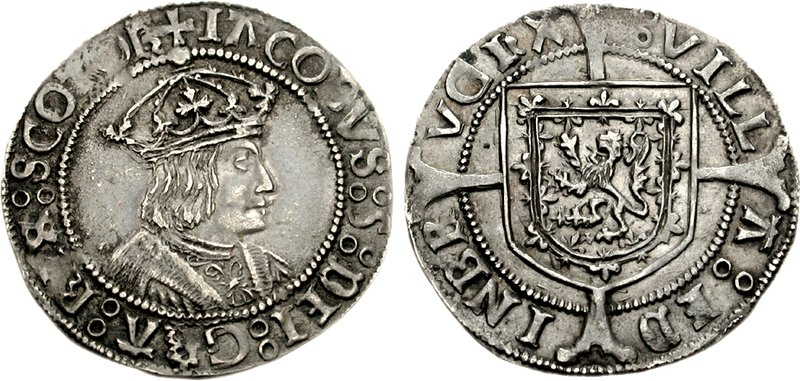
Groat of James V, showing him wearing an imperial closed crown

New ideas also affected views of government, described as new or Renaissance monarchy, which emphasised the status and significance of the monarch. The Roman Law principle that "a king is emperor in his own kingdom", can be seen in Scotland from the mid-fifteenth century. In 1469, Parliament passed an act declaring that James III possessed "full jurisdiction and empire within his realm". From the 1480s, the king's image on his silver groats showed him wearing a closed, arched, imperial crown, in place of the open circlet of medieval kings, probably the first coin image of its kind outside Italy. It soon began to appear in heraldry, on royal seals, manuscripts, sculptures and as crown steeples on churches with royal connections, as at St. Giles Cathedral, Edinburgh. The first Scottish monarch to wear such a crown was James V, whose diadem was reworked to include arches in 1532. They were included when it was reconstructed in 1540, subsisting in the Crown of Scotland. The idea of imperial monarchy emphasised the dignity of the crown and included its role as a unifying national force, defending national borders and interests, royal supremacy over the law and a distinctive national church within the Catholic communion. New Monarchy can also be seen in the reliance of the crown on "new men" rather than the great magnates, the use of the clergy as a form of civil service, the development of standing armed forces and a navy. The aggrandisement of the monarchy reached its apogee in James VI's development of the concept of imperial rule into a divine right. However, the royal image of James in Scotland may have competed with that of his wife Anna of Denmark who maintained a separate parallel court with a distinct identity, and in the first years of the 1590s she and her courtiers wore Danish fashions.

== Education ==
=== Schools ===
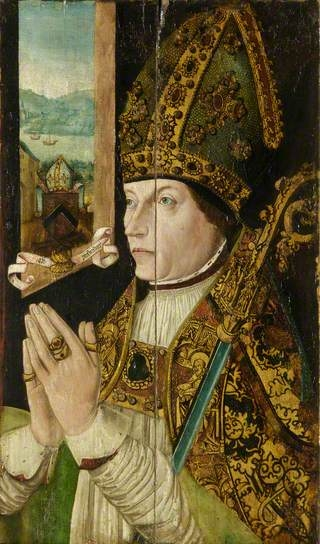
William Elphinstone, bishop of Aberdeen, founder of the University of Aberdeen and probably the architect of the Education Act 1496

In the early Middle Ages, formal education was limited to monastic life, but from the twelfth century new sources of education had begun to develop, with song and grammar schools. These were usually attached to cathedrals or a collegiate church and were most common in the developing burghs. By the end of the Middle Ages grammar schools could be found in all the main burghs and some small towns. There were also petty schools, more common in rural areas and providing an elementary education. They were almost exclusively aimed at boys, but by the end of the fifteenth century, Edinburgh also had schools for girls. These were sometimes described as "sewing schools", and probably taught by laywomen or nuns. There was also the development of private tuition in the families of lords and wealthy burghers. The growing emphasis on education in the late Middle Ages, cumulated with the passing of the Education Act 1496, which decreed that all sons of barons and freeholders of substance should attend grammar schools and which endorsed the humanist concern to learn "perfyct Latyne". All this resulted in an increase in literacy, although it was largely concentrated among a male and wealthy elite, with perhaps 60 per cent of the nobility being literate by the end of the fifteenth century.

The humanist concern with widening education was shared by the Protestant reformers, with a desire for a godly people replacing the aim of having educated citizens. In 1560, the First Book of Discipline set out a plan for a school in every parish but proved financially impossible. In the burghs, the old schools were maintained, with the song schools and a number of new foundations becoming reformed grammar schools or ordinary parish schools. Schools were supported by a combination of kirk funds, contributions from local heritors or burgh councils and from parents that could pay. They were inspected by kirk sessions, who checked for the quality of teaching and doctrinal purity.

There was also a large number of unregulated "adventure schools", which sometimes fulfilled a local need and sometimes took pupils away from the official schools. Outside the established burgh schools, a master often combined his position with other employment, particularly minor posts within the kirk, such as clerk. At best the curriculum included catechism, Latin, French, Classical literature and sports. It took until the late seventeenth century to produce a largely complete network of parish schools in the Lowlands, and in the Highlands basic education was still lacking in many areas by the time the Education Act was passed in 1696, forming the basis of the system's administration until 1873.

=== Universities ===
The Renaissance of the 12th century resulted in the emergence of some major intellectual figures from Scotland. Probably the most significant was John Duns Scotus (c. 1265–1308), a major influence on late medieval religious thought. After the outbreak of the Wars of Independence in 1296, English universities were largely closed to Scots and continental universities became more significant. Just over a thousand Scots have been identified as attending continental universities between the 12th century and 1410. Some Scottish scholars became teachers in continental universities, such as Walter Wardlaw (died 1387) and Laurence de Lindores (1372?–1437). This situation was transformed by the founding of the University of St Andrews in 1413, the University of Glasgow in 1450 and the University of Aberdeen in 1495. Initially, these institutions were designed for the training of clerics but would increasingly be used by laymen who began to challenge the clerical monopoly of administrative posts in government and law. In this period Scottish universities did not teach Greek, focused on metaphysics and put a largely unquestioning faith in the works of Aristotle. Those wanting to study for second degrees still needed to go elsewhere. Scottish scholars continued to study on the Continent and at English universities which reopened to Scots in the late fifteenth century.

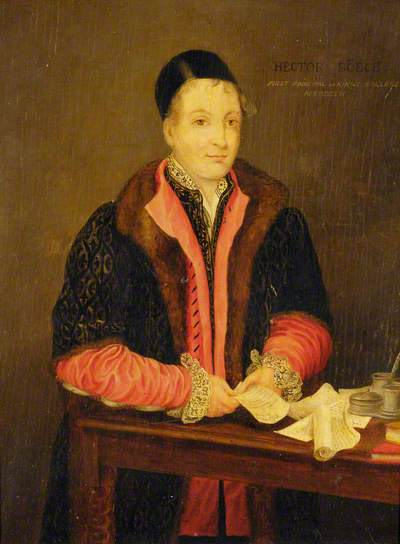
Hector Boece (1465–1536), a major figure in European humanism, who returned to be the first principal of the University of Aberdeen

As early as 1495 some Scots were in contact with the leading figure in the Northern humanist movement, the Netherlands-born Desiderius Erasmus (1466–1536). They were also in contact with the French humanist and scholar Jacques Lefèvre d'Étaples (c. 1455 –1536). Erasmus was tutor to James VI's illegitimate son, and Archbishop of St. Andrews, Alexander Stewart (c. 1493–1513). These international contacts helped integrate Scotland into a wider European scholarly world and would be one of the most important ways in which the new ideas of humanism were brought into Scottish intellectual life. By 1497 the humanist and historian Hector Boece, born in Dundee and who had studied at Paris, returned to become the first principal at the new university of Aberdeen. The continued movement to other universities produced a school of Scottish nominalists at Paris in the early sixteenth century, the most important of whom was John Mair, generally described as a scholastic, but whose Latin History of Greater Britain (1521) was sympathetic to the humanist social agenda. Another major figure was Archibald Whitelaw, who taught at St. Andrews and Cologne, becoming a tutor to the young James III and royal secretary from 1462 to 1493. Robert Reid, Abbot of Kinloss and later Bishop of Orkney, was responsible in the 1520s and 1530s for bringing the Italian humanist Giovanni Ferrario to teach at Kinloss Abbey, where he established an impressive library and wrote works of Scottish history and biography. Reid was also instrumental in organising the public lectures which were established in Edinburgh in the 1540s on law, Greek, Latin and philosophy, under the patronage of Mary of Guise. They developed into the "Tounis College", which would become the University of Edinburgh in 1582.

After the Reformation, Scotland's universities underwent a series of reforms associated with Andrew Melville, who returned from Geneva to become principal of the University of Glasgow in 1574. Influenced by the anti-Aristotelian Petrus Ramus, he placed an emphasis on simplified logic, elevating languages and sciences to the status enjoyed by philosophy and allowing accepted ideas in all areas to be challenged. He introduced new specialist teaching staff, replacing the system of "regenting", where one tutor took the students through the entire arts curriculum. Metaphysics was abandoned and Greek became compulsory in the first year, followed by Aramaic, Syriac and Hebrew, launching a new fashion for ancient and biblical languages. Glasgow had probably been declining as a university before his arrival, but students now began to attend in large numbers. Melville assisted in the reconstruction of Marischal College, Aberdeen, and in order to do for St Andrews what he had done for Glasgow, he was appointed Principal of St Mary's College, St Andrews in 1580. The result was a revitalisation of all Scottish universities, which were now producing a quality of education the equal of that offered anywhere in Europe.

Major intellectual figures in the Reformation included George Buchanan. He taught in universities in France and Portugal, translated texts from Greek into Latin, and was tutor to the young Mary, Queen of Scots for whom he wrote Latin courtly poetry and masques. After her deposition in 1567, his works De Jure Regni apud Scotos (1579) and Rerum Scoticarum Historia (1582) were among the major texts outlining the case for resistance to tyrants. Buchanan was one of the young James VI's tutors and although he helped in producing a highly educated Protestant prince, who would produce works on subjects including government, poetry and witchcraft, he failed to convince the king of his ideas about limited monarchy. James would debate with both Buchanan and Melville over the status of the crown and kirk.

== Literature ==
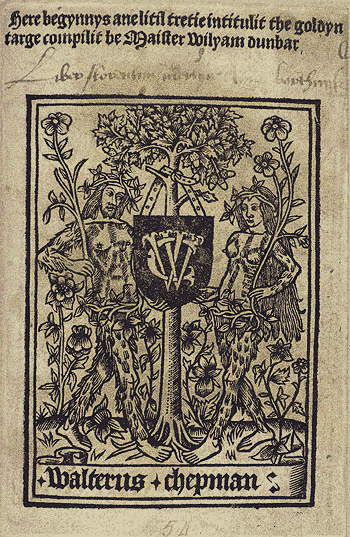
Front page of William Dunbar's The Goldyn Targe (a 1508 print)

In the late fifteenth century, Scots prose also began to develop as a genre and to demonstrate classical and humanist influences. Although there are earlier fragments of original Scots prose, such as the Auchinleck Chronicle, the first complete surviving work includes John Ireland's The Meroure of Wyssdome (1490). There were also prose translations of French books of chivalry that survive from the 1450s, including The Book of the Law of Armys and the Order of Knychthode and the treatise Secreta Secetorum, an Arabic work believed to be Aristotle's advice to Alexander the Great.

The establishment of a printing press under royal patent from James IV in 1507 made it easier to disseminate Scottish literature. The landmark work in the reign of James IV was Gavin Douglas's version of Virgil's Aeneid, the Eneados. It was the first complete translation of a major classical text in an Anglic language, finished in 1513, but overshadowed by the disaster at Flodden. Much Middle Scots literature was produced by makars, poets with links to the royal court. These included James I (who wrote The Kingis Quair). Many of the makars had a university education and so were also connected with the Kirk. However, William Dunbar's Lament for the Makaris (c.1505) provides evidence of a wider tradition of secular writing outside of Court and Kirk now largely lost. Before the advent of printing in Scotland, writers such as Dunbar, Douglas, together with Robert Henryson and Walter Kennedy, have been seen as leading a golden age in Scottish poetry. They continued medieval themes, but were increasingly influenced by new continental trends and the language and forms of the Renaissance.

As a patron, James V supported poets William Stewart and John Bellenden. Stewart produced a verse version of the Latin History of Scotland compiled in 1527 by Boece and Bellenden produced a prose translation of Livy's History of Rome in 1533. Sir David Lindsay of the Mount the Lord Lyon, the head of the Lyon Court and diplomat, was a prolific poet. He produced an interlude at Linlithgow Palace thought to be a version of his play The Thrie Estaitis in 1540, the first surviving full Scottish play, which satirised the corruption of church and state, making use of elements such as medieval morality plays, with a humanist agenda.

In the 1580s and 1590s James VI promoted the literature of the country of his birth. His treatise, Some Rules and Cautions to be Observed and Eschewed in Scottish Prosody, published in 1584 when he was aged 18, was both a poetic manual and a description of the poetic tradition in his mother tongue, Scots, to which he applied Renaissance principles. He became patron and member of a loose circle of Scottish Jacobean court poets and musicians, the Castalian Band, which included William Fowler and Alexander Montgomerie. By the late 1590s, his championing of his native Scottish tradition was to some extent diffused by the prospect of inheriting the English throne, and some courtier poets who followed the king to London after 1603, such as William Alexander, began to anglicise their written language. James's characteristic role as active literary participant and patron in the Scottish court made him a defining figure for English Renaissance poetry and drama, which would reach a pinnacle of achievement in his reign, but his patronage for the high style in his own Scottish tradition largely became sidelined.

== Architecture ==
The influence of the Renaissance on Scottish architecture has been seen as occurring in two distinct phases. The selective use of Romanesque forms in church architecture in the early fifteenth century was followed towards the end of the century by a phase of more directly influenced Renaissance palace building. The re-adoption of low-massive church building with round arches and pillars, in contrast to the Gothic Perpendicular style that was particularly dominant in England in the late medieval era, may have been influenced by close contacts with Rome and the Netherlands, and may have been a conscious reaction to English forms in favour of continental ones. It can be seen in the nave of Dunkeld Cathedral, begun in 1406, the facade of St Mary's, Haddington from the 1460s and in the chapel of Bishop Elphinstone's Kings College, Aberdeen (1500–9). About forty collegiate churches were established in Scotland in the late fifteenth and early sixteenth centuries. Many, like Trinity College, Edinburgh, showed a combination of Gothic and Renaissance styles.

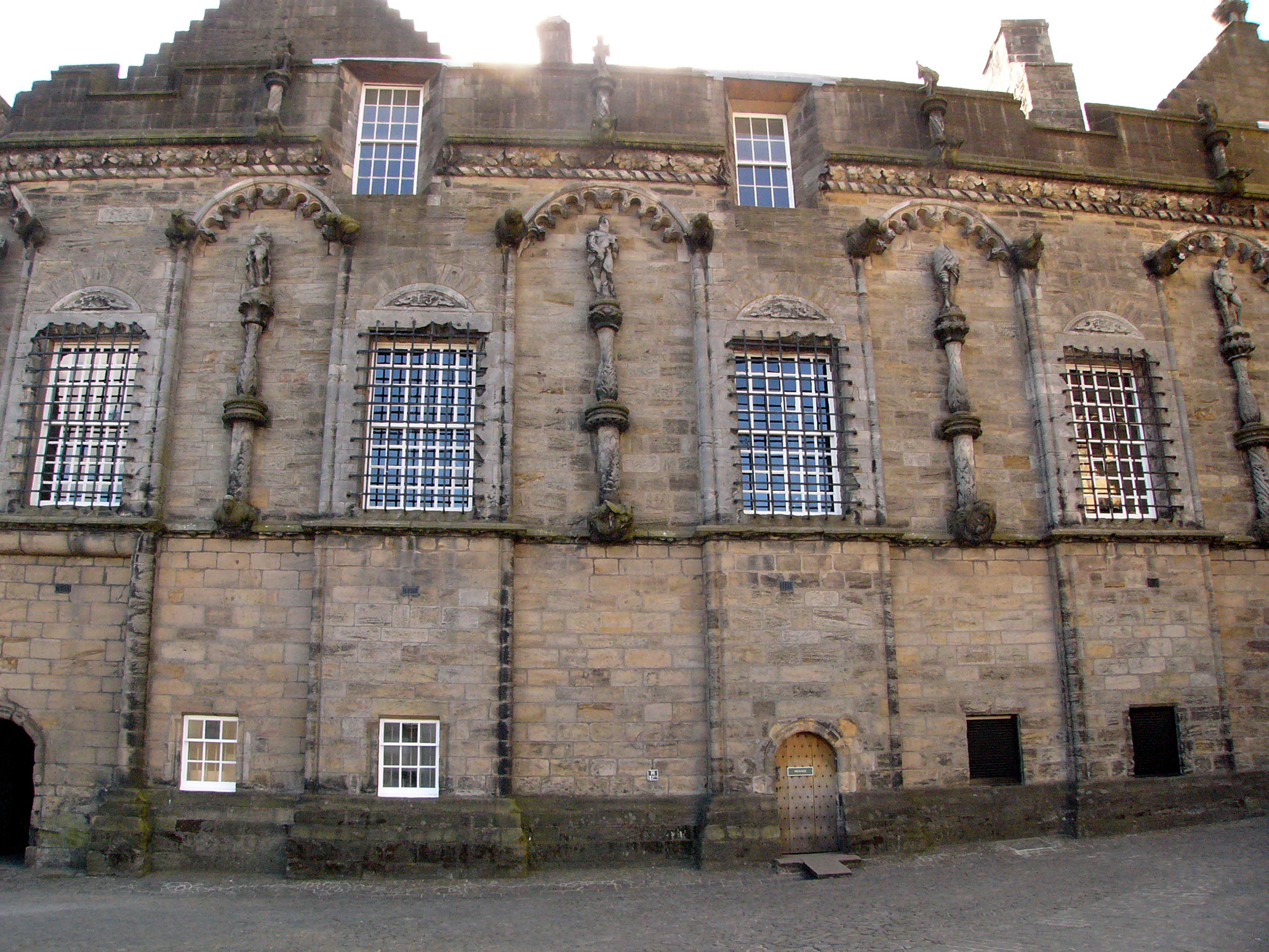
The sculptural decoration of James V's place at Stirling Castle

The extensive building and rebuilding of royal palaces probably began under James III, accelerated under James IV, reaching its peak under James V. These works have been seen as directly reflecting the influence of Renaissance styles. Linlithgow was first constructed under James I, under the direction of master of work John de Waltoun. From 1429, it was referred to as a palace, apparently the first use of this term in the country. This was extended under James III and began to correspond to a fashionable quadrangular, corner-towered Italian seignorial palace of a palatium ad moden castri (a castle-style palace), combining classical symmetry with neo-chivalric imagery. There is evidence of Italian masons working for James IV, in whose reign Linlithgow was completed and other palaces were rebuilt with Italianate proportions.

James V encountered the French version of Renaissance building while visiting for his marriage to Madeleine of Valois in 1536 and his second marriage to Mary of Guise may have resulted in longer-term connections and influences. Work from his reign largely disregarded the insular style of Tudor architecture prevalent in England under Henry VIII and adopted forms that were recognisably European, beginning with the extensive work at Linlithgow. This was followed by rebuildings at Holyrood, Falkland, Stirling and Edinburgh, described as "some of the finest examples of Renaissance architecture in Britain". Rather than slavishly copying continental forms, most Scottish architecture incorporated elements of these styles into traditional local patterns, adapting them to Scottish idioms and materials (particularly stone and harl). Work undertaken for James VI demonstrated continued Renaissance influences, with the Chapel Royal at Stirling having a classical entrance built in 1594 and the North Wing of Linlithgow, built in 1618, using classical pediments. Similar themes can be seen in the private houses of aristocrats, as in Mar's Wark, Stirling (c. 1570) and Crichton Castle, built for the Earl of Bothwell in the 1580s.

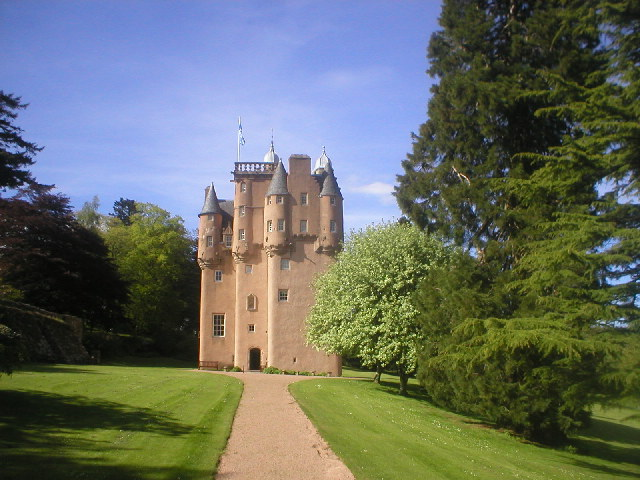
Craigievar Castle

New military architecture and the trace italienne style was brought by Italian architects and military engineers during the war of the Rough Wooing and the regency of Mary of Guise including Migliorino Ubaldini who worked at Edinburgh Castle, Camillo Marini who designed forts on the borders, and Lorenzo Pomarelli who worked for Mary of Guise. The unique style of great private houses in Scotland, revived by the Victorians as Scots baronial, has been located in origin to the period of the 1560s. It kept many of the features of the high walled Medieval castles that had been largely made obsolete by gunpowder weapons and may have been influenced by the French masons brought to Scotland to work on royal palaces. It drew on the tower houses and peel towers, which had been built in hundreds by local lords since the fourteenth century, particularly in the borders. These abandoned defensible curtain walls for a fortified refuge, designed to outlast a raid, rather than a sustained siege. They were usually of three stories, typically crowned with a parapet, projecting on corbels, continuing into circular bartizans at each corner. New houses retained many of these external features, but with a larger ground plan, classically a "Z-plan" of a rectangular block with towers, as at Colliston Castle (1583) and Claypotts Castle (1569–88). Some tower houses of the 16th and 17th centuries, especially those in Aberdeenshire like Crathes and Craigievar, dissolved into a riot of ornamental tourelles at their crowns.

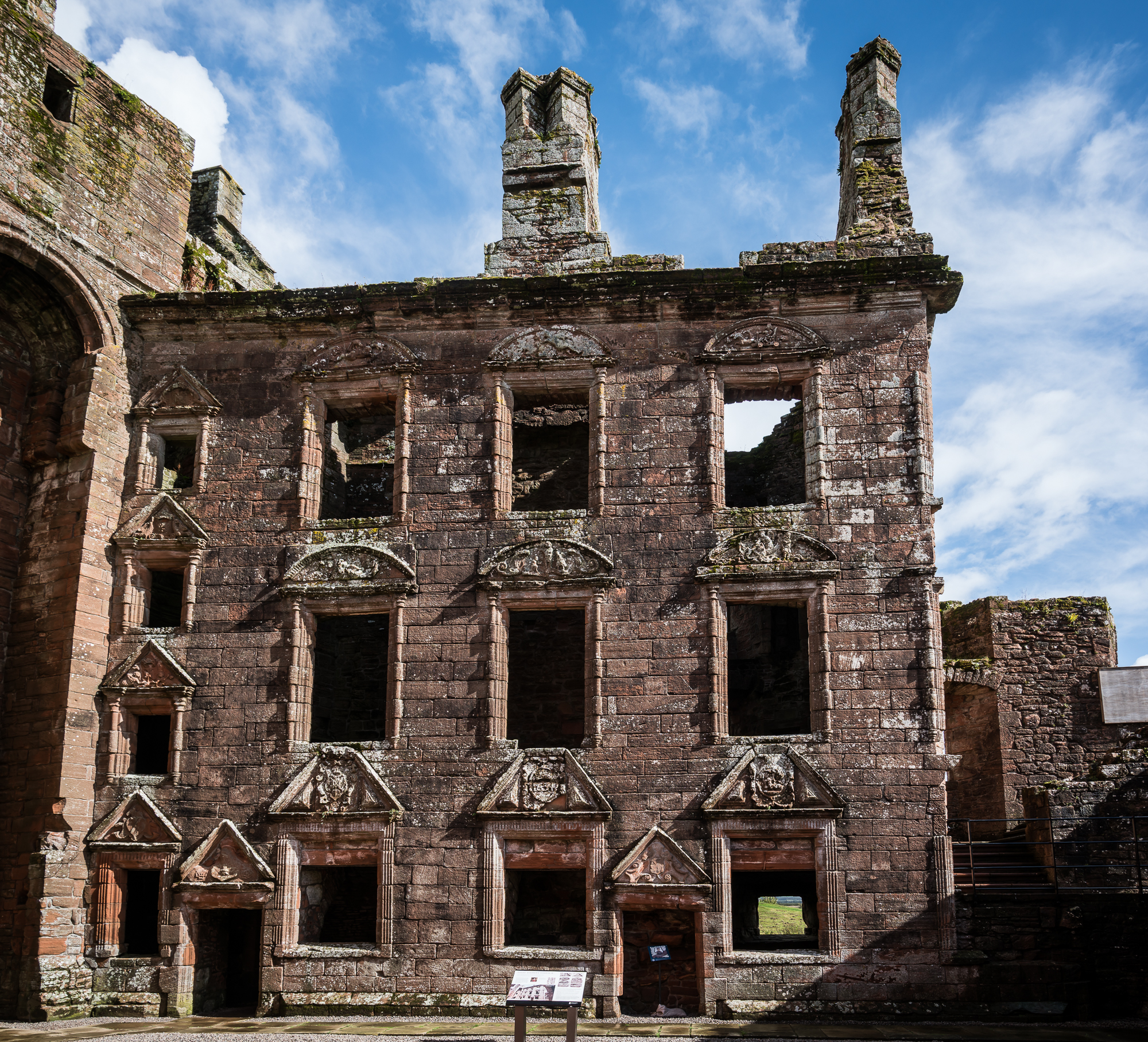
The ruined Nithsdale Lodging at Caerlaverock Castle

Particularly influential was the work of William Wallace, the king's master mason from 1617 until his death in 1631. He worked on the rebuilding of the collapsed North Range of Linlithgow from 1618, Winton House for George Seton, 3rd Earl of Winton and began work on Heriot's Hospital, Edinburgh. He adopted a distinctive style that applied elements of Scottish fortification and Flemish influences to a Renaissance plan like that used at Château d'Ancy-le-Franc. This style can be seen in lords' houses built at Caerlaverlock (1620), Moray House, Edinburgh (1628) and Drumlanrig Castle (1675–89), and was highly influential until the Scottish Renaissance style gave way to the more 'correctly' Classical English forms associated with Inigo Jones in the later seventeenth century.

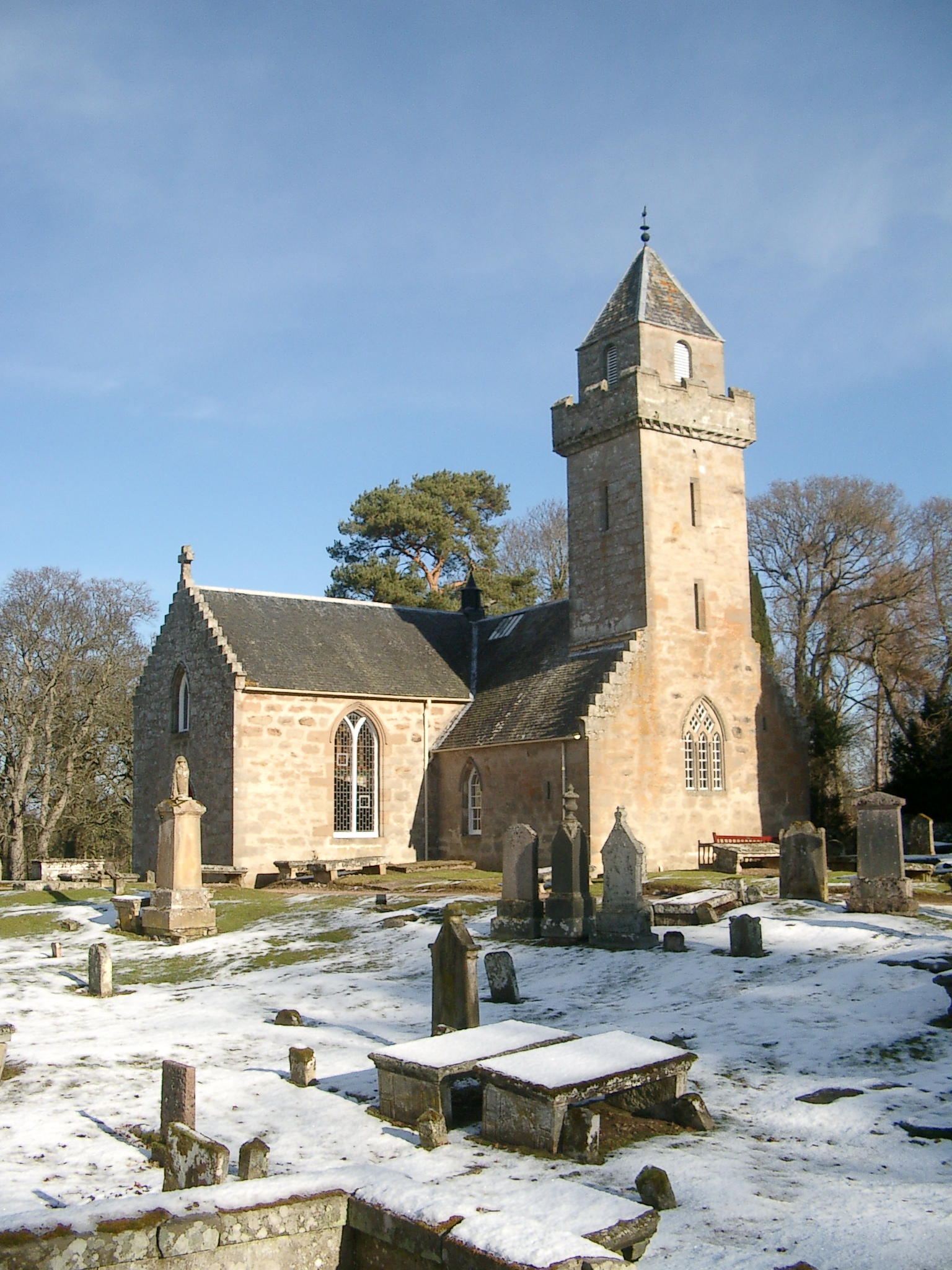
Cawdor church, built in 1619 on a Greek cross plan

From about 1560, the Reformation revolutionised church architecture in Scotland. Calvinists rejected ornamentation in places of worship, with no need for elaborate buildings divided up by ritual, resulting in the widespread destruction of Medieval church furnishings, ornaments and decoration. There was a need to adapt and build new churches suitable for reformed services, with greater emphasis on preaching and the pulpit. Many of the earliest buildings were simple gabled rectangles, a style that continued to be built into the seventeenth century, as at Dunnottar Castle in the 1580s, Greenock (1591) and Durness (1619). The church of Greyfriars, Edinburgh, built between 1602 and 1620, used this layout with a largely Gothic form while that at Dirleton (1612) had a more sophisticated classical style. A variation of the rectangular church that developed in post-Reformation Scotland was the T-shaped plan, often used when adapting existing churches as it allowed the maximum number of parishioners to be near the pulpit. Examples can be seen at Kemback in Fife (1582) and Prestonpans after 1595. The "T" plan continued to be used into the seventeenth century as at Weem (1600), Anstruther Easter, Fife (1634–44) and New Cumnock (1657). In the seventeenth century a Greek cross plan was used for churches such as Cawdor (1619) and Fenwick (1643). In most of these cases one arm of the cross was closed off as a laird's aisle, with the result that they were in effect T-plan churches.

== Art ==
Little is known about native Scottish artists in the Middle Ages. As in England, the monarchy may have had model portraits of royalty used for copies and reproductions, but the versions of native royal portraits that survive from the late Middle Ages are generally crude by continental standards. Much more impressive are the works or artists imported from the continent, particularly the Netherlands, generally considered the centre of painting in the Northern Renaissance. The products of these connections included a fine portrait of William Elphinstone; the images of St Catherine and St John brought to Dunkeld; Hugo van Der Goes's altarpiece for the Trinity College Church in Edinburgh, commissioned by James III; and the work after which the Flemish Master of James IV of Scotland is named. There are also a relatively large number of elaborate devotional books from the late fifteenth and early sixteenth centuries, usually produced in the Low Countries and France for Scottish patrons. These included the prayer book commissioned by Robert Blackadder, Bishop of Glasgow, between 1484 and 1492 and the Flemish illustrated book of hours, known as the Hours of James IV of Scotland, given by James IV to Margaret Tudor and described as "perhaps the finest medieval manuscript to have been commissioned for Scottish use".

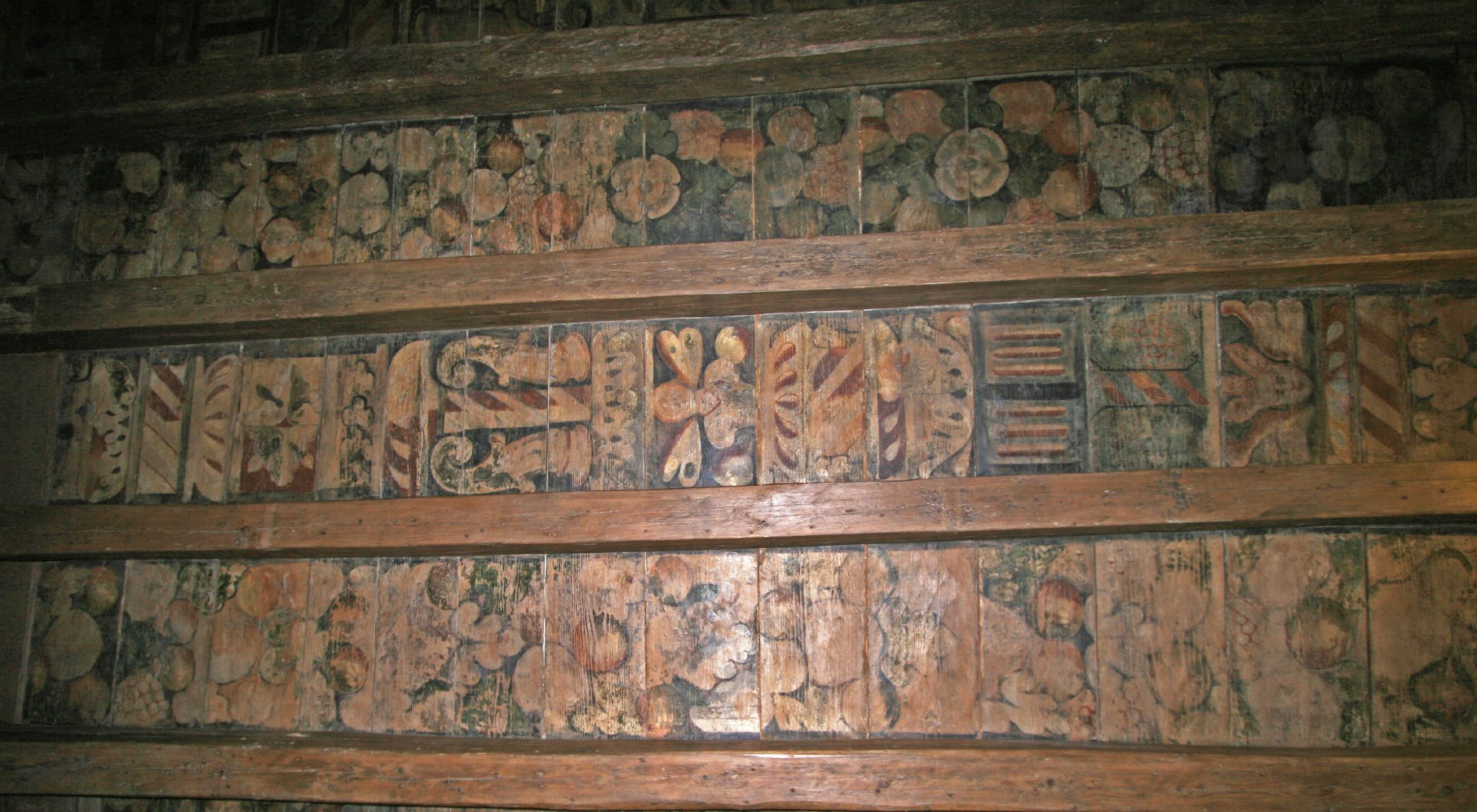
The seventeenth-century painted ceiling at Aberdour Castle, Fife

Surviving stone and wood carvings, wall paintings and Scottish Royal tapestries suggest the richness of sixteenth century royal art. At Stirling Castle, stone carvings on the royal palace from the reign of James V are taken from German patterns, and like the surviving carved oak portrait roundels from the King's Presence Chamber, known as the Stirling Heads, they include contemporary, biblical and classical figures. Some decorative wood carvings were made by French craftsmen, who like Andrew Mansioun, settled in Scotland. Scotland's ecclesiastical art paid a heavy toll as a result of Reformation iconoclasm, with the almost total loss of medieval stained glass, religious sculpture and paintings. The parallel loss of patronage created a crisis for native craftsmen and artists, who turned to secular patrons. One result of this was the flourishing of Scottish Renaissance painted ceilings and walls, with large numbers of private houses of burgesses, lairds and lords gaining often highly detailed and coloured patterns and scenes. Over a hundred examples are known to have existed, and surviving paintings include the ceiling at Prestongrange, undertaken in 1581 for Mark Kerr, Commendator of Newbattle, and the long gallery at Pinkie House, painted for Alexander Seaton, Earl of Dunfermline, in 1621. These were undertaken by unnamed Scottish artists using continental pattern books that often led to the incorporation of humanist moral and philosophical symbolism, with elements that call on heraldry, piety, classical myths and allegory.

In 1502 Henry VII sent his Flemish portrait painter Maynard Wewyck to the court of James IV and Margaret Tudor. Later in the sixteenth-century anonymous artists made portraits of important individuals, including the Earl of Bothwell and his first wife Jean Gordon (1566), and George, 7th Lord Seton (c. 1575). The tradition of royal portrait painting in Scotland was probably disrupted by minorities and regencies between 1513 and 1579. James VI employed two Flemish artists, Arnold Bronckorst (floruit, in Scotland, 1580–1583) and Adrian Vanson (fl. 1581–1602), who have left us a visual record of the king and major figures at the court. Anna of Denmark brought a jeweller Jacob Kroger (d. 1594) from Lüneburg, a centre of the goldsmith's craft. The first significant native artist was George Jamesone of Aberdeen (1589/90–644), who became one of the most successful portrait painters of the reign of Charles I and trained the Baroque artist John Michael Wright (1617–94).

== Music ==
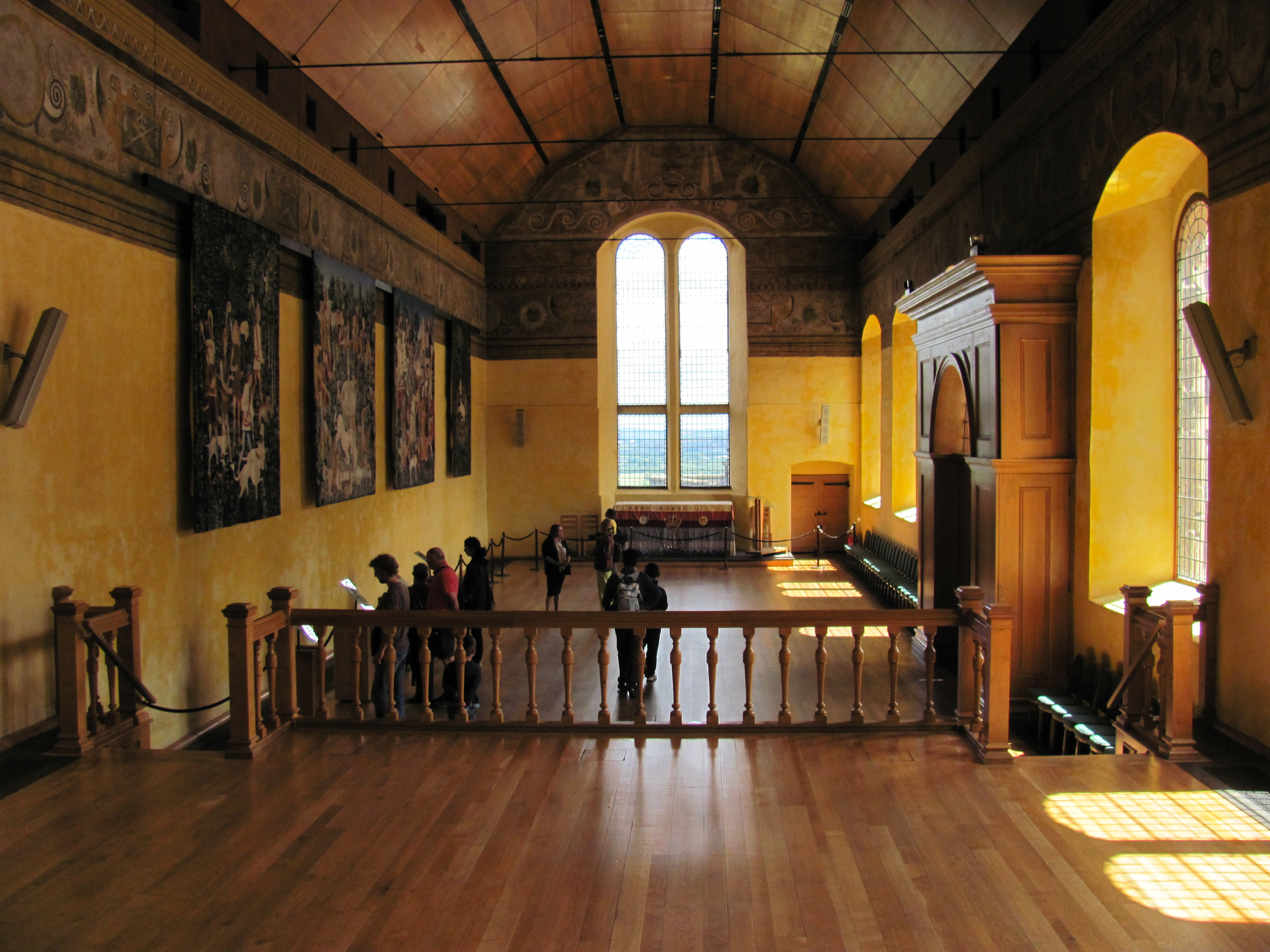
The interior of the Chapel Royal, Stirling Castle, a major focus for liturgical music

The captivity of James I in England from 1406 to 1423, where he earned a reputation as a poet and composer, may have led him to take English and continental styles and musicians back to the Scottish court on his release. In the late fifteenth century a series of Scottish musicians trained in the Netherlands, then the centre of musical production in Western Europe, before returning home. They included John Broune, Thomas Inglis and John Fety, the last of whom became master of the song school in Aberdeen and then Edinburgh, introducing the new five-fingered organ playing technique. In 1501, James IV refounded the Chapel Royal within Stirling Castle, with a new and enlarged choir and it became the focus of Scottish liturgical music. Burgundian and English influences were probably reinforced when Henry VII's daughter Margaret Tudor married James IV in 1503. The outstanding Scottish composer of the first half of the sixteenth century was Robert Carver (c. 1488–1558), a canon of Scone Abbey. Five masses and two votive antiphons have survived in his choirbook. One of the masses provides the only example of the use of the continental fashion of the cantus firmus to have survived in Britain. The antiphon "Oh Bone Jesu" was scored for 19 voices, perhaps to commemorate the 19th year of the reign of James V. His complex polyphonic music could only have been performed by a large and highly trained choir such as the one employed in the Chapel Royal. James V was also a patron to figures including David Peebles (c. 1510–79?), whose best known work "Si quis diligit me" (text from John 14:23), is a motet for four voices. These were probably only two of many accomplished composers of their times, their work surviving largely in fragments.

In this era Scotland followed the trend of Renaissance courts for instrumental accompaniment and playing. Accounts indicate that there were lutenists at the court from the reign of James III and in the houses of the great lords and clergymen. Instruments also appear in art of the period, with a ceiling at Crathes Castle showing muses with lute, bass viol, fiddle, harp, cittern, flute and clavicord, similar to a mixed consort found in England in this period. Music also became one of the accomplishments of the Renaissance courtier and even royalty. James IV entertained his bride Margaret Tudor during their marriage celebrations by playing "the clarychords and lute" and Margaret herself had been taught the lute as a child. James V, as well as being a major patron of sacred music, was a talented lute player and introduced French chansons and consorts of viols to his court, although almost nothing of this secular chamber music survives.

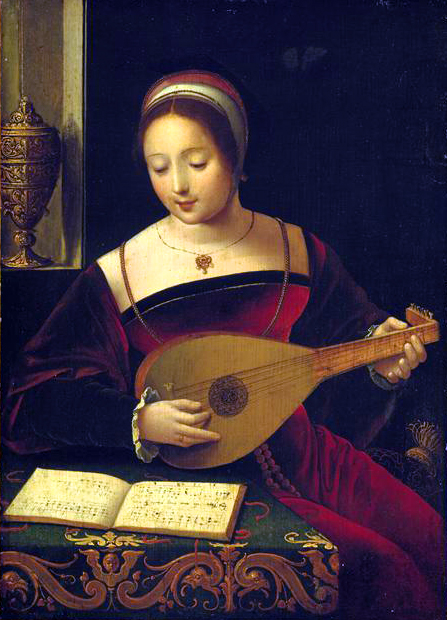
The playing of instruments, including the lute, became one of the major accomplishments expected of a Renaissance courtier.

The Reformation would severely affect church music. The song schools of the abbeys, cathedrals and collegiate churches were closed down, choirs disbanded, music books and manuscripts destroyed and organs removed from churches. The Lutheranism that influenced the early Scottish Reformation attempted to accommodate Catholic musical traditions into worship, drawing on Latin hymns and vernacular songs. The most important product of this tradition in Scotland was The Gude and Godlie Ballatis, which were spiritual satires on popular ballads composed by the brothers James, John and Robert Wedderburn. Never adopted by the kirk, they nevertheless remained popular and were reprinted from the 1540s to the 1620s. Later the Calvinism that came to dominate the Scottish Reformation was much more hostile to Catholic musical tradition and popular music, placing an emphasis on what was biblical, which meant the Psalms. The Scottish psalter of 1564 was commissioned by the Assembly of the Church. It drew on the work of French musician Clément Marot, Calvin's contributions to the Strasbourg psalter of 1529 and English writers, particularly the 1561 edition of the psalter produced by William Whittingham for the English congregation in Geneva. The intention was to produce individual tunes for each psalm, but of 150 psalms, 105 had proper tunes and in the seventeenth century, common tunes, which could be used for psalms with the same metre, became more common. The need for simplicity for whole congregations that would now all sing these psalms, unlike the trained choirs who had sung the many parts of polyphonic hymns, necessitated simplicity and most church compositions were confined to homophonic settings. There is some evidence that polyphony survived and was incorporated into editions of the psalter from 1625, but usually with the congregation singing the melody and trained singers the contra-tenor, treble and bass parts.

The return of James V's daughter Mary from France in 1561 to begin her personal reign, and her position as a Catholic, gave a new lease of life to the choir of the Scottish Chapel Royal, but the destruction of Scottish church organs meant that instrumentation to accompany the mass had to employ bands of musicians with trumpets, drums, fifes, bagpipes and tabors. Like her father, she played the lute, virginals and (unlike her father) was a fine singer. She brought French musical influences with her, employing lutenists and viol players in her household including the English Hudson brothers.

James VI was a major patron of the arts in general. He made statutory provision to reform and promote the teaching of music, attempting to revive burgh song schools from 1579. He rebuilt the Chapel Royal at Stirling in 1594 for the state occasions of the baptism of his son Henry. He followed the tradition of employing lutenists for his private entertainment, as did other members of his family. When he went south to take the throne of England in 1603 as James I, he removed one of the major sources of patronage in Scotland. Beginning to fall into disrepair, the Scottish Chapel Royal was now used only for occasional state visits, leaving the court in Westminster as the only major source of royal musical patronage.

== Decline and influence ==
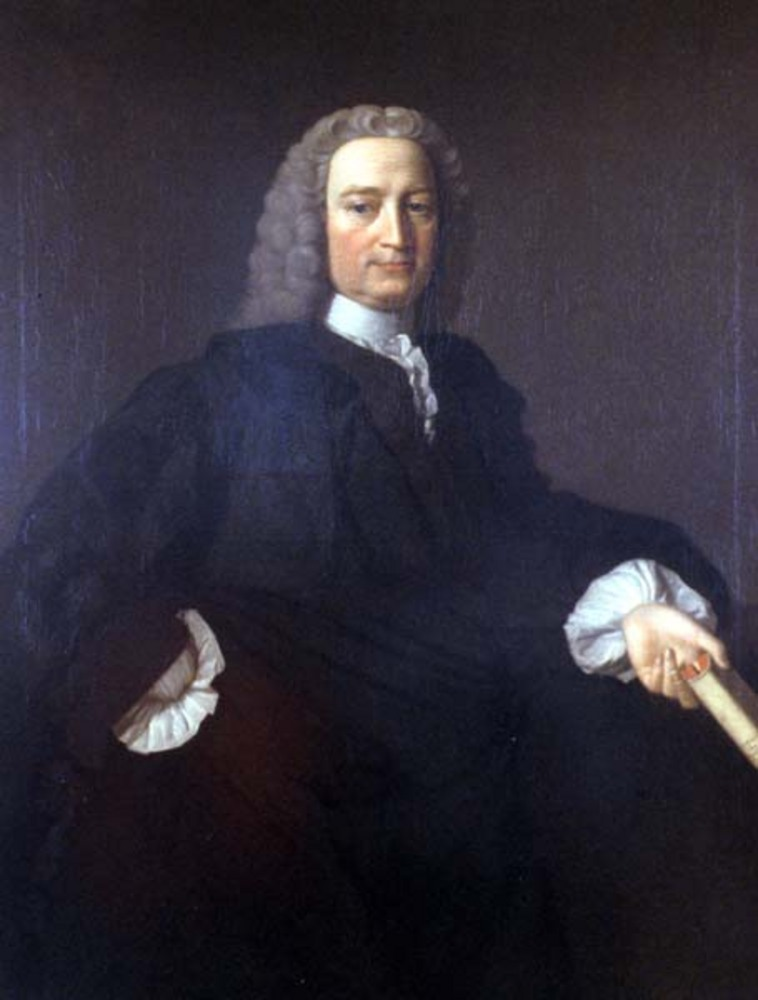
Francis Hutcheson (1694–1746), a major figure in the Scottish Enlightenment, product of the Scottish university system and humanist tradition that had their origins in the Renaissance

The Renaissance in Scotland has been seen as reaching its peak in the first half of the sixteenth century, between the reigns of James IV and the deposition of Mary, Queen of Scots. The loss of the church as a source of patronage in the 1560s and the court in 1603, changed and limited the further development of Renaissance ideas. In the same period civic humanism began to give way to private devotion and retreat from the world influenced by Stoicism. In art and architecture, Renaissance proportion began to give way to Mannerism and the more exaggerated style of the Baroque from about 1620.

The legacy of the Renaissance can be seen in the transformation of the ruling elite in Scottish society from a warrior caste to one with more refined morals and values. Humanism created an acceptance of the importance of learning, which contributed to the legacy of the Scottish school and university systems. Specifically, the 1496 Education Act has been seen as establishing a precedent for a public system of education, which was taken up by the reformers in 1560 and informed later legislation and expansion. The establishment of the Scottish universities, and especially the humanist reforms associated with Melville, allowed Scotland to participate in the "educational revolution" of the early modern era and would be vital to the development of the Enlightenment in Scotland. These circumstances have been seen by David McCrone as making education "vital to the sense of Scottishness".

The Renaissance left a legacy across intellectual fields including poetry, historical writing and architecture, which continued into the seventeenth and eighteenth centuries. A growing number of Scottish scholars emerged who had an increasing confidence in their own literature. Part of the explanation for the sudden flowering of the Scottish Enlightenment, is that the country already had a history of achievements in philosophy, poetry, music, mathematics and architecture and was in close touch with intellectual trends in the rest of Europe. From this period Scotland would make major contributions in the fields of medicine, law, philosophy, geology and history. Among these ideas the limitation of royal sovereignty over the people remained present in Scottish intellectual life and resurfaced to contribute to the major debates of the eighteenth century.

== See also ==
- Renaissance architecture in Scotland
- Early Renaissance
- Late Renaissance

== Bibliography ==
- Allan, D., Virtue, Learning and the Scottish Enlightenment: Ideas of Scholarship in Early Modern History (Edinburgh: Edinburgh University Press, 1993), ISBN 0-7486-0438-3.
- Anderson, R., "The history of Scottish Education pre-1980", in T. G. K. Bryce and W. M. Humes, eds, Scottish Education: Post-Devolution (Edinburgh: Edinburgh University Press, 2nd edn., 2003), ISBN 0-7486-1625-X.
- Bawcutt, P. J., and Williams, J. H., A Companion to Medieval Scottish Poetry (Woodbridge: Brewer, 2006), ISBN 1-84384-096-0.
- Bath, Michael, Renaissance Decorative Painting in Scotland (Edinburgh: NMS, 2003), ISBN 1-901663-60-4
- Brown, I., Owen Clancy, T., Pittock, M., Manning, A., eds, The Edinburgh History of Scottish Literature: From Columba to the Union, until 1707 (Edinburgh: Edinburgh University Press, 2007), ISBN 0-7486-1615-2.
- Brown, K. M., Noble Society in Scotland: Wealth, Family and Culture from the Reformation to the Revolutions (Edinburgh: Edinburgh University Press, 2004), ISBN 0-7486-1299-8.≠
- Caldwell, D. H., ed., Angels, Nobles and Unicorns: Art and Patronage in Medieval Scotland (Edinburgh: National Museum of Scotland, 1982), ISBN 0-9503117-1-5.
- Carter, T., and Butt, J., The Cambridge History of Seventeenth-Century Music (Cambridge: Cambridge University Press, 2005), ISBN 0-521-79273-8.
- Clark, M. M., Education in Scotland: Policy and Practice from Pre-School to Secondary (London: Psychology Press, 1997), ISBN 0-415-15835-4.
- Cowan, I. B., and Shaw, D., ed., Renaissance and Reformation in Scotland (Edinburgh: Scottish Academic Press, 1983), ISBN 0-7073-0261-7
- Davidson, N., The Origins Of Scottish Nationhood (London: Pluto Press, 2000), ISBN 0-7453-1608-5
- Dawson, J. E. A., Scotland Re-Formed, 1488–1587 (Edinburgh: Edinburgh University Press, 2007), ISBN 0-7486-1455-9.
- Dunbar, J., The Stirling Heads (RCAHMS/HMSO, 1975), ISBN 0-11-491310-2.
- Dunbar, J., Scottish Royal Palaces (East Linton: Tuckwell Press, 1999), ISBN 1-86232-042-X
- Elliott, K., and Rimmer, F., A History of Scottish Music (London: British Broadcasting Corporation, 1973), ISBN 0-563-12192-0.
- Field, J., 'Dressing a Queen: The Wardrobe of Anna of Denmark at the Scottish Court of King James VI, 1590–1603', The Court Historian, 24:2 (2019), pp. 152–167.
- Frazer, A., Mary Queen of Scots (London: Book Club Associates, 1969).
- Geyer-Kordesch, J., ed., Physicians and Surgeons in Glasgow: The History of the Royal College of Physicians and Surgeons of Glasgow, 1599–1858, Volume 1 (London: Continuum, 1999), ISBN 1-85285-186-4.
- Glendinning, M., MacInnes, R., and MacKechnie, A., A History of Scottish Architecture: From the Renaissance to the Present Day (Edinburgh: Edinburgh University Press, 1996), ISBN 0-7486-0849-4
- Gosman, M., MacDonald, A. A., Vanderjagt, A. J. and Vanderjagt, A., Princes and Princely Culture, 1450–1650 (Leiden: Brill, 2003), ISBN 90-04-13690-8.
- Grant, A., Independence and Nationhood, Scotland 1306–1469 (Baltimore: Edward Arnold, 1984), ISBN 0-7486-0273-9.
- Harrison, J. G., Rebirth of a Palace: Royal Court at Stirling Castle (Edinburgh: Historic Scotland, 2011), ISBN 978-1-84917-055-0
- Higgins, J., 'Scotland's Stewart Monarchs. A Free Translation of Works by Hector Boece / John Bellenden and Robert Lindsay of Pitscottie' (2020).
- Hinds, K., Everyday Life in the Renaissance (London: Marshall Cavendish, 2009), ISBN 0-7614-4483-1.
- Houston, R. A., and Whyte, I. D., "Introduction: Scottish Society in Perspective", in R. A. Houston and I. D. Whyte, eds, Scottish Society, 1500–1800 (Cambridge: Cambridge University Press, 2005), ISBN 0-521-89167-1.
- Le Huray, P., Music and the Reformation in England, 1549–1660 (Cambridge: Cambridge University Press, 1978), ISBN 0-521-29418-5.
- Jack, R. D. S., Alexander Montgomerie (Edinburgh: Scottish Academic Press, 1985), ISBN 0-7073-0367-2.
- Jack, R. D. S., "Poetry under King James VI", in C. Cairns, ed., The History of Scottish Literature (Aberdeen: Aberdeen University Press, 1988), vol. 1, ISBN 0-08-037728-9.
- Lynch, M., Scotland: A New History (New York, NY: Random House, 2011), ISBN 1-4464-7563-8.
- Kirk, J., "'Melvillian reform' and the Scottish universities", in A. A. MacDonald and M. Lynch, eds, The Renaissance in Scotland: Studies in Literature, Religion, History, and Culture Offered to John Durkhan (Leiden: Brill, 1994), ISBN 90-04-10097-0.
- McKean, C., The Scottish Chateau (Stroud: Sutton, 2nd edn., 2004), ISBN 0-7509-3527-8.
- Mackie, J. D., Lenman, B., and Parker, G., A History of Scotland (London: Penguin, 1991), ISBN 0-14-013649-5.
- Mason, R., "Renaissance and Reformation: the sixteenth century", in J. Wormald, Scotland: A History (Oxford: Oxford University Press, 2005), ISBN 0-19-162243-5.
- Martin, J., Kingship and Love in Scottish Poetry, 1424–1540 (Aldershot: Ashgate, 2008), ISBN 0-7546-6273-X, p. 111.
- Palliser, D. M., The Cambridge Urban History of Britain: 600–1540, Volume 1 (Cambridge: Cambridge University Press, 2000), ISBN 0-521-44461-6.
- Patrick, J., Renaissance and Reformation (London: Marshall Cavendish, 2007), ISBN 0-7614-7650-4.
- Pearce, M., 'A French Furniture Maker and the 'Courtly Style' in Sixteenth-Century Scotland', Regional Furniture vol. XXXII (2018), pp. 127–36.
- Rabasa, J., Sato, M., Tortarolo, E., and Woolf, D., eds, The Oxford History of Historical Writing: Volume 3: 1400–1800 (Oxford: Oxford University Press, 2012), ISBN 0-19-921917-6.
- Reid, S., Castles and Tower Houses of the Scottish Clans, 1450–1650 (Botley: Osprey, 2006), ISBN 978-1-84176-962-2.
- Rhodes, N., "Wrapped in the Strong Arm of the Union: Shakespeare and King James" in W. Maley and A. Murphy, eds, Shakespeare and Scotland (Manchester: Manchester University Press, 2004), ISBN 0-7190-6636-0.
- Scott, P. H., The Age of Liberation (Edinburgh: The Saltire Society, 2008), ISBN 0-85411-101-8.
- Spicer, A., "Architecture", in A. Pettegree, ed., The Reformation World (London: Routledge, 2000), ISBN 0-415-16357-9.
- Spiller, M., "Poetry after the Union 1603–1660" in C. Cairns, ed., The History of Scottish Literature (Aberdeen: Aberdeen University Press, 1988), vol. 1, ISBN 0-08-037728-9.
- Spring, M., The Lute In Britain: A History Of The Instrument And Its Music (Oxford: Oxford University Press, 2006), ISBN 0-19-518838-1.
- Summerson, J., Architecture in Britain, 1530 to 1830 (New Haven, CT: Yale University Press, 9th edn., 1993), ISBN 0-300-05886-1.
- Thomas, A. "The Renaissance", in T. M. Devine and J. Wormald, The Oxford Handbook of Modern Scottish History (Oxford: Oxford University Press, 2012), ISBN 0-19-162433-0.
- Thomson, T., ed., Auchinleck Chronicle (Edinburgh, 1819).
- Tittler, R., "Portrait, politics and society", in R. Tittler and N. Jones, eds, A Companion to Tudor Britain (Hoboken, NJ: John Wiley & Sons, 2008), ISBN 1-4051-3740-1.
- Todd, M., The Culture of Protestantism in Early Modern Scotland (New Haven, CT: Yale University Press, 2002), ISBN 0-300-09234-2.
- Toy, S., Castles: Their Construction and History (New York: Dover Publications, 1985), ISBN 978-0-486-24898-1.
- Webster, B., Medieval Scotland: the Making of an Identity (New York, NY: St. Martin's Press, 1997), ISBN 0-333-56761-7
- Wormald, J., Court, Kirk, and Community: Scotland, 1470–1625 (Edinburgh: Edinburgh University Press, 1991), ISBN 0-7486-0276-3.
