= Peter Wedderburn =

Peter Wedderburn may refer to:

- Sir Peter Wedderburn, Lord Gosford (1616?–1679), Scottish judge
- Peter Wedderburn, Lord Chesterhall (c. 1700–1756), Scottish lawyer
