= John Wedderburn =

John Wedderburn may refer to:

- John Wedderburn (poet) (died 1556), Scottish poet and theologian
- John Wedderburn (physician) (1599–1679), Scottish physician
- Sir John Wedderburn of Ballindean (1729–1803), Scottish landowner and planter
- Sir John Wedderburn, 5th Baronet of Blackness (1704–1746), joined the 1745 rebellion of Charles Edward Stuart
