= Scottish society =

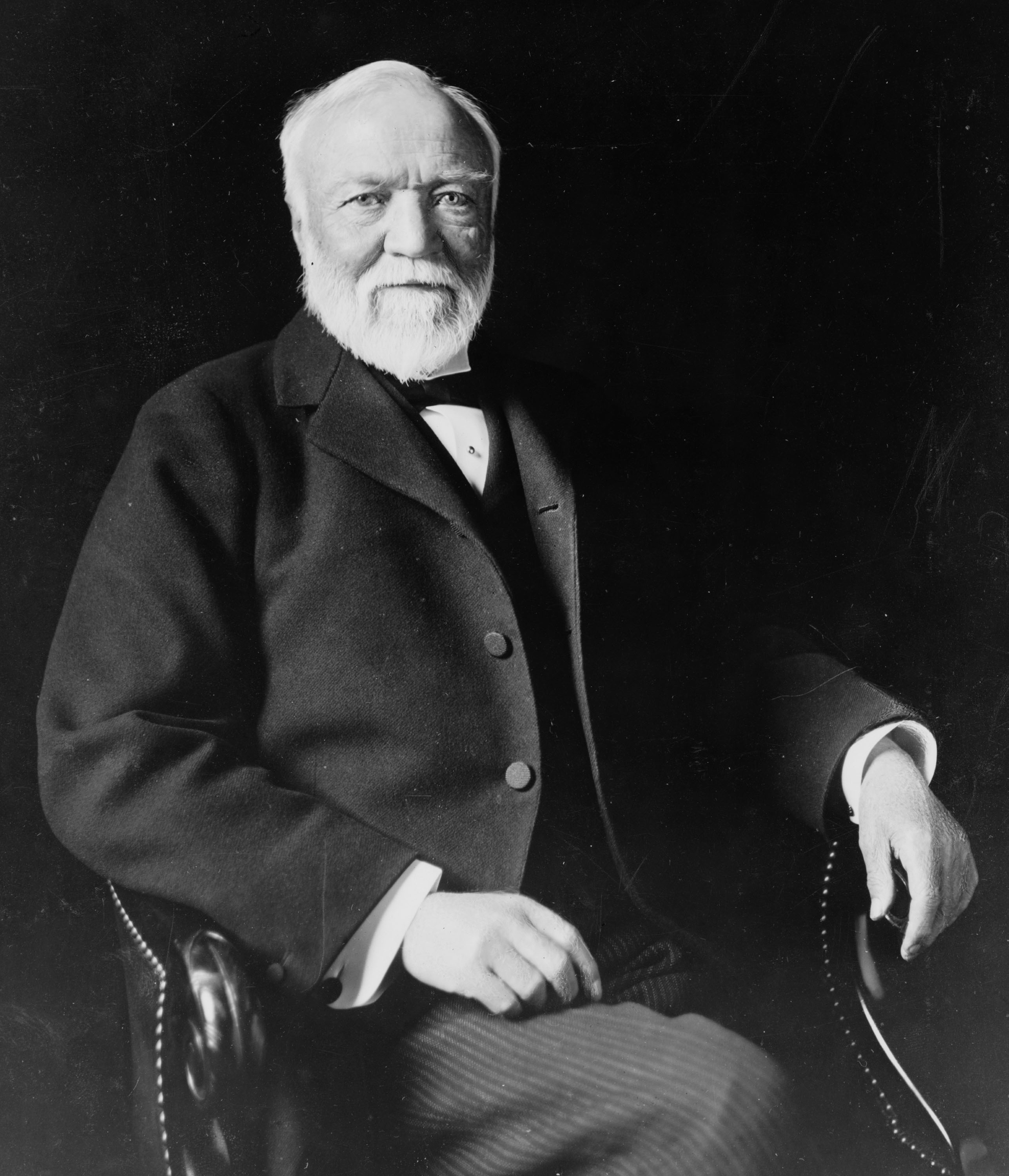
Scotland has a deep-rooted pattern of philanthropic behaviour, personified by the likes of Andrew Carnegie. His donations to the higher education sector contributed to the modern development of the Scottish universities.

Scottish society is the group behaviour of Scots, how they organise themselves and make decisions. The social history of Scotland is a major field within the academic study of Scottish history.

Scottish society is based on Western society, and has made key contributions to the spread of Western culture throughout the world. It has been developing for many centuries, since Scotland started to emerge as a country in the Early Middle Ages.

Scots share many social and cultural characteristics, for example dialect, music, arts, social habits, cuisine and folklore. Scotland is an ethnically and racially diverse country as result of large-scale immigration from many different countries throughout its history.

== Scottish society in the Middle Ages ==
From the departure of the Romans from Britain in the fifth century to the establishment of the Renaissance in the early sixteenth century, Scottish society was obscurely formed and there are few documentary sources. Kinship groups provided the primary system of organisation and society was probably divided between a small aristocracy, whose rationale was based around warfare, a wider group of freemen, who had the right to bear arms and were represented in law codes, above a relatively large body of slaves, who may have lived beside and become clients of their owners.

From the twelfth century onwards there are sources that allow the stratification in society to be seen in detail, with layers including the king and a small elite of mormaers above lesser ranks of freemen and what was probably a large group of serfs, particularly in central Scotland. In this period the feudalism introduced under David I meant that baronial lordships began to overlay this system, the English terms earl and thane became widespread. Below the noble ranks were husbandmen with small farms and growing numbers of cottars and gresemen (grazing tenants) with more modest landholdings. The combination of agnatic kinship and feudal obligations has been seen as creating the system of clans in the Highlands in this era. Scottish society adopted theories of the three estates to describe its society and English terminology to differentiate ranks. Serfdom disappeared from the records in the fourteenth century and new social groups of labourers, craftsmen and merchants, became important in the developing burghs. This led to increasing social tensions in urban society, but, in contrast to England and France, there was a lack of major unrest in Scottish rural society, where there was relatively little economic change.

== Scottish society in the early modern era ==
Scottish society in the early modern era encompasses the social structure and relations that existed in Scotland between the early sixteenth century and the mid-eighteenth century. It roughly corresponds to the early modern era in Europe, beginning with the Renaissance and Reformation and ending with the last Jacobite risings and the beginnings of the Industrial Revolution.

Scotland in this period was a hierarchical society, with a complex series of ranks and orders. This was headed by the monarch and the great magnates. Below them were the lairds, who emerged as a distinct group at the top of local society was whose position was consolidated by economic and administrative change. Below the lairds in rural society were a variety of groups, often ill-defined, including yeomen, who were often major landholders, and the husbandmen, who were landholders, followed by cottars and grassmen, who often had only limited rights to common land and pasture. Urban society was led by wealthy merchants, who were often burgesses. Beneath them, and often in conflict with the urban elite, were the craftsmen. Beneath these ranks, in both urban and rural society, there were a variety of groups of mobile "masterless men", the unemployed and vagrants.

Kinship was agnatic, with descent counted only through the male line, helping to build the importance of surnames and clans. The increased power of the state and economic change eroded the power of these organisations, and this process would accelerate as the government responded to the threat of Jacobite risings by undermining the power of clan chiefs in the eighteenth century. The Reformation had a major impact on family life, changing the nature of baptism, marriage and burials, leading to a change in wider relationships, sacramental status and burial practices and placing a greater emphasis on the role of the father.

Limited demographic evidence indicates a generally expanding population, limited by short-term subsistence crises, of which the most severe was probably that of the "seven ill years" of the 1690s. The urban centres of the burghs continued to grow, with the largest being Edinburgh, followed by Glasgow. Population growth and economic dislocation from the second half of the sixteenth century led to a growing problem of vagrancy, which was responded to by a series of Acts of Parliament that established what would become the "Old Poor Law", which attempted to ensure relief for the "deserving" local poor, but punishments for the mobile unemployed and beggars. The patriarchal nature of society meant that women were directed to be subservient to their husbands and families. They remained an important part of the workforce and some were economically independent, while others lived a marginal existence. At the beginning of the period women had little or no legal status, but were increasingly criminalised after the Reformation, and were the major subjects of the witch hunts that occurred in relatively large numbers until the end of the seventeenth century.

== See also ==
- Demographic history of Scotland
- Economic history of Scotland
- History of education in Scotland
- Scottish Social Attitudes Survey
- Scottish national identity
