= John Wedderburn (physician) =

Scottish physician

- Born: 1599; Dundee
- Died: July 1679 (aged 79–80)
- Occupation: Physician

Sir John Wedderburn (1599 – July 1679) was a Scottish physician.

== Biography ==
Wedderburn was the fifth son of Alexander Wedderburn of Kingennie, town clerk of Dundee, and Helen, daughter of Alexander Ramsay of Brachmont in Fife, and was born at Dundee in 1599. He matriculated at St. Andrews University in 1615, graduated in 1618, and was professor of philosophy there in 1620–30. Having chosen the medical profession, he rapidly attained an eminent position. He was appointed physician to the king, was knighted, and obtained a pension of two thousand pounds Scots from Charles I, which was confirmed to him by Charles II. Following the example of his kinsman and namesake, brother of James Wedderburn (1585–1639), who was then a distinguished physician in Moravia, Wedderburn prosecuted his medical studies on the continent, and was with the prince (Charles II) in Holland. On 9 April 1646 he was incorporated M.D. of Oxford University, upon the recommendation of the chancellor. He acquired a large fortune, and gave so liberally to his two nephews that one, Sir Alexander Wedderburn, acquired the estate of Blackness, while the other, Sir Peter Wedderburn, bought Gosford House in East Lothian in 1659. At Gosford, Sir John lived in partial retirement from 1662 till his death in July 1679, and was probably buried in the churchyard of Aberlady. He was unmarried. By his will he bequeathed his extensive and valuable library to St. Leonard's College, St. Andrews University.

A portrait of him was in the possession of Sir William Wedderburn, at Meredith, England. It is reproduced in ‘The Wedderburn Book.’
