= Thomas Hay, Lord Huntingdon =

Scottish lawyer

Thomas Hay, Lord Huntingdon (1707–1755) was a Scottish lawyer and Senator of the College of Justice.

== Life ==
He was born in Edinburgh (or nearby Haddington) the son of Alexander Hay of Huntingdon and his wife Mary Gordon. Thomas trained in Law in Edinburgh and passed the Scottish bar as an advocate around 1730.

On 28 November 1754 he was elected a Senator of the College of Justice in place of John Pringle, Lord Haining.

After only a few months in this role he died in Edinburgh on 4 February 1755 but was buried in St Mary's Church in Haddington east of Edinburgh. His position as Senator was filled by Peter Wedderburn, Lord Chesterhall.

== Family ==
He was married to Margaret Murray daughter of Sir David Murray of Stanhope (1659-1729).They had at least 3 sons and one daughter.

Margaret (Lady Huntingdon) lived her final days at World's End Close on the Royal Mile in Edinburgh.

== Artistic recognition ==
He was portrayed in 1757. The portrait hangs in the Signet Library in Edinburgh.
