= Peter Wedderburn, Lord Chesterhall =

Scottish lawyer

The Hon Peter Wedderburn, Lord Chesterhall (c. 1700–11 August 1756) was an 18th-century Scottish lawyer who rose to be a Senator of the College of Justice.

== Life ==
He was born in Glassford (possibly at Glassford Castle) in Lanarkshire around 1700, the son of Alexander Wedderburn. His paternal grandfather was Sir Peter Wedderburn, Lord Gosford.

He is presumed to have studied law at the University of Edinburgh. He passed the Scottish bar as an advocate in February 1715. He became an Assessor in Edinburgh and then Secretary to the Excise.

He acquired the estate of Chesterhall near Gladsmuir in East Lothian. He also bought a large mansion on Elphinston.

He became a Senator of the College of Justice in the summer of 1755, replacing Thomas Hay, Lord Huntingdon.

He died at Chesterhall on 11 August 1756. He is thought to be buried nearby in Gladsmuir churchyard.

His place as Senator was filled by George Brown, Lord Coalstoun.

== Family ==
He was married to Janet Ogilvy. Their children included Janet Wedderburn later Janet Erskine, Alexander Wedderburn, 1st Earl of Rosslyn, Lord Chancellor of Great Britain, and Colonel David Wedderburn.

He was cousin to Sir Peter Halkett, 2nd Baronet.
