= William Stewart (makar) =

Scottish poet (c.1476–c.1548)

William Stewart (c. 1476 – c. 1548) was a Scottish poet working in the first half of the 16th century.

== Life ==
William Stewart was great-grandson of one of the illegitimate sons of Alexander Stewart, Earl of Buchan. He was educated like his namesake William Stewart (1479–1545), the future bishop of Aberdeen, at the University of St Andrews. Destined for the church, he later became a courtier. In 1527 he held a pension from James V of Scotland, and the last payment (of £40) was recorded in the accounts of 1541. He died before 1560.

== Works ==
Stewart wrote a number of advice poems for the young James V of Scotland, and a verse translation of Hector Boece's Latin History of Scotland. He was the poet mentioned twice in David Lindsay of the Mount's Complaynt of the Papingo. Stewart was also mentioned by John Rolland in his prologue to the Seven Sages. There were two students with this name at St Andrews University at the same time, giving rise to possible confusions of identity; in the Buik of Chronicles, Stewart said he was a student there for 14 years. Although it has usually been assumed the poet and minor courtier Stewart wrote both the translation and the court poems, the critic Matthew McDiarmid attributed the translation to the other William Stewart, the bishop.

=== Court poetry ===
Some of Stewart's surviving poems describe life in the Stewart court, or offer advice to the young King James V. Some poems play on the frustration felt by courtiers hoping for royal favour and reward. This stanza is from First Lerges, (largesse) referring to New Year's Day gifts expected from James V and from his late mother Margaret Tudor;

The thesaur and compttrollar,
Thay bade me cum I wait nocht quhair,
And thay suld gar I wait nocht quhay,
Gif me I wat nocht quhat full fair,
For lerges of this new yeirday,
* * * * * *
The Treasurer and Comptroller
They call me come: I know not where,
And they would do: I know not why/who,
Give me I know not what, full fair,
For largesse of this New Year's Day.

=== Translation of Boece ===
A metrical version of the Latin history of Scotland Hector Boece was commissioned by James V or his mother Margaret Tudor. The work had been published in Latin at Paris in 1527 as the Historia Gentis Scotorum (History of the Scottish People). James V requested John Bellenden to translate it into Scots prose and Stewart into Scots verse. Bellenden's version appeared in 1536, but Stewart's, which was begun in 1531, remained in manuscript until 1858, when it was published in the Rolls Series; it was edited by William Barclay Turnbull from a unique manuscript which, after being in the possession of Hew Craufurd of Cloverhill, Bishop John Moore, and George I, went to Cambridge University Library. Stewart shows an acquaintance with the works of John Mair, Jean Froissart, and John of Fordun. In parts he amplified the original.

He supplied a prologue, and there his narrator, Discretion's cousin, explains that the English destroyed all the written historical records of Scotland they could find during the Wars of Independence in the time of William Wallace. She says that scraps of books, loose pages, and memories had been recovered after preservation at Iona Abbey and bound together to form Boece's source material;

Our auld storeis befoir thir mony yeir, (thir = these)
Thai war distroyit all with Inglismen,
In Wallace weir as it eith to ken; (weir = war)
Syne efterwart, quhen that thai wreit the storie,
Auld eldaris deidis to put into memorie,
Tha maid thair buikis, thair tractatis, and thair tabillis,
Part by gues, and part be fenyeit fabillis;
Part tha fand in ald broades of bukkis,
Part in lous quarris lyand wer in nukkis, (lous quarris = loose pages)
* * * * * *
Ane abbay sumtyme of authoritie,
In Iona yle within the occident se,
And in that place thair wes thir storeis fund,
Sum in lowss quarris and uther sum weill bund.
