= Sir Alexander Wedderburn =

Scottish politician

- Born: 1610
- Died: 18 November 1676 (aged 65–66)
- Occupation: Politician

Sir Alexander Wedderburn (1610 – 18 November 1676) was a Scottish politician.

== Biography ==
Wedderburn of Blackness, Forfarshire, eldest son of James Wedderburn, town clerk of Dundee, by Margaret, daughter of James Goldman, also a Dundee merchant, was born in 1610. Sir Peter Wedderburn was his younger brother. Alexander was educated for the law and passed advocate; but upon the death of his uncle Alexander of Kingennie, whose son was then a minor, he was in 1633 appointed town clerk of Dundee, and held the office till 1675. For his steadfast loyalty he obtained from Charles I in 1639 a tack of the customs of Dundee, and in 1640 a pension of 100l. per annum out of the customs. In September of the same year he was appointed one of the eight Scots commissioners to arrange the treaty of Ripon. In October following he had an exoneration and ratification from the king, and in 1642 a knighthood was conferred on him. He represented Dundee in the Scottish parliament, 1644–7 and 1648–51 (Return of Members of Parliament), and he served on numerous committees of the estates. At the Restoration in 1661 he was appointed one of the commissioners for regulating weights and measures; and on 10 February 1664 he received from Charles II a pension of 100l. sterling. He died on 18 November 1676. By Matilda, daughter of Sir Andrew Fletcher of Innerpeffer, he had five sons and six daughters. His second son, James (1649–1696), was grandfather of Sir John Wedderburn (1704–1746).
