= James Wedderburn (poet) =

Scottish poet (c. 1495–1553)

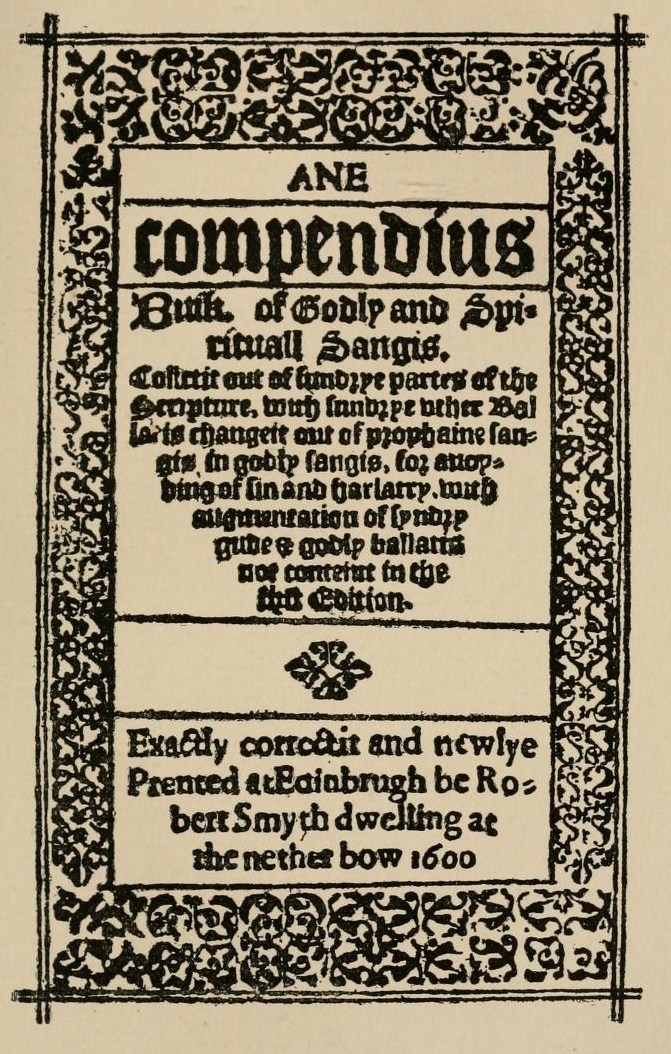
Reprint of The Gude and Godlie Ballatis from 1600

James Wedderburn (c. 1495 – 1553) was a Scottish poet and playwright, the eldest son of James Wedderburn, merchant of Dundee (described in documents as "at the West Kirk Style" to distinguish him from others of the name), and of Janet Barry, sister of John Barry, vicar of Dundee. He was born in Dundee about 1495, and matriculated at St Andrews University in 1514.

He was enrolled as a burgess of Dundee in 1517, and was intended to take up his father's occupation as a merchant. While at St. Leonard's College, St. Andrews, he had come under the influence of Gavin Logie, one of the leading reformers, and he afterwards took an active part against Romanism. After leaving the university he was sent to Dieppe and Rouen, where it is probable that a branch of the Wedderburn family was settled in commerce.

Returning to Dundee, he wrote two plays—a tragedy on the beheading of John the Baptist, and a comedy called Dionysius the Tyrant—in which he satirised the abuses in the Roman church. These plays were performed in the open air at the Playfield, near the west port of Dundee, in 1539–40; but they have not been preserved, though from references made to them by David Calderwood and others they seem to have given offence to leading local ecclesiastics.

About this time, in conjunction with his brothers John Wedderburn and Robert Wedderburn, he wrote a number of sacred parodies on popular ballads, which were published apparently at first as broadsheet ballads, and were afterwards collected and issued in 1567, under the title Ane Compendious Booke of Godly and Spirituall Songs collected out of sundrie partes of the Scripture, with sundrie of other Ballates changed out of prophaine sanges, for avoyding of sinne and harlotrie, with augmentation of sundrie gude and godlie Ballates not contenit in the first editioun. Only one copy of the edition of 1567 is known to exist, and there is no clue to the date of the first edition referred to on its title-page. As some of the songs plainly refer to incidents that took place in Scotland about 1540, the theory that these were circulated as broadsheets is not unreasonable.

According to Calderwood, James Wedderburn "counter-footed the conjuring of a ghost" in a drama, which seemed to reflect upon James V, whose confessor, Father Laing, had scandalised the king by some mummery of this kind. Possibly this was the cause that action was taken against Wedderburn as a heretic, for in 1539 he was "delated to the king, and letters of caption directed against him", but he managed to escape to France, returning to Dieppe or Rouen and resuming his commercial occupation.

An unsuccessful attempt was made by the Scottish factors there to have him prosecuted by the bishop of Rouen, and he remained in France until his death in 1553, not 1565, as sometimes stated. The date is proved by the return of his son John as heir to his father in October 1553. Wedderburn married before 1528 Janet, daughter of David Forrester in Nevay, by whom he had three sons; of these John (died November 1569) was grandfather of James Wedderburn, bishop of Dunblane.
