= Sir Peter Wedderburn, Lord Gosford =

Scottish judge

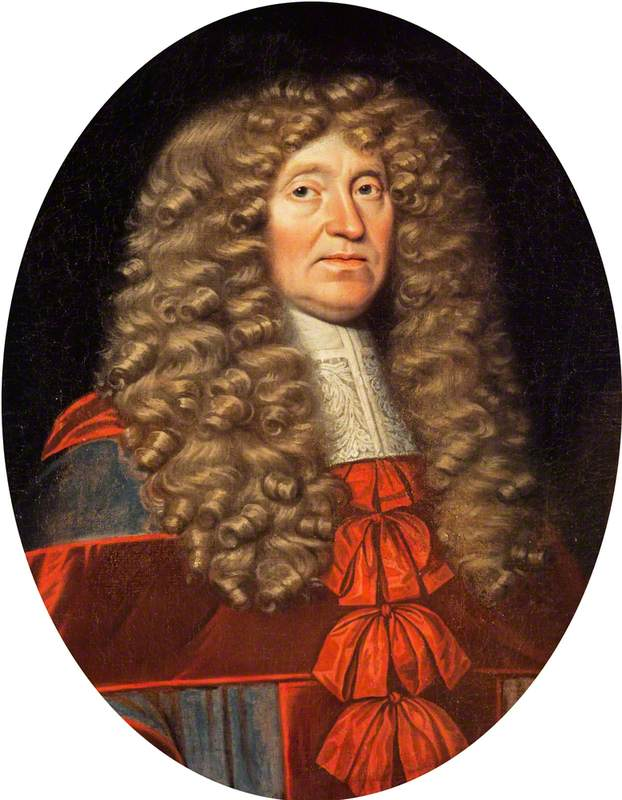
- Born: 1616? Dundee
- Died: 11 November 1679
- Occupation: Judge

Sir Peter Wedderburn, Lord Gosford (1616? – 11 November 1679) was a Scottish judge.

== Biography ==
Wedderburn was the third son of James Wedderburn, town clerk of Dundee. Sir Alexander Wedderburn was his elder brother. He was born at Dundee about 1616, and was educated at St. Andrews, where he graduated M.A. in 1636. He was admitted advocate on 19 January 1642, and speedily attained prominence at the bar.

In January 1658–9 he acquired the estate of Gosford House, Haddingtonshire, from Sir Alexander Auchmuty, not, as is stated in Douglas's ‘Baronage,’ from his uncle, Sir John Wedderburn, who advanced money for the purpose as he had no children and had decided to make Peter his heir.

Wedderburn remained firmly attached to the royalists during the civil war; and at the Restoration he was knighted and made keeper of the signet for life, with power to appoint deputies. In July 1661 he was appointed clerk to the privy council, and on 17 June 1668 he was raised to the bench as an ordinary lord of session, with the title of Lord Gosford. He represented the constabulary of Haddington in the conventions almost continuously from 1661 until 1674.

He died at Gosford on 11 November 1679. He married, first, in 1649, Christian Gibson, by whom he had one son, who died in infancy; and secondly, in 1653, Agnes, daughter of John Dickson, Lord Hartree of session, and had five sons and four daughters. The second son, Peter (1658–1746), assumed the name of Halkett on marrying Jane, daughter of Sir Charles Halkett, and heiress of her brother, Sir James Halkett; he is represented by Sir Peter Arthur Halkett of Pitfirrane, bart. Sir Peter Wedderburn's third son was grandfather of Alexander Wedderburn, first earl of Rosslyn. Lord Gosford published ‘A Collection of Decisions of the Court of Session from 1 June 1668 till July 1677,’ which is still accepted as authoritative. He was regarded as an eloquent advocate and an upright judge, ‘whose deeds were prompted by truthfulness, and whose law was directed by justice and sympathy.’

A portrait of Sir Peter was in the possession of Sir William Wedderburn at Meredith, England, and is reproduced in ‘The Wedderburn Book.’ Another portrait was at Leslie House, and was sold in 1886.
