= Robert Wedderburn (poet) =

Robert Wedderburn (ca. 1510 – between 1555 and 1560), the third son of James Wedderburn and Janet Barrie, was born in Dundee, and attended St Andrews University. Having entered St Leonard's College in 1526 he graduated BA in 1529 and MA in 1530, with his name listed at the head of the roll of graduates. In 1528 he was granted the reversion of St Katherine's Chapel in Dundee, despite being under age.

In the mid-1530s he came under suspicion of heresy and fled to Paris, where he attended the university. He may also have spent some time with his brother John Wedderburn at Wittenberg in the 1540s, a suggestion given credence by the fact that on his return journey to Scotland in 1546 he embarked at Frankfurt an der Oder. Crawford relates that when Robert was journeying back to Scotland and his ship had put in on the coast of Norway, a dispute arose between the Roman Catholic and Protestant passengers, which led Robert and his fellow reformers to burn Cardinal David Beaton in effigy. Beaton was assassinated in St Andrews that same day.

In conjunction with his brothers James and John, he wrote a number of sacred parodies on popular ballads, which were published apparently at first as broadsheet ballads, and were afterwards collected and issued in 1567, under the title Ane Compendious Booke of Godly and Spirituall Songs collected out of sundrie partes of the Scripture, with sundrie of other Ballates changed out of prophaine sanges, for avoyding of sinne and harlotrie, with augmentation of sundrie gude and godlie Ballates not contenit in the first editioun. Only one copy of the edition of 1567 is known to exist, and there is no clue to the date of the first edition referred to on its title-page. As some of the songs plainly refer to incidents that took place in Scotland about 1540, the theory that these were circulated as broadsheets is not unreasonable.

Robert succeeded his uncle, John Barry, as vicar of Dundee in 1546. He remained in this post until his death, in Dundee, some time between 1555 and 1560. With Isobel Lovell he had two illegitimate sons, David and Robert, who were declared legitimate in 1552–3. Isobel Lovell married David Cant in 1560 and had died by 1587. It has been suggested that Robert Wedderburn was the author of The Complaynt of Scotland (1549), and, although that work's positive attitudes towards the established church made it seem unlikely to some that the ascription was accurate, the editor of the 1979 Scottish Text Society edition of the work and the National Library of Scotland support the Wedderburn attribution.
