= Husbandman =

Free tenant farmer or a small landowner in the Middle Ages

A husbandman in England in the Middle Ages and the early modern period was a small landowner. The social status of a husbandman was below that of a yeoman. The meaning of "husband" in this term is "master of house" rather than "married man". According to anthropologist Charles Partridge, in England "Husbandman is a term denoting not rank but occupation... Knights, esquires, gentlemen and yeomen were also husbandmen if occupied in agriculture, but were never styled husbandmen because of their right to be styled knights, etc. The agriculturist who had no right to be styled knight or esquire or gentleman, and who, not being a forty-shilling freeholder was not a yeoman, was described as husbandman."

It has also been used to mean a practitioner of animal husbandry, or in American English, a rancher.

== Origin and etymology ==
The term husband refers to Middle English huseband, from Old English hūsbōnda, from Old Norse hūsbōndi (hūs, "house" + bōndi, būandi, present participle of būa, "to dwell", so, etymologically, "a householder"). The origin is the verb ‘to husband’ which originally meant ‘till’ or ‘cultivate’.
