= John Wedderburn (poet) =

Scottish poet and theologian (ca. 1500–1556)

John Wedderburn (ca. 1500 – 1556) was a Scottish poet and theologian.

== Life ==
The second son of James Wedderburn and Janet Barry, he was born in Dundee about 1500. He studied at the pædagogium (afterwards St Mary's College), St Andrews, graduated B.A. in 1526 and M.A. in 1528. While at college he came under the teaching of John Mair (1469–1550) and Patrick Hamilton the martyr, and, like his elder brother, became an ardent reformer. Returning to Dundee, he was placed under the tuition of Friar Hewat of the Dominican monastery there, and he took orders as a priest. He was chaplain of St Matthew's Chapel, Dundee, in 1532.

Having the gift of poetry, he joined with his two brothers, James and Robert, in composing ballads directed against Roman Catholicism, and in 1538–9 he was accused of heresy. They wrote a number of sacred parodies on popular ballads, which were published apparently at first as broadsheet ballads, and were afterwards collected and issued in 1567, under the title Ane Compendious Booke of Godly and Spirituall Songs collected out of sundrie partes of the Scripture, with sundrie of other Ballates changed out of prophaine sanges, for avoyding of sinne and harlotrie, with augmentation of sundrie gude and godlie Ballates not contenit in the first editioun. Only one copy of the edition of 1567 is known to exist, and there is no clue to the date of the first edition referred to on its title-page. As some of the songs plainly refer to incidents that took place in Scotland about 1540, the theory that these were circulated as broadsheets is not unreasonable.

It is not known whether he stood his trial, but he was certainly convicted and his goods forfeited and given over to his youngest brother Henry, on payment of a small sum to the king's treasury. About 1540 Wedderburn made his way to the continent, and remained some time at Wittenberg, then the chief centre of the reformers. In 1542 he returned to Scotland, and, in conjunction with John Scott or Scot (fl. 1550), printer in Dundee, began publishing the ballads which he and his two brothers had composed against the Roman Church.

That he had the largest share in writing these ballads seems probable from the fact that many of them are framed on German models with which he would be familiar. It was expected, after the death of James V, that the governor Arran would be favourable to the Protestants, but this hope was not realised, and several Acts of Parliament were passed forbidding the publication of these ballads, which were known as "the Dundee Psalms".

Wedderburn was in Dundee in the early part of 1546, but was forced to flee to England in that year to avoid prosecution, and he died there in exile in 1556.
