= Music in Medieval Scotland =

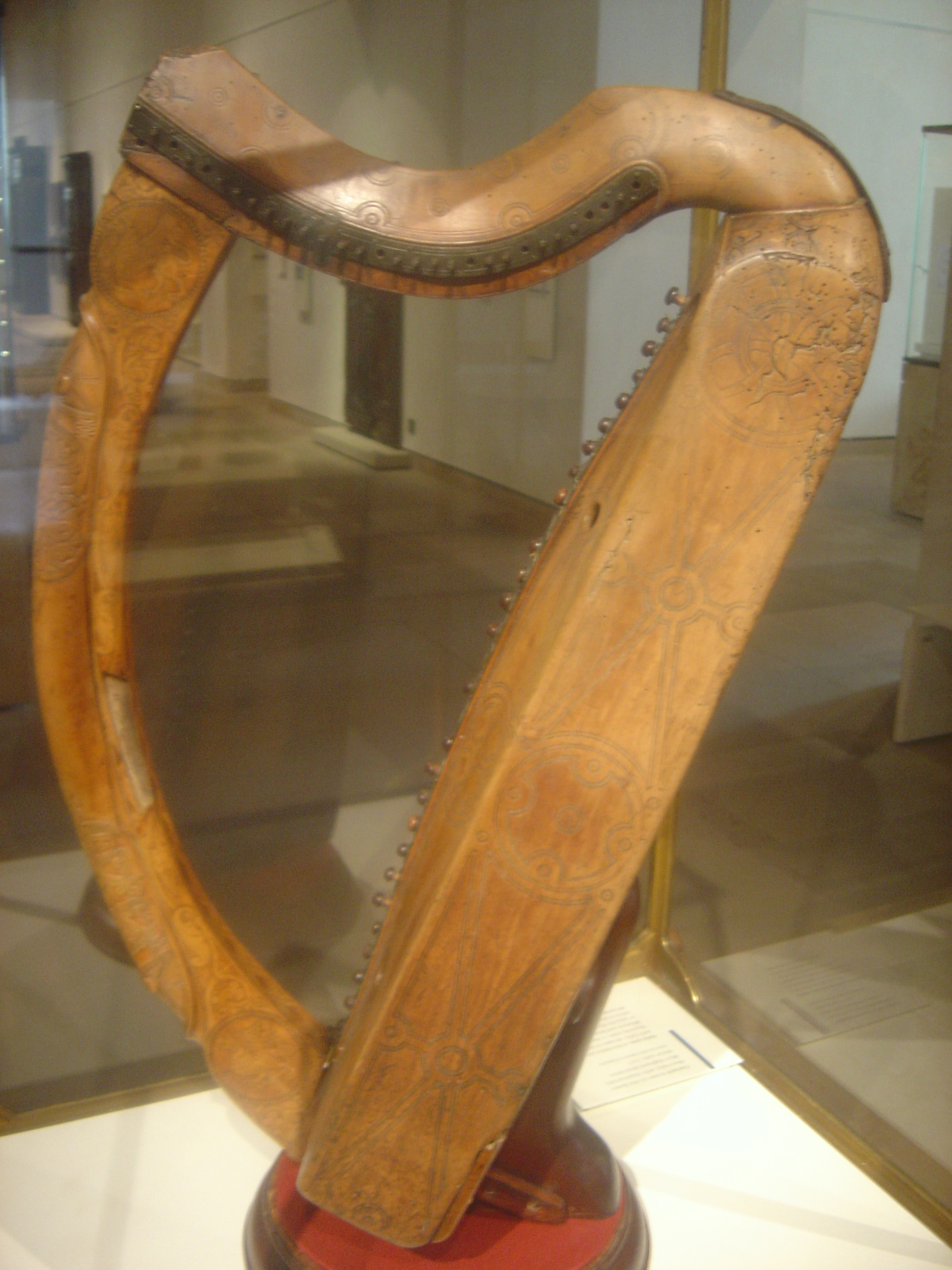
The Queen Mary Harp, preserved in the National Museum of Scotland, Edinburgh

Music in Medieval Scotland includes all forms of musical production in what is now Scotland between the fifth century and the adoption of the Renaissance in the early sixteenth century. The sources for Scottish Medieval music are extremely limited. There are no major musical manuscripts for Scotland from before the twelfth century. There are occasional indications that there was a flourishing musical culture. Instruments included the cithara, tympanum, and chorus. Visual representations and written sources demonstrate the existence of harps in the Early Middle Ages and bagpipes and pipe organs in the Late Middle Ages. As in Ireland, there were probably filidh in Scotland, who acted as poets, musicians and historians. After this "de-gallicisation" of the Scottish court in the twelfth century, a less highly regarded order of bards took over the functions of the filidh and they would continue to act in a similar role in the Scottish Highlands and Islands into the eighteenth century.

In the Early Middle Ages there was a distinct form of liturgical Celtic chant. It is thought to have been superseded from the eleventh century, as elsewhere in Europe, by the more complex Gregorian chant. The English Sarum Use was the basis for most surviving chant in Scotland. From the thirteenth century, Scottish church music was increasingly influenced by continental developments. Monophony was replaced from the fourteenth century by the Ars Nova, a movement that developed in France and then Italy, replacing the restrictive styles of Gregorian plainchant with complex polyphony. Survivals of works from the first half of the sixteenth century indicate the quality and scope of music that was undertaken at the end of the medieval period. In the High Middle Ages, the need for large numbers of singing priests to fulfill these obligations led to the foundation of a system of song schools. The proliferation of collegiate churches and requiem masses in the Late Middle Ages would have necessitated the training of large numbers of choristers, marking a considerable expansion of the song school system. A stress was placed on the technique of Faburden, which allowed easy harmonisation according to strict rules.

The captivity of James I in England from 1406 to 1423, where he earned a reputation as a poet and composer, may have led him to take English and continental styles and musicians back to the Scottish court on his release. James III founded a Chapel Royal at Restalrig near Holyrood and his son James IV refounded the Chapel Royal within Stirling Castle, with a new and enlarged choir. James IV was said to be constantly accompanied by music, but very little surviving secular music can be unequivocally attributed to his court.

There is evidence that there was a flourishing culture of popular music in Scotland during the Late Middle Ages, but the only song with a melody to survive from this period is the "Pleugh Song". Some surviving Scottish ballads may date back to the Late Middle Ages and deal with events and people that can be traced back as far as the thirteenth century. They remained an oral tradition until they were collected as folk songs in the eighteenth century.

== Sources ==
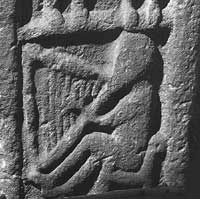
The harper on the Monifeith Pictish Stone, 700 – 900 AD

The sources for Scottish Medieval music are extremely limited. These limitations are the result of factors including a turbulent political history, the destructive practices of the Scottish Reformation, the climate and relatively late arrival of music printing. What survives are occasional indications that there was a flourishing musical culture. There are no major musical manuscripts for Scotland from before the twelfth century. Neither does Scottish music have an equivalent of the Bannatyne Manuscript in poetry, giving a large and representative sample of medieval work. The oldest extant piece of Church music written in Scotland is in the Inchcolm Fragment. Musicologist John Purser has suggested that the services dedicated to St. Columba in this manuscript and the similar service in the Sprouston Breviary, dedicated to St. Kentigern, may preserve some of this earlier tradition of plain chant. Other early manuscripts include the Dunkeld Music Book and the Scone Antiphoner. The most important collection is the mid-thirteenth century Wolfenbüttel 677 or W1 manuscript, which survives only because it was appropriated from St Andrews Cathedral Priory and taken to the continent in the 1550s. Other sources include occasional written references in accounts and in literature and visual representations of musicians and instruments.

== Instruments ==
In the late twelfth century, Giraldus Cambrensis noted that "Ireland uses and delights in two instruments: the cithara and the tympanum; Scotland three: the cithara, tympanum and chorus; Wales three: cithara, tibiae and chorus." The chithara is probably the clarsach or Celtic harp and the typanum probably a string instrument rather than a form of drum. The identity of the chorus is debated. It has been suggested that the chorus is an early form of bagpipe, but John Bannerman suggested that this was the Crwth or Crowd, a stringed instrument similar to a lyre and played with a bow, which is mentioned in later Scots poetry and English minstrel lists. Giraldus Cambrensis also notes that these instruments used steel strings, rather than cat gut, but exactly to which instruments he refers is unclear. Stone carvings indicate the instruments known in Scotland, including the harpists on the early Medieval Monifeith Pictish stone and the Dupplin Cross. Two of the three surviving Medieval Celtic harps are from Scotland: the Lamont Harp, dated to about 1500 and the highly elaborate Queen Mary Harp, from around 1450. From the late Middle Ages there is a gargoyle of a pig playing the bagpipes at Melrose Abbey and the carving of an angel playing bagpipes at Rosslyn Chapel. There are literary references in Scotland to the fiddle, often called the fethill, fedhill or rybid. In the Late Middle Ages several churches acquired pipe organs.

== Gaelic musicians ==
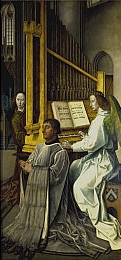
Detail from the "Trinity Altarpiece" by Hugo van der Goes, showing Sir Edward Bonkil, first Provost of Trinity College, Edinburgh, with an angel playing a pipe organ

Giraldus Cambrensis noted that "Scotland and Wales, the latter by grafting the former by intercourse and kinship, strive to emulate Ireland in the practice of music". Early Medieval Scotland and Ireland shared a common culture and language, that although reduced in significance from the High Middle Ages, both persisted in the society of the north and west. There are much fuller historical sources for early Medieval Ireland, which suggest that there would have been filidh in Scotland, who acted as poets, musicians and historians, often attached to the court of a lord or king, and passed on their knowledge and culture in Gaelic to the next generation. At least from the accession of David I (r. 1124–53), as part of a Davidian Revolution that introduced French culture and political systems, Gaelic ceased to be the main language of the royal court and was probably replaced by French. After this "de-gallicisation" of the Scottish court, a less highly regarded order of bards took over the functions of the filidh and they would continue to act in a similar role in the Highlands and Islands into the eighteenth century. They often trained in bardic schools, of which a few, like the one run by the MacMhuirich dynasty, who were bards to the Lord of the Isles, existed in Scotland and a larger number in Ireland, until they were suppressed from the seventeenth century. Members of bardic schools were trained in the complex rules and forms of Gaelic poetry. They probably accompanied their poetry on the harp. Much of their work was never written down and what survives was only recorded from the sixteenth century.

== Church music ==
In the early Middle Ages, ecclesiastical music was dominated by monophonic plainchant. The development of British Christianity, separate from the direct influence of Rome until the eighth century, with its flourishing monastic culture, led to the development of a distinct form of liturgical Celtic chant. Although no notations of this music survive, later sources suggest distinctive melodic patterns. Celtic chant is thought have been superseded from the eleventh century, as elsewhere in Europe, by more complex Gregorian chant. The version of this chant linked to the liturgy as used in the Diocese of Salisbury, the Sarum Use, first recorded from the thirteenth century, became dominant in England and was the basis for most surviving chant in Scotland. It was closely related to Gregorian chant, but it was more elaborate and with some unique local features. The Sarum rite continued to be the basis of Scottish liturgical music in Scotland until the Reformation and where choirs were available, which was probably limited to the great cathedrals, collegiate churches and the wealthier parish churches it would have been used in the main ingredient of divine offices of vespers, compline, matins, lauds, mass and the canonical hours. In the later Middle Ages, the development of the doctrine of purgatory and the proliferation of altars meant that this music would have been joined by large numbers of requiem masses, designed to speed the souls of the dead to heaven, although no traces of these masses have survived. Over 100 collegiate churches of secular priests were founded in Scotland between 1450 and the Reformation. They were designed to provide masses for their founders and their families, who included the nobility and the emerging orders of the Lords of Parliament and the wealthy merchants of the developing burghs.

From the thirteenth century, Scottish church music was increasingly influenced by continental developments, with figures like the musical theorist Simon Tailler studying in Paris, before returned to Scotland where he introduced several reforms of church music. The Wolfenbüttel 677 manuscript contains a large number of French compositions, particularly from Notre Dame de Paris, beside inventive pieces by unknown Scottish composers. Monophony was replaced from the fourteenth century by the Ars Nova, a movement that developed in France and then Italy, replacing the restrictive styles of Gregorian plainchant with complex polyphony. The tradition was well established in England by the fifteenth century. The distinctive English version of polyphony, known as the Contenance Angloise (English manner), used full, rich harmonies based on the third and sixth, which was highly influential in the fashionable Burgundian court of Philip the Good, where the Burgundian School associated with Guillaume Dufay developed. In the late fifteenth century a series of Scottish musicians trained in the Netherlands before returning home, including John Broune, Thomas Inglis and John Fety, the last of whom became master of the song school in Aberdeen and then Edinburgh, introducing the new five-fingered organ playing technique. Survivals of works from the first half of the sixteenth century from St. Andrews and St. Giles, Edinburgh, and post-Reformation works from composers that were trained in this era from the abbeys of Dunfermline and Holyrood, and from the priory at St. Andrews, indicate the quality and scope of music that was undertaken at the end of the medieval period.

== Song schools ==
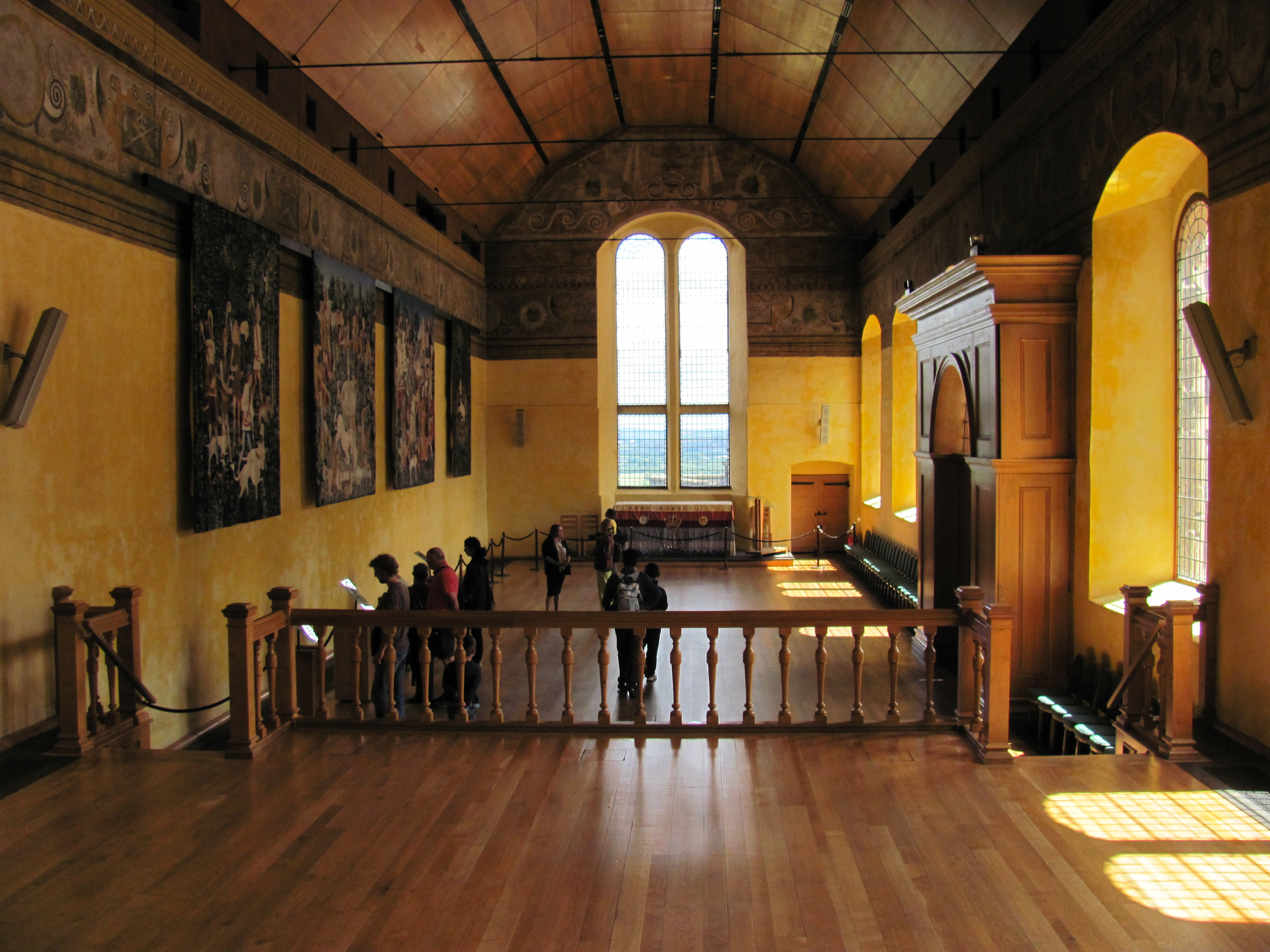
The Chapel Royal, Stirling Castle, a major focus for liturgical music

In the High Middle Ages, the need for large numbers of singing priests to fulfil the obligations of church services led to the foundation of a system of song schools, to train boys as choristers and priests, often attached to Cathedrals, wealthy monasteries and collegiate churches. The proliferation of collegiate churches and requiem masses in the later Middle Ages would have necessitated the training of large numbers of choristers, marking a considerable expansion of the song school system. The only indications of what these choristers were expected to be able to perform are in the chance survival of some sheet music in a book binding, probably from the Inverness song school. These confirm that a later work produced as part of James VI's attempt to revive the burgh song schools after the Reformation: The Art of Music, Collectit Out of all Ancient Doctours of Music (1580), was based on earlier works. A stress was placed on the technique of Faburden, associated with the Burgundian School, by which plainsong melodies, usually in the tenor voice, were harmonised according to strict rules that meant that rehearsal was unnecessary.

== Court music ==
The captivity of James I in England from 1406 to 1423, where he earned a reputation as a poet and composer, may have led him to take English and continental styles and musicians back to the Scottish court on his release. The story of the execution of James III's favourites, including the English musician William Roger, at Lauder Bridge in 1482, may indicate his interest in music. Renaissance monarchs often used chapels to impress visiting dignitaries. James III also founded a new large hexagonal Chapel Royal at Restalrig near Holyrood, that was probably designed for a large number of choristers. In 1501 his son James IV refounded the Chapel Royal within Stirling Castle, with a new and enlarged choir meant to emulate St. George's Chapel at Windsor Castle and it became the focus of Scottish liturgical music. Burgundian and English influences were probably reinforced when Henry VII's daughter Margaret Tudor married James IV in 1503. No piece of music can be unequivocally identified with these chapels, but the survival of a Mass based on the Burgundian song L'Homme armé in the later Carver Choirbook may indicate that this was part of the Chapel Royal repertoire. James IV was said to be constantly accompanied by music, but very little surviving secular music can be unequivocally attributed to his court. An entry in the accounts of the Lord Treasurer of Scotland indicates that when James IV was at Stirling on 17 April 1497, there was a payment "to twa fithalaris [fiddlers] that sang Greysteil to the king, ixs". Greysteil was an epic romance and the music survives, having been placed in a collection of lute airs in the seventeenth century.

== Popular music ==
There is evidence that there was a flourishing culture of popular music in Scotland the late Middle Ages. This includes the long list of songs given in The Complaynt of Scotland (1549). Many of the poems of this period were also originally songs, but for none has a notation of their music survived. Melodies have survived separately in the post-Reformation publication of The Gude and Godlie Ballatis (1567), which were spiritual satires on popular songs, adapted and published by the brothers James, John and Robert Wedderburn. The only song with a melody to survive from this period is the "Pleugh Song". Some surviving Scottish ballads may date back to the late medieval era and deal with events and people that can be traced back as far as the thirteenth century, including "Sir Patrick Spens" and "Thomas the Rhymer". They remained an oral tradition until the increased interest in folk songs in the eighteenth century led collectors such as Bishop Thomas Percy to publish volumes of popular ballads.
