= Habbie =

Habbie may refer to:

- The Habbie stanza or standard Habbie, also known as the Burns stanza
- Habbie Simpson, Scottish piper from Kilbarchan whom the stanza is ultimately named after
- Any inhabitant of Kilbarchan (informal usage)
