= Gaelic psalm singing =

Scottish church music tradition

Gaelic psalm singing, or Gaelic psalmody (Scottish Gaelic: Salmadaireachd), is a tradition of exclusive psalmody in the Scottish Gaelic language found in Presbyterian churches in the Western Isles of Scotland. It is a form of Gaelic music.

== Structure and style ==
The psalms are sung unaccompanied, in a style known as "lining out" or "precenting the line," in which the leader of the performance, or "precentor," sings a line, after which the rest of the congregation follows, with each member allowed to embellish the melody as they wish, in a free heterophonic fashion. The style of Gaelic psalm singing is influenced by piobaireachd music native to the Scottish Highlands, with frequent and distinctive use of ornamentation and grace notes.

== History ==
The practice of lining out psalms was common in England and lowland Scotland in the 17th century. In 1644, the Westminster Assembly mandated its use as an official form of worship but there is evidence that it was a folk custom in English Protestant churches even before then. In 1659, the book of psalms was translated into Gaelic for the first time, and it is believed that the Highlanders began to sing the psalms at this point. Lacking their own tunes, they used melodies composed in England and lowland Scotland for the psalms, though these were embellished through the use of grace-notes and ornamentation to the point where German musician Joseph Mainzer, who published a study of Gaelic psalm singing in 1844, thought that the original tunes they were based on could barely be detected.

Gaelic psalmody was historically practiced in regions in which Gaelic-speaking Protestants migrated, including the Cape Fear river valley in North Carolina (where it persisted until about the 1860s when most of the distinctively Gaelic cultural features in the region disappeared) and Nova Scotia, which received a huge number of migrants from the Highlands and islands and where Gaelic continues to be spoken to this day. Lined out singing was the main form of worship throughout colonial America and the early United States, as English, lowland Scottish, and Ulster-Scots immigrants would all have utilized the style. However, as in England, this began to be replaced with other forms of worship, such as Sacred Harp shape note singing, known in America initially as "regular" singing. In both England and America the lined-out form was known as the "old way" at this point. English lined-out singing still survives in Old Regular Baptist churches in isolated communities in the Appalachian Mountains, though these congregations sing Anglo-American hymns rather than psalms.

It has been theorized by jazz bassist and Yale music professor Willie Ruff that Gaelic psalmody was the origin of black American church singing, due to the number of Gaelic speakers (primarily from Argyllshire) who migrated to the Cape Fear Valley in North Carolina in the 18th century and might have taught the form to their slaves. However, the extent to which this is the case has been questioned by a number of scholars, including Billy Kay, Michael Newton, and Terry Miller, who note that since the lined-out singing tradition was prevalent amongst most whites living in America in the 18th and 19th centuries, there is no particular reason that the Gaels, a rather small, clustered group in North America, be considered the main source of inspiration.

Once common all over the Protestant, Gaelic-speaking regions of Scotland, Gaelic psalm singing has declined to a few Gaelic-speaking churches in the Scottish Hebrides, primarily on the Isle of Lewis but also the Isle of Harris, North Uist, Benbecula, and Skye. In the 20th century, it could also be found in regions of lowland Scotland that saw large amounts of Highland immigration, such as Partick in Glasgow, though this has largely ceased.

== In popular culture ==
Gaelic psalm singing was the main inspiration behind the Runrig song "An Ubhal as Àirde (The Highest Apple)" on their album The Cutter and the Clan.

Samples of Gaelic psalm singing have been used in songs by Capercaillie and Martyn Bennett.

Gaelic psalm singing has been made widely available through the "Salm" series of albums produced by Lewis native Calum Martin. Three volumes have been released so far, as well as a live album recorded at Celtic Connections entitled Salm and Soul featuring the Gaelic singing paired with an African-American gospel choir.

In 2019, singer-songwriter Roxanne Tataei recorded a collaboration with Gaelic psalm singers in Stornoway. This was documented in an episode of the BBC Radio 4 programme "The Sound Odyssey", released on 1 October.

In 2020, The Edge of the Sea, a collaboration between Calum Martin and Craig Armstrong of music inspired by Gaelic psalm, was released. Armstrong had experienced the tradition from church services at Hilton, on visits to his mother’s family in Balintore in Easter Ross.

== See also ==
- Scottish church music
