= Old Regular Baptists =

Appalachian religious denomination

The Old Regular Baptist denomination is one of the oldest in Appalachia with roots in both the Regular and Separate Baptists of the American colonies and the Particular Baptists of Great Britain.

They have seen a marked decline in its membership during the last two decades. Part of the decline may be attributable to practices such as dress codes and the strict belief that a person must live a holy life to enter heaven.

Other such interpretations include women not being allowed to cut their hair or speak publicly on church business, although women can frequently shout while praising. Members who do not comply with the strict dress code and practices face losing their membership in the congregation. The Old Regular Baptist faith still remains the dominant faith in some rural Central Appalachian counties along or near the Kentucky–Virginia border. In most churches, the congregation maintains a collection of photographs of deceased members.

== History ==
The Old Regular Baptist Churches of Jesus Christ in the United States, along with the Regular Primitive Baptists, trace their history to churches that sprang up in the American colonies. These early churches had been organized as Regular Baptist Churches and Separate Baptist Churches in Christ, and were found from New England to Georgia. A great migration took place in the American Colonies, and many pioneer Baptists moved westward into western Virginia, Kentucky, and Tennessee. In 1802, the North District Association was formed from the South Kentucky Association, which was organized in 1788. The North District gave rise to the Burning Springs in 1813, which led to the formation of the New Salem Association in 1825.

Churches and associations were likewise being organized in western and southwestern Virginia. In 1800, the Greenbrier Association split from the Teays Valley Association. In 1811, the Washington District Association was organized as a Regular Baptist Association. However, its origins lie in the Holston Association, which was organized in 1786 by authority of the Sandy Creek Separate Baptist Association. The Sandy Creek Separate Baptist Church was self-organized in 1756. The Washington District Association, however, upon being organized, adopted the Preambles and the Constitution of the Regular Baptists.

The Old Regular Baptist Churches of today can likewise be traced, directly or indirectly, to churches that were involved with these older associations. Others were engaged as ministers and members of the Elkhorn Association, organized in 1765. The Licking Association was organized in 1810; the Philadelphia Association, in 1707; and the Ketockton Association, on August 19, 1766, joining and organizing churches that were to become the Old Regular Baptists.

The New Salem Association of Old Regular Baptists was established in 1825, this association being an arm of the Burning Springs Association. The New Salem Association has undergone several name changes, from "Baptist" to "Regular United" in 1854, to "Regular Primitive" in 1870, to "Regular Baptist" in 1871, and then in 1892 to "Old Regular". Names that were synonymous with "Old Regular Baptist" (at least in the early history of this faith) include the Regular Predestinarian Baptist, Particular Baptist, Old School Baptist, United Baptist, Regular Primitive Baptist, and Old School or Old Order of Regular Baptist Churches and Associations. These terms had the same general meaning and were used interchangeably by many of the associations mentioned.

There have been several Old Regular Baptist associations and churches with origins other than the New Salem Association. The Burning Springs Association (1813), Red Bird Association (1823), Mountain Association (1856), and Red River Association (1876) were all directly descended from the North District Association. The Mud River Association (1888), Twin Creek Association (1850), and Spencer Association (1898), among others, originated from different clusters of churches and associations. In Virginia and elsewhere, some Old Regular Baptist Churches descended from the Sandy Creek Association, along with churches from the Washington Association and the Three Forks of Powell Valley Association.

There are Old Regular Baptist Churches that were formed from, or contained members who came directly with letters from, the Philadelphia and Ketocton Association's Churches, as well as the Yadkin, Holston, Kehukee, and Roaring River Association Churches. The Twin Creek Association was formed from a split in the Licking River Particular Baptist Association in 1850. The Twin Creek Association was one of the first associations in Kentucky to title itself "Old Regular Baptist" in 1850. The churches that made up the Twin Creek Association had roots in the Elkhorn Association and the Regular Baptist Association (Kentucky). When the Twin Creek Association of Old Regular Baptists dissolved, the remaining churches went into the North District Association by letter.

The Mud River Association originated from a split in the Pocatalico Particular Baptist Association in 1888. The Mud River used the title "Primitive Baptist" in correspondence with the New Salem Association for many years, and later titled itself "Regular" or "Old Regular Baptist". The Sandlick Regular Primitive Association and the Mates Creek Regular Primitive Baptists are both descendants of the New Salem Old Regular Baptist Association. These associations, and the Burning Springs Association, all used the names "Regular" and "Old Regular" along with "Primitive" interchangeably. The word old was added to Regular Baptist soon after many Regular Baptists had joined and began to correspond with mission boards.

This was done to distinguish the Old (or original) Regular Baptists from the New School Baptists that had emerged throughout the United States. The terms Old School, Old Regular, Old Order, and Primitive came into usage during the same time period and were being added to the Baptist name to show they were of the old form of worship and had rejected what they considered modern innovations, such as Sunday or Sabbath schools, theological seminaries, missions boards and the like.

The Old Regular Baptist in the late 1800s became concerned over the doctrines of absolute predestination, actual eternal vital union (also called eternal children doctrine), and the Atonement. The 1892 Minutes of the New Salem Association stated that the New Salem Association feared the doctrine of absolute predestination of all things, which made God the author of man's sins, and the doctrine of Arminianism, which taught that the works of the creature were essential to eternal salvation. A circular letter in the Three Forks of Powell River began circulating, supporting the actual eternal vital union doctrine. Debates within churches became more frequent as believers became more extreme in their views.

The Old Regular Baptists of Central Appalachia have, in fact, experienced several divisions over the years regarding doctrine and practice. In the late 19th century to early 20th century, they had major splits over the doctrines of absolute predestination, actual eternal vital Union, theories; this was the cause of their most significant split ever, in combination with their differences over the Atonement and election doctrines that escalated splits and divisions.

Three of New Salem's daughter churches, the Union, the Mates Creek, and the Sandlick, were divided. The New Salem Association also dropped correspondence with the Burning Springs Association, her mother church, because New Salem believed that Burning Springs had members who belonged to secret orders. The United Baptist Associations were dropped for Secret Order and Mourners Benches.

In the 1960s, a debate started over when eternal life began. There are Old Regular Baptists that hold the same views as other Primitive Baptist bodies (both Old Line and Absolute Predestination Primitive Baptist) on regeneration, that one is regenerated instantaneously on hearing the voice of the Son of God (John 5:25). These Old School Regular Baptists hold strictly that eternal life and salvation are given first in a gift by the grace of God and that the elect are called by a holy calling (II Timothy 1:9).

This effectual call is referenced as the Light of Christ doctrine (I Peter 2:9). This view teaches that faith and repentance are the effects of regeneration, not its cause. They hold that the individual is quickened by the Holy Spirit, and has everlasting life before belief and repentance. The gospel brings life and immortality to light, but has no part in regeneration. Conversion is manifested by true faith and repentance, in which a Godly sorrow sets up in the quickened individual's heart, and they are sorrowed to repentance and mourning. After the Godly sorrow has sorrowed them to repentance, they profess a burden of sin being removed and take comfort in the gospel and express an experience of grace.

Old Regular Baptists holding those views (monergism) are often derided as the "hardshell side". The synergist side holds that a man must repent and believe to be regenerated, and that through the Creature obeying, making up one's mind, taking heed to the light and call, they then are enabled by grace and the light that leads one to life. They reject an effectual call, the belief that light is not synonymous with life, and the belief that a creature can reject the light and be lost eternally. This is referred to as the "softshell side".

There is one side of the synergistic Old Regular Baptist doctrine that teaches that God dealt to every man universally a "measure of faith", and it must be put to work by the creature for salvation to occur. This teaching has been recorded in the minutes of some of the Conditional Salvation Advocates Annual Association. There are ministers within the Old Regular Baptist that hold the "Duty of Faith" and "Measure of Faith" doctrines as heresy, and claim it was invented in the 1960s in Southwestern Virginia, after the Light of Christ division came about. Any prior reference to the terminology in Old Regular Baptist records or usage uses the "Measure of Faith" to mean a gift to the regenerated and not the unregenerated.

Old Regular Baptists in Appalachia were more tolerant in doctrine, initially allowing different views on the Atonement. This stems from an earlier agreement made by the Regular and Separate Baptists when forming the United Baptists in Kentucky. While the doctrine of some traditional Old Regular Baptists (Gillites) would be in harmony with the London or Philadelphia Confessions of Faith advocating limited or particular Atonement, others among the Old Regulars hold to a more modified Calvinism and to Andrew Fuller's view of the Atonement. Some ministers and members have to a modified form of general Atonement.

The original compromise on the Atonement made by the Regular and Separate Baptists was never kept, leading to widespread doctrinal splits on the Atonement throughout Appalachia. Some made statements of the Mountain Associations that Christ made a full atonement for all those who have believed, and that these believers were the elect chosen in Christ before the foundation of the world. This statement seemed to satisfy the different factions for a while.

The Red Bird, Red River, Spencer, Sandlick, Mates Creek, Burning Springs, Mountain, Rock Springs, North District, Licking, Mud River, Twin Creek, and parts of the New Salem and Union Associations of Old Regular Baptists held to special or limited Atonement. Strict particular Atonement was the doctrine of the Washington, Pocatalico, Three Forks of Powell River, the Elkhorn of West Virginia, the majority side of Mates Creek and Sandlick Associations, and part of the Union Association. The New Salem Association corresponded with the limited atonement side of the Union Association after the split, then later switched sides and began corresponding with the side holding to a Fullerite view.

Elder J. C. Swindle from Three Forks of Powell Valley and Elder N. T. Hopkins from New Salem were champions of Andrew Fuller's atonement view, to the point that Hopkins declared the Fullerite view to be the doctrine of the New Salem Association from the pulpit. This caused several delegates representing their home churches within New Salem to abruptly leave the association, with their church letters in hand, along with sister Old Regular Baptist Association's delegates with their association letters. These delegates, churches, and associations all held to a strict or special limited atonement. At one of the New Salem Association's oldest churches, the Stone Coal Church of Garrett, Kentucky, the delegates walked out, and the church eventually divided into two bodies: an absolute predestination side and a limited predestination side. The limited predestination side believed that God predestined the salvation of his elect people, but denied that every event that occurs in time was predestined. They believed in a common salvation (timely or in time, involving the actions of the creature and an eternal salvation (the sole work of the Creator, with no action of the creature). The absolute predestination side held that God predestined every event that came to pass.

After several years apart, under the ministry of Elder Marion Chaffins, both factions reunited. Several of the churches that walked out after Hopkins' sermon were reconciled to the New Salem Association, and the ministers decided among themselves to preach the scripture, namely that Christ died for all who believe and repent through grace. The New Salem Association at one time contained ministers holding three different views on the Atonement and thereafter existed relatively peacefully.

During the 1960s, the Light of Christ or Light is Life division took place within the Union Association of Old Regular Baptists. This division was an argument over when eternal life was given, both sides holding that it was a gift given in time. This was the second time the Union Association had a large division over doctrine. The fallout from the Light of Christ division soon spread to other associations, driven by requests from the Union Association. This split led to the isolation of the Mud River Association, which advocated regeneration before faith and repentance, and to the formation of the Bethel Association.

The Elders in the Mud River Association were more sympathetic to the doctrine of the six churches that left the Union Association. The Union Association's expulsion of the Bold Camp Church was considered a violation of the Union's Constitution by most elders versed in discipline. Seven churches left the Union Association (Bold Camp, Bethel, Mount Olive, Hylton, Longs Fork, Turner, Rose Hill), and others who felt the Union dismissed Bold Camp in error. The seven churches that left formed the Bethel Association of Old Regular Baptists.

The New Salem Association leadership, seeing the chaos in the Union Association, chose not to divide over the Light of Christ issue. Today, there are still debates among the Old Regular Baptist churches over issues such as when one receives faith, men's and women's dress, the receiving of divorced members, and the doctrinal differences over hope and knowledge. Some Old Regular Baptists hold to some Arminian points, while others are more Calvinistic. There are several factions of Old Regular Baptists presently, including the Old Regular Primitive Baptists, which include the mother association (Burning Springs) and the daughter associations of New Salem (Mates Creek, Sandlick, and Union). There remain churches and associations that remain in direct doctrinal sympathy with the Old Line Primitive Baptists. There are also factions of Old Regular Baptists that are in doctrinal sympathy with the "Old" United Baptists. These "Old" United Baptists share the same heritage as the Old Regular and Primitive Baptist Churches and are old school in practice.

In the 1990s, a debate arose in the Northern New Salem Association over one of its member churches' use of fermented wine vs. grape juice in communion (wine being the original Regular Baptist custom). A query was sent to the association by a sister church against the church that used wine. All evidence indicates that the church that sent the query had not taken the proper steps in accordance with Old Regular Baptist decorum. The association involved itself, failing to return the query to the church that sent it, thereby violating its own orders. This led to two member churches breaking fellowship with the Northern New Salem Association. The two-member churches, and one formed later, lettered to the Original Mountain Liberty Association and were found to be orthodox and orderly, and were dismissed to form the Sovereign Grace Association in 1997. The Sovereign Grace Association's doctrine would be in total harmony with the Old Line Primitive Baptists of today, or close to the Original Philadelphia Association of the past.

== Faith and practice ==
The theology of the Old Regular Baptists is "election by grace", as stated in the scripture: "By Grace are ye saved through faith." While all Old Regulars preach "election by grace", a difference of opinion exists among them concerning election and predestination. Today, depending on which faction one hears preach, their doctrine ranges from absolute predestination to man being a free moral agent. The majority of Old Regular Baptists hold to a doctrine that is between these extremes, with absolutism the smallest minority.

The Old Regular Baptists are united in their eschatology; all factions hold that the binding of Satan took place during Christ's earthly ministry and that the thousand years is to be taken symbolically rather than representing a measure of time. Old Regular Baptists all believe in experimental grace, baptism by immersion, and a called and regularly ordained ministry. Old Regular Baptist factions are in agreement in believing that Christ is the Eternal Son of God, that he is now, has been, and always will be Christ.

Old Regular Baptists hold to the Godhead Three in One, the scriptures – Old and New Testament – being the written word of God and infallibility thereof, using the King James Bible exclusively, sinners being called to repentance, both faith and repentance being required prior to baptism, and justification being by the imputed righteousness of God.

Churches form local associations by which they fellowship with one another. This fellowship is formally maintained by the election of correspondents to attend the meetings of the other associations. Preachers are God-called (not trained by man), unpaid, and preach improvisational (often chanted) sermons. Baptism (in running water), the Lord's supper and foot-washing are held to be ordinances. Shouting is a frequent occurrence at an Old Regular meeting, particularly among the female membership. Conversion experiences may be a lengthy process, beginning with an awakening to sin, through a period of conviction and travail of the soul, to repentance and belief.

== Lined-out hymnody ==
One feature of worship that has garnered much attention for the Old Regular Baptists is their lined-out, non-instrumental, congregational hymnody. According to Jeff Titon, "The leader sings the very first line, and the congregation joins in when they recognize the song. After that, the song proceeds line by line: the leader briefly chants a line alone, and then the group repeats the words but to a tune that is much longer and more elaborate than the leader's chant or lining tune." E. D. Thomas' Hymns and Spiritual Songs (1877) and Edward W. Billups' The Sweet Songster (1854) are two of several "words-only" hymn books preferred by these churches, with the tunes taught aurally. The practice of lining out psalms and hymns was once common across Britain and America, but in the British Isles, the only remaining vestige of the tradition can be found in the Outer Hebrides of Scotland, where it is done in Gaelic.

Smithsonian Folkways recorded the Indian Bottom Association of Old Regular Baptists for a 1997 album called Old Regular Baptists: Lined-Out Hymnody from Southeastern Kentucky. This same congregation also provided lined-out singing for the soundtrack to the 2019 film The Mountain Minor.

== Current status ==
The majority of Old Regular Baptists are in Appalachia, particularly along the Kentucky–Virginia border, although Old Regular Baptist churches exist as far north as Michigan and as far south as Florida, and several churches still exist in the state of Washington. Currently, there are seven local associations in the New Salem correspondence: New Salem, Northern New Salem, Old Friendship, Old Indian Bottom, Philadelphia, Sardis, and Union. The Indian Bottom, Sovereign Grace, Mountain #1 and Mountain #2 Friendship, and Bethel are independent bodies no longer associated with the New Salem cluster. These 14 associations and independent churches (not lettered to an association) amount to over 350 churches with over 6,000 members. The folk singer Jean Ritchie was a member of the Old Regular Baptists in Kentucky.
