= Robert Sempill the younger =

17th-century Scottish poet

Robert Sempill, the younger (c. 1595 – c. 1663), Scottish poet, son of James Sempill, was educated at the University of Glasgow, having matriculated in March 1613.

During the Civil War he fought for the Stuarts, and seems to have suffered heavy pecuniary losses under the Commonwealth. He died between 1660 and 1669. He married Mary, daughter of Sir Thomas Lyon of Auldbar. His son, Francis Sempill, was also a writer.

His reputation is based on the Scots ballad, "The Life and Death of Habbie Simpson, Piper of Kilbarchan", written c. 1640. It is an interesting picture of the times; and it gave fresh vogue to the popular six-lined stanza which was much used later by Allan Ramsay, Robert Fergusson and Robert Burns (see particularly, Burns's Poor Mailie's Elegy). Two broadside copies were printed before 1700, and it appeared in James Watson's Collection of Poems (1706–1710). Sempill is supposed to be the author also of an epitaph on Sawney Briggs, nephew to Habbie Simpson, written in the same stanza.

He wrote a continuation of his father's Packman's Pater Noster.

== See also ==
- Habbie stanza
