= Lining out =

Form of hymn-singing

Lining out or hymn lining, called precenting the line in Scotland, is a form of a cappella hymn-singing or hymnody in which a leader, often called the clerk or precentor, gives each line of a hymn tune as it is to be sung, usually in a chanted form giving or suggesting the tune. It can be considered a form of call and response. First referred to as "the old way of singing" in 18th-century Britain, it has influenced 20th-century popular-music singing styles.

In 1644, the Westminster Assembly outlined its usage in English churches "for the present, where many in the congregation cannot read". Lining out spread rapidly to the Scottish churches where it has persisted longest in Britain. It has survived to the present day among some communities and contexts, including the Gaelic psalmody on Lewis in Scotland, the Old Regular Baptists of the southern Appalachians in the United States, and for informal worship in many African American congregations.

== History ==
Lining out first appears in 17th-century Britain when literacy rates were low and books were expensive. Precenting the line was characterised by a slow, drawn-out heterophonic and often profusely ornamented melody, while a clerk or precentor (song leader) chanted the text line by line before it was sung by the congregation. It was outlined for use by the Westminster Assembly for English churches in 1644, and it has persisted longest in Britain in the Scottish Hebrides. Lining out was taken to American colonies by English and Scottish emigrants. Psalm-singing and gospel music are a mainstay of African-American churchgoers. The great influx of Presbyterians from the Scottish Highlands into the Carolinas might have introduced some African slaves to this form of worship, though the extent to which this influenced African-American church singing has been disputed, because English, lowland Scottish, and Ulster-Scots colonists, all of whom would have lined hymns, were far more numerous than the Highlanders in the region and could more easily have influenced the African Americans.

The tide turned against lining out in England and New England in the first quarter of the 18th century, with greater literacy, improved availability of texts such as New Version of the Psalms of David (1696) by Nahum Tate and Nicholas Brady, and more widely available and better-printed tune collections. Influential clerics in England and America disliked the ragged nature of the singing that resulted as the congregation struggled to remember both the tune and the words from the lining out, but it continued to be practiced in most rural churches and still survives today in a form that likely would have been familiar to the original English and Ulster-Scots colonists in isolated communities in the Appalachian Mountains.

Lining out was in most places replaced by "regular singing", in which either the congregation knew a small number of tunes like Old 100th that could be fitted to many different texts in standard meters such as long meter, or a tunebook was used along with a word book. There began to be "singing societies" of young men who met one evening a week to rehearse. As time went on, a section of the church was allocated for these trained voices to sit together as a choir, and churches voted to end the lining out system (although there was often a transitional phase that had the entire congregation singing from tunebooks like the still-popular The Sacred Harp and others, before this was taken over by using trained choirs; this gave birth to the still vibrant tradition of "Sacred harp singing"). A vivid picture of the transition comes from Worcester, Massachusetts:

The History of Worcester gives an interesting account of the final scene which ensued on the abolition of the "lining out" system, and the introduction of the choir. On Aug, 5, 1779, it was voted, "That the singers sit in the front seats of the gallery, and that those gentlemen who have hitherto sat in the front seats in said gallery, have a right to sit in the front and second seat below. and that said singers have said seats appropriated to said use. Voted, that said singers be requested to take said seats and carry on the singing in public worship. Voted, that the mode of singing in the congregation here be without reading the psalms line by line to be sung. The Sabbath after the adoption of these votes, after the hymn had been read by the minister, the aged, and venerable Deacon Chamberlain, unwilling to desert the custom of his fathers, rose and read the first line, according to the usual practice. The singers, prepared to carry the alteration into effect, proceeded without pausing at the conclusion. The white-haired officer of the church, with the full power of his voice, read on till the louder notes of the collected body overpowered the attempt to resist the progress of improvement, and the deacon, deeply mortified at the triumph of musical reformation, seized his hat, and retired from the meeting house in tears. His conduct was censured by the church, and he was for a time deprived of its communion for absenting himself from the public services of the Sabbath.

— Granville L. Howe and William Smythe Babcock Mathews, A Hundred Years of Music in America: An Account of Musical Effort in America, (G.L. Howe, Chicago, 1889)

== Current usage ==
Some Christian churches in the U.S. still practice lining out. While some churches calling themselves Primitive Baptist or Regular Baptist use it, this form of singing predominates among the Old Regular Baptist churches. The practice is becoming attenuated in some of them—the leader will begin lining out, but after the first verse or two will say "Sing on!", or a part of the service is lined out, but other parts are not, so how long it will survive is unclear.

Some Presbyterian churches in Scotland also still do lining out, though often now in a restricted context, with other hymns being accompanied and not lined out. The practice is now more common in Gaelic psalm singing than in English, and indeed is often considered a characteristic of Gaelic culture, especially on the Isle of Lewis. Unlike other denominations that carry on the tradition of lining out, Gaelic churches practice Exclusive Psalmody. It is suggested that the last English-speaking congregation in the south of Scotland to give up weekly use of “reading the line” was the South Clerk Street branch of the Original Secession Church in Edinburgh, who only discontinued the tradition in 1912. Thus, they may have been the last indigenous Lowland congregation to give out the line in public worship.

On the Isle of Skye, the use of the "line" in English at funerals in the Free Presbyterian Church of Scotland possibly lasted until the 1960s. And, sporadic instances elsewhere in the years since across the Highlands. This includes Flashadder and Staffin Free Presbyterian Churches, and Strathay APC.

Lining of hymns is still widely practiced by the three traditional branches of the Hutterites (Lehrerleut, Dariusleut, Schmiedeleut II). It may also be heard among some conservative Anabaptist churches, such as German Baptist Brethren, Old Order Mennonites, and the Old Order River Brethren.

== In popular culture ==
In the film Coal Miner's Daughter, lining out is depicted at the funeral of Loretta Lynn's father, Ted Webb.
