= David Peebles =

Scottish composer

David Peebles [Pables] (died 1579?) was a Scottish composer of religious music.

== Biography ==
Little is known of his life but the majority of his work dates to between 1530 and 1576. He is known to have been a canon at the Augustinian Priory of St Andrews until the Scottish Reformation (1559–60). After leaving the priory at the Reformation he seems to have married and had two children. He was dead some time before 1592, as his wife's will of that date describes her as Peebles's "relict", and mentions two lawful sons, Andrew and Thomas.

== Work and influence ==
His most well-known composition, Si quis diligit me (text from John 14:23), is a motet for four voices (SATB) and was written around 1530 and presented to James V of Scotland, who "being a musitian ... did lyke it verray weill". Francy Heagy added an alto part to this motet around 1547 and this is shown in most contemporary editions.

In the 1560s, following the Reformation, Peebles was commissioned by James Stewart, Earl of Moray and the natural son of James V, to set the Book of Psalms to music in four parts; 105 of these settings, written with the tune in the tenor, were composed for use in Scottish churches.
