= Habbie Simpson =

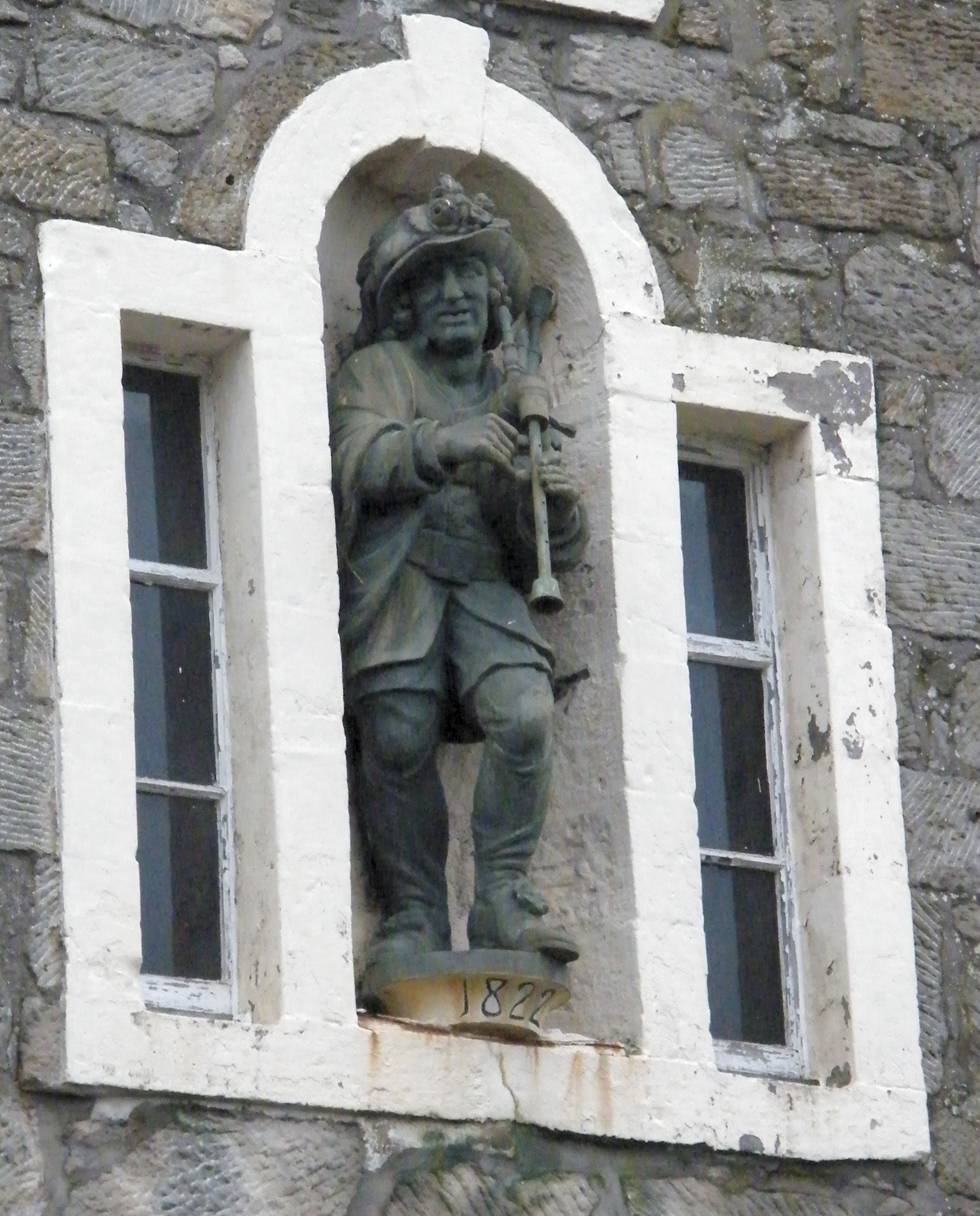
Photograph of the statue of Habbie Simpson in Kilbarchan

Habbie Simpson (1550–1620) was the town piper in the Scottish village of Kilbarchan in Renfrewshire. Today Simpson is chiefly known as the subject of the poem the Lament for Habbie Simpson (also known as The life and death of the piper of Kilbarchan). Inhabitants of Kilbarchan are informally known as "Habbies" to this day.

The Lament for Habbie Simpson, written by Robert Sempill the younger, was the first notable poem written in the form known as "standard Habbie", or Burns stanza. The Burns stanza was widely used by Burns and Robert Fergusson in their poems.

Kilbarchan's Steeple Building has an exterior niche which contains a statue of Simpson. The original statue was carved in wood by Archibald Robertson of Greenock and placed in the niche in 1822. The current statue, dating from 1932, is made of bronze and it replaced the original statue.

During Kilbarchan's annual Lilias Day celebrations, it is customary for the piper to dress up as Habbie Simpson.
