= John Purser (musician) =

Scottish composer, musicologist, and music historian

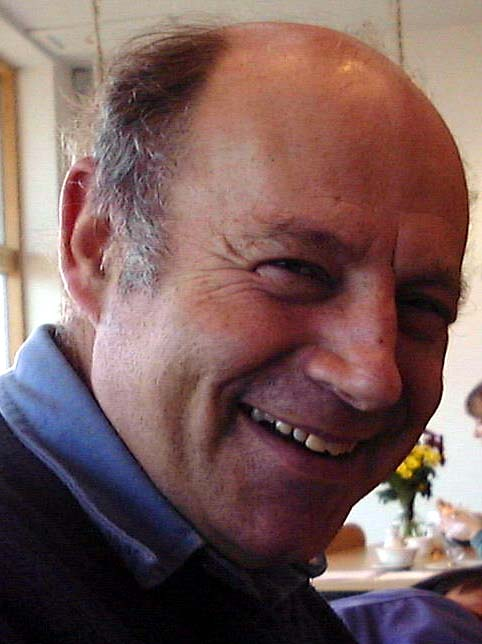
- John Purser at Scotland Music
- Born: 1942 (age 83–84); Glasgow, Scotland
- Occupations: Composer, musicologist, music historian, playwright
- Notable work: Scotland's Music, Carver (play)

John Purser (born 1942) is a Scottish composer, musicologist, music historian and playwright.

Purser was born in Glasgow. He initiated the reconstruction that commenced in 1991 of the Iron Age Deskford Carnyx, producing a replica that was first played in 1993 by trombonist John Kenny.

Purser's book Scotland's Music, published in March 1992 (new edition October 2007), was a major reference work on musical history from the Bronze Age to the present. It was followed by a thirty-programme radio series of the same title, written and presented by him, which was broadcast on BBC Radio Scotland and totalled 45 hours, with recordings commissioned for the series including reconstructions of early music and works by many little-known composers. A double CD was subsequently produced with a small selection of the music. Purser's work has contributed to a revival of interest in such composers as John Clerk of Penicuik and John Thomson.

'Consider the Story', a privately released disc of Purser's music, was released in 2021. It includes the song cycle Six Sea Songs (1966, setting words by the composer's father J W R Purser), the Kalavrita string quartet (1981), and the Sonata for Trombone and Piano (2001).

Purser's plays include the radio play Carver about Robert Carver, the 16th-century Scottish composer of church music, which won a Giles Cooper Award. It premiered on BBC Radio 3 on 31 March 1991, in a production recorded on 2 December 1990. He also wrote Parrots and Owls about John Ruskin and the O'Shea brothers.

== Selected works ==
=== Stage ===
- The Undertaker, Opera (1969)
- The Bell, Opera

=== Radio ===
- Papageno, BBC Scotland (1976)
- Heartwood, BBC Scotland (1978)
- Girl at a Window, BBC Scotland (1985)
- Carver, BBC Radio 3 (31 March 1991)
- Parrots and Owls, BBC Scotland, BBC Radio 3 (September 1994)
- The Secret Commonwealth, BBC Radio 4 (14 December 1997)

=== Orchestral ===
- Intrada for Strings for string orchestra, Op. 17 (1966)
- Clydefair Overture (1972)
- Ane Gentill Chantecleir (1990)
- Bannockburn
- Epitaph
- Variations on an Irish Folk-Tune for string orchestra

=== Concertante ===
- Concertino for piano and orchestra (1986)
- Concerto for viola and string orchestra

=== Chamber music ===
- Sonata for flute and piano, Op. 11 (1964–1965)
- Dances of Ilion for clarinet and piano, Op. 24
- Suite for Unaccompanied Violin, Op. 29
- Three Studies for horn and piano (1976)
- Carrier Strike for piccolo, trumpet and harpsichord (1977)
- String Quartet Kalavrita (1981)
- Prelude and Toccata for guitar (1985)
- Sonata for cello and piano (1988)
- Sonata for violin and piano (1989)
- Skyelines I / II for tenor trombone and organ (1994)
- Skyeline III for string quartet (1995)
- Ave atque vale for trombone (1996)
- Lament for a Chickadee for carillon (1998)
- Sonata for Trombone and Piano (2002)
- In Memory of Michael Miles for flute solo (2005)
- Piobaireachd "Wai Taheke" for flute solo (2005)
- Puna for Taonga pūoro and bassoon (2005)
- Silver Reflections for cello and piano (2013)
- The Butterfly for flute, harp and organ

=== Keyboard ===
- Toccata for organ (1968, revised 2003)
- Clavier Sonata for chamber organ (or piano) (1974)
- Circus Suite for Nick for piano (1975)

=== Vocal ===
- Johnnie Faa, Variation 6 for soprano, flute, cello and harp (1988)
- The Seal of the City for soprano, tenor, bass, clarinet, trumpet, horn, percussion and organ (1996)
- Ave Atque Vale for alto and baritone
- Five Landscapes for voice and piano
- Love My Lewd Pilot for soprano, baritone, flute and piano; words by Edmund Spenser (2002)
- Lovely Molly for voice and piano
- Six Sea Songs for tenor and piano (1966)
- Throat for soprano, carnyx and percussion

=== Choral ===
- Magnificat for mixed chorus a cappella (1964)
- The Wren Boys for mixed chorus, 2 piccolos, string orchestra and organ (1983)
- Epithalamion for mixed chorus a cappella (1984)
- If All You Gave for mixed chorus a cappella
- Nunc Dimittis for mixed chorus a cappella
- Love in Season for mixed chorus a cappella
- Simplon Pass for mixed chorus a cappella
