= Celtic chant =

Liturgical chant

Celtic chant is the liturgical plainchant repertory of the Celtic rite of the Catholic Church performed in Celtic Britain, Gaelic Ireland, and Brittany. It is related to, but distinct from the Gregorian chant of the Sarum use of the Roman rite which officially supplanted it by the 12th century. Although no Celtic chant was notated, some traces of its musical style are believed to remain.

== History ==
The Celtic Church goes back to the Irish monastic traditions. The churches in Ireland and Britain had no central authority except, in theory, Rome, which in practice exerted very little influence. Notable in this transition from local Irish customs to more standardized Roman traditions was the conflict over the dating of Easter, where the Roman tradition of solar dating finally supplanted the Irish lunar dating at the Synod of Tara in 692. Over the next several centuries, versions of the Roman rite such as the Use of Salisbury were gradually enforced in Brittany in the 9th century, Scotland in the 11th century.

== Musical characteristics ==
The Irish monks famously established monasteries throughout much of Europe. As a result, Celtic chant was influenced by Spanish, Gallic, Roman, and Eastern traits. However, it shows the greatest liturgical similarity with Gallican chant.

No musical specimen prior to Roman influence survives. One chant typical of those that may reflect this style is Ibunt sancti, whose use was attested in Ireland. The original text shows elements such as alliteration and a couplet structure. The surviving melody, from a French manuscript, has an ABA structure, in which the opening phrase is repeated at the end of the melody, and the whole melody is repeated for the second half of the couplet. Neither the ABA structure nor the repeated melody for the couplet are typical of the Roman chant traditions, except in Sequences, which themselves trace back to Notker of St Gall's and Tuotilo's tropes at the Irish-founded Abbey of St. Gall.
