= Robert Carver (composer) =

Scottish composer (c1485-1570)

Robert Carver CRSA (also Carvor, Arnot; c. 1485 – c. 1570) was a Scottish Canon regular and composer of Christian sacred music during the Renaissance.

Carver is regarded as Scotland's greatest composer of the 16th century. He is best known for his polyphonic choral music, of which there are five surviving masses and two surviving motets. The works that can definitely be attributed to him can be found in the Carver Choirbook held in the National Library of Scotland.

Carver's work, noted for the gradual build-up of ideas towards a resolution in the final passages, is still performed and recorded today. Carver was influenced by composers in continental Europe, and his surviving music differs greatly from that produced by many of his contemporaries in Scotland or England at the time. Highly ornate in style, it resembles most closely the richly decorated music of the Eton Choirbook.

Carver was the subject of the 1991 BBC radio play Carver by John Purser, which won one of the Giles Cooper Awards for that year.

== Biography ==
Carver spent much of his life at Scone Abbey. A recently rediscovered charter book for the abbey, with upwards of 50 examples of Carver's signature, suggests that he spent the whole of his long life as a canon there, having entered the community in 1508 and living there until the establishment was destroyed by Protestant reformers in 1559. Several works in The Carver Choirbook refer to the composer as Robert Carver alias arnat. Nothing is known of his life after this event.

A man by the name of Robert Arnott was recorded in the same period as a canon of the Chapel Royal in Stirling Castle. However, as this Robert Arnott's presence in the Chapel Royal and Carver's use of the alias Arnot do not coincide, and furthermore the Chapel Royal Robert Arnott signed a document for a Margaret Arnott who is clearly a blood relative, it seems likely that Robert Carver and Robert Arnott are two distinct personages.

== Known compositions ==
The following works are attributed to Robert Carver in the Carver Choirbook:

- Dum sacrum mysterium. A mass for ten voices.
- L'homme armé. A mass for four voices.
- Pater Creator omnium. A mass for four voices.
- Fera pessima. A mass for five voices.
- An unnamed mass for six voices.
- O bone Jesu. A motet for nineteen voices.
- Gaude flore virginali. A motet for five voices.

An unnamed Mass for three voices in the Carver Choirbook as well as a Mass Cantate Domino for six voices in the Dowglas/ Fischar partbooks are generally attributed to Carver. Some authorities also credit Carver with the composition of the Mass Felix namque for six voices, also in the Dowglas/ Fischar Partbooks.

For the complete works of Carver see Musica Scotica I: The Complete Works of Robert Carver and Two Anonymous Masses: Editions of Early Scottish Music, edited by Kenneth Elliott, University of Glasgow Music Department Publication, 31 October 1996.
