= Chronological list of Scottish classical composers =

The following is a chronological list of classical music composers living and working in Scotland, or originating from Scotland.

== Renaissance ==
- Robert Johnson (Scottish composer) (c. 1470 – after 1554)
- Robert Carver (composer) (c. 1485 – c. 1570)
- Tobias Hume (possibly 1579 – 1645)

== Baroque ==
- John Abell (1653 – after 1724)
- John Clerk (1676–1755)
- William McGibbon (1690 – 1756)

== Classical era ==
- James Oswald (1710–1769)
- Andrew Tait (c.1710–1778)
- Thomas Erskine (1732–1781)

== Romantic ==
- Sophia Dussek (1775 – 1831)
- John Thomson (1805 – 1841)
- Alicia Ann Spottiswoode (1810 – 1900)
- Alexander Mackenzie (1847 – 1935)
- Helen Hopekirk (1856 – 1945)
- William Wallace (1860 – 1940)
- Eugen d'Albert (1864 – 1932)
- Learmont Drysdale (1866 – 1909)
- Frederic Lamond (1868 – 1948)
- Hamish MacCunn (1868 – 1916)
- John Blackwood McEwen (1868 – 1948)
- Donald Tovey (1875 – 1940)
- T. J. Crawford (1877 – 1955)
- Cecil Coles (1888 – 1918)

== Modern/Contemporary ==
- Francis George Scott (1880 – 1958)
- James Friskin (1886 – 1967)
- Erik Chisholm (1904 – 1965)
- Alan Richardson (1904 – 1978)
- William Wordsworth (1908 – 1988)
- Robin Orr (1909 – 2006)
- Shena Fraser (1910 – 1993)
- Ronald Center (1913 – 1973)
- Robert Bruce (1915 – 2012)
- Geraldine Mucha (1917 – 2012)
- Iain Ellis Hamilton (1922 – 2000)
- James Brian Bonsor (1926 – 2011)
- Thomas Wilson (1927 – 2001)
- Thea Musgrave (born 1928)
- Ronald Stevenson (1928 – 2015)
- James Douglas (born 1932)
- John McLeod (born 1934)
- Janet Beat (born 1937)
- John Hearne (born 1937)
- Claire Liddell (born 1937)
- John Maxwell Geddes (1941 – 2017)
- Martin Dalby (1942 – 2018)
- David Johnson (1942 – 2009)
- John Purser (born 1942)
- Lyell Cresswell (born 1944)
- Morris Pert (1947 – 2010)
- Derek Watson (1948 – 2018)
- Edward ("Eddie") McGuire (born 1948)
- Nigel Osborne (born 1948)
- James Dillon (born 1950)
- Alistair Hinton (born 1950)
- William Sweeney (born 1950)
- Sally Beamish (born 1956)
- John Lunn (born 1956)
- John Kenny (born 1957)
- Craig Armstrong (born 1959)
- James MacMillan (born 1959)
- Pete Stollery (born 1960)
- Jennifer Margaret Barker (born 1965)
- Gordon McPherson (born 1965)
- Stuart Mitchell (1965 – 2018)
- James Clapperton (born 1968)
- Alwynne Pritchard (born 1968)
- David Horne (born 1970)
- Julian Wagstaff (born 1970)
- Lorne Balfe (born 1976)
- Stuart MacRae (born 1976)
- Gordon Cree (born 1977)
- Gareth Williams (born 1977)
- Anna Meredith (born 1978)
- Helen Grime (born 1981)
- Harry Whalley (born 1984)
- Matthew Whiteside (born 1988)
- Cameron Sinclair (nd)

== See also ==
- Classical music of the United Kingdom
