= Classical music in Scotland =

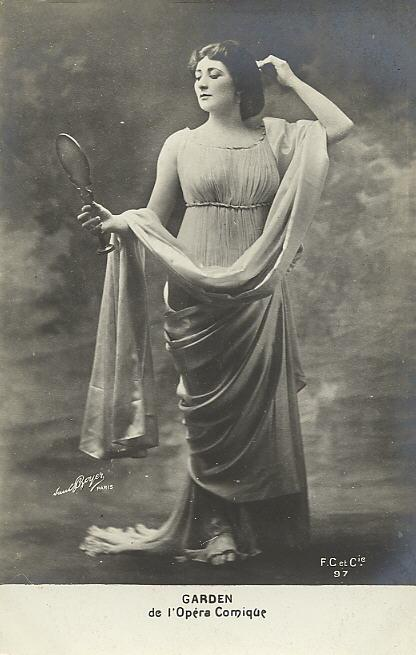
Mary Garden, one of the major Scottish performers of the late nineteenth and early twentieth centuries, in the opera Thaïs

Classical music in Scotland is all art music in the Western European classical tradition, between its introduction in the eighteenth century until the present day. The development of a distinct tradition of art music in Scotland was limited by the impact of the Scottish Reformation on ecclesiastical music from the sixteenth century. Concerts, largely composed of "Scottish airs", developed in the seventeenth century and classical instruments were introduced to the country. Music in Edinburgh prospered through the patronage of figures including Sir John Clerk of Penicuik. The Italian style of classical music was probably first brought to Scotland by the cellist and composer Lorenzo Bocchi, who travelled to Scotland in the 1720s. The Musical Society of Edinburgh was incorporated in 1728. Several Italian musicians were active in the capital in this period and there are several known Scottish composers in the classical style, including Thomas Erskine, 6th Earl of Kellie, the first Scot known to have produced a symphony.

In the mid-eighteenth century a group of Scottish composers including James Oswald and William McGibbon created the "Scots drawing room style", taking primarily Lowland Scottish tunes and making them acceptable to a middle class audience. In the 1790s Robert Burns embarked on an attempt to produce a corpus of Scottish national song contributing about a third of the songs of the Scots Musical Museum. Burns also collaborated with George Thomson in A Select Collection of Original Scottish Airs, which adapted Scottish folk songs with "classical" arrangements. However, Burns' championing of Scottish music may have prevented the establishment of a tradition of European concert music in Scotland, which faltered towards the end of the eighteenth century.

From the mid-nineteenth century classical music began a revival in Scotland, aided by the visits of Chopin and Mendelssohn in the 1840s. By the late nineteenth century, there was in effect a national school of orchestral and operatic music in Scotland, with major composers including Alexander Mackenzie, William Wallace, Learmont Drysdale and Hamish MacCunn. Major performers included the pianist Frederic Lamond, and singers Mary Garden and Joseph Hislop. After World War I, Robin Orr and Cedric Thorpe Davie were influenced by modernism and Scottish musical cadences. Erik Chisholm founded the Scottish Ballet Society and helped create several ballets. The Edinburgh Festival was founded in 1947 and led to an expansion of classical music in Scotland, leading to the foundation of Scottish Opera in 1960. Important post-war composers included Ronald Stevenson, Francis George Scott, Edward McGuire, William Sweeney, Iain Hamilton, Thomas Wilson, Thea Musgrave, John McLeod CBE and Sir James MacMillan. Craig Armstrong has produced music for numerous films. Major performers include the percussionist Evelyn Glennie. Major Scottish orchestras include: Royal Scottish National Orchestra (RSNO), the Scottish Chamber Orchestra (SCO) and the BBC Scottish Symphony Orchestra (BBC SSO). Major venues include Glasgow Royal Concert Hall, Usher Hall, Edinburgh and Queen's Hall, Edinburgh.

== Origins ==
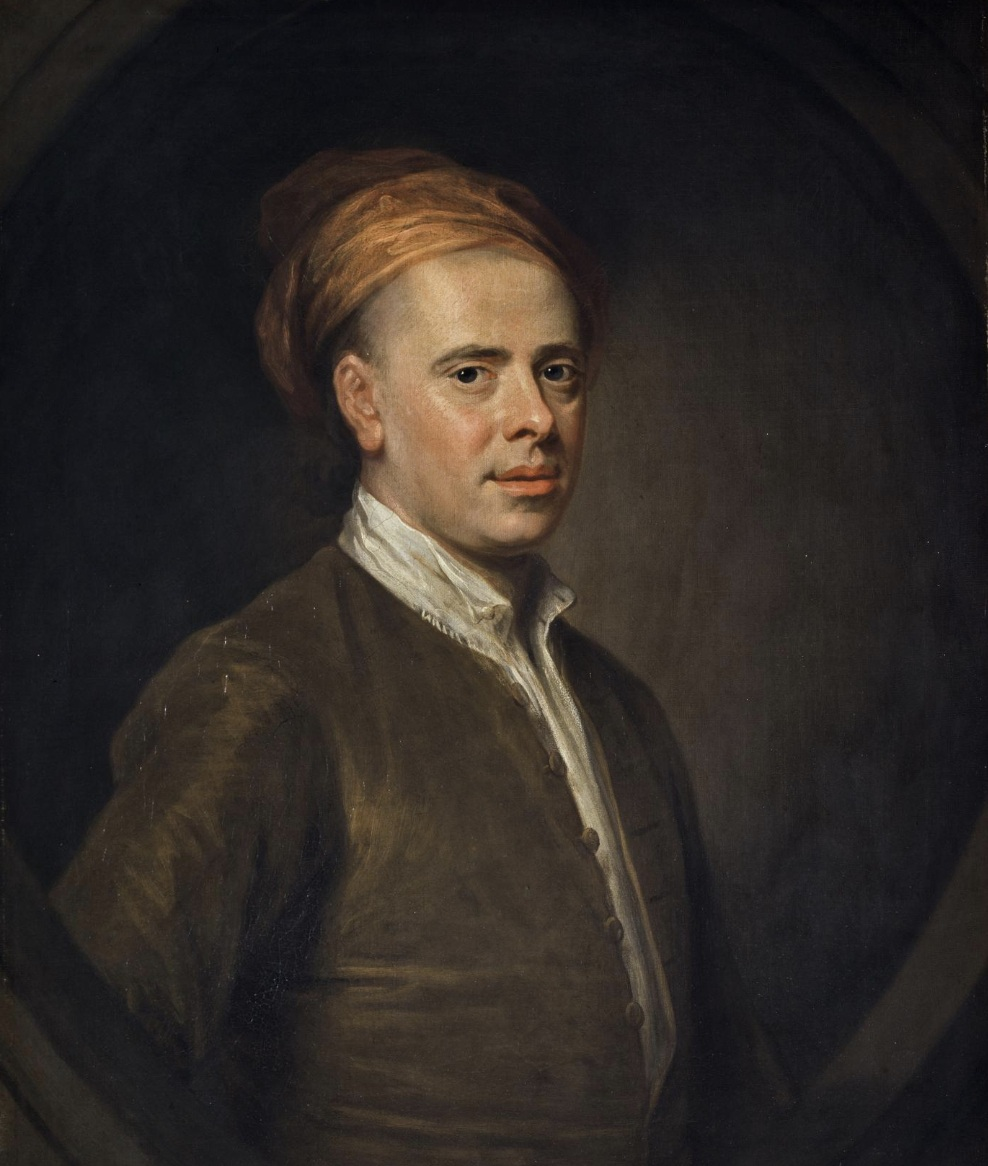
Allan Ramsay, poet and librettist, painted in 1722 by William Aikman

The development of a distinct tradition of art music in Scotland was limited by the impact of the Scottish Reformation on ecclesiastical music from the sixteenth century, which replaced complex polyphony and organ music with monophonic congregational psalmody. The lack of a need for professional musicians to compose and perform liturgical music meant that there was not a group of trained musicians who could easily participate in the Italian-inspired idiom of classical music that developed almost everywhere else in Europe in the seventeenth century. From the late seventeenth century music became less an accomplishment of the gentle classes and more a skill pursued by professionals. It was increasingly enjoyed in otherwise silent concert rooms, rather than as incidental entertainment in the houses of royalty and nobles. Much of these concerts consisted of "Scottish Airs", native Scottish tunes developed for the lute or the fiddle. The German flute was probably introduced into Scotland towards the end of the seventeenth century and the classical violin, which replaced older fiddles, in the early eighteenth century. Music in Edinburgh prospered through the patronage of figures including Sir John Clerk of Penicuik (1676–1755), who was also a noted composer, violinist and harpsichordist. He studied in Europe with Bernardo Pasquini (1637–1710) and Arcangelo Corelli (1653–1713). The St. Cecilia's Society was founded in Edinburgh 1695 to promote musical performances.

== Eighteenth century ==
The Italian style of classical music was probably first brought to Scotland by the cellist and composer Lorenzo Bocchi, who travelled to Scotland in the 1720s, introducing the cello to the country and then developing settings for Lowland Scots songs. He possibly had a hand in the first Scottish Opera, the pastoral The Gentle Shepherd (1725), with libretto by Allan Ramsay (1686–1758). The growth of a musical culture in the capital was marked by the incorporation of the Musical Society of Edinburgh in 1728 as the successor to the St. Cecilia's Society. By the mid-eighteenth century there were several Italians resident in Scotland, acting as composers and performers. These included Nicolò Pasquali, Giusto Tenducci and Fransesco Barsanti. Scottish composers known to be active in this period include Alexander Munro (fl. c. 1732), James Foulis (1710–73) and Charles McLean (fl. c. 1737). Thomas Erskine, 6th Earl of Kellie (1732–81) was one of the most important British composers of his era, and the first Scot known to have produced a symphony. The Edinburgh Musical Society was so successful in this period that it was able to build its own oval concert hall, St Cecilia's, in 1762. According to Jamie Baxter, by 1775 Edinburgh was a minor, but functioning European musical centre, with foreign and native resident composers and professional musicians.

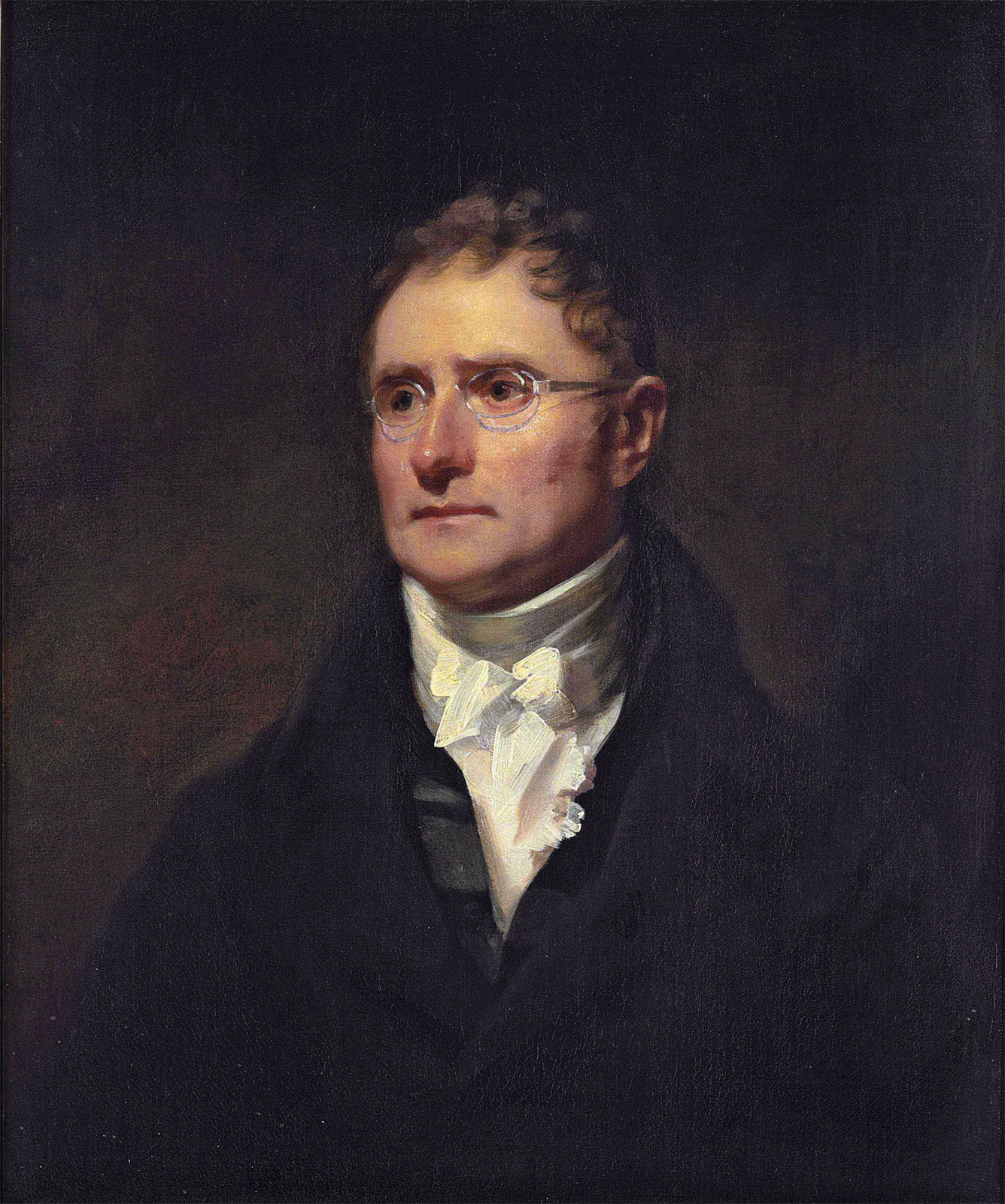
George Thomson by Henry Raeburn

In the mid-eighteenth century a group of Scottish composers began to respond to Allan Ramsey's call to "own and refine" their own musical tradition, creating what James Johnson has characterised as the "Scots drawing room style", taking primarily Lowland Scottish tunes and adding simple figured basslines and other features from Italian music that made them acceptable to a middle class audience. It gained momentum when major Scottish composers like James Oswald (1710–69) and William McGibbon (1690–1756) became involved around 1740. Oswald's Curious Collection of Scottish Songs (1740) was one of the first to include Gaelic tunes alongside Lowland ones, setting a fashion common by the middle of the century and helping to create a unified Scottish musical identity. However, with changing fashions there was a decline in the publication of collections of specifically Scottish collections of tunes, in favour of their incorporation into British collections.

In the 1790s Robert Burns (1759–96) embarked on an attempt to produce a corpus of Scottish national song, building on the work of antiquarians and musicologists such as William Tytler (1711–92), James Beattie (1735–1803) and Joseph Ritson (1752–1803). Working with music engraver and seller James Johnson, he contributed about a third of the eventual songs of the collection known as the Scots Musical Museum, issued between 1787 and 1803 in six volumes. Burns collaborated with George Thomson (1757–1851) in A Select Collection of Original Scottish Airs, published from 1793 to 1818, which adapted Scottish folk songs with "classical" arrangements. Thompson was inspired by hearing Scottish songs sung by visiting Italian castrati at the St Cecilia Concerts in Edinburgh. He collected Scottish songs and commissioned musical arrangements from the best European composers, who included Joseph Haydn (1732–1809) and Ludwig van Beethoven (1732–1809). Burns was employed in editing the lyrics. A Select Collection of Original Scottish Airs was published in five volumes between 1799 and 1818. It helped make Scottish songs part of the European cannon of classical music, while Thompson's work brought elements of Romanticism, such as harmonies based on those of Beethoven, into Scottish classical music. However, J. A. Baxter has suggested that Burns' championing of Scottish music may have prevented the establishment of a tradition of European concert music in Scotland, which faltered towards the end of the century. The Edinburgh Musical Society gave its last concert in 1798 and was wound up in 1801, with its concert hall sold off to become a Baptist church.

== Nineteenth century ==
Also involved in the collection and publication of Scottish songs was Walter Scott (1771–1832), whose first literary effort was Minstrelsy of the Scottish Border, published in three volumes (1802–03). This collection first drew the attention of an international audience to his work, and some of his lyrics were set to music by Franz Schubert (1797–1828), who also created a setting of Ossian.

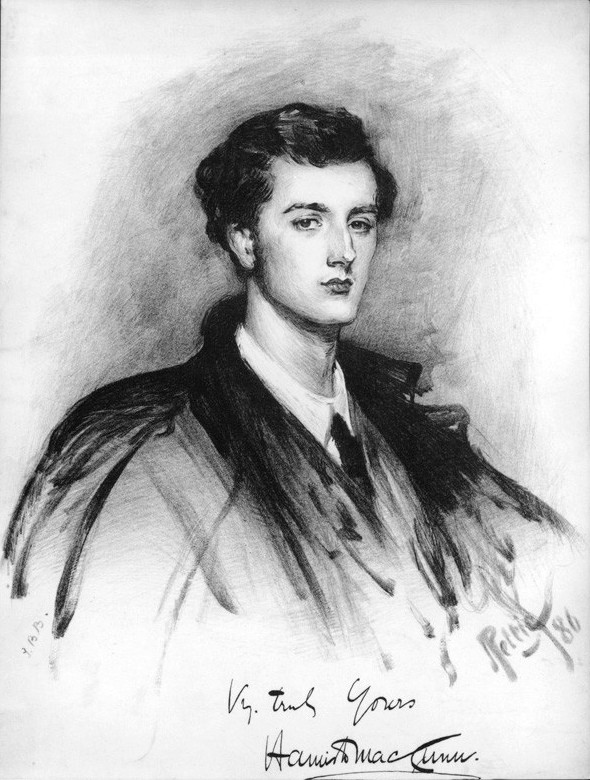
Hamish MacCunn

From the mid-nineteenth century classical music began a revival in Scotland, aided by the visits of Frédéric Chopin (1810–49) and Felix Mendelssohn (1809–47) in the 1840s. Mendelssohn was probably the most influential composer of his era and visited Britain ten times, for a total of twenty months, from 1829. Scotland inspired two of his most famous works, the overture Fingal's Cave (also known as the Hebrides Overture) and the Scottish Symphony (Symphony No. 3). On his last visit to England in 1847, he conducted his own Scottish Symphony with the Philharmonic Orchestra before Queen Victoria and Prince Albert. Max Bruch (1838–1920) composed the Scottish Fantasy (1880) for violin and orchestra, which includes an arrangement of the tune "Hey Tuttie Tatie", best known for its use in the song "Scots Wha Hae" by Burns.

By the late nineteenth century, there was in effect a national school of orchestral and operatic music in Scotland. Major composers included Alexander Mackenzie (1847–1935), William Wallace (1860–1940), Learmont Drysdale (1866–1909) and Hamish MacCunn (1868–1916). Mackenzie, who studied in Germany and Italy and mixed Scottish themes with German Romanticism, is best known for his three Scottish Rhapsodies (1879–80, 1911), Pibroch for violin and orchestra (1889) and the Scottish Concerto for piano (1897), all involving Scottish themes and folk melodies. Wallace's work included an overture, In Praise of Scottish Poesie (1894). Drysdale's work often dealt with Scottish themes, including the overture Tam O’ Shanter (1890), the cantata The Kelpie (1891). MacCunn's overture The Land of the Mountain and the Flood (1887), his Six Scotch Dances (1896), his operas Jeanie Deans (1894) and Dairmid (1897) and choral works on Scottish subjects have been described by I. G. C. Hutchison as the musical equivalent of the Scots Baronial castles of Abbotsford and Balmoral.

Major performers included the pianist Frederic Lamond (1868–1948), and singers Mary Garden (1874–1967) and Joseph Hislop (1884–1977). The Scottish Orchestra was founded in 1891 and the Glasgow Athenaeum in 1893.

== Twentieth century to the present day ==
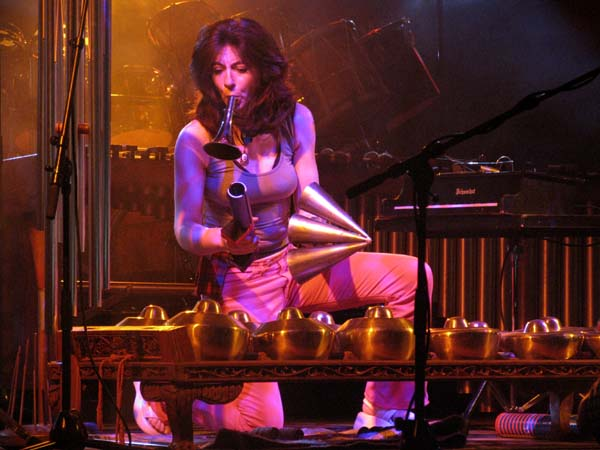
Percussionist Evelyn Glennie

Drysdale's later work included the tone poem A Border Romance (1904), and the cantata Tamlane (1905). Wallace produced his pioneering symphonic poem about his namesake, medieval nationalist William Wallace AD 1305–1905 (1905); and a cantata, The Massacre of the Macpherson (1910). John McEwen's (1868–1948) more overtly national works included Grey Galloway (1908), the Solway Symphony (1911) and Prince Charlie, A Scottish Rhapsody (1924). Conductor Hugh S. Roberton (1874–1952), founded the Glasgow Orpheus Choir in 1906 and Donald Tovey was appointed the Reid Professor of Music at the University of Edinburgh in 1914.

After World War I, Robin Orr (1909–2006) and Cedric Thorpe Davie (1913–83) were influenced by modernism and Scottish musical cadences. The influence of modernism can also be heard in the work of Erik Chisholm (1904–65) in his Pibroch Piano Concerto (1930) and the Straloch suite for Orchestra (1933) and the sonata An Riobhan Dearg (1939). In 1928 he founded the Scottish Ballet Society (later the Celtic Ballet) with choreographer Margaret Morris. Together they created several ballets, including The Forsaken Mermaid (1940). He was also instrumental in the foundation of the Active Society for the Propagation of Contemporary Music, for which he brought leading composers to Glasgow to perform their work.

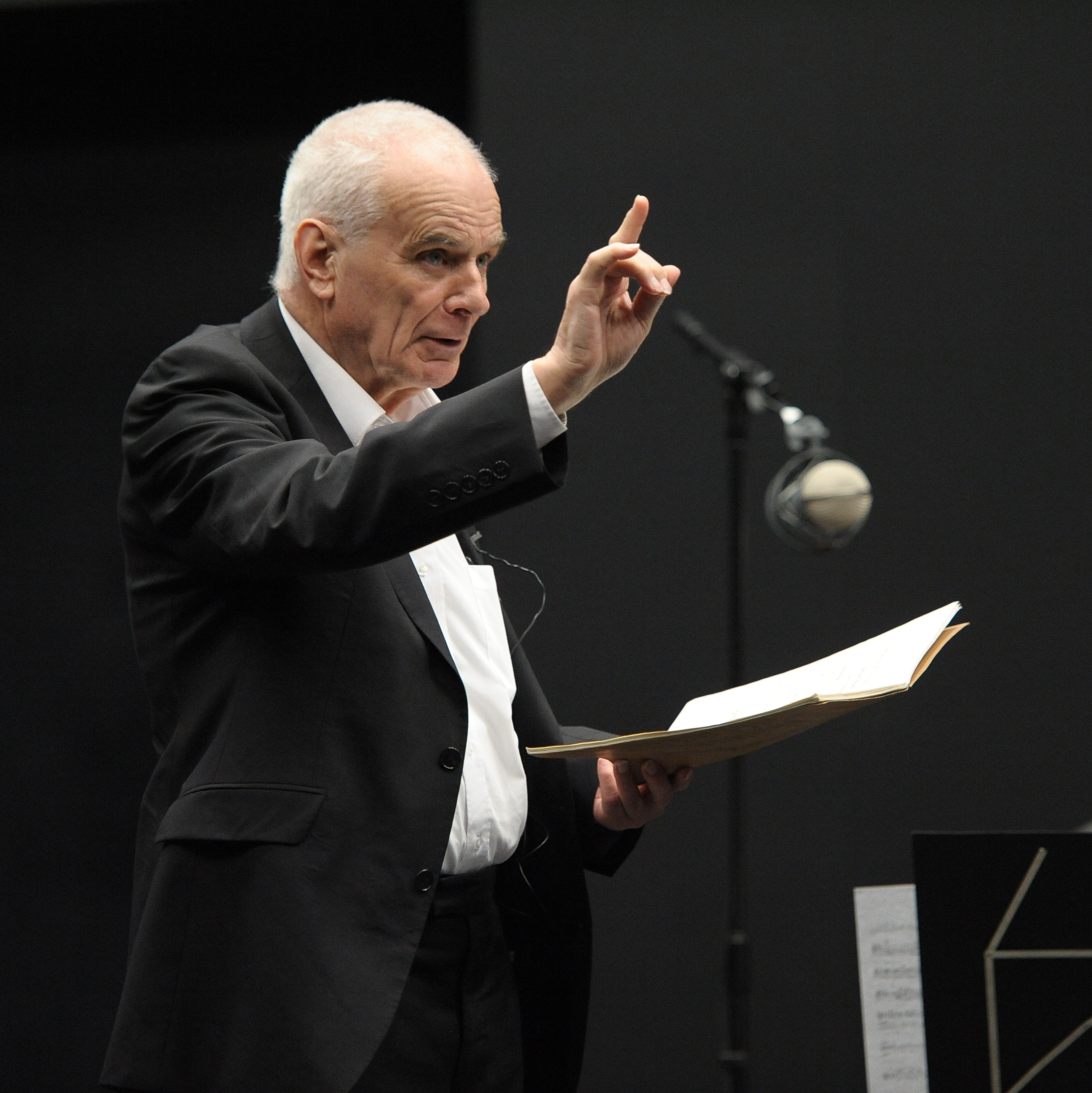
Peter Maxwell Davies

The ideas of the Scottish Renaissance, which sought to develop a distinctly Scottish and modernist approach to the arts and began with the poet Hugh MacDiarmid, were brought to classical music by Francis George Scott (1880–1958), MacDiarmid's former teacher, who adapted several of the poet's works into songs. Lancashire-born Ronald Stevenson (b. 1928) collaborated with Scott and both wrote in 12-tone modernism. Stevenson developed a tonality from Scottish music, creating settings of folk songs including concertos for his instrument the piano (1966 and 1972). He also adapted work by Scottish renaissance poets such as MacDiarmid, Sorley Maclean and William Soutar. The influence of Dmitri Shostakovich (1906–75) was evident in the initials used in his eighty-minute piano work Pasacaglia on D-S-C-H (1963).

The Edinburgh Festival was founded in 1947 as a substitute for festivals at Glyndebourne, Munich and Salzburg, which could not be held in the aftermath of World War II. It rapidly grew in significance and led to an expansion of classical music in Scotland, including the foundation of Scottish Opera in 1960. Scottish composers influenced by Karlheinz Stockhausen (1928–2007) included Iain Hamilton (1922–2000), Thomas Wilson (1927–2001) and Thea Musgrave (b. 1928). Albeit born in Yorkshire, the composer Kenneth Leighton (1929-1988) spent much of his adult life as Reid Professor of Music at the University of Edinburgh. His opera Columba, with libretto by Edwin Morgan (poet), was partly inspired by his love of Iona and the western isles. A native of Lancashire, Salford-born Sir Peter Maxwell Davies (1934-2016), lived on Orkney from the 1970s, and co-founded the St Magnus Festival there. Pieces inspired by, or dedicated to his adoptive home, or Scotland more generally, include Farewell to Stromness (1980), An Orkney Wedding, with Sunrise (1985) (one of the few orchestral pieces to feature a bagpipe solo), Ten Strathclyde Concertos (1986–96) (written for the Scottish Chamber Orchestra and soloists) and the operas The Martyrdom of St Magnus (1977) (inspired by the novel Magnus by George Mackay Brown) and The Lighthouse (1980), based on the Flannan Isles mystery. Davies has been the Scottish Chamber Orchestra's Composer Laureate since 1985. Edward McGuire (b. 1948) has produced large scale works that have earned critical acclaim, including The Loving of Etain (1990). William Sweeney (b. 1950), who has undertaken numerous commissions by the BBC and the Royal Scottish Academy of Music and Drama, was influenced by Stockhausen but also returned to the folk idiom.

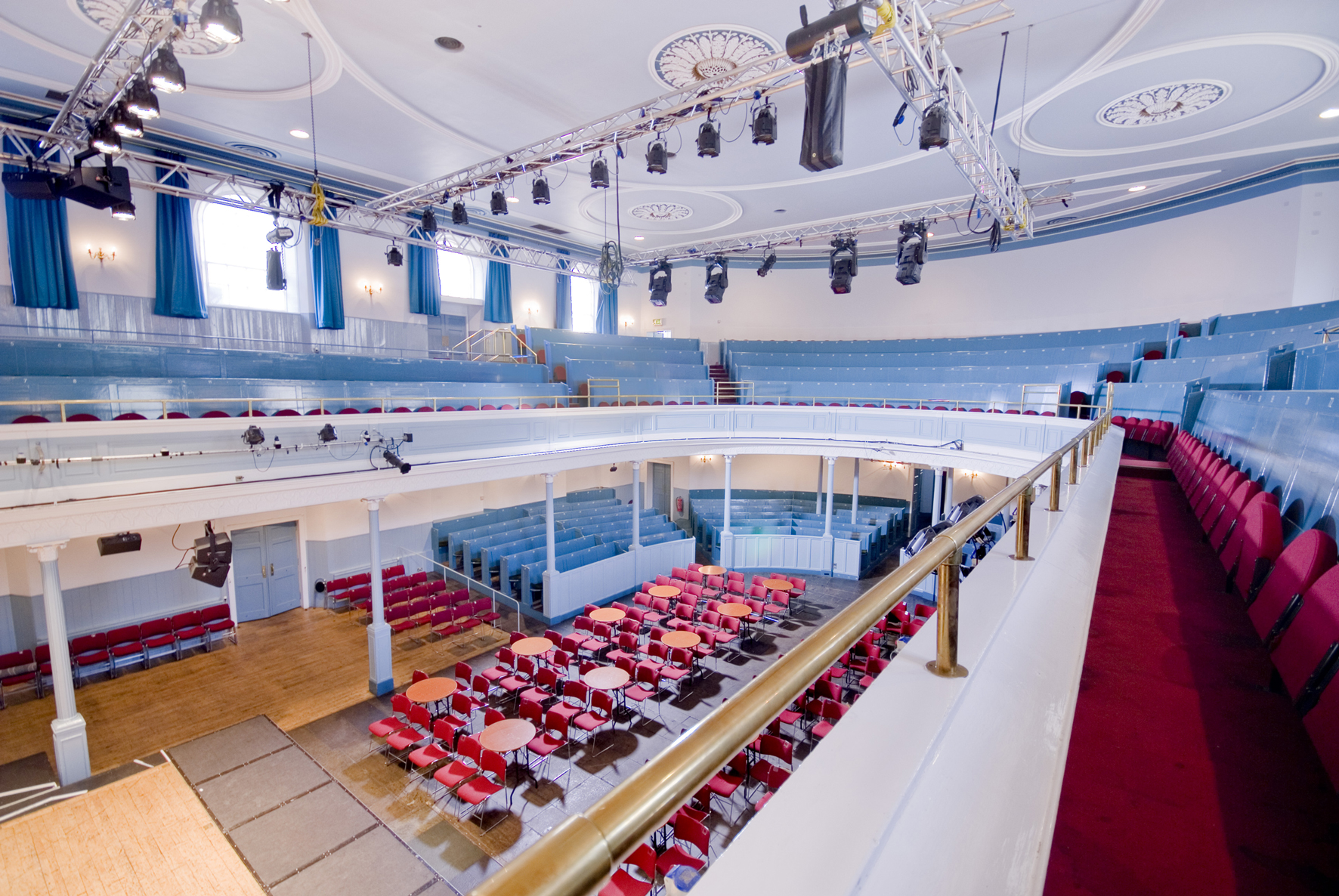
The inside of the auditorium of The Queen's Hall, Edinburgh

James MacMillan (b. 1959) is amongst the leading Scottish composers of the post-war period. Influenced by Polish expressionism, he also incorporates elements of Scottish folk music, as in his The Confession of Isobel Gowdie (1990). His Veni, Veni, Emmanuel (1992) was written for internationally renowned percussionist Evelyn Glennie (b. 1965). Craig Armstrong (b. 1959) has produced music for numerous films, including The Bone Collector (1999), Orphans (2000) and Moulin Rouge! (2001).

== Ensembles and major venues ==
Major Scottish orchestras include: Royal Scottish National Orchestra (RSNO), based in the Glasgow Royal Concert Hall, but often performing in Edinburgh at the Usher Hall; the Scottish Chamber Orchestra (SCO) based at Queen's Hall, Edinburgh and Scotland's oldest full-time orchestra, the BBC Scottish Symphony Orchestra (BBC SSO), based at the City Halls, Glasgow. Scottish Opera is based in at the Theatre Royal, Glasgow, but frequently performs at the Edinburgh Festival. Other ensembles include the Scottish Ensemble, Scottish Fiddle Orchestra, the New Edinburgh Orchestra and the Hebrides Ensemble, which performs its Edinburgh concerts at the Queen's Hall.

== See also ==
- Chronological list of Scottish classical composers
