= David Johnson (Scottish composer) =

Scottish composer and scholar

- Born: David Charles Johnson; 27 October 1942; Edinburgh, Scotland
- Died: 30 March 2009 (aged 66)
- Known for: Musicologist, composer, musician

Dr David Charles Johnson (27 October 1942 in Edinburgh – 30 March 2009 in Edinburgh) was a Scottish composer and a scholar of 18th century Scottish music. Johnson was "an internationally recognised scholar", whose work did much to rediscover and reinvent 18th century Scottish music, and set it in its historical context. Johnson’s work concentrated on the music and wider social life of 18th century lowland Scotland, its influences and tastes, and the key musical figures within it.

== Early life ==
Johnson was born in Edinburgh in October 1942, the eldest of three sons. His father, Sir Ronald Johnson, was a senior civil servant at the Scottish Home and Health Department and organist of the episcopal church of St. Columba’s-By-the-Castle. His mother, Lady Elizabeth, was the Director of the Holst Singers (of Edinburgh) and was organist at Rosslyn Chapel in Midlothian.

Johnson was educated at the Steiner School in Edinburgh, and was musical from a young age, playing recorder, piano and cello, and composing a wide range of pieces for different instruments and having work published while still a school boy. He studied English at Aberdeen University. He then moved to St. John’s College, Cambridge, where he achieved a First in music.

== Scholarship ==
At St. John’s College, Cambridge he completed a Doctoral Thesis under musicologist Charles Cudworth, which led to a 1972 book Music and Society in Lowland Scotland in the 18th Century. This remains a seminal work in its field and "brought to light the synergy between ‘folk’ and ‘art’ music which existed in Baroque and Classical music of Scotland". The book also examined music’s position in 18th century Scottish society, and the work of Thomas Erskine, 6th Earl of Kellie, and other notable composers of the period such as William McGibbon and James Oswald.

Scottish Fiddle Music in the 18th Century followed in 1984, and in it Johnson brought his own editions of a wealth of important works for fiddle, and provided historical commentary and context. A further collection of 27 editions was published in 2000 as Chamber Music of Eighteenth-century Scotland, as part of the Musica Scotica series. Johnson also published a large number of editions through his own publishing house, David Johnson Music Editions, many under the Enlightenment Edinburgh heading.

He also held short-term research and teaching posts at Napier University and Edinburgh University.

== Performance ==
Johnson was a prolific performer and supporter of live music. He formed part of the McGibbon Ensemble, playing cello alongside Edna Arthur (fiddle) and Brice Gould (harpsichord), and performing regularly, including concerts across mainland Europe. The Ensemble also made two path-breaking albums in the 1980s: Music of Classical Edinburgh and Fiddle Pibroch and Other Fancies. Working as Artist Director he also brought a less populist, more challenging side of the songs of Robert Burns to light through two CDs by Scotstown exploring The Art of Robert Burns.

== Compositions ==
Johnson’s output as a composer is not as well known as his scholastic work, and, despite a rich and varied body of performed works, his reputation during his life was predominantly local. His compositions trod what Nigel Osborne described as the ‘path of modesty and truth’, and his output ranged from solo works for recorder (e.g. Music for Hallowe’en, 1960), to five operas (e.g. Thomas the Rymer, 1976), to string quartets, to solo cello suites. Dawn Call for trumpet (1991) was written for John Wallace, while 12 Preludes and Fugues, (1992-1995) was written for Ronald Stevenson. Johnson sought to make his compositions accessible, relevant, offer social commentary and possess a distinctly Scottish flavour. However, his work never reached a wider non-specialist audience.
