= Robert Bremner =

British music publisher

Robert Bremner or Brymer (c. 1713–1789) was a Scottish music publisher. Evidence suggests that he may have been born on 9 September 1713 in Edinburgh to John Brymer and Margaret Urie, and had a younger brother named James, but little else is known about his early life. Bremner established his printing enterprise in Edinburgh in mid-1754 "at the Golden Harp, opposite the head of Blackfriars Wynd". Business was brisk from the start, and by the next year, he was publishing music on behalf of the Edinburgh Musical Society. Bremner later became an agent for the Society, traveling to London and Dublin to search for singers and musicians to feature at its concerts. In 1756, he printed his own The Rudiments of Music, commissioned by the Edinburgh town council as an instruction book for spreading the ideas of the "Monymusk Revival", which was revolutionizing psalm-singing in the Church of Scotland at the time. The third edition of his treatise was published in London in 1763, and was described in the influential Monthly Review of Ralph Griffiths as providing church-goers an easy way to "considerably improve their psalmody, by attending to the very plain and practical rules contained in this judicious tract".

Bremner's business acumen served him well in the late 1750s. He published Nicolò Pasquali's bestseller Thorough-Bass Made Easy in 1757, and took advantage of the rising popularity of the English guitar to print Instructions for the Guitar in 1758. The next year, he published William McGibbon's Scottish tune collections in four volumes, having secured the rights to McGibbon's work upon his death in 1756. During this time, he also displayed his musical prowess by arranging and publishing his Collection of Scots Reels or Country Dances in 1757, which featured the first published strathspeys. His success allowed him to move to London in 1762, opening a shop in the Strand and leaving a manager named John Brysson to run his Edinburgh establishment. That same year, he acquired the Fitzwilliam Virginal Book for ten guineas at the sale of Johann Christoph Pepusch's library and later presented it to Lord Fitzwilliam.

Bremner was once a violin student of Francesco Geminiani, but disagreed with his mentor on the use of vibrato, which Geminiani advocated be used "as often as possible". Bremner's Some Thoughts on the Performance of Concert Music, a preface to his publication of J.G.C. Schetky's 6 Quartettos opus 6 (1777), makes clear his opinions. If vibrato is "introduced into harmony", he writes, "where the beauty and energy of the performance depend upon the united effect of all parts being exactly in tune with each other, it becomes hurtful." Bremner may have even used his publishing position to censor his teacher's opinions. He republished Geminiani's 1751 The Art of Playing on the Violin in 1777, but three passages were left out in the reissue. One of them detailed the "more agreeable" sound provided by vibrato, which Geminiani deemed "the Close Shake".

Bremner died at his home in Kensington Gore. He had married Margaret Bruce on 30 May 1756 in Edinburgh, and had three children: Charles, James, and Ellen. Preston and Son purchased Bremner's London stock, plates, and copyrights, describing the transaction as "not only the most extensive, but also the most valuable list of works ever exhibited in this kingdom". His will left the greater part of his estate to Ellen and £761 13s 1d each to his two sons.
