= James Oswald (composer) =

Scottish composer

James Oswald (baptised 21 March 1710 – 2 January 1769) was a Scottish composer, arranger, cellist, and music publisher, who was appointed as Chamber Composer for King George III and also wrote and published many Scottish folk tunes.

== Life ==
Oswald was born in Crail, Scotland in 1710, being baptised on 21 March, and died in Knebworth, Hertfordshire on 2 January 1769. As a young man he worked in Dunfermline, Fife as a musician and dancing master. Throughout his career he maintained an interest in traditional Scottish music, but he also composed in classical style galant forms.

In 1741 he left Edinburgh, eloping to London with Mary Ann Melvill. The poet Allan Ramsay lamented his departure in "An Epistle to James Oswald". The couple had their first child in 1742 and married on 12 February 1744 in St. James's Church, Piccadilly. They had three daughters. In London Oswald eventually set up his own publishing house and published the Caledonian Pocket Companion, a collection of Scottish folk tunes, some with his own variations. This ran to 12 volumes and many editions.

Like many others whose works feature in the Wighton Collection in Dundee, he was a member of "The Temple of Apollo", a secret musical society of composers in London along with Thomas Erskine, 6th Earl of Kellie, John Reid, Charles Burney and others.

Oswald's first wife, Mary Ann, died in 1756. He married Leonora Robinson Lytton after she was widowed in 1762. Leonora was the aunt of Richard Warburton Lytton.

== Compositions ==
He wrote variations of popular Scottish folk tunes, arranged these for the fiddle and composed other original tunes in the same genre. He published his chamber works under the nom de plume "Dottel Figlio". A "Collection of Minuets" was published in Edinburgh in 1736 and a "Curious Collection of Scots Tunes" in 1740.

The tunes "The East Neuk of Fife" and "The Flowers of Edinburgh", "two classic reel tunes of the Scots fiddle repertory", have been attributed to him - however "The East Noock of Fife" was already in manuscript in 1709, before Oswald's birth, while Flowers of Edinburgh was included in John Walsh's Caledonian Country Dances in about 1737, long before its appearance in Oswald's collection The Caledonian Pocket Companion. Some tunes which were later used for some of Robert Burns's song lyrics, were included in that collection. The earliest version of 'Ae Fond Kiss' was closely modelled on Oswald's tune 'Rory Dall's Port'. It is unsafe to assume that tunes in the Caledonian Pocket Companion, are his compositions unless this is stated explicitly, although some are unknown elsewhere. However, many of the variation sets are his - the title page states that it includes All the Favourite Scotch Tunes ... with Variations by James Oswald.

Later, he wrote a collection of German military music, "40 Marches, Tattoos and Night Pieces for two German flutes, violins or guitars as performed by the Prussian and Hessian Armies".

He was appointed Chamber Composer to George III in 1761, when George became King. Since many of his compositions were written anonymously, research still needs to be done to identify them.

Some of Oswald's most remarkable creations are his two sets of "Airs for the Seasons" – some 96 compositions in all – each named for a different flower or shrub, and attributed to their appropriate season of the year. They are playable by violin (flute, oboe) and cello, with second violin parts available for 12 of them and therefore performable as trios. Contained within the Wighton Collection in Dundee is a manuscript of "Airs for Autumn" in the composer's own hand.

== Selected published works ==
- Caledonian Pocket Companion – being a collection of the most favourite Scotch tunes for the German flute (12 books), by James Oswald, (c. 1760); OCLC 895953938, 701079631, 669763053

Books 1–6, online via Internet Archive (copy: National Library of Scotland)

Books 1–2: London: Printed for J. Simpson in Sweeting's Alley opposite the East Door of the Royal Exchange (Note: "J. Simpson" was John Simpson (1715–1748), proprietor of a music shop in London until his death in 1748. Simpson, on April 2, 1736, in London, married Ann Briscoe (maiden; 1716–1775). John Cox, who on November 10, 1750, in London, married John's widow, Ann, with her, succeeded Simpson as proprietor of the music shop after his death. John Simpson is known for, among other things, having first published "God Save the Queen" in a volume of songs, Harmonica Angelica in 1744. John and Ann's son, James Crutcher Simpson (1743–1813), was a notable violin maker.)
Books 3–6: London: Printed for the author at his music shop on the pavement St. Martin's Church Yard

Books 1–8, online via Internet Archive (copy: Western Libraries, University of Western Ontario)

London: Printed for the author at his music shop on the pavement St. Martin's Church Yard

Book 2, online via National Library of Scotland

London: Printed for the author at his music shop on the pavement St. Martin's Church Yard

Books 7–12, online via Internet Archive (copy: National Library of Scotland)

London: Printed for R. Bremner, opposite Somerset House, Strand

== See also ==
- Scottish Baroque music
- God Save the Queen
