= Classical music of the United Kingdom =

Aspect of British Culture

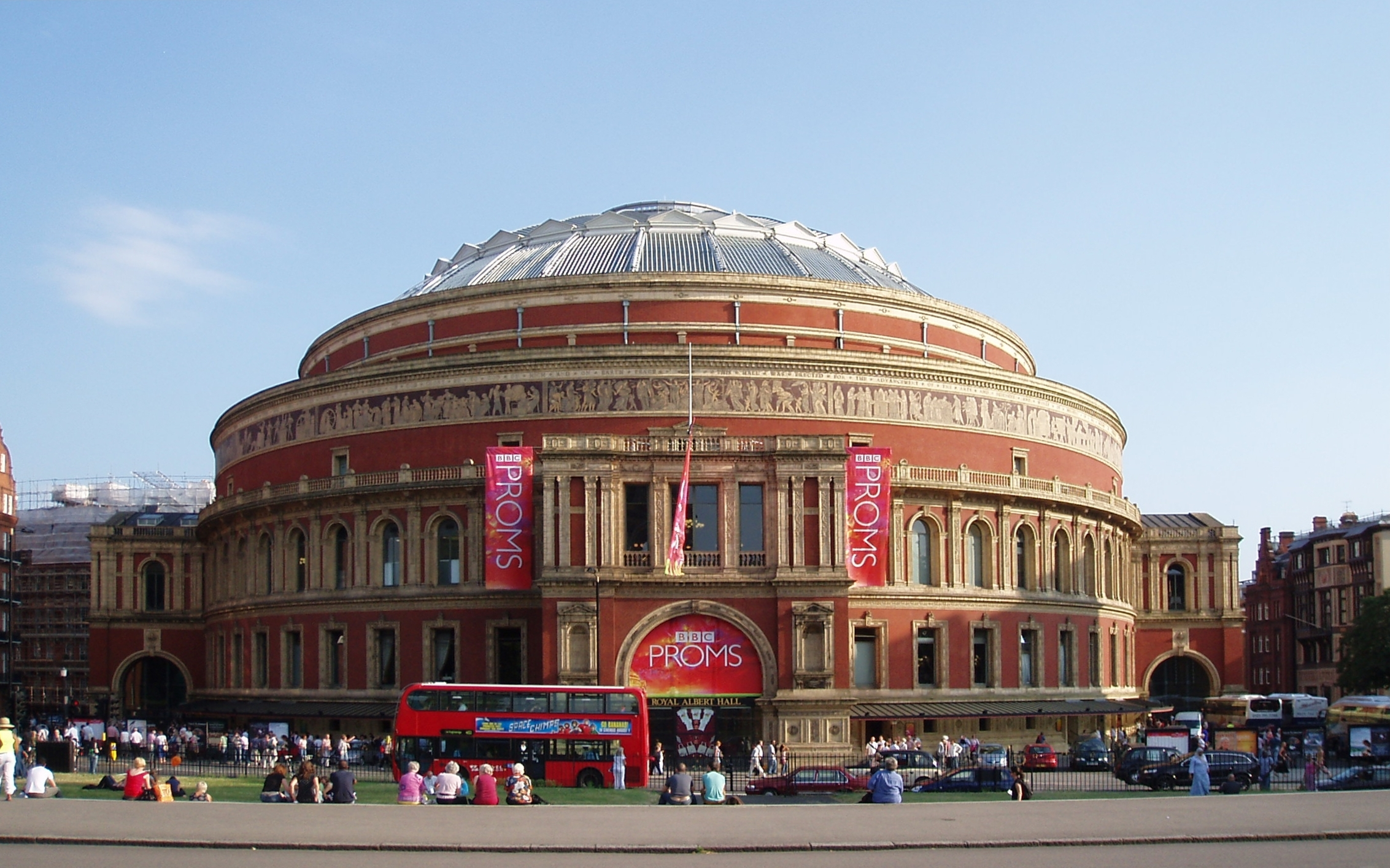
The Royal Albert Hall in London. A major venue for classical and other forms of music.

Classical music of the United Kingdom is taken in this article to mean classical music in the sense elsewhere defined, of formally composed and written music of chamber, concert and church type as distinct from popular, traditional, or folk music. The term in this sense emerged in the early 19th century, not long after the United Kingdom of Great Britain and Ireland came into existence in 1801. Composed music in these islands can be traced in musical notation back to the 13th century, with earlier origins. It has never existed in isolation from European music, but has often developed in distinctively insular ways within an international framework. Inheriting the European classical forms of the 18th century (above all, in Britain, from the example of Handel), patronage and the academy and university establishment of musical performance and training in the United Kingdom during the 19th century saw a great expansion. Similar developments occurred in the other expanding states of Europe (including Russia) and their empires. Within this international growth the traditions of composition and performance centred in the United Kingdom, including the various cultural strands drawn from its different provinces, have continued to evolve in distinctive ways through the work of many famous composers.

== Early and Baroque music ==
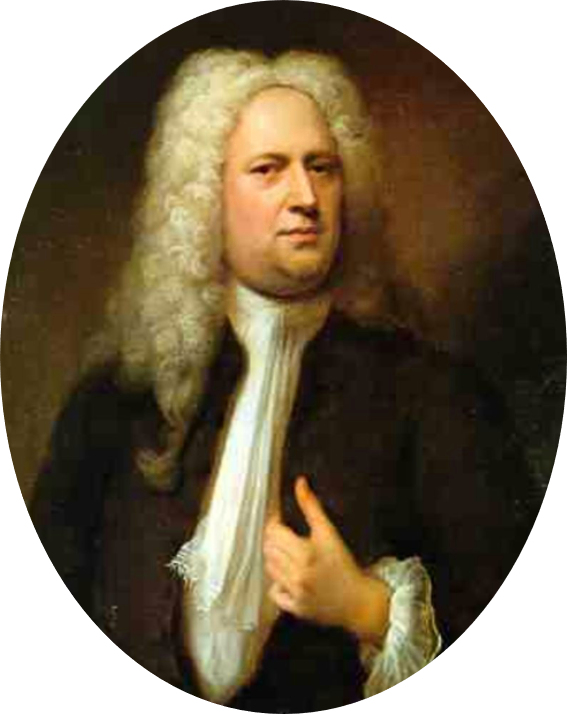
George Frideric Handel was a leading figure of early 18th-century British music.

Music in the British Isles, from the earliest recorded times until the Baroque and the rise of recognisably modern classical music, was a diverse and rich culture, including sacred and secular music and ranging from the popular to the elite. Each of the major nations of England, Ireland, Scotland and Wales retained unique forms of music and of instrumentation, but British music was highly influenced by continental developments, while British composers made an important contribution to many of the major movements in early music in Europe, including the polyphony of the Ars Nova and laid some of the foundations of later national and international classical music. Musicians from the British Isles also developed some distinctive forms of music, including Celtic chant, the Contenance Angloise, the rota, polyphonic votive antiphons and the carol in the medieval era and English madrigals, lute ayres and masques in the Renaissance era, which led particularly to English language opera developed in the early Baroque period. The dominant figure in classical music in the later baroque era, and beyond, was the German-born George Frideric Handel (1685–1759).

== Early nineteenth century ==
With the Act of Union 1800 passed by both the Parliament of Great Britain and the Parliament of Ireland, the United Kingdom of Great Britain and Ireland was formed, and it becomes possible to speak of classical music in the United Kingdom. This was also the period when classical music began to be recognised as an important element of British and Irish culture and to be placed on a more organised basis that could match some of the developments seen in continental Europe. Music in this period has been seen as dominated by continental trends and composers.

=== Major foundations ===
In 1813 the London Philharmonic Society was established, which played an important role in the development of musical life in the kingdom. Founders included Sir George Smart, Johann Baptist Cramer, Muzio Clementi, William Ayrton (musical director of the King's Theatre), William Shield, Henry Bishop, Thomas Attwood (composer and organist of St Paul's Cathedral, and teacher of John Goss), Johann Peter Salomon and Vincent Novello. Under their aegis an annual programme of concerts of international calibre was established. The Society was a commissioning patron of Beethoven's Choral Symphony (No. 9).

Musical training was placed on a newly professional footing by the creation in 1822 of the Royal Academy of Music, which received a royal charter in 1830, which attempted to train British musicians to the same standards as those of the continent. Its first principal was the oratorio composer Dr William Crotch (1775–1847), and the first tutor of piano was Cipriani Potter (1792–1871). Potter was the first London performer of Mozart and Beethoven concerti. He wrote nine symphonies and four piano concerti and as principal from 1832-59 was highly influential in the development of British music and the profession of musician.

The significance of classical music in Ireland, and to a degree its place in conflicting British and Irish identities, was signalled by the foundation of the Dublin Choral Society in 1837, the Irish Academy of Music in 1848 (which was to be granted a royal charter in 1872); and the Royal Choral Institute in 1851 under such figures as Sir Robert Prescot.

=== Performers and composers ===
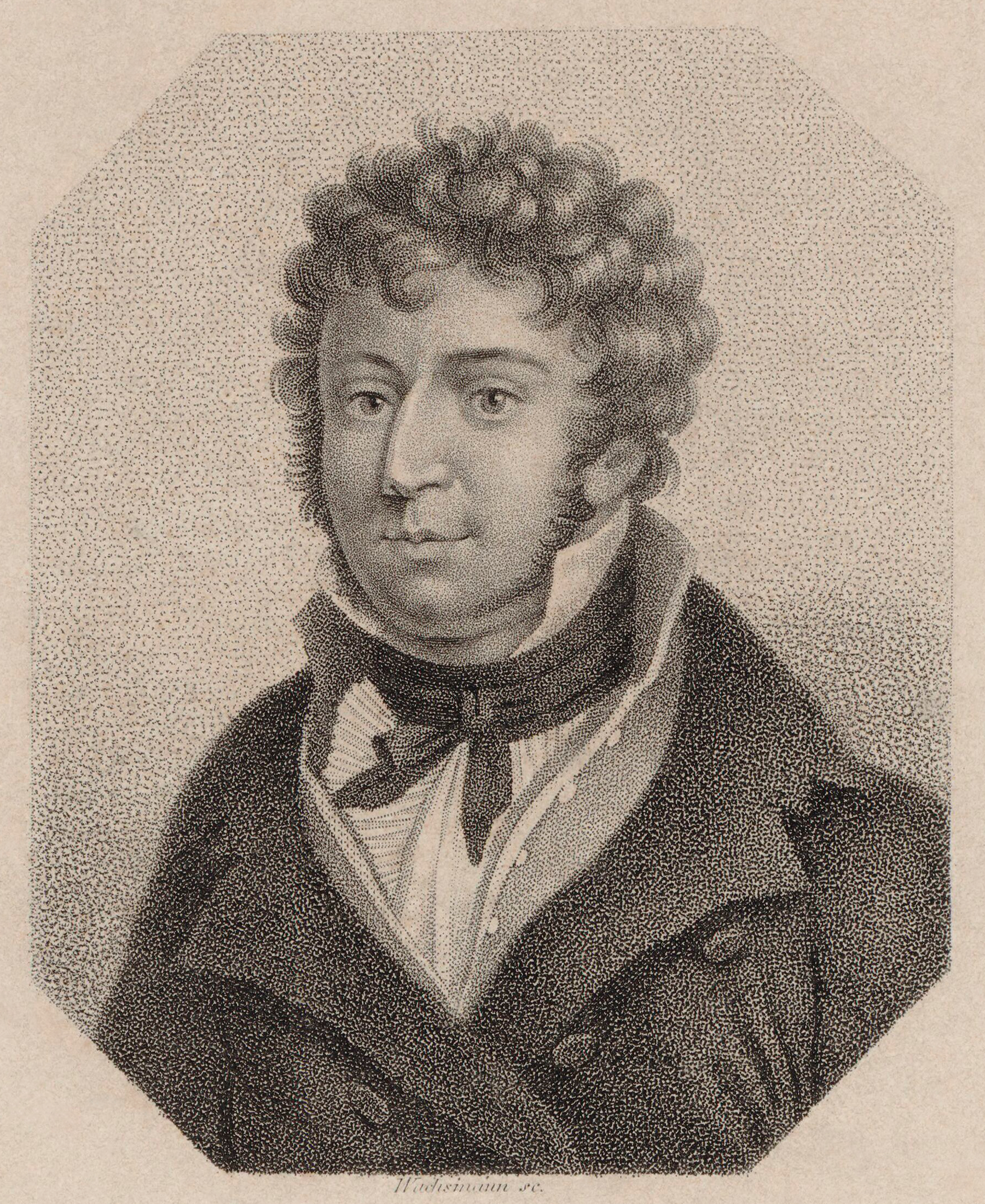
John Field, c. 1820

In the earlier part of the century the British singers Michael Kelly, Nancy Storace and John Braham were prominent and by their example sustained the international opera and oratorio works of Handel, Haydn, Mozart and their successors in the British arena. Braham, whose career thoroughly spanned the opera stage and concert platform, established a tradition in public recital which was continued by his successors down into the early 20th century. Arias or ballads from the English opera became concert standards in recital.

The Irish composer and virtuoso pianist John Field (1782–1837) was highly influential in his style of playing, inventing the nocturne and he is thought to have been an inspiration to Schumann, Chopin and Liszt.

Perhaps the most influential composer of the first half of the 19th century was the German Felix Mendelssohn, who visited Britain ten times for a total of twenty months from 1829. He won a strong following through the Philharmonic Society, sufficient for him to make a deep impression on British musical life. Not only did he compose and perform, but he also edited for British publishers the first critical editions of oratorios of Handel and of the organ music of J. S. Bach. Scotland inspired two of his most famous works, the overture Fingal's Cave (also known as the Hebrides Overture) and the Scottish Symphony (Symphony No. 3). His oratorio Elijah was premièred in Birmingham at the Triennial Music Festival on August 26, 1846. On his last visit to England in 1847 he was the soloist in Beethoven's Piano Concerto No. 4 and conducted his own Scottish Symphony with the Philharmonic Orchestra before Queen Victoria and Prince Albert. A number of British piano students of promise were sent to the Leipzig Conservatory established by Mendelssohn.

== British musical renaissance 1860–1918 ==
Classical music has been seen as undergoing a fundamental shift in focus and importance from the second half of the 19th century, as it began to search for a distinctive national identity or identities and played an increasing role in British cultural life.

=== Performers and composers ===
Native singers shared the dramatic stage with international stars in Italian and German opera, notably Clara Novello, Helen Lemmens-Sherrington, Sims Reeves and Charles Santley. After 1856 the Swedish born Jenny Lind, perhaps the most internationally renowned singer of the era, settled permanently in England, continuing to perform and teach.

Among the most important figures in British classical music in this period was Sir William Sterndale Bennett. A RAM pupil of Potter's, he was a pianist, composer and conductor who for eleven years took control of the Philharmonic Society baton. Lucy Anderson and her pupil Arabella Goddard, with Franklin Taylor, were leading native mid-Victorian pianists.

=== Growth of venues and orchestras ===
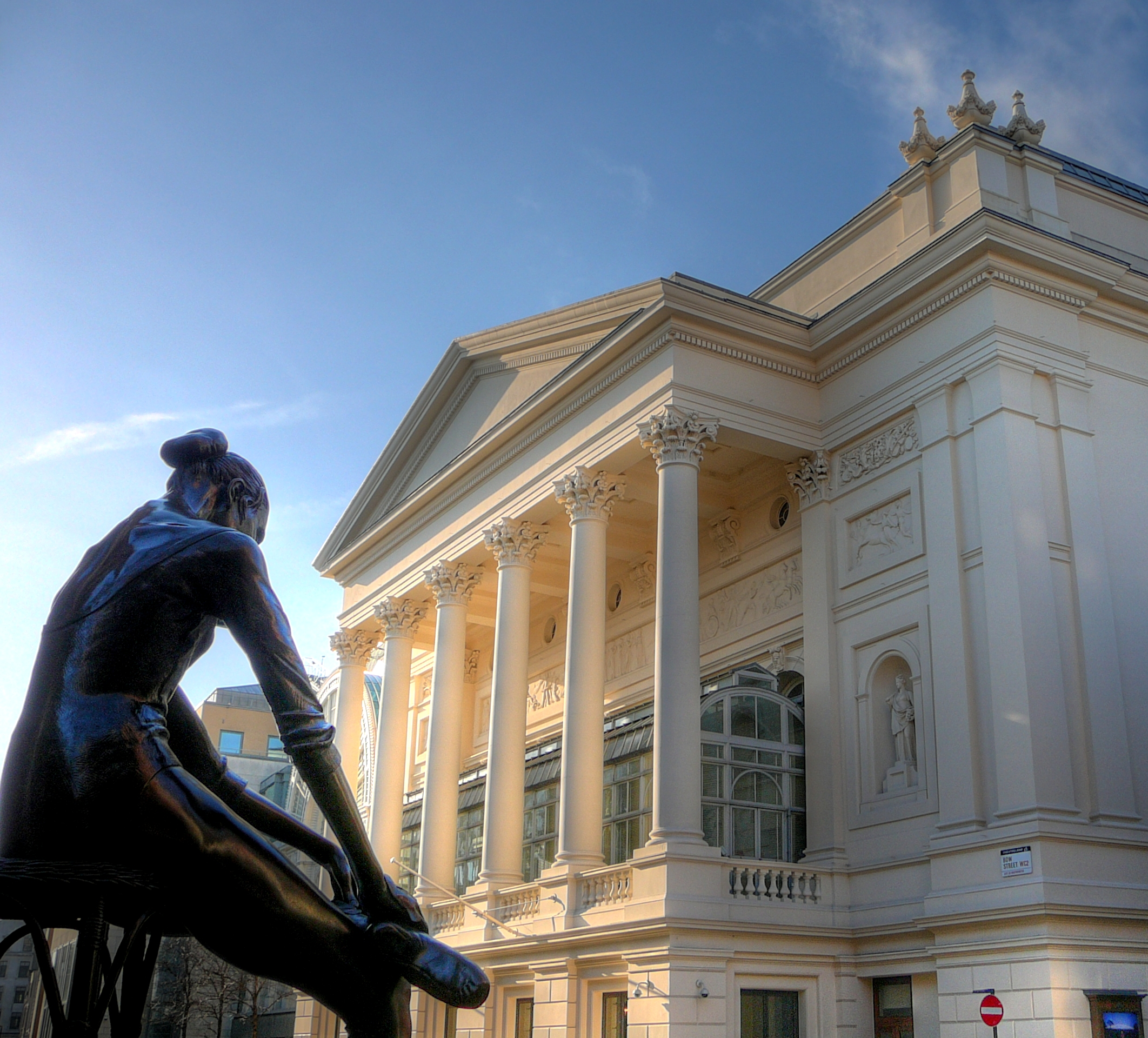
The Royal Opera House, Bow Street frontage, with Enzo Plazzotta's statue 'Young Dancer' in the foreground

This century saw the trend towards larger orchestras and correspondingly larger musical venues, permitting public concerts for mass audiences. The Crystal Palace Concerts were inaugurated in 1855, with August Manns as the principal conductor and the Handel Triennial Festival, an older institution involving massed choirs before vast audiences, was transferred there. Covent Garden's Royal Opera House was opened in 1858, on the site of an earlier theatre and the Royal Albert Hall was built in 1878.

Orchestras which were founded in this period included the Royal Liverpool Philharmonic Orchestra (1840), the Hallé Orchestra at Manchester under Sir Charles Hallé (1858), and the Scottish Orchestra (1891), now the Royal Scottish National Orchestra.

=== English language opera ===
One of the notable features of the mid-19th century is the revival of a tradition of English language opera. Arthur Sullivan, a pupil of Goss, came to public attention in the 1860s with Shakespeare incidental music, The Tempest (1862), The Merchant of Venice (1871), his Irish Symphony (1863–66) and In Memoriam.

The period 1835-1865 saw the height of popularity for the Irish born Michael Balfe (1808–70), composer of The Bohemian Girl (1843), the operas of John Pyke Hullah (1812–84), and the earlier English operas of German-born Sir Julius Benedict (1804–85), including his best-known, The Lily of Killarney (1862). Maritana (1845) was the most famous and ballad-rich of the Irish born William Vincent Wallace's operas. The operas of Frederic Clay (1838–89) were among the most popular of the period, including Ages Ago (1869), The Gentleman in Black (1870) and Happy Arcadia (1872), all written with W. S. Gilbert (1836–1911).

The Savoy opera collaborations between Gilbert and Sullivan began in 1875 with Trial by Jury. They were in the British light opera tradition with spoken dialogue. They reached their heyday in the 1880s with The Pirates of Penzance (1880), and The Gondoliers (1889), and concluded in 1896 with The Grand Duke. They had rivals like Alfred Cellier's (1844–91) Dorothy (1886) and The Mountebanks (1892), but were the most successful operas of the era and have been among the most frequently revived.

=== Religious and mythical works ===
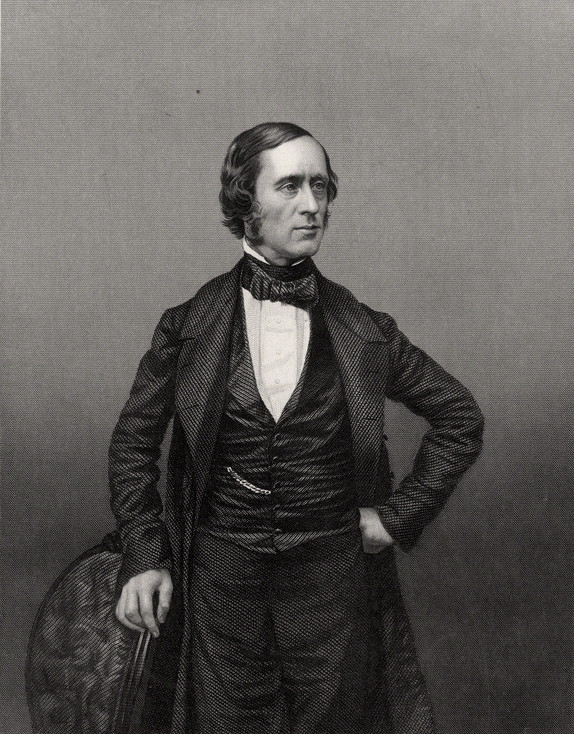
Sir William Sterndale Bennett in 1861

In the later 19th century there was an increasing appetite for large scale works that covered epic, biblical and mythical themes. This was reflected in the topics of operas, cantatas and oratorios, often utilising British poems and novels. These included choral works like William Sterndale Bennett's The May Queen (1858), Ebenezer Prout's Hereward and King Alfred and cantatas like Sullivan and Henry Fothergill Chorley's The Masque at Kenilworth (1864), John Francis Barnett's Ancient Mariner (1867) and Frederic Hymen Cowen's The Rose Maiden (1870) and Harold (1895). Similar trends can be seen in operas such as George Alexander Macfarren's Robin Hood (1860), Sullivan's Ivanhoe (1891) and in the operas of Arthur Thomas, which included Esmeralda (1883) and Nadeshda (1885).

The works of Handel, Mendelssohn and Spohr continued to be a major part of the British musical repertoire but there was an increasing emphasis on religious drama. The Italian-born Sir Michael Costa's Eli (1855) and Naaman (1864) set the pace for the later development in the works of Sullivan, including The Martyr of Antioch (1880) The Light of the World (1873), and The Golden Legend (1886), John Liptrot Hatton's Hezekiah (1877), Joseph Barnby's Rebekah (1870), William Cusins's Gideon (1871), Alfred R. Gaul's The Holy City (1882), Charles Gounod's Redemption (1882) and Mors et Vita (1885) (produced expressly for the British public), and Sir John Stainer's The Crucifixion (1887). Arguably the last of the great English Victorian composers to emerge was Edward Elgar (1857–1934), who during the 1890s produced his Caractacus and King Olaf cantatas, the Enigma Variations in 1899, and the revolutionary Dream of Gerontius in 1900.

=== Late nineteenth-century foundations ===
Between 1880 and 1887 the London Guildhall School of Music was established. The Royal College of Music, originating in a training school under Arthur Sullivan, was founded (1882–83) under Sir George Grove. The Queen's Hall Promenade Concerts, led by Sir Henry Wood were founded in 1895.

A member of teaching staff at the RCM from 1884 and director from 1894 until his death was Sir Hubert Parry (1848–1918), who used it as a platform for creativity and a reformation of British music. His own works included the cantatas Prometheus Unbound (1880) and King Saul (1894), and four symphonies, among them the English (1889). His great contemporary was the Irish-born Sir Charles Villiers Stanford (1852–1924), who was professor of composition at the RCM from 1883; conductor of The Bach Choir from 1886 to 1902; was professor of music at Cambridge from 1887 and conductor of the Leeds Philharmonic Society (1897–1909), and of the Leeds Festival (1901 to 1910). These figures had a profound effect on a generation of composers that included Gustav Holst and Ralph Vaughan Williams.

=== National or pastoral school ===
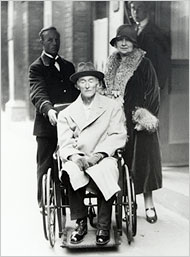
Frederick Delius in 1929

A notable feature of the late 19th century and early 20th century was the birth of the English Pastoral School of classical music. This paralleled similar developments in most European countries, for instance in the music of Smetana, Dvořák, Grieg, Liszt, Wagner, Nielsen and Sibelius. The movement was particularly influenced by the British folk revival through the work of figures such as Sabine Baring-Gould and Cecil Sharp. Examples include the Australian Percy Grainger's Molly on the Shore (1907), Frederick Delius' Brigg Fair (1908), and Ralph Vaughan Williams' English Folk Song Suite (1923) for brass band, as well as subtler references to folk themes in other works including the works of Arnold Bax, George Butterworth, Gustav Holst, Samuel Coleridge-Taylor and John Ireland. Similar developments could be seen in Scotland in the work of Sir Alexander Mackenzie, who celebrated his native Scotland in three Scottish Rhapsodies for orchestra (1880–81, 1911), and in various concerted works for piano or violin and orchestra composed during the 1880s and 1890s. Similarly, John McEwen's Pibroch (1889), Border Ballads (1908) and Solway Symphony (1911) also incorporated traditional Scottish folk melodies.

== Twentieth century ==
Under the Anglo-Irish Treaty of 1921, twenty-six of Ireland's thirty-two counties, including the city of Dublin, were formally separated from the United Kingdom. While the two countries continued to share a classical music heritage, they would now develop on different lines.

In what was now the United Kingdom of Great Britain and Northern Ireland, the outstanding composers of the century included William Walton, Benjamin Britten, Michael Tippett, Lennox Berkeley, and Havergal Brian. Their individual approaches to music and its part in the national identity differed significantly. Walton's work featured fanfares and patriotic themes, including the ceremonial marches Crown Imperial, written for the coronation of King George VI and Queen Elizabeth, and Orb and Sceptre, for that of Queen Elizabeth II. Britten, on the other hand, made a conscious effort to set himself apart from the English musical mainstream, which he regarded as complacent, insular and amateurish. His works included the operas Peter Grimes (1945), and Billy Budd (1951), as well the instrumental compositions Nocturnal after John Dowland for guitar (1964). It is arguable that this trend may have contributed to the revival of interest in early music which has been led, in Britain, by such figures as Arnold Dolmetsch and David Munrow.

In common with other countries, experimental music became an important influence in the 1950s and 1960s, such as on the Manchester School' composers Harrison Birtwistle and Peter Maxwell Davies. This extended to composers working in the avant garde such as Gavin Bryars who embraced improvisation and indeterminancy in their works. Bryar's piece The Sinking of the Titanic is considered one of the key works of experimental music. Bryars also produced works of minimalism and later post-minimalism. Other British composers producing notable works in these styles include Graham Fitkin, Steve Martland, and Michael Nyman.

== Twenty-first century ==
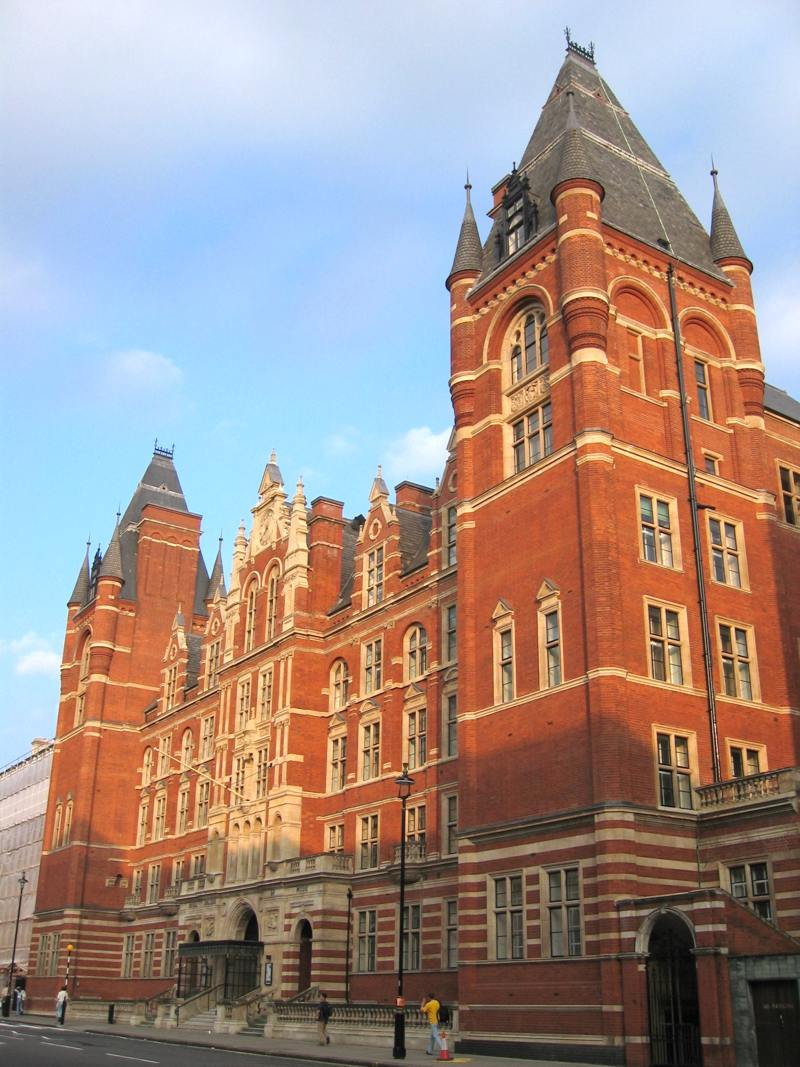
The Royal College of Music from Prince Consort Road, London

In the present era, classical music in Britain must contend and co-exist with a dominant culture of popular music. Specialist music education at establishments such as the Royal Academy of Music, Royal College of Music, Royal Scottish Academy of Music and Drama, Royal Northern College of Music, Royal Birmingham Conservatoire and Guildhall School of Music, Trinity Laban Conservatoire of Music and Dance and the Royal Welsh College of Music & Drama as well as within British Universities provide music teaching to classical musicians.

Notable modern composers include: Peter Maxwell Davies, Harrison Birtwistle, John Tavener, Robin Holloway, George Benjamin, Thomas Adès, Oliver Knussen, James MacMillan, Judith Weir, Peter Seabourne, Alexander Goehr, Jonathan Harvey, Sally Beamish, Julian Anderson, Hugh Wood and at a more popular level Andrew Lloyd Webber, represent very different strands of composition within UK classical music.

== Festivals and venues ==
The United Kingdom is host to many major orchestras, festivals and venues. The Royal Philharmonic Society (founded 1813) and "The Proms" have presented annual music programmes of international status since the early 19th century. The Aldeburgh Festival, founded by Benjamin Britten is another annual musical event of international status.

== See also ==
- Classical music
- Chronological list of Scottish classical composers
