= Janet Beat =

Composer, author and electronic music pioneer

Janet Eveline Beat (born 17 December 1937) is a Scottish composer, music educator and music writer.

== Life ==
Janet Beat was born in Streetly, Staffordshire, England and studied piano privately and horn at the Birmingham Conservatoire (formerly the Birmingham School of Music) before reading music at Birmingham University, graduating with a Bachelor of Music degree in 1960. In 1968 she gained a Master of Arts from Birmingham University.

After completing her studies, she took a position teaching music with the Royal Scottish Academy of Music and Drama. Her music has been performed internationally.

She is one of the women pioneers in electronic music composition in Great Britain for her earliest musique concrete pieces belong to the late 1950s. Daphne Oram was helpful and encouraging here. The influences on her music are diverse and include non-European music as well as the sounds of nature and industry. The use of music technology allowed her to make sonic explorations and the use of microtonality. These influences also enriched her writing for acoustic instruments as in "Study of the Object no 3" (1970) for unaccompanied voices, a graphic score she calls sound sculpture, "Mestra" (1979–80) for solo flutes and "Hunting Horns are Memories" (1977) for horn and tape for which she worked out quarter tone fingerings for the F/B flat double horn. The passage of time also intrigues her and she has experimented with polymetric and polytempi music.

Janet Beat is included in the British Music Collection archive at Heritage Quay, Huddersfield. She is an Honorary Research Fellow of the School of Culture & Creative Arts at the University of Glasgow and an Affiliate of the Hunterian Museum and Art Gallery as a Curatorial Consultant.

== Works ==
Beat composes for instruments, electronic music for tape alone and also for acoustic instruments with tape or computer. She has written for orchestra, chamber ensemble, theatre and film. Selected works include:

- After Reading 'Lessons of the War', a violin and piano sonata inspired by the poems of Henry Reed
- 2 Caprices for solo flute: "Dialogue" and "Krishna's Hymn to the Dawn"
- "Capriccii vol 1" for piano
- "Fanfare for Haydn"
- "Arabesque for guitar"
- "Vincent" Sonata for solo violin
- "5 Projects for Joan" for solo cello
- "Fireworks in Steel" for solo trumpet
- "Concealed Imaginings" for piano quintet
- "String Quartet no 1"
- "Harmony in Autumn" for 4 horns
- "The Splendour Falls.." for 3 trumpets, 3 trombones and tuba
- "En Plein Air" for wind octet
- "Harmony in Opposites" for flute, viola and harp
- "Encounter" for flute, cello and harp (a version of the above)
- "Mexican Night of the Dead" for clarinet and violin
- "Apsara Music 1" for SSA
- "Sylvia Myrtea" for SSAA
- "Canite Tuba" for SATB
- "Piano Sonata"
- 5 Stücke for oboe
- Circe for viola solo (1974)
- Equinox Rituals: Autumn for viola and piano (1996)
- Piano Quintet: The Dream Magus for viola with 2 violins, cello and piano (200
- Gedenkstück für Kaethe for clarinet and viola (2003)
- Study of the object no 3 for female choir

Some of these pieces are published by Furore Verlag, Kassel, Germany.

Unpublished music and recordings are available from The Scottish Music Centre.

She has written professional articles including:

- Monteverdi and the Opera Orchestra of his Time in Arnold, Denis and Fortune, Nigel (eds): The Monteverdi Companion. London: Faber and Faber, 1968
- Two Problems in Carissimi 's Oratorio Jephte, MR 34, 1973
- "An extension of vocal accompaniment to dance", The Laban Art of Movement Guild Magazine, (Nov.1970)
- "The Composer Speaks: Janet Beat on Cross Currents & Reflections", Stretto, vol.4, no 1 [Glasgow,1984]
- Janet Beat & Nick Pearce: "Themes & Variations: A Discussion of Some parallels between Western Music and Chinese Scroll Painting", Notis Musycall, (Glasgow, 2005)
- "Endless Pleasure", The Collector's Art, exhibit catalogue, (Hunterian Art Gallery, Glasgow University, 2009)

== Accolades ==
She won the Cunningham Award in 1962.

In 2019 Beat was awarded the first Scottish Women in Music Lifetime Achievement Award with the award intended to be known in future as the 'Janet Beat SWIM Lifetime Achievement Award'.
