= Shena Fraser =

Scottish composer (1910–1993)

Shena Eleanor Fraser (26 May 1910 – 1993) was a Scottish pianist and composer who also used the pseudonym Sebastian Scott. She was born in Stirling, Scotland, and studied piano performance with Henry Wilson, and composition with Herbert Howells at the Royal College of Music in London. Her debut piano recital was held at the Grotrian Hall, London, in 1934.

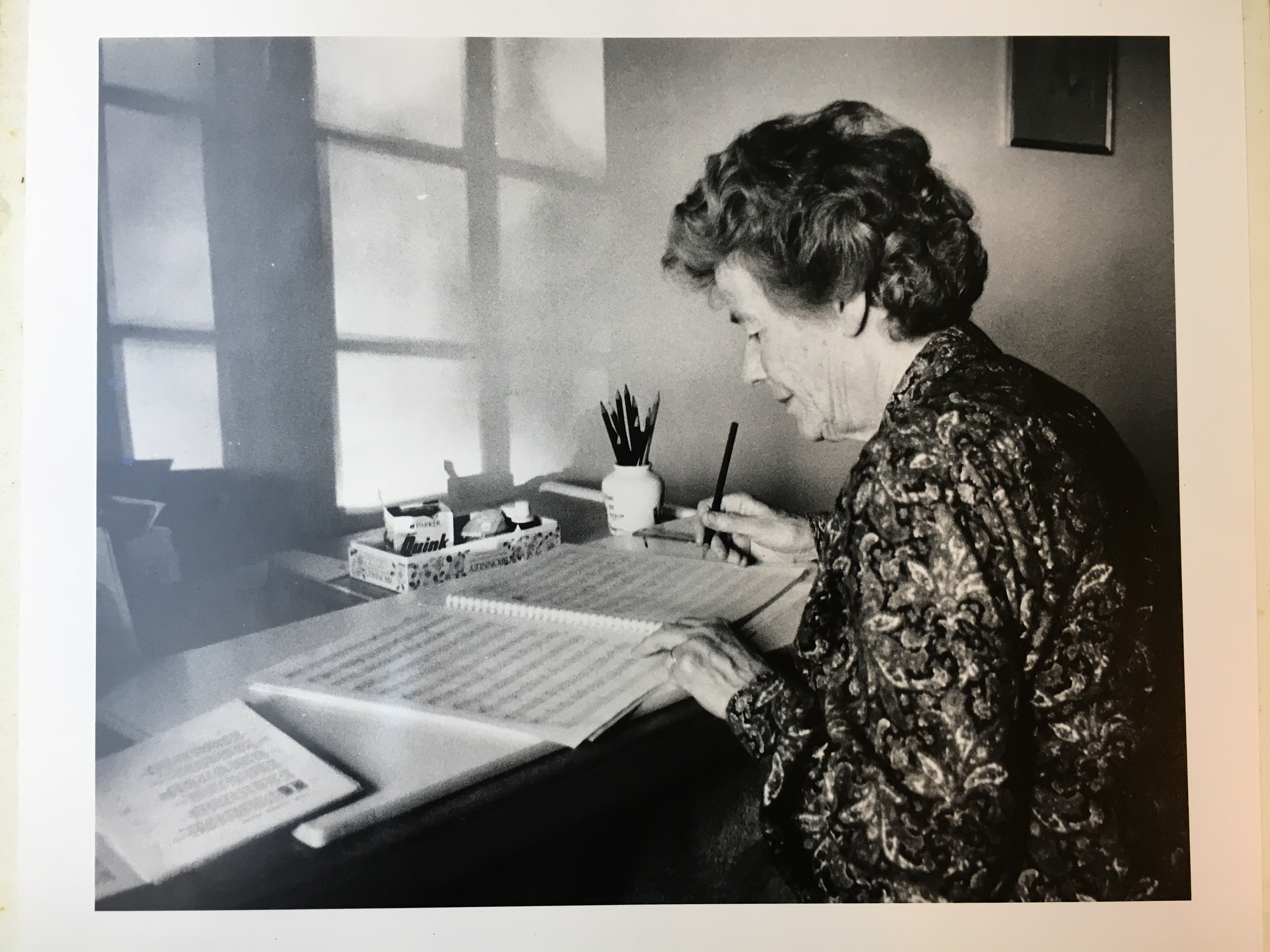
Shena Fraser writing music in her study

Fraser had a lifelong interest in choral music for women and the teaching of amateur and younger musicians. She was also Music Adviser to the National Federation of Women's Institutes for four years and served on Kent Music Committee for many years. Over 100 of her pieces for women's voices, and educational pieces for piano were published. Some of these were jazz pieces written under the name Sebastian Scott.

She founded the Faversham Subscription Concerts Society to assist young performers, and (with piano teacher Yvonne Enoch) set up Fraser-Enoch Publications to publish works by young unknown composers.

The majority of her works are vocal and aimed at amateur performers and choirs. They include Carillon (1957), To Him Give Praise (1959–60), A Ring of Jewels (1975) and A Boy was Born (1988), all for women’s voices. Instrumental works include the Sonatina for flute (1989) and the two Sea Poems for piano duo (1988), which were adapted from her 1972 cantata Full Fathom Five.

Fraser married Laurence Neame, a brewery director from Kent, in 1934. He was Vice Chairman of the Shepherd Neame brewery from the 1940s through to the 1960s. She had three sons, one daughter and fourteen grandchildren. After marriage Fraser taught piano privately and held a weekly Aural Training class for children aged six to eight.

== Works ==
Selected works include:

- A Boy Was Born, SSA women's voices (1979) (Text: Percy Dearmer)
- A Ring of Jewels, song cycle (1975)
- Carillon, song cycle (1957)
- Full Fathom Five, cantata (1972)
- To Give Him Praise, choral suite, SSA women's voices (1959–60)
- Two Unison Songs, song cycle
- A lake and a fairy boat (Text: Thomas Hood)
- Before the paling of the stars (in Carillon) (Text: Christina Georgina Rossetti)
- It is the evening hour (Text: John Clare)
- Margaret has a milking-pail (in Two Unison Songs) (Text: Christina Georgina Rossetti)
- My Boy John (in Full Fathom Five) (Text: Sydney Thompson Dobell)
- On a winter's night long time ago (in Carillon) (Text: Hilaire Belloc)
- Red poppies (Text: William Sharp)
- Requiem (Text: Robert Louis Stevenson) ITA GER
- Sing me a song (Text: Christina Georgina Rossetti)
- The ferryman (Text: Christina Georgina Rossetti)
- To sea (in Full Fathom Five) (Text: Thomas Lovell Beddoes)
- Ferry me across the water as Sebastian Scott (Text: Christina Georgina Rossetti)
- Prelude and Scherzino for oboe and piano (1954)
- Five Pairs, for violin and piano (1959)
- Hornpipe and Jig for two pianos (1954)
- Sea Poems for piano duo (1988)
- Sonatina for flute (1989)
