= James Douglas (composer) =

Scottish composer (1932–2022)

- Born: 4 July 1932; Dumbarton, Scotland
- Died: 1 February 2022 (aged 89); Ullapool, Scotland
- Education: LRAM, ARCM
- Occupations: Composer, Accompanist, Conductor, Recording Artist, Organist, and Teacher
- Style: Classical, Contemporary Atonal
- Spouse: Helen (née Fairweather) Douglas 1968
- Children: 3
- Awards: The Gold Medal Prize at the Compozizione Prize in Arezzo in 1988

James Douglas (4 July 1932 – 1 February 2022) was a Scottish composer, accompanist, conductor, recording artist, and organist.

Douglas was born in Dumbarton, Scotland. He was based in Edinburgh, but he moved to live in North West Scotland in 2006. Douglas has composed a wide variety of music: instrumental, choral, organ, flute, orchestral, wind, brass, and violin.

== Life and career ==
Douglas was born on 4 July 1932. He was educated in Edinburgh, Paris, Munich, Salzburg and London (LRAM and ARCM), and made his debut at Wienersaal (Mozarteum), Salzburg, in 1951.

Douglas worked as a solo piano and organ recitalist and as an accompanist for vocal masterclasses throughout Europe, and he was deputy organist at St. Thomas' Church in Edinburgh from 1948 to 1950. From 1953 to 1963, he was Director of Music at Nicolson Square Church in Edinburgh, then in Mayfield Church in Edinburgh, from 1963 to 1969, at Reid Memorial Church in Edinburgh from 1969 to 1973, and at Christ Church in Edinburgh from 1986 to 1991. He was part of the music staff of the Edinburgh Academy from 1967 to 1979. Douglas was director of the Ensemble 'The Glorious Company' from 2004. Records were made exclusively for Caritas Records (distribution global).

Douglas died at his home in Ullapool, on 1 February 2022, at the age of 89.
