= John Hearne (composer) =

Bririths musician and publisher

John Michael Hearne (born 1937) is a Scottish music publisher, composer, conductor and singer. He was the first Chairman of the Scottish Society of Composers, and was the Chairman of the Scottish Music Advisory Committee of the BBC from 1986 to 1990.

== Notable works ==
- Offeren y Llwyn (1958)
- Piano Sonata (1968)
- Triduum (1968/82)
- Celebrations for Brass Quintet – BBC Wales Commission (1969)
- String Quartet No. 2 (1971)
- Channel Firing – McEwen Commission, Glasgow University. (1979)
- The Four Horsemen – Caledonia Brass Commission (1985)
- Trumpet Concerto – BBC Commission (1990)
- Festival Fanfare – AIYF commission (1991)
- Lætatus Sum – joint winner Gregynog Award. (1992)
- Nocturne, Aubade & Rondeau, Latin Lyrics from Carmina Burana (1989/94)
- De Profundis – University of Aberdeen 500th anniversary commission (1995)
- Bottom's Dream – Hebrides Ensemble commission. (1995)
- A Legend of Margaret – commissioned by St Margaret's School, Aberdeen, (1996)
- Quintet for Alto Saxophone and String Quartet (1997)
- Ljos (1998)
- Into Uncharted Seas (2001)
- The Ben
