= William Sweeney (composer) =

Scottish composer

William John Sweeney (born 5 January 1950) is a Scottish composer. He is Emeritus Professor of Music at the University of Glasgow.

== Biography ==
Born in Glasgow, he attended Knightswood Secondary School. He studied the clarinet and composition at the Royal Scottish Academy of Music and Drama from 1967 to 1970, and at the Royal Academy of Music from 1970 to 1973, where his teachers included Alan Hacker and Harrison Birtwistle. He went on to teach woodwind instruments, and then composition at the University of Glasgow. An early influence was the European avant-garde, particularly Karlheinz Stockhausen, though he returned to tonal composition in the mid-1970s.

His work is strongly influenced by traditional Scottish folk music; in particular, he has utilised the heterophonic style of Gaelic psalm-singing, and the piobaireachd form; he varies melodies through ornamentation, as in traditional pibroch, and in their contour; he modifies instruments' tone-colours through alternative fingerings. He has engaged with texts by a number of Scottish writers, including George Buchanan, Robert Fergusson, William Soutar, Hugh MacDiarmid and Sorley MacLean.

In 1991, he was commissioned by Glasgow's Mayfest to set Hugh MacDiarmid's A Drunk Man Looks to a Thistle to music to mark the centenary of the poet's birth. The work was first performed in May 1992 and later included in a three-hour radio programme broadcast by BBC Scotland.

Sweeney has a strong regard for the music of Leoš Janáček. He has also addressed the reconciliation of classical and traditional music with jazz, using improvisational techniques and sometimes combining the two idioms. He has been influenced by ancient Greek poetry, and Indian and Arab traditions in his use of ostinato and other techniques of varied repetition.

His Sonata for cello and piano (2010) won the 2011 British Composer Award in the "Instrumental Solo or Duo" category.

== Selected works ==
=== Opera ===
- An Turus, opera in 3 acts, 1997; libretto by Aonghas MacNeacail

=== Orchestral ===
- Maqam, 1984
- Glasgow, 1985
- Sunset Song, 1986
- Cumha, 1987
- Seann Orain, 1989
- Air, Strathspey and Reel, 1990
- Concerto Grosso, for 9 clarinets, strings and timpani, 1990
- St. Blane's Hill, 1991
- A Set for the Kingdom, for string orchestra, 1991
- October Landscapes, 1993
- Birth/Procession, 1993
- The Lost Mountain (A-bheinn Air Chall), for wind band, 1996
- Sweeney Astray, 1996

=== Concertante ===
- Ceol-Beag, for cello and orchestra, 1981
- An rathad ùr, for saxophone and orchestra, 1989

=== Chamber music ===
- String Quartet, 1981
- Trio for clarinet, viola and piano, 1982
- Sonata for viola, marimba and claves, 1985
- Sweeney Astray, for 2 clarinets, 1987, or for clarinet and viola, 2003
- String Quartet No. 3, 2004–2007
- Sonata for cello and piano, 2010
- The Ballad of the Cat and the Ram, for violin and piano

=== Choral ===
- Salm an Fhearainn, 1987
- An Seachnadh, 1988
- I Will Wait, 1990
- Two Lyrics, 1992
- Airc an dualchais, 1998

=== Multimedia ===
- Tantallon! These Lands, This Wall, 2012

=== Songs ===
- 3 Poems from Sangschaw, 1977
- The Heights of Macchu Picchu, 1988
- El Pueblo, 1989
- A Drunk Man Looks at the Thistle, 1992
- An Coilltean Ratharsair (The Woods of Raasay), 1993
- Seeking Wise Salmon, 1994
- All That Came in That One Coracle, 1999

== Sources ==
- Mackay, Neil. 'William Sweeney's an seachnadh'. Tempo, new series, no. 188 (Scottish Issue, March 1994): 58.
- Morris, Francis J. 'Sweeney, William (John)', Grove Music Online, ed. L. Macy (Accessed 2007-06-07),
- Reid-Baxter, James. 'William Sweeney and the Voice of the People'. Tempo, new series, no. 188 (Scottish Issue, March 1994): 26–30.
