= William McGibbon =

Scottish composer and violinist

William McGibbon (April 1690, in Glasgow, Scotland – 3 October 1756) was a Scottish composer and violinist.

== Life ==
Eighteenth-century sources disagree about many details of his life, and consequently his early life is shrouded in uncertainty. He was probably born in Glasgow, the child of the violinist Duncan McGibbon and his wife Sarah Muir, although earlier sources say he was born in Edinburgh. He may have studied in London under William Corbett, and may have travelled in Italy in his youth, possibly with Corbett. He seems to have settled in Edinburgh in the 1720s.

He died in 1756, and left his estate to the Edinburgh Royal Infirmary.

== Career ==
He was the principal violinist of the Edinburgh Musical Society orchestra from 1726 until his death.

Although a prolific composer, particularly for the flute, recorder and fiddle, only a few of his works are now known. Grove says they "vary in quality"; his early work shows influences of Corelli, Handel, Veracini, and Purcell, while after 1740 he produced many settings of Scottish tunes, which were then very popular, but still show an Italian influence.

== See also ==
- Scottish Baroque music
