= Thomas Erskine, 6th Earl of Kellie =

British peer and composer

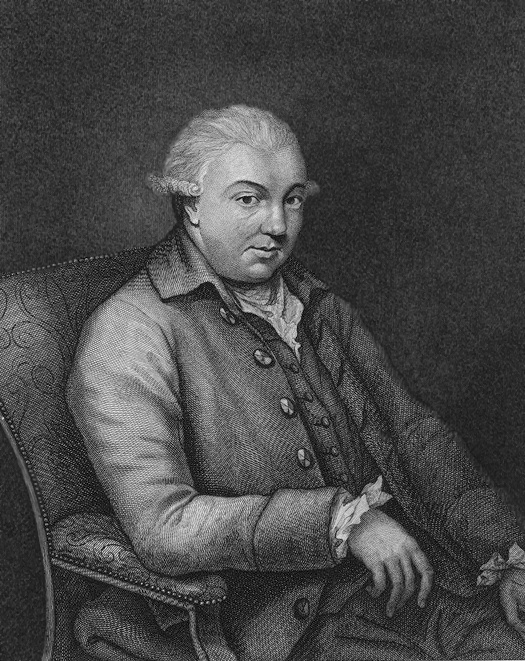
The Earl of Kellie.

Thomas Alexander Erskine, 6th Earl of Kellie (1 September 1732 – 9 October 1781), styled Viscount Fentoun and Lord Pittenweem until 1756, was a Scottish musician and composer whose considerable talent brought him international fame and his rakish habits notoriety, but nowadays is little known. Recent recordings of his surviving compositions have led to him being re-evaluated as one of the most important British composers of the 18th century, as well as a leading exponent of Scotland's music.

== Life ==
His father Alexander Erskine, 5th Earl of Kellie, was incarcerated at Edinburgh Castle for supporting the Jacobites in the Jacobite rising of 1745. His mother, Janet Pitcairn, was the daughter of a celebrated physician and poet. Born in Edinburgh, Thomas attended the Royal High School before leaving around 1752 for Mannheim in Germany to study under the elder Johann Stamitz. After his father's death in 1756, Alexander returned to Scotland as a virtuoso violinist and composer, nicknamed "Fiddler Tam".

He began propagating the modern Mannheim style, of which he was to become widely acknowledged as the leading British exponent. Six of his three-movement "Overtures" (Symphonies) were published in Edinburgh in 1761. James Boswell borrowed five guineas from Erskine on 20 October 1762, and on 26 May 1763 took him on a visit to Lord Eglinton's in London, where the overture the Earl composed for the popular pastiche The Maid of the Mill (at Covent Garden in 1765) became exceptionally popular. In 1767 the Earl returned to Scotland, where he became a leading light of the Edinburgh Musical Society, acting as deputy governor, and as an able violinist directed the concerts in St Cecillia's Hall in Niddry Street (formerly Niddry's Wynd), Edinburgh.

An active Freemason, he was elected the fourth Grand Master of the Grand Lodge of the Ancients at London in 1760 and served in that office for six years. He also served as the twenty-fourth Grand Master Mason of the Grand Lodge of Scotland from 1763 to 1765.

In addition to his musical and social pursuits, Thomas Erskine was actively involved in the intellectual circles of his time. His friendship with prominent figures such as James Boswell and his contributions to the Edinburgh Musical Society solidified his position as a key cultural figure in 18th-century Scotland. His influence extended beyond music, contributing to the broader cultural and intellectual landscape of the Scottish Enlightenment.

In 1775, while returning from a continental trip, Thomas almost died in a shipwreck off of the English Channel. The tale was captured in the following poem which is believed to have been written by Thomas' kinsman Henry Erskine.

"In ancient story this I've found,
That no Musician e'er was drown'd.
A harp was then, or I mistake it,
Much better than the best cork-jacket;
…
'Twas thus the tuneful Peer of Kelly
Escap'd some whale's enormous belly;
And safe in London, thinks no longer
He'll prove a feast for shark or conger."

His dissolute lifestyle extended to founding an (all-male) drinking club, and reportedly the playwright Samuel Foote advised Kellie to put his red nose into his greenhouse to ripen his cucumbers! He tended to compose on the spot and absent-mindedly give music away without further thought for it. His health suffered and he visited Spa, Belgium, but while returning was "struck with a paralytic shock" and while stopping for a few days at Brussels was attacked by a "putrid fever" and died.

== Succession ==
His brother the Hon. Archibald (b. 22 Apr 1736; d.8 May 1797) became 7th Earl of Kellie, but he died unmarried with no heir. The title went to the 7th Earl's third cousin once removed, Charles Erskine, 8th Earl Kellie, whose father, also named Charles Erskine (1730-1790), was 6th Baronet of Cambo (one of the Erskine Baronets) and the son of David Erskine, Lyon-Clerk who died 7 Oct 1769. Another of David's sons, was Thomas Erskine, 9th Earl of Kellie. When the 9th Earl died in 1828, his brother, Methven Erskine became 10th Earl Kellie.

== Compositions ==
Minuet in A by Thomas Erskine, played by Jan Waterfield on the square piano

Erskine composed the Overture to Isaac Bickerstaff's comic opera, The Maid of the Mill, which was performed at the Theatre Royal, Covent Garden early in 1765.

Until the 1970s only a small number of his compositions was thought to survive, though the discovery in 1989 of two manuscripts containing chamber works at Kilravock Castle has doubled the number of his surviving compositions – notably with nine trio sonatas and nine string quartets. Interest in him was recently revived by John Purser, among others, and a CD of his works has now been made.

List of compositions

- Sinfonia a Quattro in G major
- Sinfonia a Quattro in D major
- Quartet in C minor (I. Allegro, II. Andante, III. Allegro)
- Quartet in A Major (I. Allegro molto, II. Adagio, III. Minuet)
- Minuet
- The Favourite Minutes (1. Lady Betty Stanley's Minuet)
- Overture in C major, Op. 1, No. 2 (I.???, II. Andantino, III. Presto assai)
- Overture in B Flat 'The Maid o the Mill' - (I. Allegro, II. Adagio ma non troppo, III. Minuet (Rondo)
- Periodical Overture No. 16
- Periodical Overture No.17 in E-Flat Major (Andantino, Allegro con spirito, Presto)
- Death Is Now My Only Treasure
- The Lover's Message
- Lord Kelly's Reel
- Tio Sonata No. 5 in E (I. Andante con espressione, II. Minuetto)
- Trio Sonata No. 6 in G (I. Andantino, II. Tempo di Minuetto)

== Reception ==
His reputation was well represented in his obituaries in Scots Magazine and Gentleman's Magazine, though the two magazines cannot agree on the day on he died. Gentleman's magazine described him as follows: 'one of the finest musical composers of the age, and esteemed by the cognoscenti as the first man of taste in the musical line, of any British subject... He loved his bottle, but was a worthy social character.'

== Ancestry ==
Ancestors of Thomas Erskine, 6th Earl of Kellie

8. Alexander Erskine, 3rd Earl of Kellie
4. Alexander Erskine, 4th Earl of Kellie
9. Lady Mary Dalzell
2. Sir Alexander Erskine
10. Colin Lindsay, 3rd Earl of Balcarres
5. Lady Anne Lindsay
11. Lady Jean Carnegie
1. Sir Thomas Alexander Erskine
12. Alexander Pitcairn
6. Dr. Archibald Pitcairn
13. Janet Sydserff
3. Lady Janet Pitcairn
14. Archibald Stevenson
7. Elizabeth Stevenson

Masonic offices
Preceded by The Earl of Blessington	Grand Master of the Antient Grand Lodge of England; 1760–1766	Succeeded by Hon. Thomas Mathew
Preceded by The Earl of Elgin	Grand Master of the Grand Lodge of Scotland; 1763–1765	Succeeded by James Stewart
Peerage of Scotland
Preceded by Alexander Erskine	Earl of Kellie; 1756–1781	Succeeded by Archibald Erskine
