= Festivals in Scotland =

Scotland hosts on average 200 festivals per year, ranging from cultural, musical and arts. The Edinburgh Fringe Festival is the world's largest arts festival, and the country is also renowned for its hosting and organisation of sporting festivals and cultural events. Considered the birthplace of golf, Scotland has hosted The Open Championship tournament 97 times, more than any other country, and hosted international sporting events such as the Commonwealth Games three times.

Below is a list of some festivals in Scotland, either held annually or occasionally, as well as international sporting fixtures of which Scotland has been the sole host nation, or part of a joint–hosting duty.

== Annual festivals in Scotland ==
- 25 January: Burns Night
- 6 April: Tartan Day
- May–September: Highland Games
- 27 May-4 June: Children's Festival
- 14–23 July: Jazz and Blues Festival
- August: Edinburgh Festivals (Edinburgh Fringe Festival, Edinburgh Military Tattoo)
- 30 November: St Andrew's Day
- 31 December: Hogmanay
- 17 May - 3 June Six Cities Design Festival

== Types of festivals ==
=== Religious ===
- Beltane Fire Festival

=== Sports ===
==== Highland Games ====
- Cowal Highland Gathering
- Crieff Highland Games
- Dinnie Stones
- The Gathering 2009
- Highlander Challenge World Championships
- Inverness Highland Games

==== Commonwealth Games host nation ====
- Edinburgh – 1970 British Commonwealth Games
- Edinburgh – 1986 Commonwealth Games
- Glasgow – 2014 Commonwealth Games

==== International football competition hosts ====
- 1888 World Championship (football)
- 1889 World Championship (football)
- 1970 UEFA European Under-18 Championship
- 1985 Rous Cup
- 1986 FIFA World Cup qualification (UEFA–OFC play-off)
- 1987 Rous Cup
- 1988 Rous Cup
- 1989 FIFA U-16 World Championship
- 1989 Rous Cup
- 1998 UEFA European Under-16 Championship
- Football at the 2005 Island Games – Men's tournament
- 2010 CPISRA Football 7-a-side European Championships
- Football at the 2012 Summer Olympics
- 2019 UEFA Women's Under-19 Championship
- UEFA Euro 2028
- British Home Amateur Championship
- British Home Championship
- Football World Championship
- Four Nations Tournament (1979–2008)
- Victory Shield
- 1901–02 World Championship (football)
- UEFA Euro 2020
- 2019 UEFA Women's Under-19 Championship

==== Rugby World Cup hosts ====
- 1991 Rugby World Cup
- 1994 Women's Rugby World Cup
- Six Nations Championship

=== Golf ===
- The Open Championship
  - Prestwick Golf Club – 1860, 1861, 1862, 1863, 1864, 1865, 1866, 1867, 1868, 1869, 1870, 1872, 1875, 1878, 1881, 1884, 1887, 1890, 1893, 1898, 1903, 1908, 1914, 1925
  - Old Course at St Andrews – 1873, 1876, 1879, 1882, 1885, 1888, 1891, 1895, 1900, 1905, 1910, 1921, 1927, 1933, 1939, 1946, 1955, 1957, 1960, 1964, 1970, 1978, 1984, 1990, 1995, 2000, 2005, 2010, 2015, 2022
  - Musselburgh Links – 1874, 1877, 1880, 1883, 1886, 1889
  - Muirfield – 1892, 1896, 1901, 1906, 1912, 1929, 1935, 1948, 1959, 1966, 1972, 1980, 1987, 1992, 2002, 2013
  - Royal Troon Golf Club – 1923, 1950, 1962, 1973, 1982, 1989, 1997, 2004, 2016
  - Carnoustie Golf Links – 1931, 1937, 1953, 1968, 1975, 1999, 2007, 2018
  - Turnberry – 1977, 1986, 1994, 2009

=== Sports and cultural ===
- Fort William Mountain Festival

=== Arts ===
- Aberdeen Alternative Festival
- Aberdeen International Youth Festival
- Craigmillar Festival Society
- Cupar Arts Festival
- Edinburgh Annuale
- Edinburgh Art Festival
- Edinburgh International Magic Festival
- Edinburgh Mela
- Edinburgh People's Festival
- Fèis Bharraigh
- GENERATION: 25 Years of Contemporary Art in Scotland
- Glasgay! Festival
- Glasgow International
- Glasgow International Comedy Festival
- Inverness Fringe Festival
- Edinburgh festivals
- Mòd
- St Magnus Festival
- Syn Festival Edinburgh

==== Film festivals ====
- Alchemy Film & Moving Image Festival
- Ballerina Ballroom Cinema of Dreams
- Celtic Media Festival
- Deep Fried Film Festival
- Screenplay Film Festival
- SQIFF
- Africa in Motion
- Dead by Dawn
- Edinburgh Greek Festival
- Edinburgh International Film Festival
- Edinburgh Mountain Film Festival
- Edinburgh Spanish Film Festival
- Italian Film Festival
- Scotland Loves Animation
- The Scottish Short Film Festival
- Glasgow Film Festival
- GLITCH Film Festival
- Southside Film Festival (Glasgow)

=== Literary festivals ===
- Aye Write
- Bloody Scotland
- Edinburgh International Book Festival
- Lennoxlove House
- Mòd
- Royal National Mòd
- West Port Book Festival
- Wigtown
- Wigtown Book Festival
- Word – University of Aberdeen writers festival

=== Comedy festivals ===
- Edinburgh Comedy Festival
- Edinburgh Festival Fringe
- The Free Edinburgh Fringe Festival
- Glasgow International Comedy Festival

=== Music festivals ===
- Aberdeen and NE Scotland Music Festival
- Aberdeen International Youth Festival
- Argyllshire Gathering
- Big Beach Busk
- Big Burns Supper Festival
- Big in Falkirk
- Callander Jazz and Blues Festival
- Celtic Connections
- Connect Music Festival
- Darvel Music Festival
- Eden Festival
- The Edge Festival
- Edinburgh International Harp Festival
- Fèis Bharraigh
- Fingask Castle
- Give it a Name
- Glasgow International Jazz Festival
- Glasgow Summer Sessions
- Hebridean Celtic Festival
- Isle of Skye Music Festival
- Killin Music Festival
- Knockengorroch
- Leith Festival
- Let's Rock
- List of festivals in Glasgow
- Live at Loch Lomond
- Loopallu Festival
- Mòd
- Montrose Music Festival
- Musica Nova Festival, Glasgow
- Northern Meeting
- The Outsider Festival
- Perthshire Amber
- Piping Live! Festival
- Rewind Festival
- RockNess
- Royal Edinburgh Military Tattoo
- St Magnus Festival
- Skye Live Festival
- Southside Fringe Festival
- Tiree Music Festival
- TRNSMT
  - TRNSMT festival lineups
- Wickerman Festival

== See also ==
- Culture in Scotland
- Sport in Scotland
- Music of Scotland
- Cinema of Scotland
