= Eden Festival =

Scottish music festival

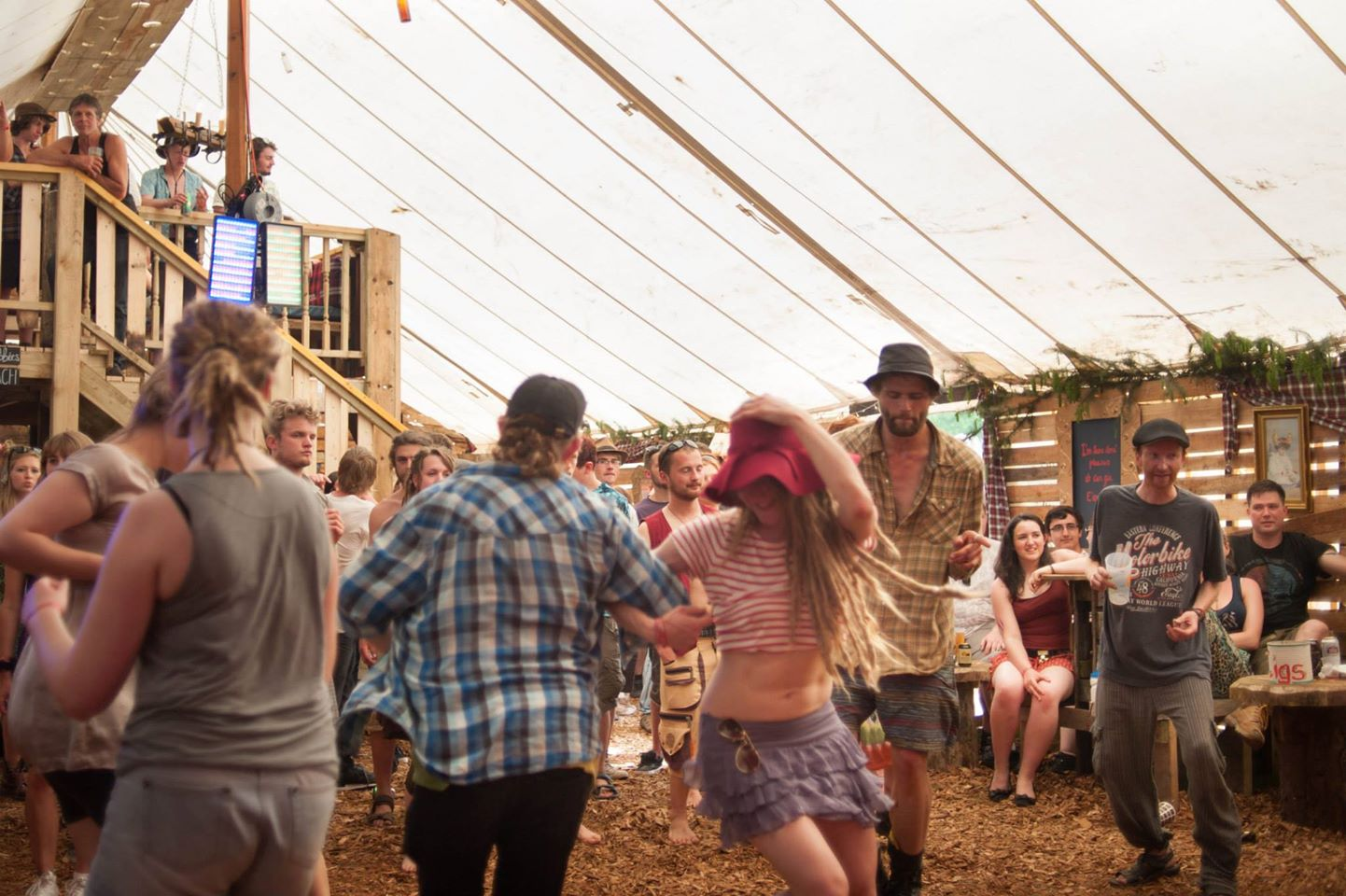
- Named after local bard and icon Rabbie Burns, Rabbies Tavern is one of Eden Festival's many bars
- Genre: Alternative, World, Electro Rave, Trance, Folk, Reggae, Psychedelic, Celtic, Chillout, Disco, Comedy, Spoken Word, Theatre, Cabaret
- Dates: Mid-June
- Locations: Raehills Meadows, Moffat, Dumfries and Galloway, Scotland
- Years active: 2009 - present
- Website: http://www.edenfestival.co.uk/

Eden Festival is a Scottish music festival held in Raehills Meadows near Moffat, Dumfries and Galloway. In 2023 it had a capacity of 4999, and has recently been shortlisted for the Best Family Festival award in the UK Festival Awards in 2023.

== History ==
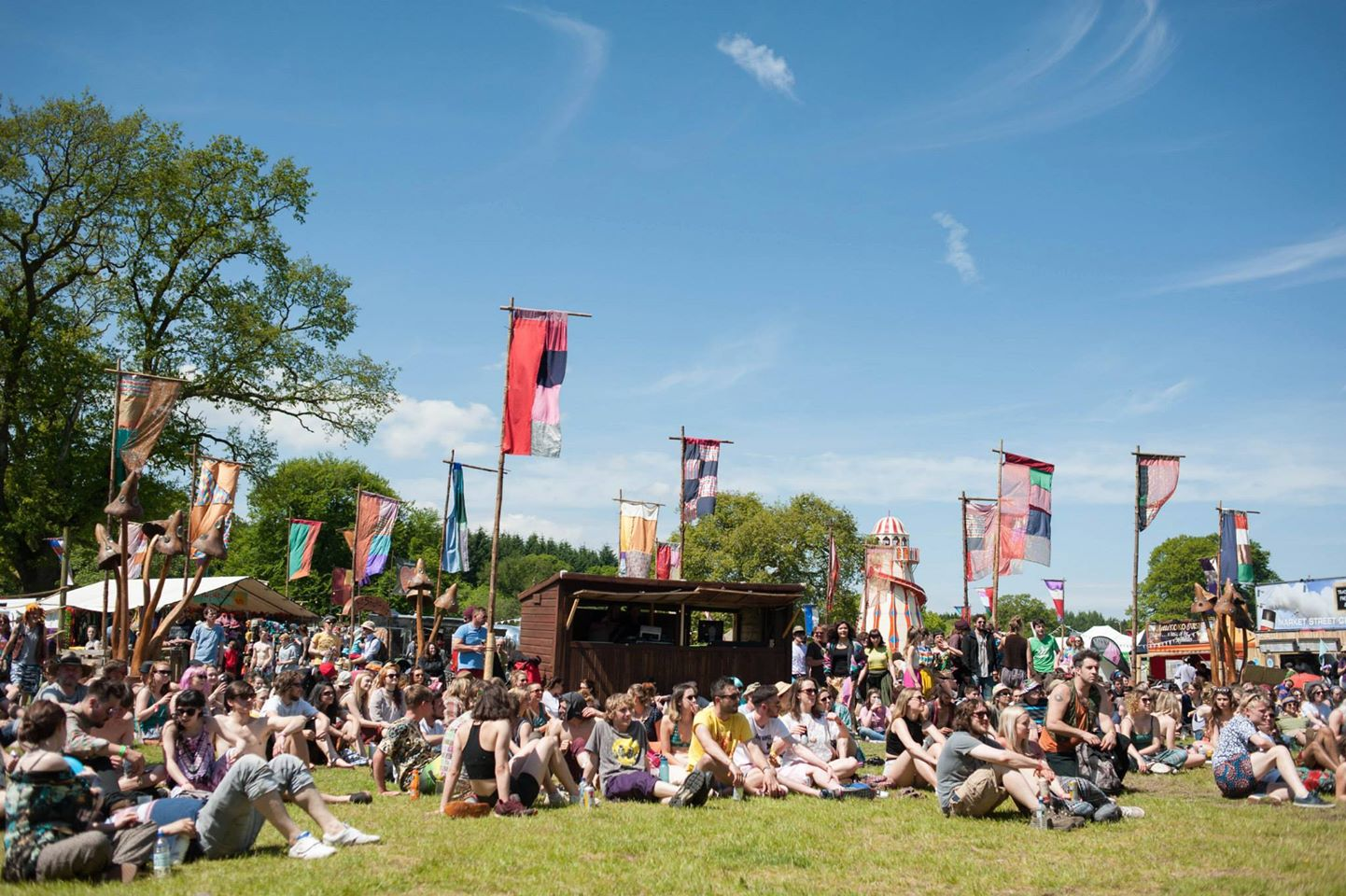
Main stage

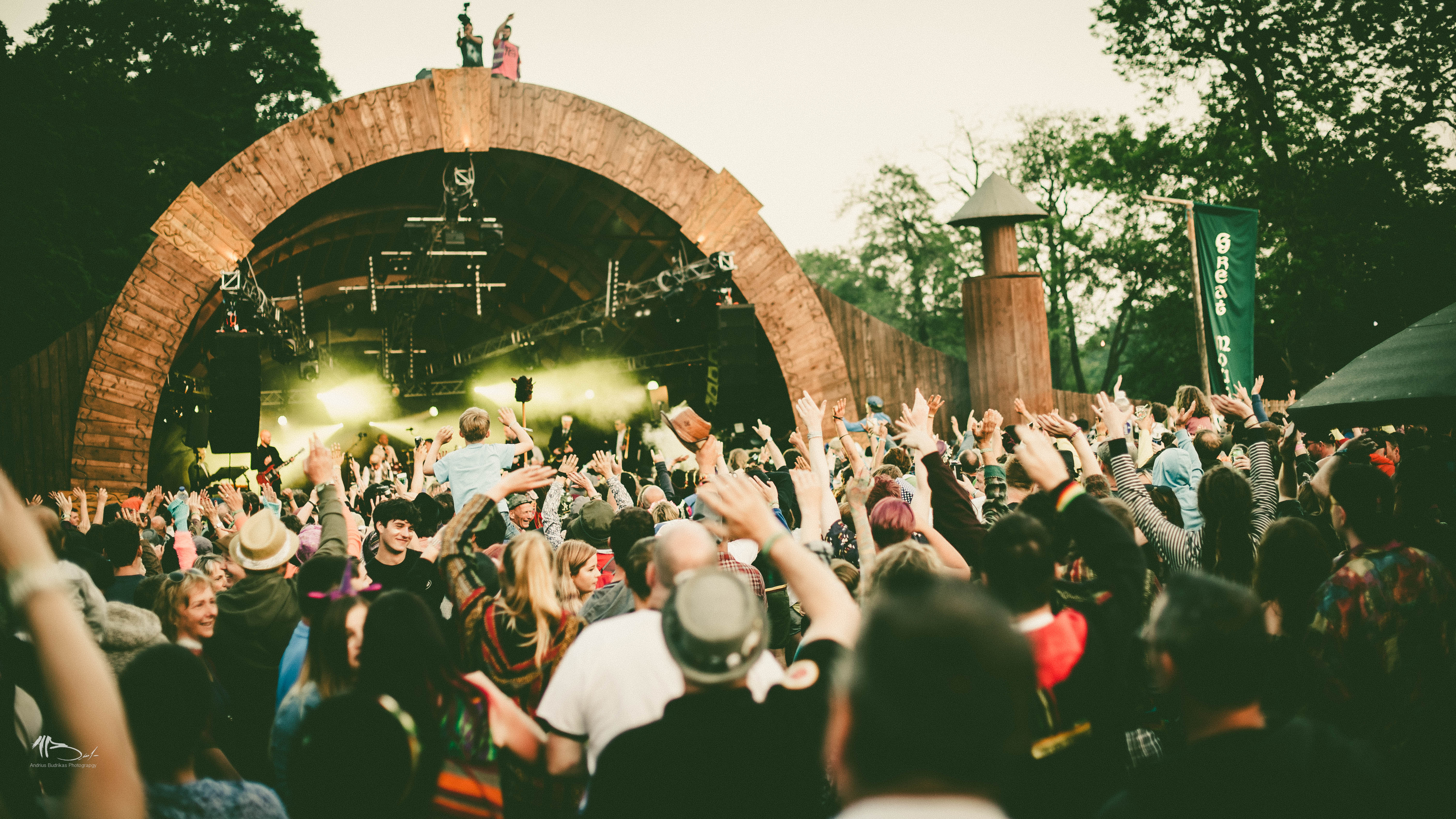
Great Mountain Stage

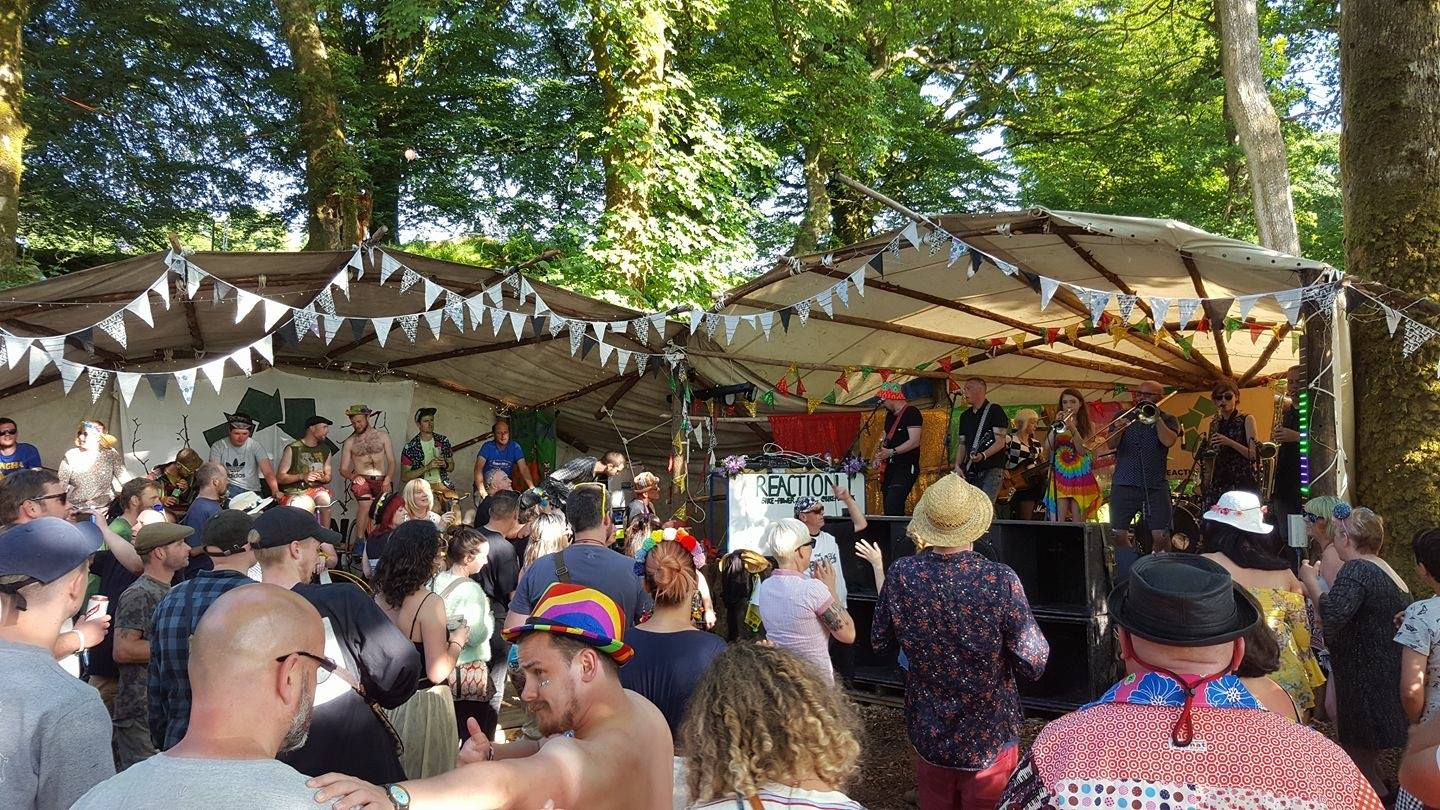
Cycle Powered Reggae Stage in the Boardwalk Arena

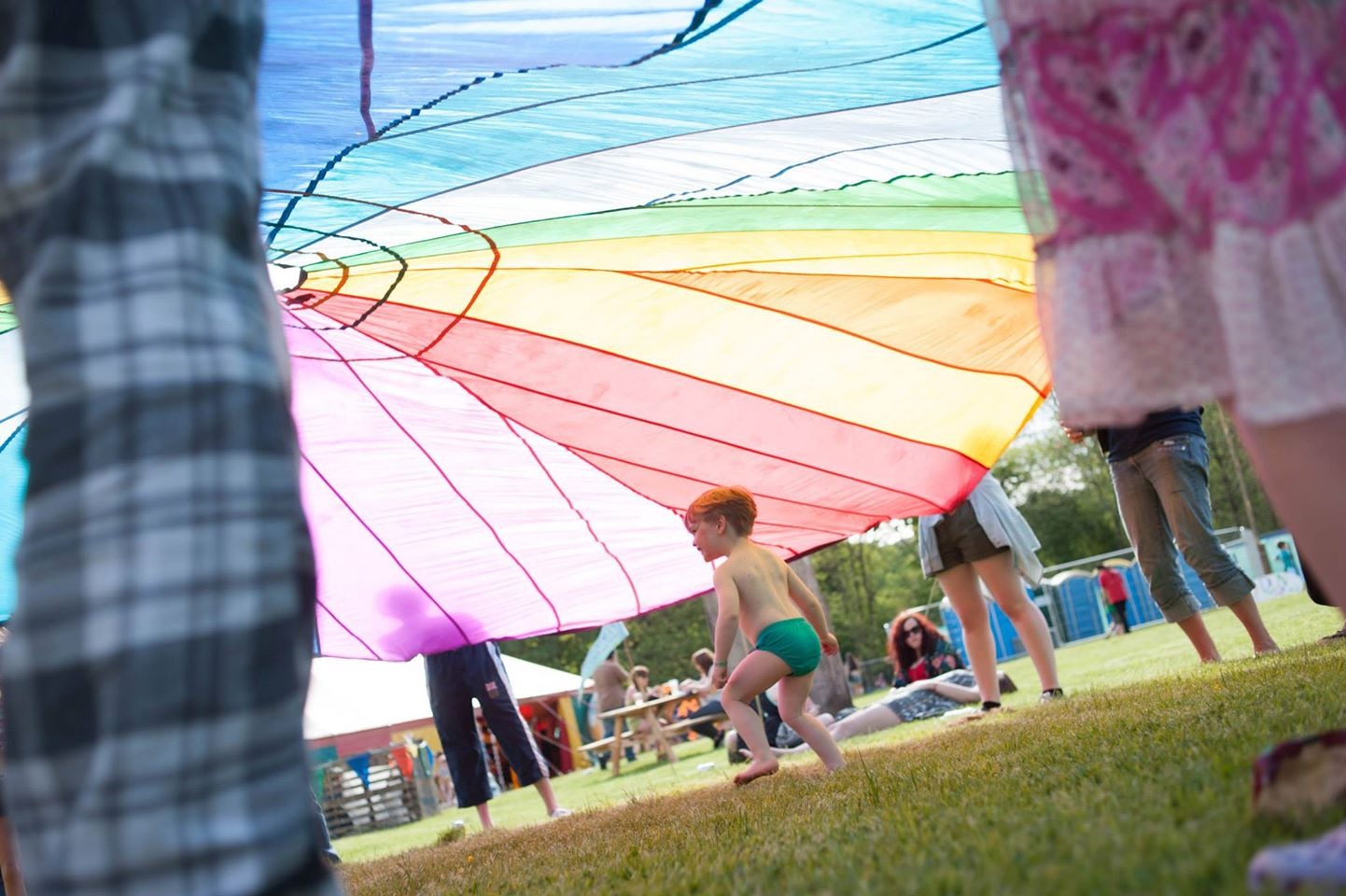
The festival has a large kids area and has a large family attendance

Eden began as an area of the Wickerman Festival in 2002, before becoming its own festival in 2009. This first festival was held in the Forest of Ae between 4 and 6 September, and was headlined by The Levellers.

In 2010, the event moved to Raehills Meadows, near Moffat in Dumfries and Galloway, again in September. In 2011, the date was moved to June.

In 2014, Eden Festival was named one of the Lonely Planets' top 10 European festivals and the Guardians' top 20 family festivals. Along with being shortlisted for Best Family Festival, Best Small Festival and Best Grassroots Festival at the UK Festival Awards in 2014 and 2015.

In 2015, Eden Festival was named as one of 12 events recommended to be funded by Dumfries and Galloway Council's Major Events Strategic Fund. Other events on the list included the Knockengorroch festival and the Lockerbie Jazz Festival.

In 2017, the festival received £12,500 in funding from Event Scotland to support the creation of the "Great Mountain Stage", part of a new area of the festival called "The Hanging Gardens Of Babylon." Dumfries and Galloway council awarded the festival an £18,000 grant, and the capacity of the festival was also increased to 9000.

In 2018, the festival held its 10th anniversary with an audience estimated to be around 9000. The festival also announced that they would ban single use plastics for the 2019 event which had already been reduced to bottled juices on some trade stalls (though water is available freely around site).

The 2019 Festival was held between 6 and 9 June. After two years out due to covid the festival is due to return on 9–12 June 2022 with headliners Supergrass, Basement Jaxx and Coolio topping the bill.

== Stages ==
Eden Festival has 9 stages/areas;

- The Great Mountain Stage
- Rabbie's Tavern
- Ghilli Dhu Dance Emporium
- The Vishnu Lounge
- The Lost Disco
- The Boardwalk Stage
- The Melodrome Theatre
- The Garden
- The Woodland Arena

The festival also features a large children's area, family camping, woodland sauna, workshop arena, cabaret, drive-in cinema, several pop up craft ale or Prosecco bars, healing area, backstage barge live lounge, glamping by the moat, a maze, a henge and all built around one central collaborative garden.

== Line up ==
2022

Supergrass, Basement Jaxx (DJ), Coolio, Hollie Cook, Roni Size, Craig Charles Funk and Soul Club, Mungo's Hi Fi, The Mouse Outfit, Onipa, Pongo, La La, Pictish Trail, Niteworks, Hallouminati, Testpress, Colonel Mustard & The Dijon 5, Bombskare, The Hoojamamas, The Langan Band, Awkward Family Portraits, Mista Trick, Tom Mcguire and the Brassholes, Cara Rose, Banjo Lounge 4, Quick, Russel Stewar, Ceol An Aire.

2019

Chinese Man, This Is The Kit, DJ Zinc, Irvine Welsh (DJ), S.P.Y., Bondax, My Baby, John Cooper Clarke, Macka B and the Roots Ragga Band, Kitty Daisy & Lewis, Optimo, Lau, Flamingods, Smooth & Turrell, Sketch, Trojan Soundsystem, Mouse Outfit, Barely Legal, Kenny Ken, Leofah & Chunky, Aries, Antie Flo, Tankus the Henge, The Dhol Foundation, Bombskare, Adam Holmes & The Embers, Schlachthofbronx, Serial Killaz, Blue Rose Code, Mr Motivator.

2018

Groove Armada, Submotion Orchestra, Super Hans, Plump DJs, Shooglenifty, Peatbog Faeries, Bez's Acid House, Eat Static, Mungo's Hifi, Stanton Warriors, Zion Train, Blazin Fiddles, JFB, Askillz, Electric Swing Circus, Elephant Sessions, Cut Capers, Mr B the Gentleman Rhymer, Bombskare, K.O.G and the Zongo Brigade, Ghetto Funk All Stars, Manudigital, The Turbans, The Langan Band, Nightwave, Son of Dave, Professor Elemental, Talisk, Nightworks, Asbo Disco, Jus Now, Ross Ainslie and Ali Hutton, Colonel Mustard & the Dijon 5, Holy Molly and the Crackers, Eva Lazarus Sound System, The Busy Twist, WBBL, Chimpo, Tantz, Gardna, The Dangleberries, Smerins Anti Social Club, Afriquoi, Withered Hand, The Carny Villains, Monster Ceilidh Band, Esperanza, Samson Sounds, King Lagoons Flying Swordfish Dance Band plus special guest Mr Motivator.

2017

Cat Power, Gogol Bordello, Boney M, Agnes Obel, 2 Many DJ's, Alabama 3, Jungle, Alice Russell, So Solid Crew, Mala, Admiral Fallow, Jazzanova, Horse Meat Disco, Dub Phizix and Strategy, Kissmet, Mungo's Hifi ft Solo Banton, Featurecast, Harri & Domenic, Ghetto Funk Label Party, Auntie Flo, Eva Lazarus Soundsystem, Gavin Marwicks Journeyman Project, The Chair, Talisk, The Langan Band, Elephant Sessions, Asbo Disco, Gardna, Selecta Jman, Born on Road, WBBL, Gypsy Disco, Colonel Mustard & the Dijon 5, Have Mercy Las Vegas, Psymmetrix, The Hempolics, Sketch, Fleck Heron Valley, Emma Gillespie, Samson Sounds, Maxi roots in Cumbia, Gnoss, Rory McCloud plus special guest Mr Motivator.

2016

Morcheeba, King Charles, Andreya Triana, Congo Natty, Gentlemans Dub Club, Craig Charles Funk & Soul Club, Toddla T, OM Unit, Swindle, Hollie Cook, DJ Vadim, DJQ, Ed Solo & Deekline, Mungo's Hifi, The Langan Band, Stylo G, Channel One Sound System, Harleigh Blu, Ghetto Funk Label Party, Asbo Disco, Far Too Loud, Earl Gateshead, Hackney Colliery Band, Cosmo Sheldrake, London Afrobeat Collective, Werkha, Withered Hand, Keysound ft Dusk & Blackdown Sully & Koast MC, Yaaba Funk, Born on Road ft Aries, Gardna & Cheshire Cat, Kelvin 373 plus special guest Mr Motivator.

2015

Cat Empire, Grandmaster Flash, Ms Dynamite, Submotion Orchestra, Gerry Cinnamon, Portico, The Skints, Alpines, JFB, Ghetto Funk Label Party, Mungo's Hifi, Dub Mafia, Kahn & Neek, Nubiyan Twist, Gypsy Disco, Asbo Disco, Too Many T's, Son of Dave, Afriquoi, Undercover Hippy, Age of Glass, Cut Capers, Badger Badger, Tantz, King Lagoons Flying Swordfish Dance Band, Father Funk, The Inexplicables, Monster Ceilidh Band, Mickey 9's, The Busy Twist, Colonel Mustard & the Dijon 5, Sam Binga, Liquid Ross, Monk3y Logic and special guest Mr Motivator.

2014

De La Soul, Artful Dodger, Bez's Acid House, Howard Marks (DJ Set & stand up), Heatwave, The Nextmen, Ghetto Funk label party including JFB, Jus Now, Electric Swing Circus, Prince Fatty ft. The Horseman, Gypsy Disco, Will And The People, Mungos Hi Fi, Asbo Disco, Dreadsquad, Beans on Toast, Hector Bizerk, Federation of The Disco Pimp, Jinx In Dub, Monk3y Logic, The Black Diamond Express, Duncan Disorderly & The Scallywags, Solko, Biggles Wartime Band, Mr. Motivator.

2013

Caravan Palace (DJ Set), Ed Solo & Deekline, The Asbo Disco, Beans On Toast, Dub Mafia, Smoove & Turrell, Mr B The Gentleman Rhymer, Electric Swing Circus, Mungo's Hi Fi ft Charlie P, Resonators, The Drop, Woodenbox, King Lagoons Flying Swordfish Dance Band, and Anderson McGinty Webster Ward and Fisher, Sam and the Womp, Craig Charles, Shy FX & Stamina, The Carny Villains, The Correspondents, Electric Swing Circus, Slamboree, Mr. Motivator.

2012

The Cuban Brothers, Badly Drawn Boy, Dub Pistols Soundsystem, The Peatbog Faeries, Skerryvore, A Skillz, Slamboree, Sicknote, Mungos Hi Fi, King Porter Stomp, Bombskare, The Undercover Hippy, The John Langan Band, Beans On Toast, Mr Motivator

2011

Gomez, Parov Stelar, Emma's Imagination, Herbaliser DJs, Zion Train, Baghdaddies, Orkestra Del Sol, Shotnez, 3 Daft Monkeys, Smerins Anti-Social Club, Louis Barabas & The Bedlam Six, Bombskare, Yes Sir Boss, East Park Reggae Collective ft Lotek, Undercover Hippy, Horndog Brass Band, The Balkan Bandits, Mojo And The Beatniks, Thrill Collins, The Drop, Drunken Balordi, Esperanza, The Indian Postal Service, Your Dad, Celtic Rasta, Sinister Flynn, More From Jim, Ska Ya Man, Brynovsky, Horndog Brass Band, The Mike Kearney Ka-Tet, The Dull Fudds, Pikey Beatz, The Dark Jokes, The Inflictors, Jimmy Lightfoot and the Disciples, The Sundancer, Portnawak and the Woo

2010

Gil Scott-Heron, Zero 7 (DJ Set), Pama International, Zion Train, Belleruche, 3 Daft Monkeys, Louis Barabbas & The Bedlam Six, Yes Sir Boss, The Balkan Bandits, Biggles Wartime Band, John Langan, Drunken Balordi, Roots Manuva, Bombskare, Big Hand, Wobbly Squadron, Maybe Myrtle Tyrtle, Juno Reactor, Morph, The Meatmen, Spartan Tartan

2009

The Levellers, System 7, Eatstatic, Banco De Gaia, Nucleus Roots, Bombskare, Shooglenifty, Orkestra Del Sol, The Baghdaddies, The Apples, Zuba Bassa Beat, Samba Ya Bamba, Black Cat, Zub Zub, The Destroyers.
