= Knockengorroch =

World music festival in Scotland

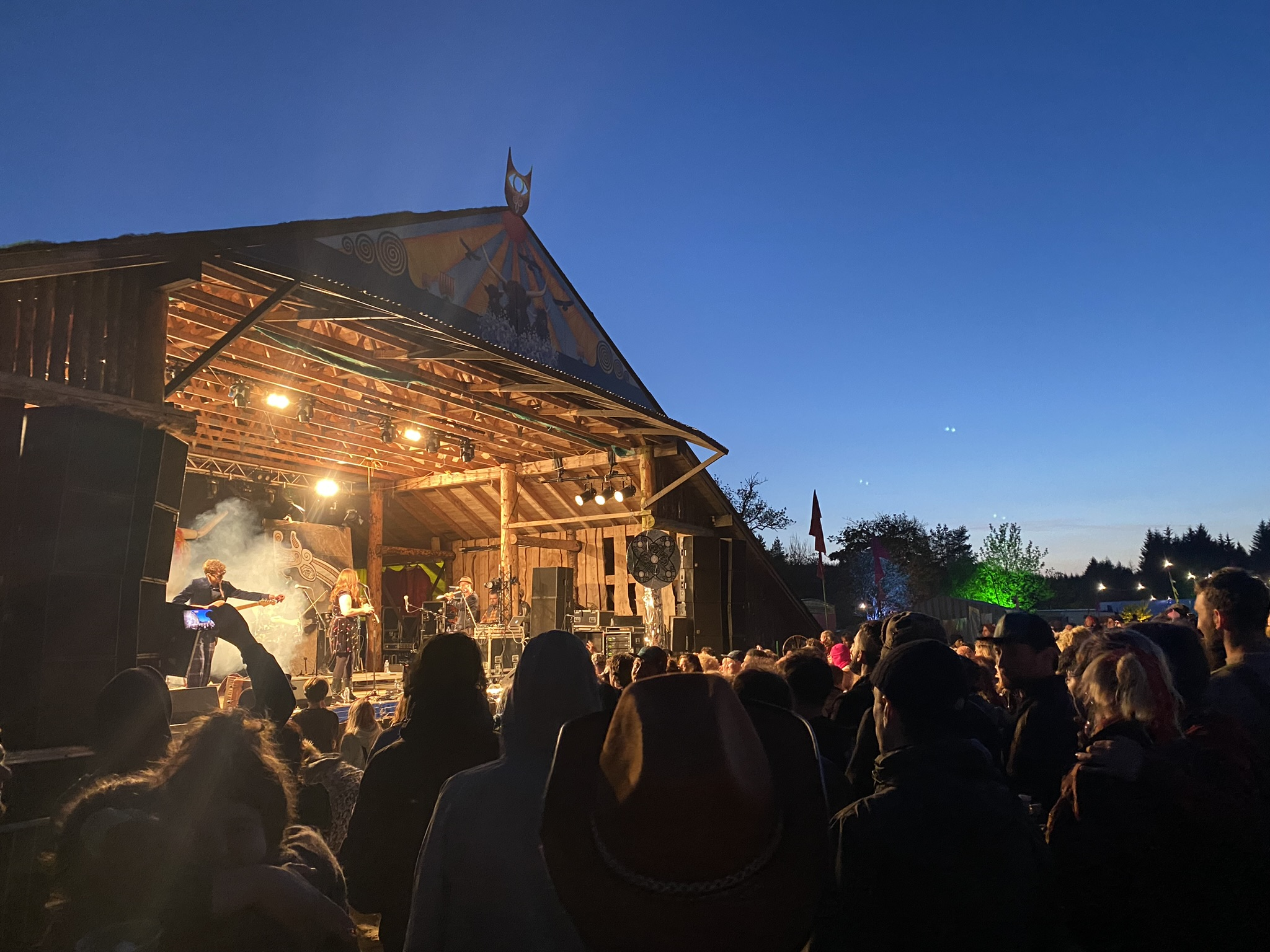
- Knockengorroch main stage in 2023
- Genre: Celtic, roots, world
- Dates: End of May (3 days)
- Locations: Carsphairn Hills, Kirkcudbrightshire, Scotland
- Years active: 1998–present
- Founders: Simon and Liz Holmes
- Website: www.knockengorroch.org.uk

Knockengorroch is a world music festival held annually among the Carsphairn Hills in Kirkcudbrightshire, Scotland. From its founding in 1998 until 2010 there were two annual festivals: the World Ceilidh Festival, usually held around the end of May; and the Hairth, held in mid-September. Since 2011, only the former has been held, with licensing for around 3,000 attendees.

== The early years ==
In mid-summer 1997, a 'rainbow gathering' was held on the Knockengorroch Farm in Galloway with the agreement of Simon and Liz Holmes. The festival is now an established event in the region. It has grown since its beginnings while still remaining an intimate and hospitable experience, welcoming people from all over Scotland, the UK and beyond for a relaxed, inspiring and riotous four days.

The festival has grown from an audience of 300 locals to 2700, including international visitors. The origin of the festival's name is unclear, but in Gaelic ‘knock’ (Cnoc) means a hill and ‘gorroch’ has a variety of meanings. The featured artists originate from Celtic, world and roots music genre and the festival has been held in various other locations as the Forest of Ae near Dumfries, and Talnotry near Newton Stewart.

== Knockengorroch today ==
The festival now takes place in the Dumfries and Galloway hills, in a natural greenfield amphitheatre. The festival features outdoor and covered stages, a dance marquee, a recreated Iron Age Longhouse venue, a Ceilidh, a children’s marquee and procession, puppet shows, cabaret, fire shows, open mic, workshops, camping, real ale, food and shopping stalls. There is an emphasis on as much environmentally sound practice as possible, with a rigorous recycling policy, use of biodegradable products and alternative sources of power wherever possible, and both green and heritage workshops are available to participate in during the day.

The object of Knockengorroch artistic direction is to establish progressive linkage between the celebration of the natural amphitheatre of its venues and the now far-flung Celtic diaspora, once rooted in such homely places. It is Knockengorroch’s remit not only to celebrate ethnic diversity and fusion, but to make the music home in its natural home.

On the still wider contemporary seas of world-music the aim is primarily to promote multi-cultural forms and musical genres, highlighting the connection between roots music and the land that gave birth to that music and its people. Music from all continents is therefore booked alongside the best in Scottish, and European, talent to showcase Celtic and World music in both traditional and contemporary fields.

In 2015, Knockengorroch was one of 12 events to be recommended to be funded by Dumfries and Galloway Council's Major Events Strategic Fund. Others on the list included the Eden Festival and the Lockerbie Jazz Festival.

== Past line-ups ==
2015 line up

- Young Fathers
- Aziza Brahim
- B & the Roots Ragga Band
- Peatbog Faeries
- Shooglenifty
- Scratch Perverts
- Ferocious Dog
- Mungo's Hi Fi Soundsystem ft Solo Banton
- Awry
- Gnawa Blues All Stars
- Stanley Odd
- Age of Glass
- John Langan Band
- DJ Format
- Bella Hardy and Big Band
- The Girobabies
- Rob Heron & the Teapad Orchestra
- Samedia Shebeen
- The Amphetameanies
- Big Swing Soundsystem
- London Afrobeat Collective
- Blackbeard’s Tea Party
- Bunty Looping
- Jenova Collective
- Samson Sounds
- No Go Stop
- Colonel Mustard & The Dijon 5
- Fitty Gomash
- The Navigantes
- After Hours Quintet
- Ed Cox
- Frogpocket
- Jemima Thewes
- Ewan McLennan
- Kate in the Kettle
- Jeremy Mage & the Magi
- DJ Dolphin Boy
- The Badwills
- Skayaman
- Sticks and Stones
- The Razorbills
- The Chicken Brothers (TCB)
- Griogair
- Tam Tam 2000
- PyroCeltica
- Ross Ainslie
- Stivs
- Chapel Perilous Art System
- Mayawaska
- Breezak
- PJ Coyle
- Xymox
- DJ Brainstorm
- Easy Skankin Crew
- Andy Mac
- Ben-Jamin
- Papa Shanti
- Neil Templar
- Key Lo
- Kala Ushka
- DJ Nem
- Bit Monkey
- Tom Tom the Piper’s Son
- Mischief La-Bas
- Voice Box Theatre
- Teatro Magnetico
- BassTonik
- Swing and Shout
- Cosmic
- BBL vs Triple Drop
- Wobbley Social
- ETC
- The Too Much Fun Club presents Sketch the Rhyme

2009 (September) Knockengorroch Doonhaime Hairth Line-up

- Peatbog Faeries
- 3 Daft Monkeys
- Tiger Style
- Tofu Love Frogs
- Latin Dub Sound System
- Glasgow Soundhaus
- Mungo’s Hi Fi
- Bombskare
- Sambayabamba
- Warblefly
- Ed Cox
- DJ Hobbes [Trouble]
- Black Diamond Express
- Frogpocket
- Punch & The Apostles
- Missing Cat
- Haight Ashbury
- Banana Sessions
- Kuch Ke
- Ruby & the Emeralds
- Paddy & the Waggoneers
- Mandalyn May

2009 World Ceilidh Line-up

- The Orb
- Roni Size with MC Jakes
- Orkestra Del Sol
- Errol Lintons Blues Vibe
- Terrafolk
- Mungo's Hi-Fi
- Skerryvore
- Michael Marra

2007 Festival Line-up

- Transglobal Underground
- Natacha Atlas
- Kíla
- Shooglenifty
- Go Lem System
- Mr Scruff
- Zion Train
- Fantazia
- Tannahill Weavers
- The Mordekkers
- Voces del Sur
- Mambo Jambo
- Kampec Dolores
- Albaroot
- Talking Drum
- The Belle Star Band
- Swing Guitars
- Jacob's Pillow
- Bombskare
- Cello Man
- Sun Honey
- Big Hand

2006 festival Line-up

- Bellowhead
- Eliza Carthy & the Ratcatchers
- Huun Huur Tu
- Old Blind Dogs
- Kangaroo Moon
- 3 Daft Monkeys
- The Baghdaddies
- Big Hand
- Paddyrastas
- Pendulums
- Jacob's Pillow

2005 festival Line-up

- 3 Daft Monkeys
- Babylon Arab Band
- Bebe Ouali
- Desmond Dekker & the Aces
- Elephant Talk 2
- Errol Linton's Blues Vibe
- John McSherry
- Le Cod Afrique
- Matt Seattle with the Eildon Strings
- Michael McGoldrick Band
- Mystery Juice
- Planet Woman
- Sheelanagig
- Tarantism
- The Assassenachs
- The Ruffness
- Virginia MacNaughton
- Wuyan Mei & Co

== Primary Ticket Outlets ==
Skiddle
