= Enactone =

2016 experimental film directed by Sky Deep

- Original film poster
- Directed by: Sky Deep
- Written by: Sky Deep
- Produced by: Sky Deep
- Starring: Sky Deep
- Music by: Sky Deep
- Release date: October 22, 2016 (Germany)
- Running time: 52 minutes
- Country: Germany
- Language: English

Enactone is a 2016 independent experimental feature film written and directed by American multimedia artist and DJ Sky Deep (Sky Dietrich). Taglined "A Queer Vampire Story," the film has been recognized as a significant work within the "female gaze" and feminist film movements. Major national and industry publications, including The Herald, Metro, and Beatportal, have cited the film for its intersectional approach to the horror and erotic genres.

== Synopsis ==
The narrative centers on a Black vampire woman living in modern-day Berlin. The character is inspired by a historical figure from the early 20th-century Southern United States. While the film is an "art porn" reimagining rather than a documentary, it opens with an authentic archival photograph of the woman who served as the protagonist's inspiration. The story explores themes of survival, queer identity, and the weight of ancestral history.

== Production and Music ==
Produced independently in Berlin, Enactone features Sky Deep as the primary creative lead, overseeing the writing, direction, and score. The soundtrack was a community-based collaboration, featuring musical contributions from Sky Deep and other local Berlin artists. The film's musical themes were further highlighted in the music video for the single "Hunter," which premiered on Afropunk and featured imagery from the movie. Local Berlin press, including Siegessäule, documented the film's production and its roots in the city's queer underground scene.

== Release and Awards ==
Enactone was awarded "Best Feature" at the 2016 Berlin Porn Film Festival. International reception was further bolstered by coverage from French cultural outlet Barbieturix, which cited the film's success as a milestone for racial and gender representation in independent erotic cinema.

The film has screened at several international LGBTQ+ festivals:

- BFI Flare: London LGBTIQ+ Film Festival (2017)
- Queer Lisboa International Queer Film Festival (2017)
- GLITCH Film Festival (2017), hosted at the Centre for Contemporary Arts, Glasgow.
- SQIFF, the Scottish Queer International Film Festival (2017)
- Toronto International Porn Film Festival (2017)
