= Celtic Music Radio =

- Glasgow; Scotland
- Broadcast area: Greater Glasgow
- Frequency: 95.0 MHz

Programming
- Format: Traditional, Contemporary singer-songwriters, Celtic, folk and Roots music.

Ownership
- Owner: Social business not-for-profit; Company Limited by Guarantee

History
- First air date: 16 January 2008
- Former frequencies: 1530 kHz

Technical information
- ERP: 50 watts vertical / 50 watts Horizontal polarization
- Transmitter coordinates: 55.8612°N 4.2435°W

Links
- Webcast: player.broadcast.radio/celtic
- Website: www.celticmusicradio.net

Celtic Music Radio is a Community Radio station in Scotland, broadcasting to the Greater Glasgow on 95.0 FM, Edinburgh on DAB+ and also worldwide via the internet. Celtic Music Radio is a Scottish Charity, registration number SC041172.

The station broadcasts continuously, with live programming during most daytime and evening periods.

== Musical styles and genres ==
The main focus of the station is traditional and contemporary Celtic-influenced music, mainly from Scotland and Ireland, although the playlists regularly include many other genres, including folk, world music, Americana and roots music.

== Music and cultural festivals ==
As a local community broadcaster with strong links to Scottish culture and arts, Celtic Music Radio works closely with many of the music and arts festivals in the Glasgow area, providing live coverage of key events, interviews with performers, and detailed what's on. information.

Celtic Music Radio is closely associated with the annual Celtic Connections music festival which takes place in Glasgow every January, broadcasting 8 hours of live music and interviews from the Glasgow Royal Concert Hall daily.

Celtic Music Radio works closely with the Scottish International Piano Competition broadcasting live coverage of all of the performances.

The station is working with the organisers of other festivals, including the World Pipe Band Championships, Piping Live and the Merchant City Festival and many folk and traditional music events throughout Scotland and Ireland.

== History ==
Following two Ofcom Restricted Service Licence (RSL) short-term trial broadcasts during January 2006 and January 2007 on FM, Celtic Music Radio was awarded a 5-year AM (MW) broadcast Community Radio Licence by OFCOM in July 2007.

The station went live at 15:30 on 1530 kHz AM/MW on 16 January 2008.

Celtic Music Radio applied to Ofcom for an FM broadcasting licence during Round 3 of Community Radio licensing and was successful with an award announced on 17 July 2012 and the 95.0FM frequency was allocated. Within two years a station would have to be launched on the awarded frequency.

The 95FM launch was on 1 July 2014 with 1530 AM/MW ceasing transmission on the same day due to the terms of the FM licence. This welcomed a new audience to the station across Glasgow. The switch to FM improved reception, availability, visibility to tune-in, listener experience and reasons to reach the audience.

== Technical ==
During February 2016, the radio station moved from Glasgow Caledonian University to premises in Admiral Street, which allowed the station to build 3 new studios, a performance space, boardroom, production facilities and Green Room for performing artists. During Covid times the station was broadcasting 100% from presenters homes. The decision was made in 2021 to close their Admiral St studios. A new studio complex is currently being built ready for 2022 in the Braehead shopping centre.

Celtic Music Radio is a member of the Community Media Association and the Scottish Community Broadcasting Network.
