= Banton =

Banton may refer to:

== Places ==
- Banton, Romblon, island municipality in the Philippines
- Banton, North Lanarkshire, a village near the town of Kilsyth, Scotland

== People ==
- Bernie Banton (1946–2007), Australian asbestosis victims campaigner
- Buju Banton (born 1973), Jamaican dancehall deejay and singer
- Burro Banton (born 1956), Jamaican dancehall deejay
- Dalano Banton (born 1999), Canadian basketball player
- Hugh Banton (born 1949), British organist and organ builder
- Michael Banton (1926–2018), British social scientist
- Pato Banton (born 1961), British reggae singer and deejay
- Solo Banton, dub-reggae and dancehall artist
- Starkey Banton (born 1962), British reggae deejay
- Tom Banton (born 1998), English cricketer
