= People on Sunday =

1930 film

- German film poster
- Directed by: Robert Siodmak; Edgar G. Ulmer
- Screenplay by: Billy Wilder; Curt Siodmak (story)
- Produced by: Edgar G. Ulmer; Seymour Nebenzal; Moriz Seeler
- Starring: Erwin Splettstößer; Brigitte Borchert; Wolfgang von Waltershausen; Christl Ehlers; Annie Schreyer
- Cinematography: Eugen Schüfftan
- Music by: Trio Bravo+; Elena Kats-Chernin; Domenique Dumont; Sky Deep (2025)
- Production company: Filmstudio
- Distributed by: Stiftung Deutsche Kinemathek/Berlin (Germany); BFI (DVD)
- Release date: 4 February 1930
- Running time: 73 minutes
- Country: Weimar Republic
- Languages: silent film; German intertitles

People on Sunday (German: Menschen am Sonntag; full title Menschen am Sonntag, ein Film ohne Schauspieler. or People on Sunday: A Film Without Actors) is a 1930 German silent drama film directed by Robert Siodmak and Edgar G. Ulmer from a screenplay by Billy Wilder, based on a reportage by Curt Siodmak, Robert's younger brother. The film follows a group of residents of Berlin on a summer's day during the interwar period. Hailed as a work of genius, it is a pivotal film in the development of German cinema and Hollywood. The film features the talents of Eugen Schüfftan (cinematography), Billy Wilder (screenplay) and Fred Zinnemann (cinematography assistant).

== Production ==
The film is subtitled "a film without actors" and was filmed on Sundays in the summer of 1929. The actors were amateurs whose day jobs were those that they portrayed in the film—the opening titles inform the audience that these actors have all returned to their normal jobs by the time of the film's release in February 1930. They were part of a collective of young Berliners who wrote and produced the film on a shoestring. This lightly scripted, loosely observational work of New Objectivity became a surprise hit.

People on Sunday is notable for its portrayal of daily life in Berlin before Adolf Hitler became Chancellor and as an early work by writer/director Billy Wilder before he moved to the United States to escape from Hitler's Germany.

The film is the directorial debut of the Siodmak Brothers. The film was co-produced by Moriz Seeler, founder of the Filmstudio 1929 production company and Seymour Nebenzal, cousin to the Siodmaks, whose father Heinrich put up the money. The film began a 30-year collaborative friendship between Nebenzal and Wilder.

Siodmak called it "a nice little film" and said Wilder only worked on the movie "a couple of minutes" contributing some ideas.

== Plot ==
People on Sunday (1930)

The film opens at Bahnhof Zoo train station one Saturday morning. Its opening scenes show the bustling traffic of central Berlin. The movie follows five central characters over a weekend. Wolfgang (Wolfgang von Waltershausen), a handsome young man, sees a pretty woman (Christl Ehlers) who seems to be waiting in the street for someone who has not arrived. He takes her for an ice cream, teases her about having been stood up and invites her to a picnic the following day.

Erwin (Erwin Splettstößer) is doing his day job as a taxi driver. While he is fixing the car, his depot receives a phone call from his girlfriend, Annie (Annie Schreyer), who wants to know if they are going to the cinema that evening. Erwin clearly is not keen to go. (One of the motifs of the movie is to play down the importance of the cinema in the lives of these young Berliners.) At the end of the day, Erwin returns home to find Annie moping about in their threadbare apartment. The couple bicker continually as they prepare to go to the cinema. The first fight is regarding the pictures of movie stars in their bathroom. Annie cherishes the pictures of various actors while Erwin enjoys the photos of actresses, and the couple tear up each other's pictures during the squabble. Another argument arises over whether Annie should wear the brim of her hat up or down. (Another theme of the movie is the self-centred machismo represented by Erwin and Wolfgang.) Wolfgang arrives in the middle of this argument and Annie never gets to the cinema; Erwin and Wolfgang drink beer instead and plan to go to the countryside the following day.

The next morning, the two men take a train to Nikolassee, accompanied by Christl and her friend Brigitte (Brigitte Borchert). Annie stays home, sleeping away the day. The four daytrippers walk to Wannsee, along with many other Berliners, to enjoy the beaches and parks. As the four friends have a picnic, swim in the lake and play records on a portable gramophone, Wolfgang flirts with Brigitte, to the annoyance of Christl. He later play-chases Brigitte into the forest, where they find a secluded spot and make love. Afterwards, the four friends take a boat-ride, during which Erwin and Wolfgang flirt with two girls who are in a rowing boat.

As they head back into Berlin, Brigitte suggests to Wolfgang that they meet again the following Sunday. He agrees, but Erwin reminds him afterwards that they had planned instead to attend a football match. Wolfgang's decision remains unresolved. Erwin returns to find Annie still lying in bed, slowly waking up to realize this was the day for their excursion. Erwin angrily shows her what time it is. The final scene returns to shots of the streets of Berlin. The closing series of intertitles announces: "And then on Monday... it is back to work... back to the everyday... back to the daily grind... Four... million... wait for... the next Sunday. The end.".

== Cast ==
The five leading parts were all played by amateur actors.

- Erwin Splettstößer: The taxi driver. He liked acting and appeared later in small roles in two other films also directed by Robert Siodmak, Abschied (1930) and Voruntersuchung (1931). In 1932, he was killed when his own taxi accidentally ran over him.
- Brigitte Borchert: The record shop sales assistant. She was selling records when she was discovered for this film. It was her only role. She married the illustrator Wilhelm M. Busch in 1936, appeared in Weekend am Wannsee, a documentary about People on Sunday, in 2000, and died in Hamburg-Blankenese in August 2011, aged 100.
- Wolfgang von Waltershausen: The wine shop sales assistant. He was born into a wealthy family in Bavaria in 1900 and was a descendant of Georg Friedrich Sartorius. He later had small roles in two other films, Ein Burschenlied aus Heidelberg (1930), co-written by Billy Wilder (1930), as was Der Mann, der seinen Mörder sucht (1931), which was also directed by Robert Siodmak. Under the Third Reich he worked in mining and in post-war West Germany he sold books and audiocassettes. He was married twice and died in 1973.
- Christl Ehlers: The film extra. She was born in 1910, the daughter of artist and architect Alfred Ehlers and harpsichordist Alice Ehlers. She left Germany in 1933, following her Jewish father to Mallorca, then moving to England in 1938, at the height of the Spanish Civil War. She settled with her mother in the United States in 1940. She had a bit part in the Hollywood film Escape (1940). She later married and had four more children, in addition to one child from a previous marriage. She worked with her husband Hampden Wentworth in a family-owned aircraft company, Longen Aircraft, and also had her own vitamin business. Christina and her husband died together when their private plane crashed in Reserve, New Mexico on 2 February 1960.
- Annie Schreyer: The model. There appears to be no information available about her.

Four well-known actors of the Weimar Republic appear in small roles:

- Kurt Gerron as himself
- Valeska Gert as herself
- Heinrich Gretler as himself
- Ernö Verebes as himself

== Reception ==
Contemporary critics regarded the movie as an accurate and laconic portrayal of the Berlin they knew and saw the closing intertitles as an accurate claim that these characters represent ordinary real-life Berliners. In retrospect, these closing words have gained an ironic poignancy in light of the later horrors of Nazi Germany.

In a list of the 100 most important German films, compiled in 1994 by the Association of German Cinémathèques, People on Sunday was placed at #5.

== Revivals ==
In the autumn of 2002, Menschen am Sonntag was presented at one of Berlin's popular Jewish Culture Days. The Berlin-based Eastern European group Trio Bravo+ was commissioned to produce a new silent movie score for the film, which proved highly successful and was subsequently released as a standalone soundtrack CD.

In 2005, the Netherlands Film Institute released an updated DVD of the film, restoring some missing scenes and commissioning a new score from Elena Kats-Chernin. This is the version used by the British Film Institute as the basis for its own DVD entitled People on Sunday, released 25 April 2005.

The Criterion Collection released their edition of Menschen am Sonntag on Blu-ray and DVD in the United States on 28 June 2011, with a score by The Mont Alto Motion Picture Orchestra, and the Elena Kats-Chernin soundtrack as an alternate.

In 2019, Domenique Dumont was invited to compose a soundtrack to the film to be performed at the Les Arcs Film Festival in the French Alps that December. This soundtrack, composed of "13 new pieces Dumont’s shimmering synth-pop" was released by The Leaf Label in November 2020 under the title People On Sunday. The album was featured in All Music's Electronic Albums Of The Year and Bleep's Top 50 Albums of 2020.

Prior to the production of the German television series Babylon Berlin, producer Stephan Arndt and director Achim von Borries screened "Menschen am Sontag" for the entire cast and crew to help them better understand life in Berlin under the Weimar Republic, before the Nazi era.

In November 2025, the Stiftung Deutsche Kinemathek commissioned American musician and filmmaker Sky Deep to perform a new live score for the film. The performance, held in Berlin as part of the "Looking Back to the Present" program, featured a contemporary electronic reinterpretation of the 1930 score.
