= Soom T =

Scottish reggae singer, rapper and activist (born 1979)

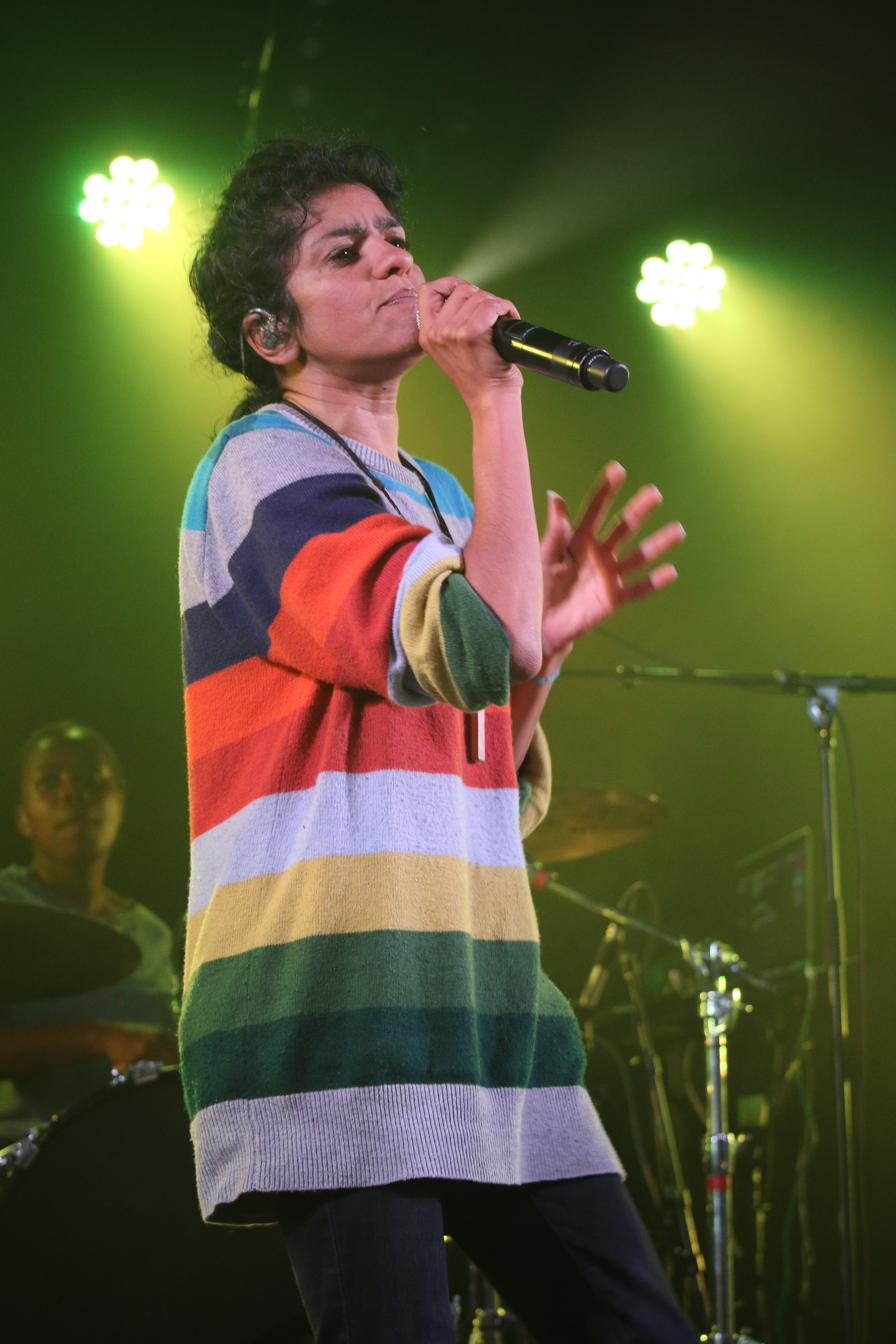
- Soom T at the Paléo Festival in Nyon, Switzerland on 24 July 2016

Background information
- Also known as: Raggamuffin Queen
- Born: Sumati Bhardwaj; 17 June 1979 (age 47); Maryhill, Glasgow, Scotland
- Genres: bhangra, hiphop, reggae, punk
- Works: Good (2022); The Arch (2020); Born Again (2018); Ode To a Karrot (2017); Free As Bird (2015); Bullet Over Babylon (2015); Send Dem Kids To War (2007); The Arch (2020); The Louder the Better (2024)
- Years active: 2005–present
- Labels: Khanti Records; X-Ray Production; Renegade Masters
- Formerly of: Monkeytribe

Sumati Bhardwaj (born 17 June 1979), better known by her stage name Soom T, is a Scottish reggae singer, rapper, record label director and activist. She is nicknamed the "Raggamuffin Queen."

== Biography ==
Soom T was born in Maryhill, Glasgow, Scotland. She is of Indian heritage and is a Christian. She has been nicknamed the "Raggamuffin Queen" by the media and fans.

Soom T's musical career started as a member of the trip hip-hop dub band Monkeytribe, before going solo in 2005. She has collaborated with artists including Alex Dupuis, Asian Dub Foundation, Gaudi, Kiko, King Creosote, Miss Kittin, Mungo's Hi Fi, Naâman, The StoneMonks, Tigerstyle and Xavier Waks. She has also released some bhangra songs.

Soom T has performed at festivals including Paléo Festival in Nyon, Switzerland, Island Vibe Festival in Australia and Kuranda Roots Festival in Mareeba, Queensland, Australia.

In 2013, Soom T wrote the songs for the National Theatre of Scotland musical Glasgow Girls, inspired by a group of seven young Glaswegian women who highlighted the poor treatment of asylum seekers whose rights of appeal had been exhausted.

Soom T is also an activist and has campaigned with the Glaswegian political group Y Network. She performed anti-war song Send Dem Kids To War with supergroup The Burns Unit on the television programme Later... with Jools Holland in 2011.

Soom T established the record label Renegade Masters, through which she self-produced her 2022 album Good. The album cover was designed by French 3D street artist Nikita.
