= Scotch Bonnet Records =

Scotch Bonnet Records is a reggae and dub record label established in Glasgow in 2005. Scrub a Dub is a sub-label of Scotch Bonnet that releases bass music while the main label releases reggae tracks. Scotch Bonnet Records releases many of the Mungo's Hi Fi releases and recordings and has released their latest album Serious Time on 2 June 2014.

== Discography ==
=== Albums ===
Year	Title and details	Label
2009	Sound System Champions	Scotch Bonnet
2011	Forward Ever	Scotch Bonnet
2013	Mungo's Hi-Fi Featuring Kenny Knots - Brand New Bangarang (LP, Album)	Scotch Bonnet
2014	Serious Time	Scotch Bonnet

=== Singles and EPs ===
Year	Title and details	Label
2005	Rasta Meditation / Belly Ska (10")	Scotch Bonnet
2006	Fi Real (7")	Scotch Bonnet
2006	Bun Dem Down (7")	Scotch Bonnet
2006	Yogga Yogga (7")	Scotch Bonnet
2006	Songs Of Zion (7")	Scotch Bonnet
2007	Mary Jane / Herbalist (10")	Scotch Bonnet
2007	Rock Inna Dancehall / Higher Level (10")	Scotch Bonnet
2007	ING / Herbalist (10")	Scotch Bonnet
2007	I Love Jah / Olympic (10")	Scotch Bonnet
2007	Divorce A L'Italienne / A Few Screws Loose (10")	Scotch Bonnet
2008	Mungo's Hi Fi* Ft. Benjammin* / Afrikan Simba / Murrayman - Mexican Bean (12")	Scotch Bonnet
2008	Talk To The People / Grudge And Vanity / How You Bad So / Mexican Bean Riddim (12")	Scotch Bonnet
2008	Mungo's Hi Fi* Ft. Brother Culture - Wickedness (12")	Scotch Bonnet
2009	Mungo's Hi Fi* / Itchy Robot - Fire Pon A Dubplate / Playback (12")	Scrub A Dub
2009	Step It Out / Working Harder (12")	Scotch Bonnet
2009	Mungo's Hi Fi* Ft. Daddy Freddy / Sister Carol / Bongo Chilli - Dread Inna Armagideon / Culture Mi Vote / Nuttin Nah Gwaan (12")	Scotch Bonnet
2009	Mungo's Hi Fi* Ft. Tippa Irie / Omar Perry - Ruff Mi Tuff / Live In Peace (12")	Scotch Bonnet
2009	Under Arrest (12", EP)	Scotch Bonnet
2010	Mungo's Hi Fi* ft. Warrior Queen / Fu Steps* / Conny Ras & Steady Ranks - Bad From Riddim EP 2	Scotch Bonnet
2010	Mungo's Hi Fi* ft. Earl 16* / Black Warrior / YT - Bad From Riddim EP 1 (12", EP)	Scotch Bonnet
2011	Bogle (12")	Scotch Bonnet
2011	Mungo's Hi Fi* Ft. Lady Ann / Sugar Minott / Ranking Levy - Doctor Doctor / Got To Make Tracks / New York Boogie (12")	Scotch Bonnet
2012	Leave The Oil Alone / Skidip It Up Dub (7")	Scotch Bonnet
2012	Mungo's Hi Fi* Ft. Omar Perry / Marina P* - Guidency / Troubles And Worries (7")	Scotch Bonnet
2012	Mungo's Hi Fi* Ft. Earl Sixteen / Wild Life - People / Poze Up (7")	Scotch Bonnet
2012	Mungo's Hi Fi* Ft. Kenny Knots - Don't Let Them (7")	Scotch Bonnet
2012	Mungo's Hi Fi* ft. Eek-A-Mouse / Mungo's Hi Fi* ft. Solo Banton & Ruben Da Silva - Kung Fu Know How (12")	Scrub A Dub
2012	Mungo's Hi Fi* Ft. YT / Daddy Scotty* - World News / Wicked Tings A Gwaan (7")	Scotch Bonnet
2012	Mungo's Hi Fi* Ft. Mr Williamz / Sister Carol - Computer Age / Cuture Mi Vote (7")	Scotch Bonnet
2012	Mungo's Hi Fi* Ft. Daddy Freddy - Dread Inna Armagideon / Dutty Diseases Riddim (7")	Scotch Bonnet
2013	Your Love (7", W/Lbl, Ltd)	Scotch Bonnet
2013	Mungo's Hi Fi* Ft Lady Ann - Sound Get A Beating (7")	Scotch Bonnet
2013	Mungo's Hi-Fi Feat Soom T* - Listening Bug (12")	Scrub A Dub
2013	Mungo's Hi-Fi Feat Soom T* - Bong Bong (12")	Scotch Bonnet
2013	Dubplate Master (12")	Scrub A Dub
2014	The Stinger / Dem Stylee (12", Ltd, W/Lbl)	Scrub A Dub
2019	Rapture 4D & RUDA / Nebula (12", Digital)	Scrub A Dub
