= Drama International Short Film Festival =

Short film festival held in Drama, Greece

- Location: Drama, Greece
- Founded: 1978
- Language: International
- Website: www.dramafilmfestival.gr

Drama International Short Film Festival is Greece's leading short film festival, and the annual meeting place for filmmakers and industry professionals. Based in Drama, Greece, the festival runs a six-day schedule in September and its main venues are Municipal Conservatory and Olympia Cinema.

The festival is the leading Greek and South-Eastern European gateway to the world's most prestigious short-film awards, and nominated filmmakers qualify for the European Film Awards.

The festival presents an annual international competition showing the best new films from Greece and around the world, as well as parallel events including interviews, book presentations, panels and networking for filmmakers and professionals. Drama International Short Film Festival has collaborated with Syn Festival Edinburgh.

== History ==
The Short Film Festival in Drama was first held in 1978, on the initiative of the Drama Film Club. The response of filmmakers, as well as the public, was enthusiastic from the very beginning. A few years later, the festival was adopted by the Municipality of Drama and then, in the mid-eighties, by the Greek State. In 1995, the festival became international.

== Now ==
Over 2,000 films are submitted each year, and the curatorial group selects around 50–60 to screen in competition during the festival. The final selection is approved by the Festival Direction. Short film juries of international film and media professionals select the award-winning films, with awards given at the Awards Ceremony.
