= William Martin Haddow =

Scottish activist (1865–1945)

William Martin Haddow (29 March 1865 – 19 January 1945) was a Scottish socialist activist.

Born in Glasgow, Haddow was educated up to the age of fourteen, then became a pupil teacher, but resigned before completing his apprenticeship to work at the Post Office. There, he was trained in electronics to work at the National Telephone Company, and in 1884 began working as an electrician at a shipyard, followed by time at sea, then at a power station. By the start of the 1890s, he had saved enough money to found his own company, Haddow & Co, which generated and distributed electricity. Concerned that his workers did not have a trade union to join, he founded one in 1890, and became its first secretary.

Haddow became interested in socialism in the late 1880s, and built a friendship with Keir Hardie. He was a founder member of the Scottish Labour Party in 1888, and later of the Independent Labour Party (ILP) in 1893. The ILP was a founder constituent of the Labour Representation Committee, and Haddow was elected as its first Glasgow chairman. In 1900, he stood for Glasgow City Council as an ILP candidate in the Gorbals, but was not elected. In 1903, he was elected to the Glasgow School Board, on which he championed Socialist Sunday Schools, and campaigned for the introduction of school meals and medical checks on children's health.

In 1906, Haddow was one of the founding directors of Forward, a socialist newspaper based in Glasgow. He was involved in a range of artistic ventures, including becoming a governor of the Royal Scottish Academy of Music, founding the Glasgow Music Festival, the Socialist Music Festival, and the Socialist Art Circle. He opposed World War I, but did not participate in the Red Clydeside protests; instead, in 1915, he resigned from the School Board to become Deputy Master of Works, and later served on Glasgow City Council's Educational Committee.

When the ILP split from the Labour Party, Haddow left the ILP, retaining membership of the Labour Party until his death in 1945.
