= Southside Fringe Festival =

Annual fringe festival in Scotland

The Southside Fringe Festival is an annual fringe festival based in Glasgow, Scotland, UK.

== History ==
The development of the Southside Fringe Festival began in 2011. Its aim was to broaden the scope of music, comedy, burlesque, cabaret, art and theatre events happening in Glasgow's southside (predominantly the Shawlands and Queen's Park areas) around the time of the Southside Festival in May. This led to the first full Southside Fringe Festival in May 2013 which was set up by musician Crawford Smith and burlesque star Corinna Currie (also known as 'Sarcassy Sneek' ) to respond to demand for localised music, comedy, burlesque and cabaret events in local venues.

The festival has continued to grow, in 2014 with 140 acts across 37 venues, up on 110 shows in 28 venues in their first year. Further growth in 2015 has seen the Southside of Glasgow host in excess of 170 events in 41 venues. Also in 2014, the festival opened a temporary headquarters on Pollokshaws Road. February 2015 saw the festival move into a permanent home in Govanhill Baths. 2016 saw the festival grow to over 200 events and 50 venues. The Fringe became guests of the Art Village in the Shawlands Shopping Centre, however co-founder Crawford Smith moved on from the project in the proceeding Summer.

== See also ==
- Culture in Glasgow
- List of festivals in Glasgow
- Southside Film Festival
- Edinburgh Festival Fringe
