= Naâman =

French musician (1990–2025)

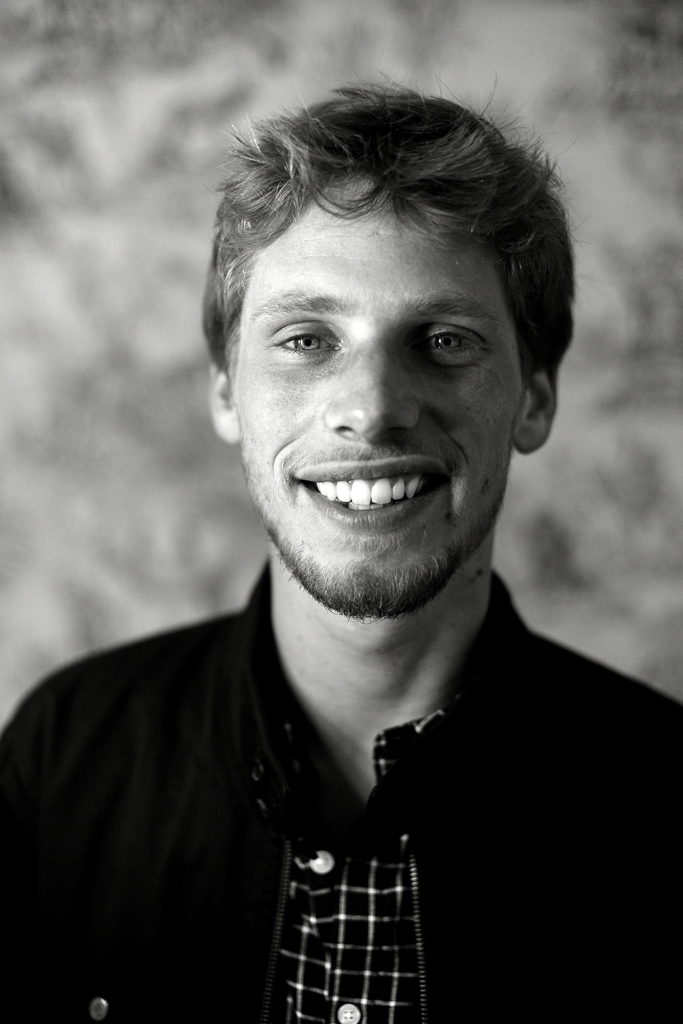
- Naâman in 2016.

Background information
- Birth name: Martin Mussard
- Born: 25 February 1990; Mont-Saint-Aignan, France
- Died: 7 February 2025 (aged 34); Villenave-d'Ornon, France
- Genres: Reggae, ska, blues, folk, hip hop, dancehall
- Occupation(s): Singer, composer
- Years active: 2010–2022
- Website: www.naaman-official.com

Martin Mussard (French pronunciation: [maʁtɛ̃ mysaʁ]; 25 February 1990 – 7 February 2025), better known by his stage name Naâman (pronounced [na(ʔ)aman]), was a French reggae musician, singer, and songwriter, with ska, blues, folk, hip hop, and dancehall influences.

== Biography ==
Born in Dieppe, Normandy, Naâman attended the local Catholic private school. He graduated with a literary baccalauréat and continued studies in communication and graphic arts in Caen and was associated from youth in a local music group Les Young Kha. In 2010, he abandoned his studies to concentrate his time to music, choosing the name Naâman, from the biblical figure Naaman.

Naâman started singing reggae with African and Antilles influences and singing in a Jamaican accent with his band releasing his first independent mixtape Deep Rockers. He also took part in 2012 in Reggae Sun Ska Festival. His mixtape was well received and buzz increased about his artistry on social networks.

In 2012 he travelled to Jamaica to study the Jamaican Rastafari style with Radio VL naming him the reggae revelation of 2013 in addition to the same title during "Victoires du reggae 2013". With his beatmaker Fatbabs he recorded in Studio Harry J, which had recorded some of the music of Bob Marley and the Wailers. On returning to France Naâman released his album Deep Rockers, Back a Yard on 4 June 2013. He promoted the album with a French live tour with additional dates in UK, Russia, and China and a show at the Garance Reggae Festival opening for Jon Holt, the famous reggae singer of the 1970s. His album Deep Rockers, Back a Yard was named "Reggae album, French touch 2014". He also publicly supported legal production of cannabis during the professional exposition Expogrow.

In 2015, Naâman released his new album Rays of Resistance in addition to a world tour that took him in addition to his pan-French tour to the Middle East, India, and Jamaica. With his friends, he organized a charity concert in May 2015 in Paris in aid of earthquake victims in Nepal shortly after a gig he had in Nepal itself. He was active also in the aid of Caritas for helping Migrant Domestic Workers in Lebanon. In July 2015, he also appeared in Les Francofolies de La Rochelle. He also collaborated with artists including Soom T.

=== Death ===
Diagnosed with a brain tumour in 2019, Naâman died from complications of cancer on 7 February 2025, at the age of 34.

== Discography ==
=== Albums ===
Year	Album	Peak positions		Certification
Year	Album	FRA	BEL (Wa)	Certification
2013	Deep Rockers, Back a Yard	154	—	
2015	Rays of Resistance	33	113	
2017	Beyond	34	135	
2022	Temple Road	21	—	

Others

- 2012: Deep Rockers (mixtape)
- 2014: From the Deep to the Rock (CD + DVD)
- 2015: Know Yourself (jointly with Massy and Triple)
