= Fèis Bharraigh =

Gaelic arts and culture event in Scotland

Fèis Bharraigh (Scottish Gaelic pronunciation: [ˌfeːʃˈvarˠaj]) is an annual Gaelic arts and culture event, held on Barra. The first event was held in 1981. Events continue to promote, encourage, foster and develop the practice and study of the Scottish Gaelic language, literature, music, drama and culture on the islands of Barra and Vatersay.

The Fèis movement came about when a group of parents and other individuals on the Isle of Barra became concerned that local traditions were dying out and that island children were not being taught traditional music in the context of formal education. This first Fèis, which means "festival" in Gaelic, laid down the path for many more Fèisean, inspired by the success of the first Fèis, to spring up around Scotland with each one community led and tailored to local needs. By 2007, there were 40 Fèisean held across Scotland.

In 2007, Fèis Bharraigh launched "BarraFest - Live @ the Edge", a weekend festival of traditional and modern Scottish music held on the Tangasdale machair. BarraFest 2008 was held on 25–26 July.

== See also ==
- List of Celtic festivals
