= List of festivals in Glasgow =

Glasgow Festivals include festivals for art, film, comedy, folk music and jazz. Glasgow also hosts an annual queer arts festival in November.

Unlike the Edinburgh Festival (where the main festival and fringe festivals all occur around about the same time in August), Glasgow's festivals are spread evenly across the year, therefore ensuring a continuous annual programme of events.

== Past festivals ==
In the late 19th and early 20th centuries, Glasgow held several Great Exhibitions. They were the International Exhibition of Science, Art and Industry in 1888, the Glasgow International Exhibition in 1901, the Scottish Exhibition of National History, Art and Industry in 1911 and the Empire Exhibition in 1938. The latter attracted 12.6 million visits, easily eclipsing the Festival of Britain (1951) or the Millennium Dome in London (2000). Glasgow also hosted the Industrial exhibitions as part of the Festival of Britain in 1951.

Glasgow's Mayfest started in 1983 from the popular success of the STUC-organised May Day Parades and became a citywide public festival, covering theatre, music, dance, and visual arts. It became the second largest arts festival in Britain until funding ceased in 1997.

In 1988, Glasgow hosted the Glasgow Garden Festival on old docks opposite the SECC, now home to the Glasgow Science Centre at Pacific Quay. 4.3 million people attended over 5 months, making it by far the most popular of the UK's five Garden Festivals held between 1984 and 1992.

In August 1990 Glasgow was designated the European Community's European City of Culture, the first such city in Britain and featured a year-long calendar of special events, inspiring the creation of several festivals which still continue today.

In 2008 Glasgow was declared a UNESCO City of Music, the first in Britain, and joins 9 other cities with the status worldwide.

== Main festivals ==
Glasgow's main festivals are Celtic Connections,(founded 1993), the Jazz Festival (founded 1987), the West End Festival (founded 1996), Merchant City Festival (founded 2002), Southside Festival [founded 2008], Pride Glasgow Scotland's largest LGBT Pride Festival and Glasgay! (a queer arts festival which is one of the biggest gay and lesbian multi-arts festivals in Europe)(founded 1997).

Glasgow also hosts the annual World Pipe Band Championships in August on Glasgow Green, with over 8,000 musicians.

== Calendar of festivals ==
As part of Glasgow's cultural renaissance, Glasgow is host to a variety of festivals throughout the year:-

=== January ===
- Celtic Connections – Three week-long Celtic folk and world music festival, founded 1993. Now one of the world's most influential music festivals.

=== February ===
- Glasgow Film Festival

=== March ===
- Glasgow International Comedy Festival
- Aye Write! – Annual event of authors and writers. (started 2005).
- Glasgow Music Festival – founded 1911 by William Martin Haddow

=== April ===
- Glasgow International Festival of Contemporary Visual Arts (also known as GI)
- Glasgow Open House Art Festival
- Glasgow Art Fair – Scotland's main art fair

=== May ===
- Southside Film Festival
- Southside Fringe – Festival celebrating the Southside of Glasgow featuring music, art, community activities and much more.

=== June ===
- Glasgow Festival of Wine - an annual wine festival held in the City and organised by Tom Cannavan
- West End Festival – Centred on Byres Road, Ashton Lane, the Botanic Gardens, the University of Glasgow and Kelvingrove Park, it is now Glasgow's biggest popular event with over 150,000 attending 500 events in 75 locations and venues. Founded 1996.
- Glasgow Science Festival – two weeks of science-themed events for children, schools and adults in venues throughout the city. Founded in 2007.
- Lord Provost's Procession – annual community parade (discontinued in 2006)
- Glasgow International Jazz Festival (founded 1989).
- Glasgow Mela - held on and off since 1990 Year of Culture in differing locations and months, now in Kelvingrove Park on a Sunday in June during the West End Festival
- North Glasgow International Festival – event centred on asylum seekers, organised by the police (last held in 2005)
- Bard in the Botanics – (annual open-air Shakespeare in the Glasgow Botanic Gardens)
- Govan Fair – Oldest Festival in Glasgow
- Gorbals Fair – held in the Gorbals every June

=== July ===
- Glasgow's River Festival – two-day family event centred on the Clyde near the SECC and Science Centre. Started 2004, not held in 2010.
- Glasgow Cabaret Festival – week-long theatre, variety, burlesque, circus and comedy festival at various venues around Glasgow. Started 2009, not held in 2010, but was held in October 2011.
- Merchant City Festival – 4-day event to celebrate Glasgow's cultural quarter (started 2002).
- Pride Glasgow – Glasgows Lesbian, Gay, Bi-Sexual and Transgender Pride Festival taking place over the Glasgow Fair Weekend

=== August ===
- Piping Live! Festival – celebration of piping in all its forms in the week's run up to the World Pipe Band Championships.
- World Pipe Band Championships – major international event held annually on Glasgow Green since 1968. 8,000 pipers and 120 bands. Organised by RSPBA.
- Govanhill International Festival and Carnival – celebrating the diversity and community of Govanhill in Glasgow's southside.

=== September ===
- Glasgow Doors Open Days Festival – running for one week every September, an opportunity for the public to visit some of Glasgow's most intriguing buildings and get behind the scenes of the city. The programme also includes talks, tours, exhibitions and a dedicated children's programme. Organised by Glasgow Building Preservation Trust. (started 1989). The Scottish Acoustic Festival 5th - 7th in Oran Mor and Dram.

=== October ===
- The Scottish Mental Health Arts and Film Festival – one of the largest international arts and social justice festivals.

=== November ===
- Africa in Motion – African Film Festival held at the Glasgow Film Theatre. It will be running in parallel with the Edinburgh AiM Festival for first time in 2012.
- Glasgay! Festival
- The Glasgow Festival of Burlesque

=== December ===
- Glasgow's Hogmanay
- Glasgow On Ice

== See also ==
- Culture in Glasgow
