= Six Cities Design Festival =

The Six Cities Design Festival is an international design festival that takes place simultaneously in Scotland's six cities: Aberdeen, Dundee, Edinburgh, Glasgow, Inverness, and Stirling. 2007 is the Festival's inaugural year; a main festival period of over 300 public exhibitions and events ran from 17 May — 3 June. Two ongoing Six Cities Design Festival initiatives, Design into Business and Learning, continue to offer conferences, workshops and classes nationwide. The Six Cities Design Festival is delivered by The Lighthouse (Glasgow): Scotland's National Architecture and Design Centre. The 2007 festival was backed by £3 million from The Scottish Government.

== Background ==
The Festival was announced by Scotland's former First Minister Jack McConnell in February 2005, after the 2 December 2005 publication of Creativity in Business, a review commissioned by The Chancellor Gordon Brown. The review argued that businesses in the UK are not utilising the creative industries to their fullest potential, nor do they realise the profitable impact such utilization can have.

In an ongoing project entitled, The Value of Design Fact Finder, the UK Design Council has gathered supporting evidence that businesses that have invested in design over the past three years increase the likelihood of turnover growth.

Aligning with the findings of Creativity in Business and the UK Design Council, the Six Cities Design Festival's ongoing Design into Business and Learning programmes support Scottish designers and educate businesses on how to profitably engage with this sector.

The Festival was officially launched on 31 October 2006 at media event at Dance Base in Edinburgh.

== The Design into Business programme ==
The Six Cities Design Festival's Design into Business programme serves two primary functions: to educate Scottish businesses about utilising design to improve performance, productivity, and international competitiveness; and to provide professional development to the design community.

The elements that make up the Design into Business programme are case studies, practical master classes, access to online resources, and presentations by keynote international business leaders.

== The Learning programme ==
The Six Cities Design Festival's Learning programme provides professional development for the design community as well as educational programmes about design for the general public.

The elements that make up the Learning programme are practical workshops, master classes, seminars, and public events, including lectures and family programmes.

In 2006, The Learning programme of the Six Cities Design Festival joined Highlands & Islands Enterprise as partners of the National Endowment for Science, Technology and the Arts (NESTA) led project, Starter for 6. The three-year project (2007—2009) will provide business support, mentoring and the opportunity to apply for a start-up grant of up to £10,000 to new Scottish entrepreneurs working in the science, technology or creative industries.

== Public Programmes ==
The Six Cities Design Festival's first main period of public programmes occurred during the main festival period, 17 May—3 June 2007. Over 300 free design-focused exhibitions, talks, tours and events took place across all six cities. Designers such as Peter Saville, Wayne Hemingway, Stefan Sagmeister and Zandra Rhodes participated in talks. Exhibitions from organizations such as the Vitra Design Museum and Norsk Form were on view.

The Scottish Show 07 at The Lighthouse (Glasgow), was a key Festival exhibition, featuring 34 top Scottish designers. Following the international success of the original Scottish Show (2004-5), which promoted Scottish designers in Milan, London and Glasgow, Scottish Show 07 aimed to provide an international platform for Scottish talent.
