= Aberdeen and NE Scotland Music Festival =

The Aberdeen and NE Scotland Music festival is a week-long annual traditional music festival in Aberdeen, Scotland, UK. The festival was created 1n 1909 by Professor Stanford Terry, to encourage music making and performance in the north east of Scotland. It was attended that year by well-known composer Sir Edward Elgar.

The motto of the festival, "Not to gain a prize or defeat a rival but to pace one another on the road to excellence" continues to be relevant today.

The festival is entirely run by volunteers and relies on entry fees, legacies and sponsorship to continue to offer performance opportunities to musicians, singers and actors from the area. The festival includes both competitions and concerts.

The festival has taken place at several venues, including Cowdray Hall, Queen’s Cross Church, Aberdeen Music Hall, The Citadel, St. Mark’s Church and the Boys' Brigade Hall.

== 2013 ==
About 2400 people attended the 2013 festival.
