= Edinburgh Spanish Film Festival =

- Frequency: Annually
- Country: United Kingdom
- Founded: September 2013
- Website: https://www.edinburghspanishfilmfestival.com/en/

The Edinburgh Spanish Film Festival is a film festival held in Edinburgh in October every year at the Filmhouse, with additional screenings in Stirling, Manchester, Aberdeen, and Glasgow.

== History ==
The festival was first created in September 2013 by Marian A. Aréchaga, a Senior Teaching Fellow at the University of Edinburgh who acts as curator and organiser of the event. Aréchaga claims to have been inspired by the examples set by the French and Italian Film Festivals that were already running in the city, which encouraged her to address the lack of Hispanic representation in the city's film festivals.

With the cooperation of the Spanish Ministry of Culture and the Hispanic Studies department at her University, the Edinburgh Spanish Film Festival was established.

== Objectives ==
The festival aims at promoting the Spanish language and culture, as well as its film industry in the international community.

== Events ==
Every year a diverse selection of films from Latin America and Spain are screened at Filmhouse Edinburgh and other British cities, including Manchester, Stirling, Aberdeen, and Glasgow. The program is designed to include, according to Aréchaga, “something for everyone, from children and young people to the most seasoned cinema buffs”.

The festival opened in September 2014 with In a Foreign Land, a documentary by Icíar Bollaín about Spanish expatriates in Edinburgh that had first been screened at the Saint Sebastian Film Festival. The program includes numerous films, short films, animated features, and documentaries. In 2019 it was extended to include audiovisual letters and in 2020 a series of monologues produced during the pandemic.

Although there is not a specific theme for each edition, the organisation prioritises new directors and the most relevant films of the last years produced in the Spanish community.
