= Merchant City Festival =

Coordinates: 55.857°N 4.244°W

The Merchant City Festival is a major cultural festival taking place in Glasgow's Merchant City area.

Attracting more than 55,000 people, the four-day Festival presents the cream of Scotland's theatre, music, visual arts, comedy, dance, film, fashion and food scene.

The Festival presents opera singers in the courtyards and squares performing alongside cutting-edge live art, street theatre, iconoclastic comedy and music from every genre in the bars and on the street. It also has a quirky short film programme that places films in estate agents, hairdressers and tattoo parlours. Many of the events are free of charge.

The Merchant City Festival has attracted an extensive range of supporters and contributors from festival directors to national organisations such as Scottish Opera, Scottish Ballet and BBC Scottish Symphony Orchestra.

A 'festival of festivals', it has worked with established festivals such as New Moves International, the Glasgow International Comedy Festival, Glasgow International Jazz Festival, Big in Falkirk and Glasgay! An international context is provided by the Directors' Choice programme that provides a remarkable range of street artists selected from festival directors throughout Europe.

The 2008 Merchant City Festival was held in September.

The Merchant City Festival is produced by UZ Events in partnership with Glasgow City Marketing Bureau.

Celtic Music Radio broadcast live from the 2008 festival on 1530 kHz and on the internet, from an Outside Broadcast location in Merchant Square.
