= Big in Falkirk =

Scottish arts festival

Big in Falkirk was a festival of the arts held in Falkirk, Scotland, from 2000 to 2009.

Since its inception in 2000, the award-winning (Scottish Thistle Award Events & Festivals 2005) free weekend event was one of the largest cultural events in Scotland, attracting over 100,000 people. Located in Falkirk’s historical 180-acre (0.73 km^{2}) Callendar Park with Callendar House as the focal point, the entertainment included a wide variety of outdoor theatre, pyrotechnic displays, art, comedy and big name music acts alongside activities for all ages.

Big in Falkirk showcased original outdoor contemporary theatre, while also working closely with artists to nurture creativity. Festivals have included world premieres such as Walk the Plank’s Swan Song which closed Saturday’s proceedings in 2006. UK premieres have included Groupe F (the company responsible for illuminating the Eiffel Tower during the millennium celebrations), Compagnie Jo Bithume, Plasticiens Volants and Teatre Osmego D’nia.

Alongside this, Big in Falkirk presented some of the most popular names in music having welcomed Snow Patrol, The Stranglers, Deacon Blue, Bob Geldof and Midge Ure. The festival also managed to secure acts just before they hit the big time, with McFly, Orson and Sandi Thom celebrating number one singles during or immediately after playing at Big in Falkirk.

Big in Falkirk 2007 was on Saturday 5 and Sunday 6 May and headlined by The Human League and Heaven 17.

Big in Falkirk 2008 took place on Saturday 3 and Sunday 4 May and featured Levellers, 10cc, The Complete Stone Roses (a Stone Roses tribute band), Hungry Ghosts, Peatbog Faeries, Day of Days, Nutkhut's Bollywood Steps and the world premiere of The World Famous' Full Circle, which closed the Festival.

Big in Falkirk 2009, the 10th edition, on Saturday 2 and Sunday 3 May and featured Stereo MCs and Capercaillie. Day of Days returned to become the first band to play in consecutive Big in Falkirk festivals. New and upcoming bands such as The Ray Summers, The Skinflints, Young Fathers as well as The Sears and Braebach showcased their music during the weekend. The Sunday night ended with a spectacular pyrotechnic show to celebrate 2009 as the Homecoming Year and to also dedicate the famous Scottish poet Robert Burns' 250th birthday with a special commendation to Tam O' Shanter – one of Burns' best-known poems – and a piper brigade circling the courtyard of Callendar House. The Festival closed with a picture lit by fire to reveal a love heart around the portrait of Burns as fireworks painted the saltire in the sky.

Big in Falkirk was canceled in 2010.

Big in Falkirk also worked with festivals such as Glasgow's Merchant City Festival and Spain's Valladolid.
