= Montrose Music Festival =

Music festival in Angus, Scotland

- Genre: Multiple
- Dates: Late May - Early June
- Locations: Montrose, Scotland, United Kingdom
- Years active: 2008 - 2018
- Website: http://www.montrosemusicfestival.co.uk/

Montrose Music Festival is an annual event, taking place at the end of May in Montrose, Angus, Scotland. The festival first took place in 2008 and is organised by volunteers on a non-profit basis. It won the "Pride of Angus Award" in 2008.

The festival takes place over a three-day period. It is run by a group of volunteers as a non-profit organization and a registered charity. The aim is to promote free, live music of all styles and genres. The festival promotes local artists at various venues, and hosts musicians from across the UK.

Since the last official event, other musical events have been organised through Facebook groups such as Montrose Live, and Virtual Montrose Music Festival.

== History ==
=== Inauguration ===
The first Montrose Music Festival took place Friday 31 May - Sunday 1 June 2008 and was considered a success, bringing thousands of visitors and an estimated £500,000 boost to the local economy. The main attraction was the opening concert by Average White Band, leveraging Montrose's connection with original AWB saxophonist Malcolm Duncan.

On Saturday and Sunday, the music moved into pubs and hotels with over 60 free-entry gigs over the two days. The event included musical acts of varying genres, performing for thousands of attendees. Among these acts were harmonica player Fraser Speirs, Scottish folk band Malinky, English Singer/songwriter Joni Fuller and Oxford-based alt-rock band Lights Action.

=== 2009 ===
The 2009 festival took place from Thursday to Sunday, 28–31 May. Scottish band Deacon Blue headlined. Tickets sold out within 20 minutes. The band then added a second night of playing on the 28th.

=== 2010 ===
2010 saw the team pull in The Fortunate Sons (Now Big Figure) supported by The Worry Beads. Later in the year the Proclaimers came to town .

=== 2011 ===
In 2011, MoFest hosted Skerryvore with support from Dr. Feelgood.

=== 2012 ===
May - Eddi Reader

=== 2013 ===
Toploader performed in May, followed in November by Eddi Reader.

=== 2014 ===
The headliner was Status Quo, supported by The Holy Ghosts. In November, Amelia Lily, Stooshe & The Loveable Rogues performed.

=== 2015 ===
In its 8th Year, Mofest brought ASH to the Town Hall, supported by The Amorettes, a 3-piece female rock band from Glasgow, and local group If All Else Fails, all from 22 to 24 May.

Additions included The Market Area, supported by Event Scotland for the promotion of local Scottish food and drink. A structure called The MoDome was set up as a chillout zone and for hosting acoustic sets after the main stage had finished.

=== 2016 ===
Jools Holland headlined in May, followed in August by Bryan Adams.
