= Aberdeen Alternative Festival =

Multi-arts festival which took place every October in Scotland

The Aberdeen Alternative Festival was a multi-arts festival which took place every October in Aberdeen, Scotland. The festival featured theatre, dance, comedy, music and visual arts events in various venues across the city. The event began in 1983 and grew to become the second largest festival in Scotland after the Edinburgh Festival Fringe. The idea for it originated with city councillor David Clyne. In 1992 Clyne arranged for the venue to get a permanent home as an old community centre was converted into The Lemon Tree event space.

In the late 1990s the festival began to see decreasing attendance. In 2000 the municipal government ended its subsidy for the festival and soon after the festival ended. The Lemon Tree remains as an active venue for concerts and events.
