= Mungo's Hi Fi =

Sound system based in Glasgow, Scotland

- Origin: Glasgow, Scotland
- Genres: Reggae, dub
- Instrument: Sound System
- Years active: 2000–present
- Label: Scotch Bonnet Records
- Members: Tom Tattersall; Douglas Paine; Craig Macleod; Jerome Joly
- Website: mungoshifi.net

Mungo's Hi Fi is a sound system based in Glasgow, Scotland, which follows the original Jamaican sound system tradition. After working together, Tom Tattersall and Doug Paine founded the group in 2000; writing, recording, producing and performing their own brand of reggae and dub music. They frequently work in collaboration with other artists and producers. They were joined in 2002 by Craig Macleod, and in 2006 by Jerome Joly.

Mungo's Hi Fi have released 10 albums alongside a number of EPs and singles, collaborating with a variety of artists including Mike "Prince Fatty" Pelanconi, Max Romeo, Charlie P and Daddy Freddy.

== Discography ==
=== Albums ===
Year	Title and details	Label
2002	Mungo's Hifi Meets Brother Culture – Mungo's Hifi Meets Brother Culture	Dubhead
2009	Sound System Champions	Scotch Bonnet
2011	Forward Ever	Scotch Bonnet
2013	Mungo's Hi-Fi Featuring Kenny Knots – Brand New Bangarang	Scotch Bonnet
2014	Prince Fatty Vs Mungo's Hi-Fi – Prince Fatty Vs Mungo's Hi-Fi	Mr. Bongo
2014	Serious Time	Scotch Bonnet
2014	Serious Dubs	Scotch Bonnet
2015	Mungo's Hi-Fi Feat. Charlie P – You See Me Star	Scotch Bonnet
2016	Mungo's Hi-Fi Feat. YT – No Wata Down Ting	Scotch Bonnet
2019	Mungo's Hi Fi X Eva Lazarus - More Fyah	Scotch Bonnet
2021	Antidote	Scotch Bonnet
2023	Past and Present	Scotch Bonnet

=== Singles and EPs ===
Year	Title and details	Label
2001	Bush Chemists* / Mungo's Hifi* – Dub Fire Blazing / Wickedness (10")	Dubhead
2002	Love Grocer, The / Mungo's Hi-Fi – No Turning Back / Ing (10")	Dubhead
2005	Rasta Meditation / Belly Ska (10")	Scotch Bonnet
2006	Fi Real (7")	Scotch Bonnet
2006	Bun Dem Down (7")	Scotch Bonnet
2006	Yogga Yogga (7")	Scotch Bonnet
2006	Songs of Zion (7")	Scotch Bonnet
2007	Mary Jane / Herbalist (10")	Scotch Bonnet
2007	Rock Inna Dancehall / Higher Level (10")	Scotch Bonnet
2007	ING / Herbalist (10")	Scotch Bonnet
2007	I Love Jah / Olympic (10")	Scotch Bonnet
2007	Divorce A L'Italienne / A Few Screws Loose (10")	Scotch Bonnet
2008	Mungo's Hi Fi* Ft. Benjammin* / Afrikan Simba / Murrayman – Mexican Bean (12")	Scotch Bonnet
2008	Talk to the People / Grudge And Vanity / How You Bad So / Mexican Bean Riddim (12")	Scotch Bonnet
2008	Mungo's Hi Fi* Ft. Brother Culture – Wickedness (12")	Scotch Bonnet
2009	Mungo's Hi Fi* / Itchy Robot – Fire Pon A Dubplate / Playback (12")	Scrub A Dub
2009	Step It Out / Working Harder (12")	Scotch Bonnet
2009	Mungo's Hi Fi* Ft. Daddy Freddy / Sister Carol / Bongo Chilli – Dread Inna Armagideon / Culture Mi Vote / Nuttin Nah Gwaan (12")	Scotch Bonnet
2009	Mungo's Hi Fi* Ft. Tippa Irie / Omar Perry – Ruff Mi Tuff / Live in Peace (12")	Scotch Bonnet
2009	Under Arrest (12", EP)	Scotch Bonnet
2009	Mungos Hifi* / Phokus & Mr. Boogie (3) – Tweeky / The Infect (12")	Police in Helicopter
2009	Tricky D & Mungo's Hi-Fi – Badman / Wickidness (Remix) (12")	Tricky Tunes
2010	Mungo's Hi Fi* ft. Warrior Queen / Fu Steps* / Conny Ras & Steady Ranks – Bad From Riddim EP 2	Scotch Bonnet
2010	Mungo's Hi Fi* ft. Earl 16* / Black Warrior / YT – Bad From Riddim EP 1 (12", EP)	Scotch Bonnet
2011	Earl 16*, Manasseh & Mungo's HiFi* – Reggae Music (4xFile, FLAC, EP)	Reggae Roast
2011	Bogle (12")	Scotch Bonnet
2011	Mungo's Hi Fi* Ft. Lady Ann / Sugar Minott / Ranking Levy – Doctor Doctor / Got To Make Tracks / New York Boogie (12")	Scotch Bonnet
2012	Leave The Oil Alone / Skidip It Up Dub (7")	Scotch Bonnet
2012	Mungo's Hi Fi* Ft. Omar Perry / Marina P* – Guidency / Troubles And Worries (7")	Scotch Bonnet
2012	Mungo's Hi Fi* Ft. Earl Sixteen / Wild Life – People / Poze Up (7")	Scotch Bonnet
2012	Mungo's Hi Fi* Ft. Kenny Knots – Don't Let Them (7")	Scotch Bonnet
2012	Mungo's Hi Fi* ft. Eek-A-Mouse / Mungo's Hi Fi* ft. Solo Banton & Ruben Da Silva – Kung Fu Know How (12")	Scrub A Dub
2012	Mungo's Hi Fi* Ft. YT / Daddy Scotty* – World News / Wicked Tings A Gwaan (7")	Scotch Bonnet
2012	Mungo's Hi Fi* Ft. Mr Williamz / Sister Carol – Computer Age / Cuture Mi Vote (7")	Scotch Bonnet
2012	Mungo's Hi Fi* Ft. Daddy Freddy – Dread Inna Armagideon / Dutty Diseases Riddim (7")	Scotch Bonnet
2013	Your Love (7", W/Lbl, Ltd)	Scotch Bonnet
2013	Mungo's Hi Fi* Ft Lady Ann – Sound Get A Beating (7")	Scotch Bonnet
2013	Mungo's Hi-Fi Feat Soom T* – Listening Bug (12")	Scrub A Dub
2013	Mungo's Hi-Fi Feat Soom T* – Bong Bong (12")	Scotch Bonnet
2013	Dubplate Master (12")	Scrub A Dub
2014	The Stinger / Dem Stylee (12", Ltd, W/Lbl)	Scrub A Dub
2014	Prince Fatty / Mungo's Hi-Fi – Under Arrest (7")	Mr. Bongo
2014	Prince Fatty / Mungo's Hi-Fi – Scrub A Dub Style (7")	Mr. Bongo
2014	Prince Fatty / Mungo's Hi-Fi – Suger Water (7")	Mr. Bongo
2014	Prince Fatty / Mungo's Hi-Fi – Herbalist / Divorce A L'Italienne (7")	Mr. Bongo
2014	Prince Fatty / Mungo's Hi-Fi – For Me You Are / Say What You're Saying (7")	Mr. Bongo
2014	Mungo's Hi Fi feat Charlie P - Rules of the dance (12")	Scrub a dub
