= Gnoss =

Scottish neotraditional folk band

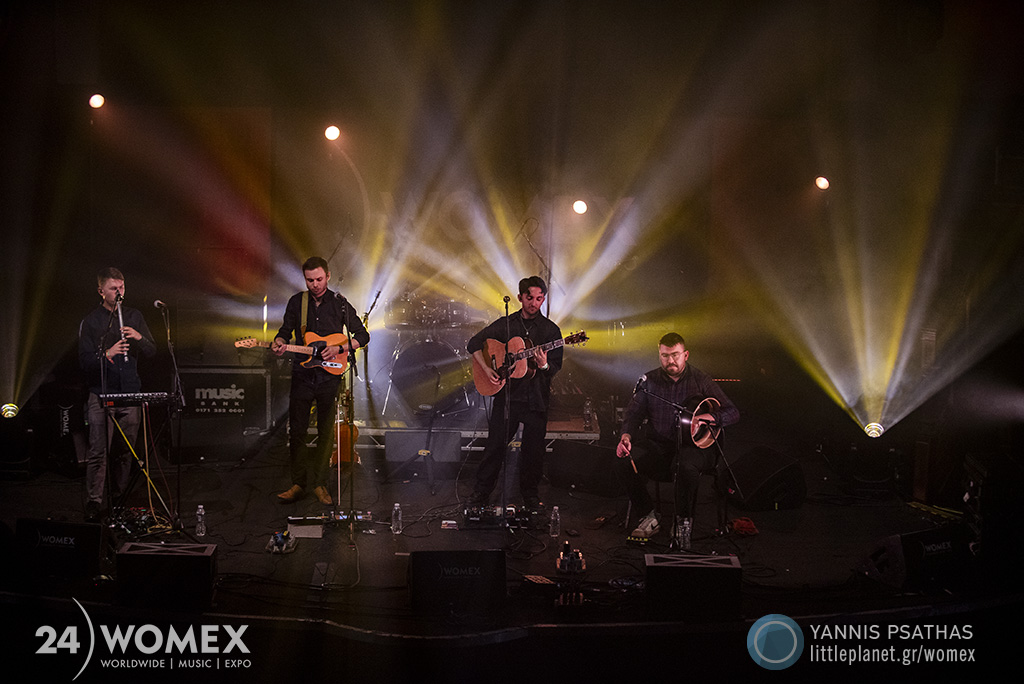
- Gnoss at WOMEX 2024

Background information
- Genres: Scottish folk music
- Years active: 2015–present
- Members: Aidan Moodie (Guitar/Vocals); Graham Rorie (Fiddle/Mandolin/Electric Tenor Guitar); Connor Sinclair (Flute/Whistles/Vocals); Craig Baxter (Bodhran/Percussion)
- Website: gnossmusic.com

Gnoss is a neotraditional Scottish folk band.

== History ==
The band was formed in 2015 by Moodie and Rorie, both from Orkney. Sinclair and Baxter joined soon after. The band has a tradition of naming tracks after relatives to celebrate significant birthdays.

== Musical style ==
Robert McMillen, profiling the band for The Irish News after the release of their third album, wrote that "their signature sound is a rich tapestry of acoustic layers and textures, mixing outstanding musicianship with captivating original songs".

Billy Rough, reviewing their second album for Folk Radio UK, wrote, "Characterised by a tight, cool mood, superbly balanced instrumental harmonies and some rather fetching melodies, the boys have captured a sound dipped in honey."

== Band members ==
- Aidan Moodie (guitar and vocals)
- Graham Rorie (fiddle, mandolin, and electric tenor guitar)
- Connor Sinclair (flute, whistles, and vocals)
- Craig Baxter (bodhrán and percussion)

== Discography ==
Albums

- Drawn From Deep Water (2019)
- The Light of the Moon (2021)
- Stretching Skyward (2023)

Singles & EPs

- Waves (2016)
- The Silver Fox (2017)
- Brother Wind EP (2018)
- Cold Clay (2021)
- The River (2021)
- Dirt & Bone (2022)
- Christine's (2023)
- Keefa Hill (2023)
- Spearhead with Valtos (2023)
- Hjop (2025)
- Emily (2025)
- Bennybeg (2025)
- Wild Deer (2025)
