= Sky Deep =

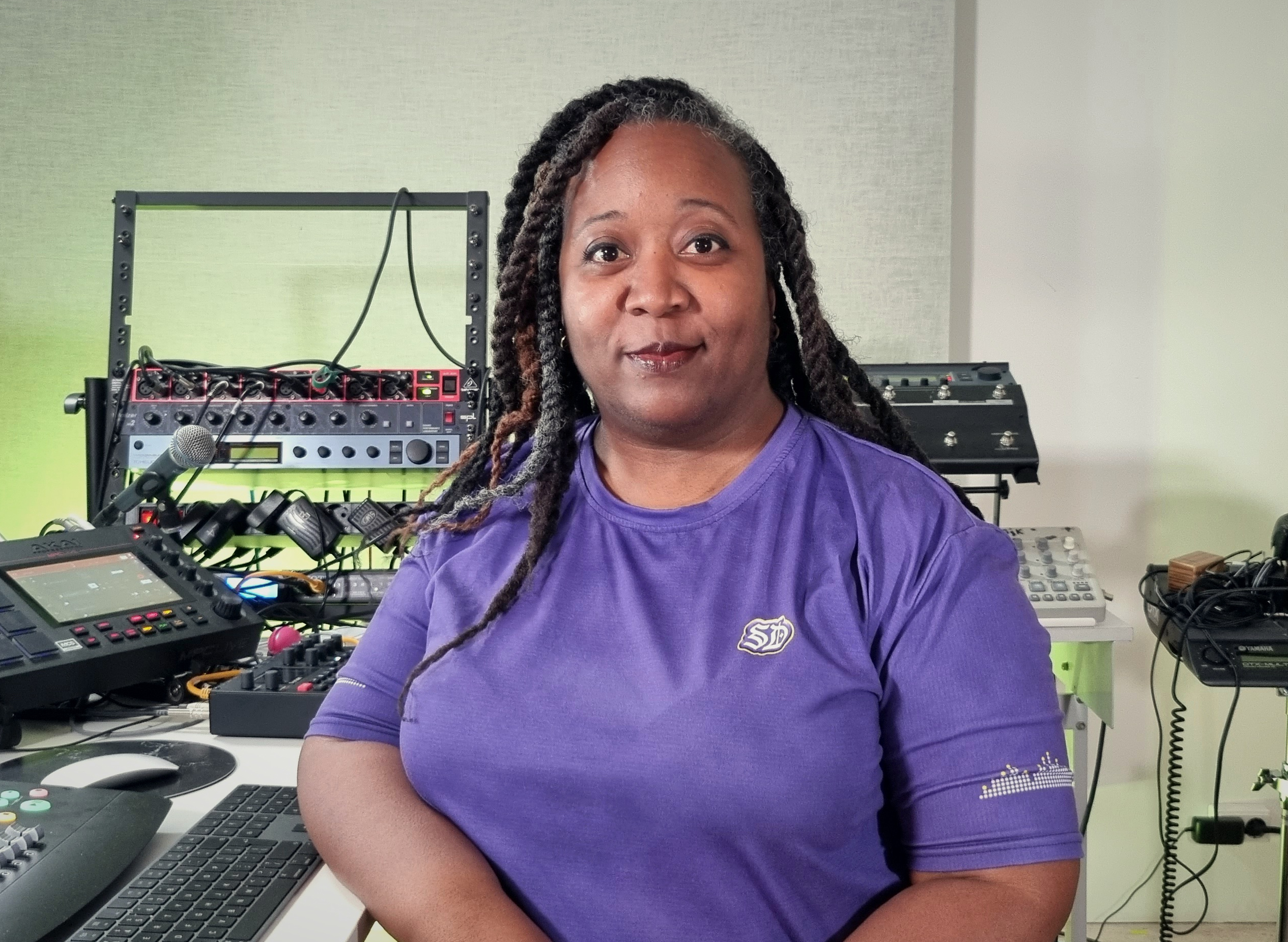
- Sky Deep in a music studio, 2023.

Background information
- Also known as: Sky Dietrich
- Born: New Jersey, U.S.
- Origin: Los Angeles, California, U.S.
- Genres: Dance/Electronic, house, techno
- Occupations: Producer; DJ; composer; filmmaker
- Years active: 2000s–present
- Label: Reveller Records
- Website: www.skydeepofficial.com

Sky Deep is an American electronic music producer, DJ, composer and filmmaker currently based in Berlin, Germany. Her career has spanned electronic dance music, experimental production and various interdisciplinary projects since the 2000s.

Profiled by publications like DJ Mag, Beatportal, FACT and Musikexpress, her work is often discussed within the context of Berlin's electronic music scene and artist-led initiatives. She has also been featured in AfroPunk and Groove Magazine regarding her recorded releases and live performances.

Beyond her solo practice, Sky Deep is involved in collaborative and curatorial projects. Media coverage frequently highlights her participation in artist-run platforms and collectives, alongside her presence at festivals connected to contemporary electronic music culture.

== Early background ==
Sky Deep was born in New Jersey and grew up in Los Angeles, California. Her early engagement with the creative arts included theatrical and music projects during her youth. By 2001, she had moved to the New York Tri-State area, where she continued to develop her career in performance and songwriting. In August 2014, she relocated to Berlin, Germany, a move that marked a shift in her focus toward electronic music production and international live performance.

== Career ==
Sky Deep’s career began as a songwriter and performer before she transitioned into electronic music production and DJing. After working in Los Angeles and New York City, she relocated to Berlin in 2014. Since then, her work has become increasingly centered on electronic music, live performance, and collaborative projects.

In 2012, she founded the independent label Reveller Records, which serves as a platform for her own releases and curated compilation projects. Through this initiative, she has supported new talent within the international electronic music scene. Her recorded output includes various EPs and albums from the mid-to-late 2010s, as well as contributions to soundtracks and electronic music networks.

Sky Deep has also been active as a live performer and touring musician. From 2019 to 2020, she served as a core touring musician and MIDI music director for the artist Peaches during the Only One Peach tour, contributing to live electronic performance and show programming.

Alongside her creative work, she is active in music education. Since 2017, she has been an educator at BIMM University, teaching music-related subjects.

From 2016 to 2017, Sky Deep founded and curated Reclaim the Beats, a Berlin festival focused on artist-driven programming. The festival was established as a platform to center BIPOC and LGBTQ+ perspectives within Berlin's electronic music and arts scene. She is also a member of the international collective female:pressure. In 2016, she represented the collective at the CTM Festival in a presentation regarding the Rojava Revolution compilation alongside İpek İpekçioğlu.

Her recent work includes composing for screen-based projects, notably for the German television series Loving Her (2022–2023).

=== Music production and releases ===
Sky Deep produces electronic music under her own label, Reveller Records, which she founded and continues to manage. She has released several EPs and singles, including Time & Space pt.1 and Hunter. Her 2019 single "Yes I Did" featured a remix by the artist Electrosexual. Both projects received coverage from music media such as Afropunk and FACT Magazine. Her production style often merges elements of Techno, house, and experimental electronics, frequently incorporating multimedia components into live performances and video projects.

In addition to her solo output, she has contributed to compilations curated by the collective female:pressure, including the Rojava Revolution compilation alongside artists such as Zoë Mc Pherson, Olivia Louvel, and İpek İpekçioğlu.

=== Live performance and festivals ===
Sky Deep has performed extensively as a DJ and electronic music producer at festivals and club events, both in Europe and internationally. In 2018, she performed at Tresor Berlin as part of an experimental ensemble featuring Lady Starlight and Lyra Pramuk.

She has curated and performed at her own festival, Reclaim the Beats, which highlights experimental and queer electronic music in Berlin. The festival was structured to function as both a performance platform and an educational space, emphasizing the historical roots of house and techno alongside contemporary live sets. Her live sets are often noted for their use of multimedia, where music is paired with visual projections and video to create an integrated experience. She has shared stages with artists such as Peaches and Ina D., often participating in events that emphasize the work of producers from underrepresented communities.

=== Collaborations ===
Throughout her career, Sky Deep has engaged in various collaborative projects across music and film. Her work with Peaches included serving as a touring musician and MIDI music director, where she assisted with stage shows and live performance programming. In the studio, she has collaborated on remix projects with other electronic producers, including providing a remix for the duo Hyenaz and collaborating with Electrosexual on the single "Yes I Did".

Through Reveller Records, she managed the music contributions for the soundtrack of When We Are Together, Then We Can Be Everywhere (2016). The release included works by The Knife and Karin Dreijer. Additionally, her label handled the HYENAZ edit of the track "Gegen" by Paula Temple.

She has also extended her collaborative reach into audiovisual production, working frequently with director Marit Östberg on projects such as Enactone and When We Are Together, Then We Can Be Everywhere, where she handled post-production audio.

=== Media coverage and recognition ===
Sky Deep’s work has been featured in a variety of international music and culture publications that cover electronic music and independent production. In 2018, DJ Mag published a profile interview discussing her musical practice, label operations, and her role within Berlin’s club and festival scenes. The article contextualized her work within contemporary DJ culture and highlighted her focus on artist-led initiatives.

Beatportal later published a long-form feature detailing her professional background, recorded releases, and collaborations—including her work as a music director for Peaches. The feature traced her evolution from songwriting to electronic production, placing her career within an international framework.

Her recorded output has also been noted in FACT Magazine, particularly within editorial pieces on electronic releases and the female:pressure network and independent label activity.

In 2017, the German magazine Musikexpress documented her participation in the Ableton Loop festival, covering her studio sessions and her technical approach to music production.

Additional coverage has appeared in AfroPunk, which featured her music videos and independent releases, and Groove Magazine, which covered her work as the founder of the Reclaim the Beats festival.

More recently, in January 2026, she appeared on the S.W.E.A.T. podcast hosted by Mad Kate to discuss the intersections of creative labor and electronic music.

== Discography ==
Year	Title	Type	Label	Notes
2015	Rebirth of Deep	EP	Reveller Records	
2016	Time & Space, Part 1	EP	Reveller Records	
2016	"Woman and the Gun"	Track	female:pressure	On Rojava Revolution compilation
2016	When We Are Together Then We Can Be Everywhere	Album	Reveller Records	Soundtrack compilation contribution
2017	Enactone Soundtrack	Album	Reveller Records	Contributions include "Hunter"
2019	Up in Here	EP	Reveller Records	
2019	Swerve	EP	Reveller Records	
2019	Yes I Did	EP	Reveller Records	Includes remix by Electrosexual

== Screen and stage ==
In addition to her work in the music industry, Sky Deep has been active in film since the late 2000s. Her early work in the US included technical positions in the sound department, including as a boom operator for feature films and short films. After moving to Berlin, the artist expanded her repertoire to include directing, screenwriting, and post-production. With her debut feature film Enactone (2016), she established herself as a filmmaker and composer. Her more recent work includes contributions as a sound designer and voice actor, particularly for interdisciplinary science fiction projects such as Shu Lea Cheang's UKI, which received international recognition at institutions such as MoMA.

Sky Deep's directorial debut, the feature film Enactone (2016), was awarded Best Feature Film at the Berlin Porn Film Festival. In 2017, the artist was also honored with the PorYes Award and received the "Hottest Newcomer" award at the Toronto International Porn Film Festival. The film was screened worldwide at numerous festivals, including BFI Flare in London, Queer Lisboa, the Women Make Waves Film Festival in Taiwan, and the Asterisco Festival in Buenos Aires. Further screenings took place at the Glitch Film Festival in Glasgow, the Berlin Art Film Festival, and the Perv Queerotic Film Festival in Sydney, among others.

In 2023, Sky Deep contributed as a sound designer and voice actor to Shu Lea Cheang's science fiction film UKI. The film was shown at the Museum of Modern Art (MoMA) in New York and the LAS Art Foundation in Berlin, among other venues.

Sky Deep also works as a sound designer and composer for various German theaters. In 2023, she designed the sound for the production Macht PAUSE at the Theater an der Parkaue. This work was nominated for the IKARUS Theater Prize. At the Hans Otto Theater in Potsdam, the artist was responsible for the music in the production of Arsenic and Old Lace (Arsen und Spitzenhäubchen). In collaboration with the Ballhaus Naunynstraße, productions such as Caminhos das Águas – Unaufhaltsames Fließen were created. The piece was performed internationally in 2025 at the Festival Internacional de Danza Contemporánea Lila López in Mexico.

=== Film and Television (Selection) ===
Year	Title	Role	Type	Notes
2008	Goyband	Sound department	Feature film	Boom Operator; as Sky Dietrich
2009	My Stuffed Animal Is a Monster	Sound department	Short film	Boom Operator; as Sky Dietrich
2016	Enactone	Director, writer, composer	Feature film	Winner: Best Feature, Berlin Porn Film Festival 2016; Winner: PorYes Award 2017; Winner: Toronto International Porn Film Festival 2017
2022–2023	Loving Her	Composer	TV series	ZDFneo production
2023	UKI	Sound design, voice actor	Feature film	Dir: Shu Lea Cheang; Premiere at MoMA

=== Music Videos ===
Year	Title	Artist	Role	Notes
2016	"Hunter"	Sky Deep	Director, editor	
2017	"Coconut Oil"	Sky Deep	Composer	
2019	"Swerve"	Sky Deep	Composer	
2019	"Yes I Did"	Sky Deep	Director, editor	
