= Syn Festival Edinburgh =

- Date(s): 2014-present
- Frequency: annual
- Location(s): Edinburgh
- Website: http://www.synfestivaledinburgh.co.uk/

Syn Festival Edinburgh is a cultural festival in Edinburgh. Its organisation involves individuals from Southern Europe.

== History and aims ==
Syn Festival first ran in 2014. It is a multi-arts-festival: it comprises musical, cinema, theatre and visual arts events. It has hosted events in numerous venues of Edinburgh, including Upper Church at Summerhall, Adam House, Teviot Row House, Out of the Blue Drill Hall. Syn Festival Edinburgh aims to promote ‘the cultural discourse between South and North, the Mediterranean and Great Britain’. This aim is reflected in the composition of its steering group. While it began as an Edinburgh University Hellenic Society initiative, its steering group has subsequently included people who do not come from Greece. Similarly, its title signifies the intention of its organisers to promote an intercultural dialogue: as its website notes, ‘Syn means “with” or “together with”, as well as signifying mathematical addition in Greek’.

== Collaboration ==
Syn Festival Edinburgh has collaborated with the Drama International Short Film Festival, the Be-There Animation Festival, and the Alba New Music Festival. It has also co-operated with Edinburgh Greek Festival, hosting visual arts exhibitions that accompanied the themes of the films screened by the latter.

== 2014, 2015 ==
Two festivals were held in Teviot Row House in March 2014 and May 2015, and two exhibitions in Edinburgh Filmhouse in collaboration with the Edinburgh Greek Festival.

== 2016 ==
The 2016 festival revolved around the theme of the ‘Mediterranean’. The aim of the organisers was also to encourage a dialogue around refugees crossing the Mediterranean.

== 2017 ==
In 2017, the Festival featured over 100 emerging artists, performers, musicians and filmmakers. Part of the Festival was the visual arts exhibition “Metamorphosis-Transformation”, which ran from 9–22 March at the Out of the Blue Drill Hall. In the context of this visual arts exhibition, 21 artists engaged with Scottish, Greek and, more broadly, European mythologies. These artists were: Mhairi Bell-Moodie, Michael Dawson, Alex Hackett and Alix Villanueva, Rebecca Holloway, Яachel Lee, Axe Marnie, Julia Alexandra Mee, Ursula Mestre, Fionnuala Mottishaw, Georgia Murray, Kyle Noble, Ioanna Papadimitriou, Paraskevi Papagianni, Tonia Papapetrou, Despina Petridou, Marissa Stoffer, Roween Suess, Jacqueline Thow, Christopher Philip Ward, Susana Wessling. The 2017 Festival also included a Greek night with music, dance and food from that country.

== 2019 ==
In 2019, the Festival hosted the exhibition entitled 'Utopias'. This exhibition involved 18 artists who built on Thomas More's Utopia. The Festival also included the ‘Feel the Vibes | Band Night’. This event featured seven bands playing diverse music genres: world folk music, Klezmer, Jazz, Blues, Funk fusion, Ska and Reggae as well Industrial Live Drumcore.

== 2020, 2021 ==
Syn Festival Edinburgh has run no events in 2020 and in 2021 (as of July 2021).
