= Southside Film Festival (Glasgow) =

Annual film festival held in Glasgow, Scotland

The Southside Film Festival is an annual film festival based in Glasgow, Scotland, UK. It is run by Southside Film.

== History ==
The first Southside Film Festival was in 2011 in response to the lack of cinemas in the Southside of Glasgow and there has been an annual film festival since then. Southside Film also run screenings throughout the year in various venues but primarily in The Glad Cafe, Govanhill Baths and Pollok House. The festival is volunteer run and is a community interest company.

== See also ==
- Culture in Glasgow
- List of festivals in Glasgow
- SouthSide Film Festival
