= GLITCH Film Festival =

LGBTQ film festival in Scotland

- GLITCH Film Festival Promotional Logo - 2015

GLITCH was a QTIBIPOC (Queer, Trans, Intersex, Black, Indigenous, and People of Colour) focused film festival which ran in Glasgow from 2015 - 2019.

Founded by Festival Director Nosheen Khwaja with Cloudberry MacLean the festival aimed to address the under representation of queer people of colour in film.

The festival was based at the Centre of Contemporary Arts, with editions held biennially, in 2015, 2017, and 2019.

GLITCH was an extension of the charity Digital Desperados, which existed to help empower queer people of colour in filmmaking. Their approach was encapsulated in the festival description: "We are a glitch in the system, our lives deny the lies, our complexity is dissent, we fight for love".

The festival was notable for its accessibility - films were free and all screenings were subtitled with live events BSL interpreted. It was the first non-disabled festival to subtitle all its films in 2015.

GLITCH was supported by Creative Scotland, Film Hub Scotland and The Equality Network.

== See also ==
List of LGBT film festivals
