= 3 Daft Monkeys =

British band

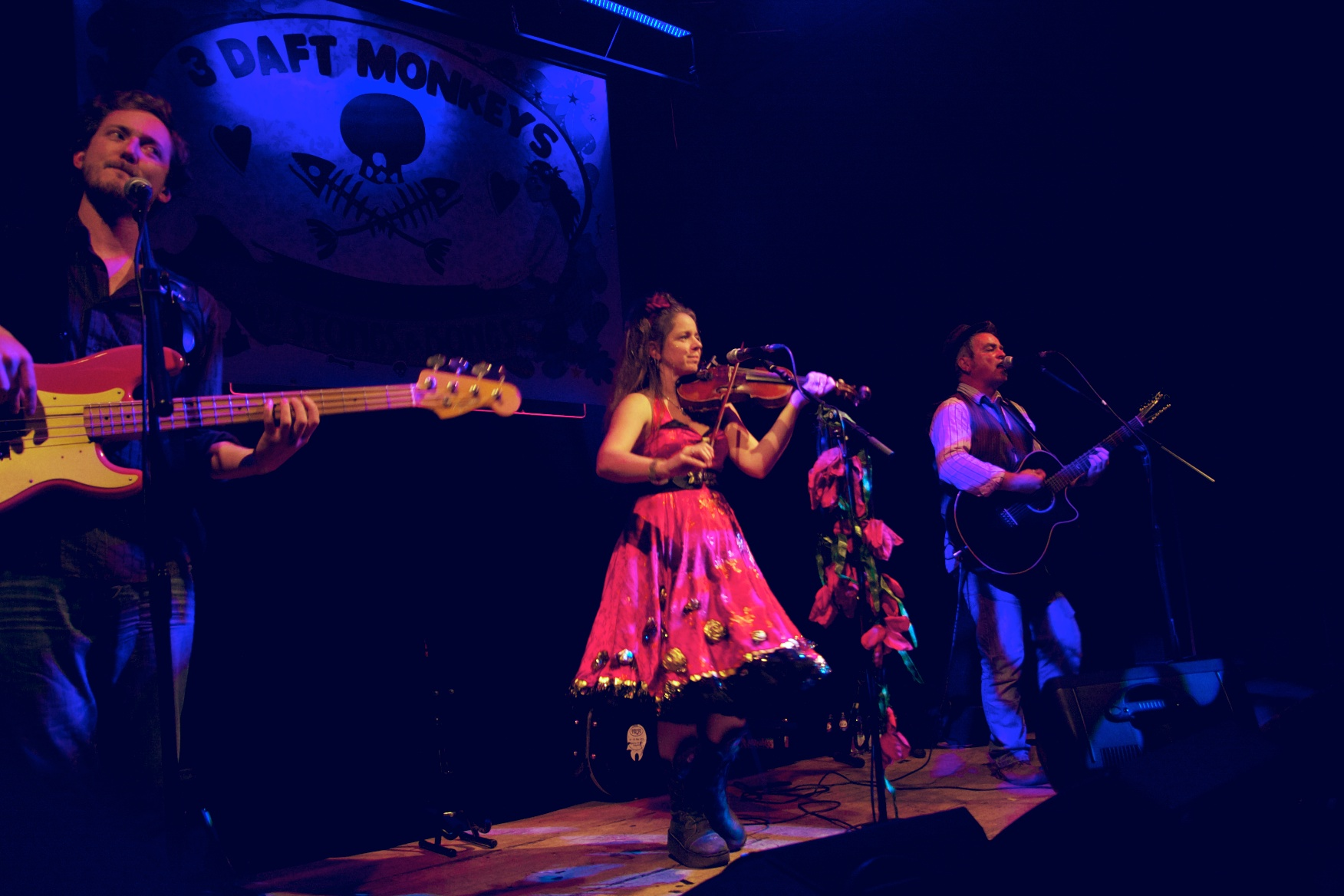
- 3 Daft Monkeys

Background information
- Also known as: Three Daft Monkeys
- Origin: Cornwall, UK
- Genre: Folk
- Years active: 2000 – present
- Members: Tim Ashton; Athene Roberts; Rich Mulryne; Jamie Graham
- Past members: Jamie Waters; Lukas Drinkwater
- Website: http://www.3daftmonkeys.co.uk

3 Daft Monkeys are a world music-influenced acoustic band from Cornwall, UK, consisting of Tim Ashton, Athene Roberts, Rich Mulryne, and Jamie Graham. The instrumentation consists of vocals, fiddle, twelve-string guitar, bass guitar and percussion. The band's musical influences include Celtic, Balkan, Romani, Latino, electronic dance, reggae, dub, punk rock, and traditional folk music.

The band have performed at venues and festivals all over the UK and Europe, including being invited by Show of Hands to play the main stage at the Eden Project and the 2008 BBC Proms at St David's Hall in Cardiff. Other performances include GuilFest, Lakefest festival^{[6],} Folkwoods in the Netherlands, the Glastonbury Festival, the Trowbridge Village Pump Festival, Folk Segovia in Spain, Lorient Interceltic Festival in France, Kevelaer World Music Festival in Germany, Labadoux Festival in Belgium, Buskers Bern Street Festival in Switzerland, and the Beautiful Days, Bearded Theory, and Larmer Tree festivals.

Throughout the 2000s, the band were a regular support act for The Levellers, with Roberts usually returning to join the Levellers onstage for the finale in a duelling fiddle-off of "What You Know" with added tambourine from Waters and tin-whistle from Ashton.

Between March 2020 and June 2021, the band played over sixty 'Cyberbusks' online due to the various lockdowns and restrictions imposed during the COVID-19 pandemic. Tim and Athene also collaborated with Scott Doonican of The Bar-Steward Sons of Val Doonican on a cover of the Beatles' Being for the Benefit of Mr. Kite!. From July 2021, 3 Daft Monkeys were able to resume touring and played several major festivals including returns to Beautiful Days and Hawkfest.

The band have enjoyed airplay on BBC Radio 2, BBC Radio Ulster, BBC Radio Cornwall, and BBC Radio Wales, and have been described by presenter Mike Harding as "a brilliant band... absolutely amazing".

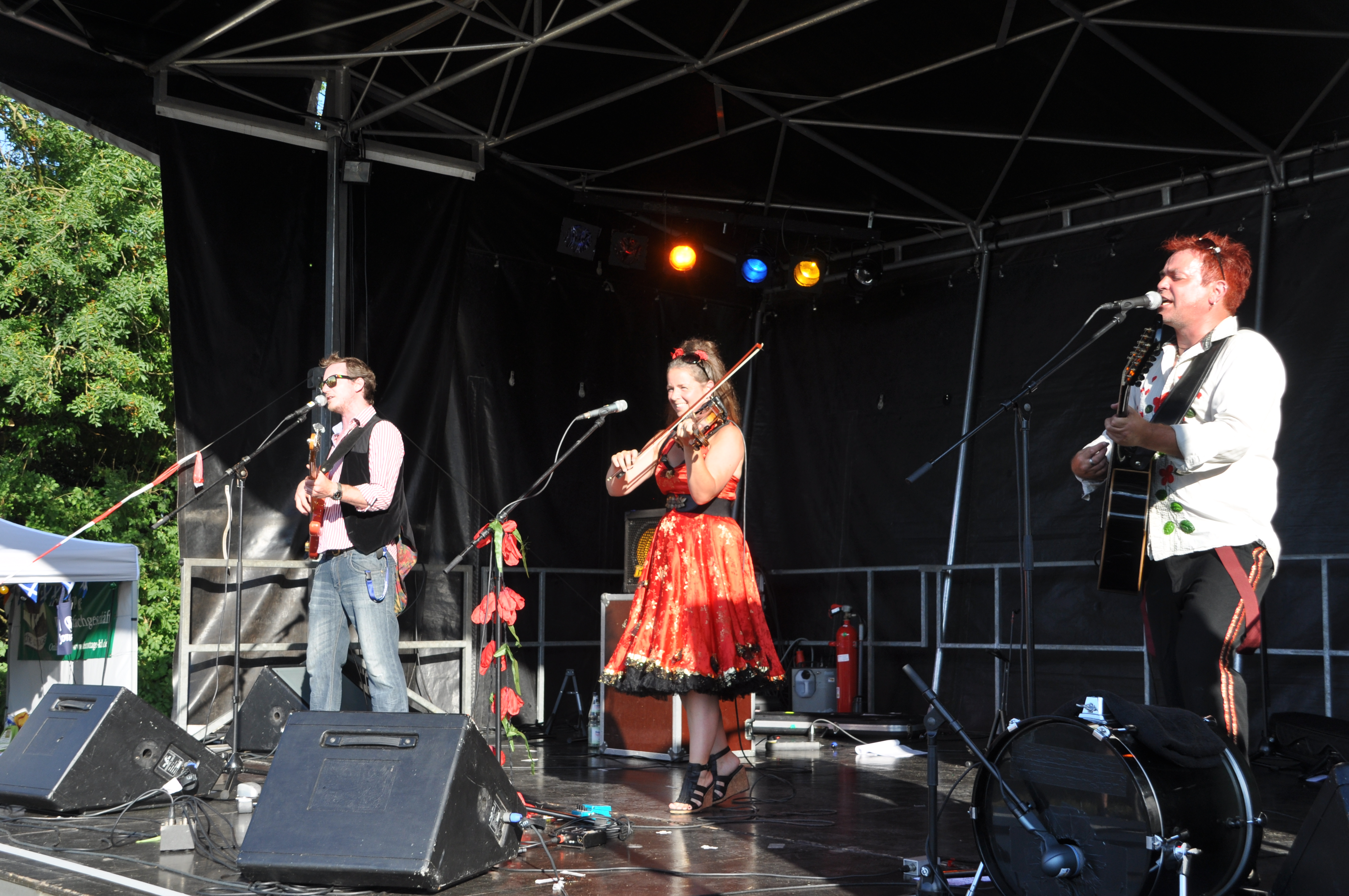
3 Daft Monkeys performing at the festival "Folk am Neckar" 2013

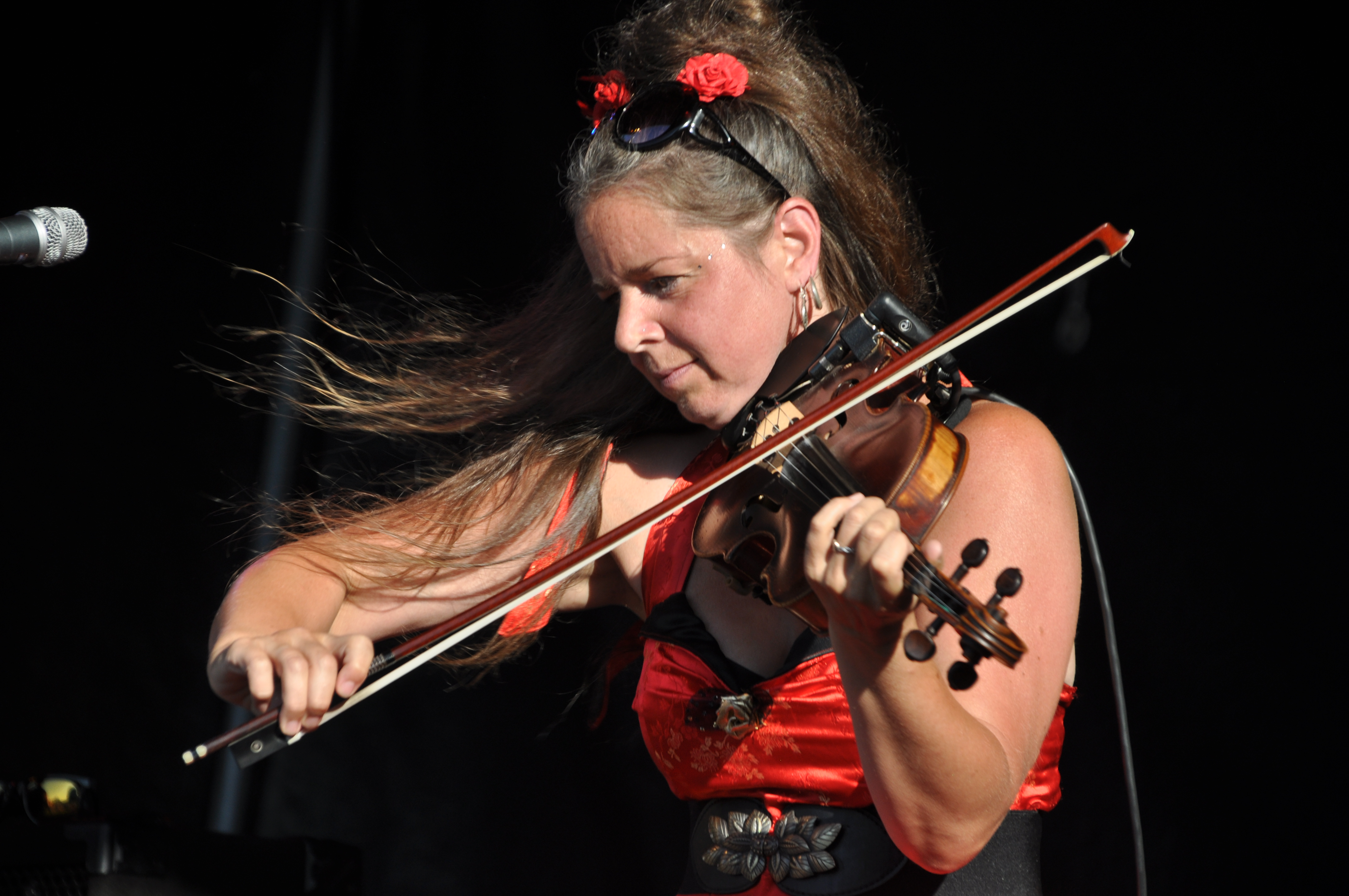
Athene Roberts

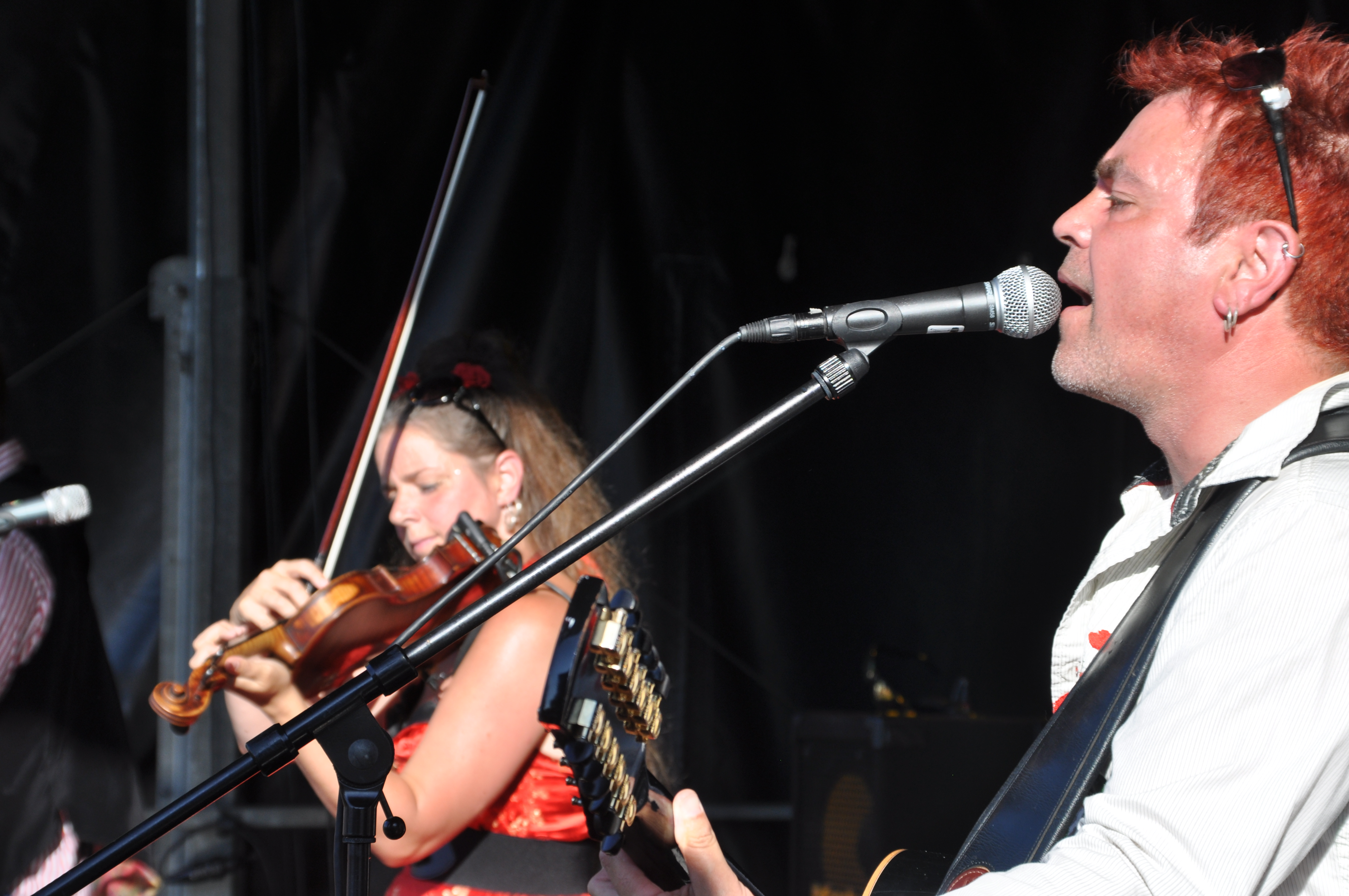
Tim Ashton

== Line-up changes ==
The band's first album, Brouhaha, featured Rich Mulryne on djembe, kick drum, cymbals, tambourine and saucepan. From Ooomim onwards Waters played bass. Mulryne rejoined the band as a guest drummer for the album The Antiquated and the Arcane, and has since rejoined as a full member.

In 2011, Lukas Drinkwater joined the band as a temporary replacement for Jamie Waters for the summer tour, and later joined permanently after Waters stepped down. In 2015, Jamie Graham took over playing bass.

== Releases ==
=== Brouhaha (2000) ===
Six songs recorded in Cornwall in 2000 with the band's original line-up.

1. Wonderful
2. 3 Daft Monkeys
3. Nothing
4. Maximillian
5. Saturn Returns
6. Global Junkie

=== Ooomim (2002) ===
Eight songs recorded in Germany, during October 2001 and released in 2002.

1. Faces
2. Ooomim
3. We Be
4. Weird-Id
5. Crimson Eyes
6. Chuffy
7. Cheerio
8. For the Wedding

=== Hubbadillia (2004) ===
Ten songs recorded by Mark Tucker at Presshouse Studios, Devon during the summer of 2004, released December 2004.

1. Hubbadillia
2. Hey Listen
3. Trez Cerveza
4. Air
5. Astral Eyes
6. Bubbles
7. The Man
8. Stop
9. Timeless
10. Does My Head In

=== Gibbon It Live and Dreckly (2007) ===
12 tracks recorded live at various venues during 2006.

1. Broygas Tantz
2. Hubbadillia
3. Tres Cerveza
4. 3 Daft Monkeys
5. One Fine Day
6. Ooomim
7. Social Vertigo
8. Astral Eyes
9. Hey Listen
10. Faces
11. Maximillian
12. Mazoltov

=== Go Tell the Bees EP (2007) ===
Showcasing three new tracks from the band's forthcoming album, plus one old favourite.

1. Go Tell the Bees [Radio Edit]
2. Paranoid Big Brother
3. Social Vertigo [Radio Edit]
4. Astral Eyes [Remastered]

=== Social Vertigo (2008) ===
13 Tracks recorded with Mark Tucker during 2007 at Green Room Studios. Includes guest musicians on cello, brass, and percussion.

1. Paranoid Big Brother
2. Eyes of Gaia
3. Human Nature (Prelude)
4. Human Nature
5. Go Tell the Bees
6. Guardian Angel
7. Since
8. One Fine Day
9. Social Vertigo
10. Little Secret
11. Let 'Em In
12. Monkey & the Slippers
13. Dance of the Old Man of Storr

=== The Antiquated and the Arcane (2010) ===
1. The Antiquated and The Arcane
2. Under One Sun
3. Just A Ride
4. Doors of Perception
5. Days of the Dance
6. Perfect Stranger
7. Time To Evolve
8. Casualties of Tour
9. Civilised Debauchery
10. She Said
11. Love (SIC) Fool
12. Love Life
13. Masquerade Parade (bonus track on downloads only)

=== Of Stones and Bones (2013) ===
1. Agnes the Giant Killer
2. Sarah, the Devil and Jack
3. The Lovers of Porthgwarra Cove
4. Jenny and the Changeling
5. World on its Head
6. The Tale of the Laziest Pirate
7. Morwenna
8. The Pellars of Zennor
9. Reverend Hawker of Morwenstow
10. One and All
11. The Stranger

=== Year of the Clown (2017) ===
1. Year of the Clown
2. Delighted to be Invited
3. Drink with God
4. Money
5. Look to the Stars
6. 1,000 Years
7. I Love You
8. Blessings
9. Animal
10. To Dream of Angels
11. Not in my Name
12. We are Revolution

=== Year of the Cyberbusk (2021) ===
A limited-edition 2-Disc DVD set chronicling the previous years' series of 'Cyberbusks'. Due to the ongoing COVID-19 pandemic, the band were only able to meet up a handful of times so instead they met up 'online' each Sunday (for over 60 weeks) to play an hour's set. The DVDs contain a compilation of some of the most memorable moments from those sessions plus excerpts from the few outdoor gigs they were able to do together.

== Film appearances ==
The band played the part of buskers in the Cornish film Darralla Jooan Choy an Horr (trans. The Tale of John of Chyannor), winner of the Audience Award at the 2004 Goel Fylm Kernow (Cornwall Film Festival). In 2015, Athene took a role in Tulip Fever, directed by Justin Chadwick.
