= Solo Banton =

Musical artist

Edward Ronald Browne, known professionally as Solo Banton, is a dub-reggae and dancehall artist based in the United Kingdom. He has released four albums highlighting a range of influences including roots reggae, dancehall, soul music, and hip-hop.

The Canary has called Banton "one of the pioneers of UK reggae and a legend within the movement".

== Early life ==
Browne was born London. His family has roots in St Kitts and Nevis in the Caribbean. Browne first started MC'ing at age 11.

== Career ==
He emerged from UK sound system culture as an expressive and often comical deejay, committed to conscious lyrics and "edutainment". He was first known simply as Solo, and was active in the UK hip hop and graffiti scene. He took up the Banton part of his name after switching to reggae music.

He released his first album Walk Like Rasta on Reality Shock Records in 2010, followed by Higher Levels and Old Raggamuffin in 2012 and 2019. His 2024 album In This Time was released on the French label, Irie Ites Records.

Solo Banton has collaborated on recordings with Jahtari, Roots Manuva, Macka B, Fantan Mojah, Mungo's Hi-Fi, Errol Dunkley, Tippa Irie, Soom T, Dubkasm, Radikal Guru, George Palmer, Benny Page, Kris Kemist, Manudigital and many others, with over 50 releases to his name.
