= Amy Macdonald discography =

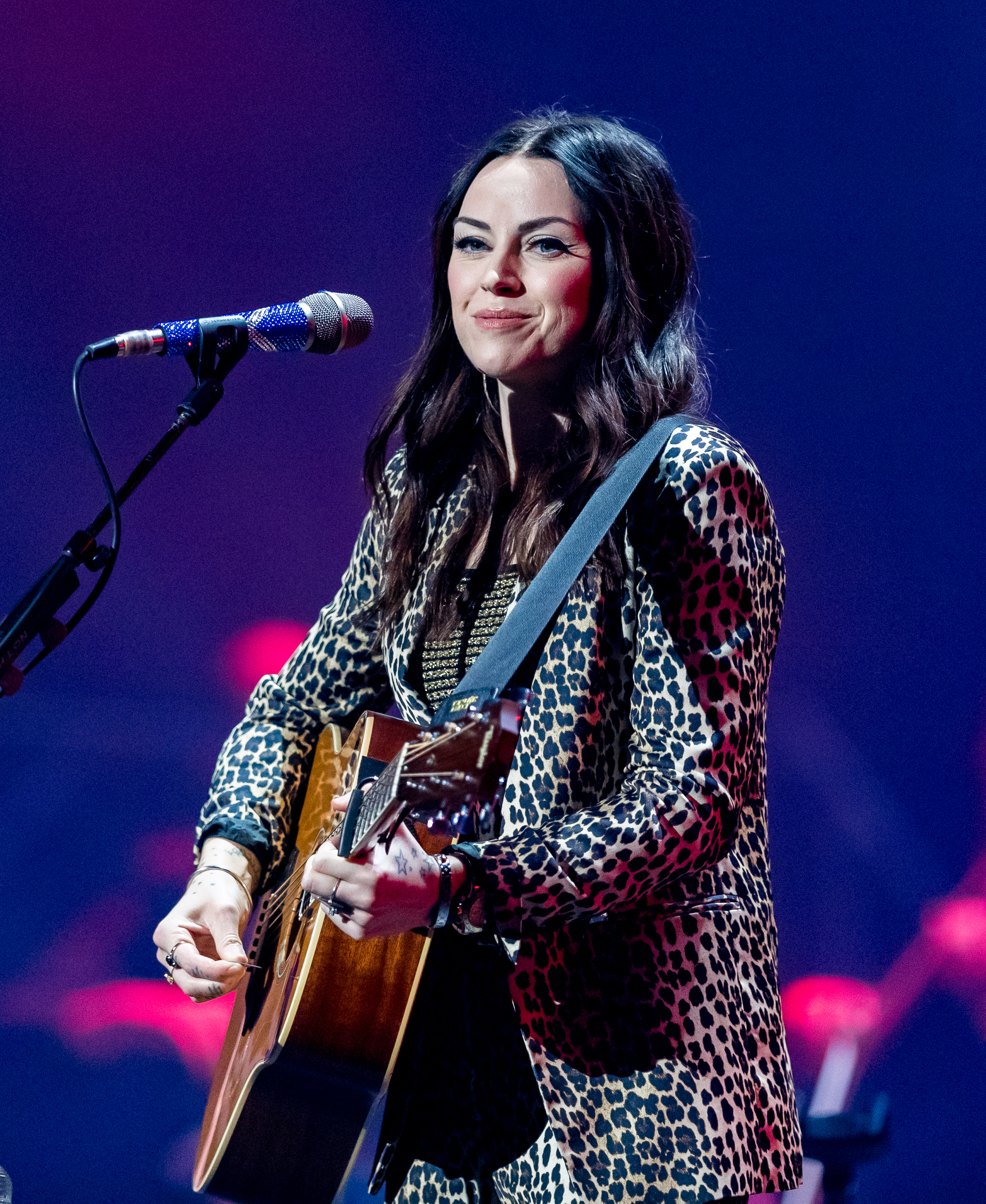
- Amy Macdonald performing live during Night of the Proms in Germany, 2022
- Studio albums: 6
- Live albums: 4
- Compilation albums: 1
- Singles: 24
- B-sides: 15
- Music videos: 23

The discography of Scottish singer Amy Macdonald consists of six studio albums, four live albums, one compilation album, twenty-four singles and music videos, as well as fifteen additional B-sides. Her debut album, This Is the Life, was released in July 2007, peaking at number one in the United Kingdom, Denmark, the Netherlands, Mexico, Scotland and Switzerland. The title track reached number nineteen on the US Adult Alternative Airplay charts, which resulted in the album charting at number ninety-two on the US Billboard 200. The album spawned an additional four singles – "Poison Prince", "Mr Rock & Roll", "L.A.", and "Run".

Her second album, A Curious Thing, was released in March 2010, peaking at number one in Germany, Austria and Switzerland, number two in Scotland, Belgium, Greece and the Netherlands, and number four in the United Kingdom. The album was supported by its lead single, "Don't Tell Me That It's Over", along with an additional four singles – "Spark", "This Pretty Face", "Love Love" and "Your Time Will Come". Her third album, Life in a Beautiful Light, was released in June 2012, debuting at number one on the Scottish Albums Charts and at number two on the UK Albums Chart. It also reached number one in Germany and Austria. It spawned the singles "Slow It Down", "Pride" and "4th of July".

Her fourth album, Under Stars, was released in February 2017, peaking at number two on both the Scottish and UK Albums Chart, whilst reaching number one in Switzerland. The album includes the singles "Dream On", "Automatic" and "Down by the Water". Her fifth studio album, The Human Demands, was released in October 2020, and spawned the singles "The Hudson", "Crazy Shade of Blue" and "Fire". In 2021, she represented Scotland at the Free European Song Contest 2021 with the song "Statues", finishing in fourth place with 77 points.

She released her first compilation album in 2017, Woman of the World (The Best of 2007–2018), and in 2022, released her first extended play, Don't Tell Me That It's Over. Her sixth studio album, Is This What You've Been Waiting For?, was released on 11 July 2025. As of 2018, her estimated total record sales stood at over 12 million worldwide.

== Albums ==
=== Studio albums ===
Title	Details	Peak chart positions										Certifications (sales thresholds)	Sales
Title	Details	SCO	UK	AUT	BEL	DEN	GER	IRE	NL	SWE	SWI	Certifications (sales thresholds)	Sales
This Is the Life	Released: 30 July 2007; Label: Vertigo; Formats: Digital download, LP, CD	1	1	3	2	1	3	16	1	5	1	UK: 896,638	BPI: 3× Platinum; BEA: Platinum; BVMI: 5× Platinum; GLF: Gold; IFPI: 2× Platinum; IFPI AUT: 2× Platinum; IFPI SWI: 4× Platinum
A Curious Thing	Released: 8 March 2010; Label: Mercury; Formats: Digital download, LP, CD	2	4	1	2	7	1	26	2	5	1	UK: 267,841	BPI: Platinum; BEA: Gold; BVMI: 2× Platinum; IFPI AUT: Platinum; IFPI SWI: 2× Platinum
Life in a Beautiful Light	Released: 11 June 2012; Label: Mercury; Formats: Digital download, LP, CD	1	2	1	4	9	1	5	5	34	2	UK: 174,161	BPI: Gold; BVMI: Platinum; IFPI SWI: Platinum
Under Stars	Released: 17 February 2017; Label: Mercury; Formats: Digital download, LP, CD	2	2	4	21	—	2	75	18	—	1		BPI: Silver; BVMI: Gold; IFPI: Gold
The Human Demands	Released: 30 October 2020; Label: BMG; Formats: Digital download, LP, CD	2	10	7	44	—	4	—	42	—	2		
Is This What You've Been Waiting For?	Released: 11 July 2025; Label: BMG; Formats: Digital download, LP, CD, streaming	1	8	3	17	—	4	—	56	—	3		
"—" denotes an album that did not chart or was not released.

=== Compilation albums ===
Title	Details	Peak chart positions						Certifications (sales thresholds)
Title	Details	SCO	UK	AUT	BEL	GER	SWI	Certifications (sales thresholds)
Woman of the World (The Best of 2007–2018)	Released: 23 November 2018; Label: Mercury; Formats: Digital download, LP, CD	19	46	29	93	22	19	BPI: Silver

=== Live albums ===
Title	Details	Peak chart positions
Title	Details	SWI
Live from Glasgow	Released: 1 October 2007; Label: Mercury; Formats: Digital download	—
iTunes Festival: London 2010	Released: 21 July 2010; Label: Mercury; Formats: Digital download	—
Love Love UK & European Arena Tour LIVE 2010	Released: 25 April 2011; Label: Concert Live; Formats: Digital download, LP, CD	89
Under Stars (Live in Berlin)	Released: 24 November 2017; Label: Mercury; Formats: Digital download, CD	—
"—" denotes an album that did not chart or was not released.

== Extended plays ==
Title	Details
Don't Tell Me That It's Over	Released: July 7, 2022; Label: BMG; Format: Digital download, streaming

== Singles ==
=== As lead artist ===
Title	Year	Peak chart positions										Certifications (sales thresholds)	Album
Title	Year	SCO	UK	AUT	BEL	DEN	GER	NL	NOR	SWE	SWI	Certifications (sales thresholds)	Album
"Poison Prince"	2007	20	141	—	—	—	66	—	—	—	58		This Is the Life
"Mr Rock & Roll"	2007	1	12	19	4	—	21	7	20	59	3	BPI: Gold; BEA: Gold; BVMI: Gold	This Is the Life
"L.A."	2007	5	48	—	—	—	—	—	—	—	—		This Is the Life
"This Is the Life"	2007	17	28	1	1	8	2	1	1	3	2	BPI: 2× Platinum; BEA: Platinum; BVMI: 5× Gold; IFPI SWI: Gold; IFPI DAN: Platinum	This Is the Life
"Run"	2008	16	75	—	64	—	36	96	—	—	—		This Is the Life
"Don't Tell Me That It's Over"	2010	21	48	10	7	—	6	29	—	—	4	IFPI SWI: Gold	A Curious Thing
"Spark"	2010	—	—	74	44	—	56	—	—	—	62		A Curious Thing
"This Pretty Face"	2010	92	138	56	64	—	49	—	—	—	—		A Curious Thing
"Love Love"	2010	—	183	—	63	—	—	—	—	—	—		A Curious Thing
"Your Time Will Come"	2010	—	—	—	—	—	—	—	—	—	—		A Curious Thing
"Slow It Down"	2012	16	45	43	65	—	38	—	—	—	24	BVMI: Gold	Life in a Beautiful Light
"Pride"	2012	87	187	—	89	—	—	—	—	—	—		Life in a Beautiful Light
"4th of July"	2012	—	—	—	—	—	—	—	—	—	—		Life in a Beautiful Light
"Dream On"	2017	28	— (Note: "Dream On" did not enter the UK Singles Chart, but peaked at number 62 on the UK Singles Downloads Chart.)	—	84	—	—	—	—	—	32		Under Stars
"Automatic"	2017	—	—	—	—	—	—	—	—	—	—		Under Stars
"Down by the Water"	2017	—	—	—	—	—	—	—	—	—	—		Under Stars
"This Christmas Day"	2017	57	—	—	—	—	—	—	—	—	—		Non-album single
"Woman of the World"	2018	—	—	—	—	—	—	—	—	—	—		Woman of the World (The Best of 2007–2018)
"This Time's Everything"	2019	—	—	—	—	—	—	—	—	—	—		Woman of the World (The Best of 2007–2018)
"The Hudson"	2020	12	— (Note: "The Hudson" did not enter the UK Singles Chart, but peaked at number 55 on the UK Singles Downloads Chart.)	—	—	—	—	—	—	—	—		The Human Demands
"Crazy Shade of Blue"	2020	—	—	—	—	—	—	—	—	—	—		The Human Demands
"Fire"	2020	—	—	—	—	—	—	—	—	—	—		The Human Demands
"Statues"	2021	—	— (Note: "Statues" did not enter the UK Singles Chart, but peaked at number 58 on the UK Singles Downloads Chart.)	—	—	—	—	—	—	—	—		The Human Demands
"Bridges"	2021	—	—	—	—	—	—	—	—	—	—		The Human Demands
"Is This What You've Been Waiting For?"	2025	—	— (Note: "Is This What You've Been Waiting For?" did not enter the UK Singles Chart, but peaked at number 40 on the UK Singles Downloads Chart.)	—	—	—	—	—	—	—	—		Is This What You've Been Waiting For?
"Forward"	2025	—	—	—	—	—	—	—	—	—	—		Is This What You've Been Waiting For?
"Can You Hear Me?"	2025	—	—	—	—	—	—	—	—	—	—		Is This What You've Been Waiting For?
"—" denotes a single that did not chart or was not released.

=== As featured artist ===
Title	Year	Peak chart positions			Album
Title	Year	AUT	GER	SWI	Album
"Oh My Love" (Rea Garvey featuring Amy MacDonald)	2014	36	35	24	Pride

== Other appearances ==
Title	Year	Album
"Tread Lightly"	2013	A Concert for Kirsty MacColl
"Fairytale of New York" (with Dave Duffy)	2013	A Concert for Kirsty MacColl
"Oh My Love" (Rea Garvey feat. Amy MacDonald)	2014	Pride

== Music videos ==
Title	Year	Director
"Poison Prince"	2007	
"Mr Rock & Roll"	2007	Philip Clyde-Smith
"L.A."	2007	Dani Jacobs
"This Is the Life"	2007	Lindy Heyman
"Run"	2008	Lindy Heyman
"Poison Prince" (2008 version)	2008	Philip Clyde-Smith
"Don't Tell Me That It's Over"	2010	
"Spark"	2010	
"This Pretty Face"	2010	
"Love Love"	2010	
"Your Time Will Come"	2010	Philip Clyde-Smith
"Slow It Down"	2012	Pip
"Pride"	2012	
"4th of July"	2013	
"Dream On"	2017	
"Automatic"	2017	
"Down by the Water"	2017	Chris Turner
"This Christmas Day"	2017	
"Woman of the World"	2018	
"The Hudson"	2020	Rubber
"Crazy Shade of Blue"	2020	Jackson Ducasse
"Fire"	2020	Jackson Ducasse
"Statues"	2021	Jackson Ducasse
"Is This What You've Been Waiting For?"	2025	Jackson Ducasse
"Can You Hear Me?"	2025	Chris Turner
"I’m Done (Games That You Play)"	2025	Chris Turner
