= Woman of the World (The Best of 2007–2018) =

Compilation album by Amy Macdonald
- Released: 23 November 2018
- Recorded: 2006–2017
- Genre: Pop
- Length: 1:00:07
- Label: Mercury Records
- Producers: Pete Wilkinson; Paul Adam; Joe Fields; Ash Howes; Richard "Biff" Stannard; Ben Parker; Andrew Britton; Mikey Rowe; Tim Bran; Roy Kerr; Matt Jones

Amy Macdonald chronology
Under Stars (Live in Berlin) (2017)	Woman of the World (The Best of 2007–2018) (2018)	The Human Demands (2020)

Singles from Woman of the World (The Best of 2007–2018)
- 1. "Woman of the World" Released: September 2018; 2. "This Time's Everything" Released: 27 February 2019

Woman of the World (The Best of 2007–2018) is a compilation album by Scottish singer-songwriter Amy Macdonald, released on 23 November 2018 by Mercury Records. To support the albums release, Macdonald announced a European tour to promote its release, which took place between March and April 2019.

== Background ==
The album includes all of her greatest hits including "Mr Rock & Roll" and "This Is the Life", plus two new songs, "Woman of the World" and "Come Home"; both songs are included in the film Patrick. Talking about the album, Macdonald said, "I remember the week of the 30th July 2007 – I released my first ever album This Is The Life, and I wasn’t quite sure how I found myself in that position. My album was number 1 in countries I’d never even been to before [...] 10 years later people were still interested. I just felt that after such an incredible journey it was time to look back and feel proud of everything that has happened."

The albums release was supported by two singles – the lead single "Woman of the World" was released in September 2018, with the second and final single, "This Time's Everything", released in February 2019.

== Commercial performance ==
Upon release, Woman of the World achieved moderate success in continental Europe. It charted at number 46 on the UK Albums Chart, where it spent one week within the UK Top 100. In her native Scotland, it charted at number 19 on the Scottish Albums Charts, remaining in the top 100 of the Scottish Albums Charts into January 2019, spending a total of nine week on the chart. In February 2026, Woman of the World earned a Silver certification from the British Phonographic Industry for sales in excess of 60,000 copies.

Elsewhere in Europe, it charted at number 19 on the Swiss Hitparade Albums Chart, spending a combined total of ten weeks on the chart, re–appearing in the top 100 at number 94 in April 2019. In Germany, it peaked at number 22, spending four weeks on the German Albums Chart, number 29 in Austria, number 93 on the Ultratop Flanders Chart and 130 on the Ultratop Wallonia Chart in Belgium.

== Track listings ==
Woman of the World (The Best of 2007–2018) – Standard edition
No.	Title	Writer(s)	Producer(s)	Length
1.	"This Is the Life"	Amy Macdonald	Pete Wilkinson; Paul Adam; Joe Fields	3:04
2.	"Mr Rock & Roll"	Macdonald	Wilkinson; Adam; Fields	3:34
3.	"Slow It Down"	Macdonald	Wilkinson; Adam	3:53
4.	"Dream On"	Macdonald; Ben Parker; James Sims	Andrew Britton; Mikey Rowe; Ash Howes	3:19
5.	"What Happiness Means to Me"	Macdonald	Wilkinson; Adam; Fields	4:55
6.	"Woman of the World"	Macdonald; Parker; Sims	Richard Stannard; Howes	3:33
7.	"Poison Prince"	Macdonald	Wilkinson; Adam; Fields	3:26
8.	"From the Ashes"	Macdonald; Parker; Sims	Tim Bran; Roy Kerr	3:35
9.	"Pride"	Macdonald	Wilkinson; Adam	3:22
10.	"Run"	Macdonald	Wilkinson; Adam; Fields	3:48
11.	"Down by the Water" (Acoustic)	Macdonald; Parker; Sims	Parker	3:27
12.	"Don't Tell Me That It's Over"	Macdonald	Wilkinson; Adam; Fields	3:15
13.	"Give It All Up" (Simon Mayo Drivetime Live Session)	Macdonald		3:31
14.	"Come Home"	Macdonald; Parker; Sims	Matt Jones	3:13
15.	"Left That Body Long Ago"	Macdonald	Wilkinson; Adam	4:46
16.	"Let's Start a Band" (live from Berlin Tempodrome)	Macdonald		5:24

Woman of the World (The Best of 2007–2018) – Super deluxe boxset (bonus CD)
No.	Title	Writer(s)	Producer(s)	Length
1.	"This Time's Everything"	Macdonald; Parker; Sims	Jones	2:49
2.	"Woman of the World" (Drovers Inn Session)			3:45
3.	"This is the Life" (Drovers Inn Session)			3:31
4.	"Mr. Rock and Roll" (Drovers Inn Session)			3:41

== Charts ==
Chart (2018)	Peak position
Austrian Albums (Ö3 Austria)	29
Belgian Albums (Ultratop Flanders)	93
Belgian Albums (Ultratop Wallonia)	130
German Albums (Offizielle Top 100)	22
Scottish Albums (Official Charts)	19
Swiss Albums (Schweizer Hitparade)	19
UK Albums (Official Charts)	46

== Certifications ==
Sales certifications for Woman of the World (The Best of 2007–2018)
Region	Certification	Certified units/sales
United Kingdom (BPI)	Silver	60,000^{‡}
^{^} Shipments figures based on certification alone.^{‡} Sales+streaming figures based on certification alone.

== Release history ==
Region	Date	Format	Label
Various	23 November 2018	CD; Digital download; streaming	Mercury
