= Love Love UK & European Arena Tour Live 2010 =

Live album by Amy Macdonald
- Released: 25 April 2011
- Recorded: 2010
- Genre: Pop
- Label: Concert Live

Amy Macdonald chronology
iTunes Festival: London 2010 (2010)	Love Love UK & European Arena Tour Live 2010 (2011)	Life in a Beautiful Light (2012)

Love Love UK & European Arena Tour Live 2010 is a live album by Scottish recording artist Amy Macdonald released on 25 April 2011 in the United Kingdom. The album peaked at No. 89 on the Swiss Albums Chart.

== Track listing ==
=== Disc 1 ===
1. "Ordinary Life"
2. "Poison Prince"
3. "Love Love"
4. "Mr Rock & Roll"
5. "Footballers Wife"
6. "Spark"
7. "L.A."
8. "Youth of Today"
9. "Pretty Face"
10. "Don't Tell Me That It's Over"

=== Disc 2 ===
1. "Troubled Soul"
2. "Give It All Up"
3. "Next Big Thing"
4. "No Roots"
5. "Run"
6. "This Is the Life"
7. "What Happiness Means to Me"

=== Disc 3 ===
1. "Born to Run"
2. "Let's Start a Band"

== Chart performance ==
Chart (2011)	Peak position
Swiss Albums Chart	89

== Release history ==
Region	Date	Format	Label
United Kingdom	25 April 2011	CD	Concert Live
