= Don't Tell Me That It's Over (EP) =

EP by Amy Macdonald
- Released: July 8, 2022
- Genre: Rock, pop, folk
- Length: 11:15
- Label: Infectious Music; BMG
- Producer: Thom Kirkpatrick

Amy Macdonald chronology
The Human Demands (2020)	Don't Tell Me That It's Over (2022)	Is This What You've Been Waiting For? (2025)

Don't Tell Me That It's Over is a 2022 extended play released by Scottish singer–songwriter Amy Macdonald, released on July 7, 2022, via BMG. It features a total of three re–recorded songs – "Don't Tell Me That It's Over", "Run" and "Slow It Down" – from Macdonald's studio albums A Curious Thing (2010), This is the Life (2007) and Life in a Beautiful Light (2012) respectively.

== Background ==
Macdonald re–recorded three new versions of previous her previous single releases – "Run" (2008), "Don't Tell Me That It's Over" (2010) and "Slow It Down" (2012), describing the songs as "fan favourites". Macdonald has claimed that the three songs have been re–recorded in the style of live performances and the way in which Macdonald performs each of the three songs whilst on tour. Speaking about the background and inspiration for the extended play, Macdonald claimed that "having played these songs live for years on the road, my band and I decided to reimagine the music a little bit, give them a new lease of life, and bring them into line musically with some of the tracks from my latest album. The result is a really exciting and modern vibe, and when we took them on the road and played them in front of an audience they got a great response, so we decided we wanted to put them down on record and share them with the world – hence this EP".

The songs were chosen on the basis of their popularity during Macdonald's live shows, and between each of the three songs, they have accumulated a total of 75 million streams on streaming platforms worldwide.

== Release and reception ==
The extended play was released on 7 July 2022 via Macdonald's record company BMG Rights Management (BMG Records). The extended play was released to promote Macdonald's busy touring schedule during the Summer period throughout 2022. Prior to its release, Macdonald played a sold out date at Glasgow's OVO Hydro before commencing on European dates which included arena and festival performances.

Upon the release of Don't Tell Me That It's Over, Macdonald's vocal ability was praised by music critics who had complimented Macdonald's mature vocal range. "'Don't Tell Me That It's Over' shows how much Amy's voice has matured since the original version was released in 2010, while the production, less intricate but far more raucous, allows its driving pop-rock melodies to take on a powerful new momentum" said Mark Millar in XS Noize. The re–recording of "Run" was similarly praised, claiming that she had "raised the dramatic intensity from the original's contrasting dynamics. 'Slow It Down' is perhaps the biggest reinvention of the set, now feeling like a blend between Amy's love of Springsteen's heartland rock and the sparkling synth undercurrent of The War on Drugs".

Upon the release of the extended play, Macdonald said that she was "so proud" to share the release ahead of her upcoming run of festival shows across Europe.

== Promotional dates ==
Macdonald toured Europe immediately following the release of Don't Tell Me That It's Over with shows in countries including Germany, Austria and her native Scotland. The list of dates in which Macdonald toured in support of its release are as noted below.

July 2022

- July 2022 – Na Fir Bolg 2022
- July 9, 2022 – Bospop 2022
- July 14, 2022 – Doune the Rabbit Hole Festival 2022
- July 16, 2022 – Campdalfest 2022
- July 23, 2022 – Stimmen Festival
- July 28, 2022 – Y Not Festival
- July 29, 2022 – Kendall Festival

August 2022

- August 12, 2022 – Northern Meeting Park
- August 17, 2022 – Freilichtbühne Großer Garten Junge Garde
- August 18, 2022 – Burg Nideggen
- August 26, 2022 – Victorious Festival 2022

== Track listing ==
The track list for Don't Tell Me That It's Over is as follows. All tracks were written by Macdonald, unless otherwise stated.

No.	Title	Length
1.	"Don't Tell Me That It's Over"	3:38
2.	"Run"	4:34
3.	"Slow It Down"	3:43
