= This Christmas Day (song) =

Single by Amy Macdonald
- Released: 1 December 2017
- Recorded: 2017
- Genre: Pop
- Length: 3:39
- Label: Mercury Records
- Songwriter(s): Amy Macdonald

Amy Macdonald singles chronology
"Down By the Water" (2017)	"This Christmas Day" (2017)	"Woman of the World" (2018)

"This Christmas Day" is a song by Scottish singer-songwriter Amy Macdonald. The song was released as a digital download on 1 December 2017 through Mercury Records with all proceeds going to Alzheimer's Research UK. The song has peaked at number 57 on the Scottish Singles Chart.

== Music video ==
A music video to accompany the release of "This Christmas Day" was first released onto YouTube on 1 December 2017 at a total length of three minutes and thirty-nine seconds. The video features home videos of Amy and her family during the festive period, the video also features Amy's nan Ellen, who died from Alzheimer's disease in 2001, aged 81.

== Track listing ==
Digital download
No.	Title	Length
1.	"This Christmas Day"	3:39

== Charts ==
Chart (2017)	Peak position
Scotland (OCC)	57

== Release history ==
Region	Date	Format	Label
United Kingdom	1 December 2017	Digital download	Mercury
