= The Hudson (song) =

2020 song by Amy Macdonald

Single by Amy Macdonald

from the album The Human Demands
- Released: 27 August 2020
- Recorded: February 2020 – August 2020
- Genre: Pop rock; soft rock
- Length: 4:59 (album version); 3:26 (edit)
- Label: Infectious Music; BMG
- Songwriters: Amy Macdonald; Matt Jones
- Producer: Jim Abbiss

Amy Macdonald singles chronology
"This Time's Everything" (2019)	"The Hudson" (2020)	"Crazy Shade of Blue" (2020)

"The Hudson" is a song by Scottish singer-songwriter Amy Macdonald. The song was released as a digital download on 27 August 2020 as the lead single from her fifth studio album The Human Demands. The song was written by Amy Macdonald, Matt Jones and produced by Jim Abbiss, and became her first top 20 appearance on the national singles charts in her native Scotland since "Slow It Down" in 2012.

== Background ==
In an interview with Wonderland, Macdonald talked about the stories her dad told her about New York in the 70s, "My dad has loads of stories and the stories of him and my mum travelling around the US when they were younger are amazing. He had been telling me about staying in a hotel in New York that had 3 bolts across the door. [...] It explores all the same themes of life and wondering if you’ve made the right decisions and taken the right path but it feels like it means so much more to me because of everything that has happened through these years."

Macdonald claimed that when it came to writing "The Hudson", she "had so many ideas and so many things to say that it happened really easily. I was sat at my dining room table with my friend Matt and he had played me a musical idea and the lyrics came to me without even thinking about it. It doesn’t always happen that easily but it’s a great feeling when it does". She has said that during writing processes, she spends a considerable amount of time engaging in daydreaming, saying "I also spend a lot of time daydreaming, I think it’s a fundamental part of my writing process. I always reminisce and think about how different my life might have been had I made different decisions, this is something we all do and I find it so interesting because we’ll never ever know the answers. We spend so much time thinking about what could have been and this felt like the perfect idea for a song".

Aside from the inspiration from her dads stories of New York during the 1970s, Macdonald claimed that "The Hudson" was also written about "my absolute love of New York City. It will always be an inspiring place".

== Release ==
=== Critical reception ===
"The Hudson" was released as the lead single from Macdonald's fifth studio album The Human Demands (2020) on 27 August 2020. The song has been described as "bringing that signature Amy Macdonald sound and flare that we all know and love the forefront however there’s maturity to it this time around that I don’t think we’ve seen before". The Scotsman said that "The Hudson" "hits a richer seam", claiming that "it’s a wistful look back at wilder days from the ambivalent perspective of a settled thirtysomething and mines some of Lana Del Rey’s nostalgic je ne sais quoi".

=== Commercial response ===
"The Hudson" saw Macdonald return to the Top 100 of the singles charts in her native Scotland since the release of her single "Slow It Down" in 2012. It peaked at number twelve on the official Scottish Singles Charts which was her highest position on the Scottish charts since "Slow It Down" reached number sixteen in 2012. In the United Kingdom, it failed to chart within the official UK Top 100 Singles Charts, however, it did reach number fifty five on the UK Singles Downloads Chart.

== Music video ==
A music video to accompany the release of "The Hudson" was first released onto YouTube on 17 September 2020. The video was directed by Rubber. Talking about the video, Macdonald said, "The Hudson is such a special song because of the back story, and I felt like it needed a striking video to really highlight the story. It feels cinematic and highlights the feelings of lost love and hindsight, looking back and wondering if life could have panned out differently – it’s something we all do and yet we'll never know the answer. Making this video in the midst of a pandemic was absolutely crazy. Having a team across the Atlantic working away in New York City whilst we sat at home was strange. I didn't know how we'd make it work or how my images would tie in with the images from NYC but I'm so pleased with the final outcome. I’ve always wanted to make a video that feels like a movie and I think I’m finally there. Enjoy!"

== Track listing ==
Digital download
No.	Title	Length
1.	"The Hudson" (Edit)	3:26

Album version
No.	Title	Length
1.	"The Hudson"	4:59

== Personnel ==
Credits adapted from Tidal.

- Jim Abbiss – producer
- Amy Macdonald – composer, writer
- Matt Jones – composer, writer, guitar, strings
- Harry Koisser – 12 string guitar
- Matt Park – acoustic guitar, mandolin
- Chris Hill – bass, piano, synthesizer
- Brad Webb – drums, percussion
- Alex Di Camillo – engineer
- Dick Beetham – engineer
- Edd Hartwell – engineer
- Giovanni Giagu – engineer
- Ruadhri Cushnan – engineer

== Charts ==
Chart (2020)	Peak position
Scotland Singles (OCC)	12
UK Singles Downloads (OCC)	55

== Release history ==
Region	Date	Format	Label
United Kingdom	27 August 2020	Digital download	Infectious Music; BMG
