= Dream On (Amy Macdonald song) =

Single by Amy Macdonald

from the album Under Stars
- Released: 6 January 2017
- Genre: Indie rock
- Length: 3:19
- Label: Mercury Records
- Songwriters: Amy Macdonald; Ben Parker; James Sims
- Producers: Mike Rowe; Andy Brittain

Amy Macdonald singles chronology
"Oh My Love" (2014)	"Dream On" (2017)	"Automatic" (2017)

Music videos
- "Dream On" on YouTube

"Dream On" is a song by Scottish recording artist Amy Macdonald, released as a digital download on 6 January 2017 through Mercury Records as the lead single from her fourth studio album, Under Stars (2017). Written by Macdonald, Ben Parker and James Sims, it was produced by Mike Rowe and Andy Brittain, and peaked at number 28 on the Scottish Singles Chart. Additionally, it achieved moderate commercial success across Europe, notably Belgium and Switzerland.

== Background ==
Macdonald began writing songs for her fourth studio album in early 2014, two years after the release of Life in a Beautiful Light. In May 2014, she performed four new songs live. She also sang "Leap of Faith" during the Scottish independence referendum in September 2014. In March 2015, Macdonald announced via Twitter she was finishing the songwriting of the album, but had not yet started recording. On 28 October 2015, she announced via Twitter she started the recording sessions for the album.

When released, Macdonald claimed that she was unaware what the song "would lead to", paying tribute to its considerable success in European music markets, as well as its inclusion in the Disney movie Patrick, a 2018 film which follows a young woman named Sarah as her whole life changed when her grandmother bequeaths her prized possession, a spoilt Pug named Patrick. Macdonald later provided recordings for the entire Patrick soundtrack. After signing the initial contract with Virgin EMI, Macdonald's manager Chris Kiely, claimed that both he and Macdonald began "quite the journey". In an interview with Music Weekly, he said "we came up with the idea of Amy providing the whole soundtrack. Director Mandie Fletcher was a big fan of Amy’s, the film carried a message of female empowerment that suited Amy and she’s a dog lover, so it all made sense".

The song was "met with immediate approval" by film producers, claiming "Amy and I were really happy with how it all came together. The meeting of minds from the worlds of film and music was a perfect combination".

== Release and performance ==
"Dream On" was released on 6 January 2017 as the lead single from Macdonald's four studio album Under Stars. Released via Mercury Records, it performed strongly in a number of European music markets. In her native Scotland, it debuted at number 28 on the Scottish Singles Charts. That same week, her 2007 single "This Is the Life" made a re–appearance on the Scottish Singles Charts. In Switzerland, it peaked at number 32 and spent a total of four weeks within the Top 100 of the Swiss charts.

Whilst it did not chart within the official UK Singles Charts Top 100, it did peak at number 62 on the UK Singles Downloads Chart. Similarly, in Belgium, it did not chart within either the official Ultratop Flanders or Wallonia charts, but did peak at number 34 on the Ultratip Bubbling Under Flanders and number 12 on the Ultratip Bubbling Under Wallonia charts.

== Reception ==
Released as Macdonald's first official single in five years, "Dream On" received positive reviews from critics. A Bit of Pop Music claimed that many may have "expected a departure" from her previous single, but highlighted that this was "not the case" with "Dream On". It later commented "Amy sticks to what she knows best: upbeat pop/rock with characteristic vocals, soaring melodies and uplifting lyrics. She keeps reassuring herself in the chorus: "I’m on top of the world and I’m on the right track, I’m on top of the world and I won’t look back." ‘Dream On’ is definitely a comeback in style, but at the same time I don’t see this gather much attention after such a long break from releasing music".

The Scotsman said that "Dream On" "was typical of her upbeat, optimistic rootsy Scotpop style". It was described by Pop Magazine as a "howl-at-the-moon, feel-good anthem about personal journey and triumph in the face of adversity".

== Music video ==
A music video to accompany the release of "Dream On" was first released onto YouTube on 13 January 2017 at a total length of three minutes and twenty-three seconds.

== Track listing ==
Digital download
No.	Title	Length
1.	"Dream On"	3:19

== Charts ==
Chart (2017)	Peak position
Belgium (Ultratip Bubbling Under Flanders)	34
Belgium (Ultratip Bubbling Under Wallonia)	12
Poland Airplay (ZPAV)	58
Scottish Singles Sales (Official Charts)	28
Switzerland (Schweizer Hitparade)	32
UK Singles Downloads (Official Charts)	62

== Release history ==
Region	Date	Format	Label
United Kingdom	6 January 2017	Digital download	Mercury Records
