= The Human Demands =

Studio album by Amy Macdonald
- Released: 30 October 2020
- Recorded: February – August 2020
- Genre: Pop rock; soft rock
- Length: 38:59
- Label: Infectious Music; BMG
- Producer: Jim Abbiss

Amy Macdonald chronology
Woman of the World (The Best of 2007–2018) (2018)	The Human Demands (2020)	Don't Tell Me That It's Over (2022)

Amy Macdonald studio album chronology
Under Stars (2017)	The Human Demands (2020)	Is This What You've Been Waiting For? (2025)

Singles from The Human Demands
- 1. "The Hudson" Released: 27 August 2020; 2. "Crazy Shade of Blue" Released: 25 September 2020; 3. "Fire" Released: 4 December 2020; 4. "Statues" Released: 19 February 2021; 5. "Bridges (promotional)" Released: 14 May 2021

The Human Demands is the fifth studio album by Scottish singer-songwriter Amy Macdonald, and was released on 30 October 2020. Produced by Jim Abbiss, the album spawned the singles "The Hudson", "Crazy Shade of Blue", "Fire" and "Statues". To promote the album, she embarked on The Human Demands Tour, with dates across Europe. Originally scheduled to begin in 2020, the tour was rescheduled as a result of the COVID-19 pandemic; it began on 21 October 2021 in Reading, England.

A commercial success, it debuted at number two in her native Scotland and in Switzerland, and within the top ten of the albums charts in Austria, Germany and the United Kingdom. In 2021, she represented Scotland at the Free European Song Contest 2021 in Germany with the albums fourth single, "Statues".

== Background ==
In an interview with Wonderland, Macdonald said, "It's an album about life and the ups and downs that come with it. It's never easy for anyone and I don't think we give ourselves enough credit sometimes. We're just expected to constantly be going 100mph all the time and that can be demanding for anyone. I wanted the album title to reflect the reality of life for the majority of people. [...] Myself, my producer Jim and all the wonderful musicians were just excited to be making music again. We felt genuinely lucky to be in the position that we could have a bit of normality back in our lives." After the release of the album, Macdonald said on her Instagram account, "I hope this album can be a comfort in these turbulent times. I am extremely proud of it. It feels like a special record coming out at an important time. Thank you so much for all your support over the past 15 years. I wouldn't be anything without you."

== Lyrical composition ==
Macdonald claimed that when it came to writing "The Hudson", she "had so many ideas and so many things to say that it happened really easily. I was sat at my dining room table with my friend Matt and he had played me a musical idea and the lyrics came to me without even thinking about it. It doesn't always happen that easily but it's a great feeling when it does". She has said that during writing processes, she spends a considerable amount of time engaging in daydreaming, saying "I also spend a lot of time daydreaming, I think it's a fundamental part of my writing process. I always reminisce and think about how different my life might have been had I made different decisions, this is something we all do and I find it so interesting because we'll never ever know the answers. We spend so much time thinking about what could have been and this felt like the perfect idea for a song". Aside from the inspiration from her dads stories of New York during the 1970s, Macdonald claimed that "The Hudson" was also written about "my absolute love of New York City. It will always be an inspiring place".

Macdonald wrote "Fire" as the first song following her marriage to footballer Richard Foster in Las Vegas. Macdonald said of the song "I was co-writing with a friend Matt Jones, and we had the song finished in half an hour. I was so happy at the time, just married, that I came up with something that isn't typical of me at all. I said to my husband: this is the only song you'll ever get out of me, so enjoy it". The song has been described by Gabby Smith in House of Solo Magazine as displaying a "softer side" to Macdonald and her songwriting, claiming "melted by marriage, the track is a heartfelt homage to her husband and remains one of the most romantic pieces ever written by the acoustic guitar-playing indie rocker. Displaying her impressive vocals and impeccable talents, staccato guitar riffs elevate the love song for a pleasant pop-rock feel". During a release party stream on her official YouTube channel, Macdonald said of the song "Fire is about those special relationships we have in our lives. The people who make us tick and we can fully be ourselves when we're around them. What would life be without them?".

Regarding the inspiration and writing process for "Statues", the song is a homage to the house and street in which Macdonald lived and grew up living in her home city Glasgow in Scotland. The composition of the song has been compared to "a Springsteen-esque skill for depicting snapshots of ordinary life with a poetic slant". Whilst interviewed about the song, Macdonald said "I look back and think of the times I spent in that house with my family and our dog Jackson and I smile,” she says. “My parents moved out of that house a few years ago and it was sad for us all, but especially them. But we'll always have those memories. I’ve had so many people say that they love this song because of the imagery it creates. I think it's because we all have those memories of the places we grew up in".

== Promotion ==
=== Singles ===
"The Hudson" was released as the lead single from the album on 27 August 2020. The song peaked at number 12 on the Scottish Singles Chart. "The Hudson" saw Macdonald return to the Top 100 of the singles charts in her native Scotland since the release of her single "Slow It Down" in 2012. It peaked at number twelve on the official Scottish Singles Charts which was her highest position on the Scottish charts since "Slow It Down" reached number sixteen in 2012. In the United Kingdom, it failed to chart within the official UK Top 100 Singles Charts, however, it did reach number fifty five on the UK Singles Downloads Chart.

"Crazy Shade of Blue" was released as the second single off the album on 25 September 2020. It has been described as "infused with a serenity that contrasts the energy of ‘The Hudson’, it finds Amy exploring another universal human experience". The composition of "Crazy Shade of Blue" is said to be "the dark undercurrent of new-found love. It's about having the bravery to share the insecurities and vulnerabilities that are needed to allow the relationship to flourish".

The title track, "The Human Demands", was released as a promotional single on 27 October 2020. "Fire" was released as the third single off the album on 4 December 2020. "Statues" was released as the fourth single from the album on 19 February 2021, and was selected to represent Scotland at the Free European Song Contest 2021, finishing in fourth place with 77 points.

=== Tour ===
On 7 September 2020, Macdonald announced her UK and Europe tour on her social media profiles. The tour had to be rescheduled due to the COVID-19 pandemic.

Tour dates to promote The Human Demands
UK and Europe Tour
Date	City	Country	Venue
21 October 2021	Reading	England	The Hexagon
22 October 2021	Manchester	England	Bridgewater Hall
23 October 2021	Stockton-on-Tees	England	Globe Theatre
25 October 2021	Ipswich	England	Regent Theatre
26 October 2021	London	England	Roundhouse
17 December 2021	Glasgow	Scotland	OVO Hydro
1 March 2022	Frankfurt	Germany	Jahrhunderthalle
2 March 2022	Hamburg	Germany	Barclaycard Arena
4 March 2022	Esch-sur-Alzette	Luxembourg	Rockhal
6 March 2022	Brussels	Belgium	Ancienne Belgique
7 March 2022	Tilburg	Netherlands	013
9 March 2022	Munich	Germany	Zenith
10 March 2022	Zürich	Switzerland	Samsung Hall
11 March 2022	Vienna	Austria	Gasometer
13 March 2022	Berlin	Germany	Max-Schmeling-Halle
14 March 2022	Oberhausen	Germany	König Pilsener Arena

== Track listing ==
Credits adapted from Tidal.

No.	Title	Writer(s)	Producer(s)	Length
1.	"Fire"	Amy Macdonald; Matt Jones	Jim Abbiss	4:15
2.	"Statues"	Macdonald; Thom Kirkpatrick	Abbiss	3:46
3.	"Crazy Shade of Blue"	Macdonald; Jones	Abbiss	4:13
4.	"The Hudson"	Macdonald; Jones	Abbiss	5:00
5.	"The Human Demands"	Macdonald; Jones	Abbiss	3:53
6.	"We Could Be So Much More"	Macdonald; Jones	Abbiss	3:57
7.	"Young Fire, Old Flame"	Macdonald; James Sims	Abbiss	3:44
8.	"Bridges"	Macdonald; Jones	Abbiss	3:59
9.	"Strong Again"	Macdonald; Kirkpatrick	Abbiss	4:08
10.	"Something in Nothing"	Macdonald; Gordon Turner	Abbiss	3:39

Deluxe edition
No.	Title	Length
11.	"Bridges" (Acoustic)
12.	"The Hudson" (Acoustic)
13.	"Fire" (Acoustic)
14.	"Statues" (Acoustic)
15.	"We Could Be So Much More" (Acoustic)
16.	"The Human Demands" (Acoustic)

== Personnel ==
Credits adapted from Tidal.

- Eddd Hartwell – Engineer
- Ruadhri Cushnab – Engineer
- Barry Barnicott – Engineer
- Alex Di Camillo – Engineer
- Dick Beetham – Engineer
- Giovanni Giagu – Engineer

== Charts ==
=== Weekly charts ===
Weekly chart performance for The Human Demands
Chart (2020)	Peak position
Austrian Albums (Ö3 Austria)	7
Belgian Albums (Ultratop Flanders)	44
Belgian Albums (Ultratop Wallonia)	47
Dutch Albums (Album Top 100)	42
German Albums (Offizielle Top 100)	4
Scottish Albums (OCC)	2
Swiss Albums (Schweizer Hitparade)	2
UK Albums (OCC)	10
UK Independent Albums (OCC)	1

=== Year-end charts ===
Year-end chart performance for The Human Demands
Chart (2020)	Position
Swiss Albums (Schweizer Hitparade)	58

== Release history ==
Region	Date	Format	Label
Various	30 October 2020	CD; Digital download; streaming	Infectious
