= Your Time Will Come =

Single by Amy Macdonald

from the album A Curious Thing
- Released: 17 December 2010
- Recorded: 2009
- Genre: Rock
- Length: 4:32
- Label: Mercury Records
- Songwriter: Amy Macdonald
- Producer: Pete Wilkinson

Amy Macdonald singles chronology
"Love Love" (2010)	"Your Time Will Come" (2010)	"Slow It Down" (2012)

Music video
- "Your Time Will Come" on YouTube

"Your Time Will Come" is a 2010 single release by Scottish recording artist Amy Macdonald, released as the fifth single from her second studio album A Curious Thing (2010). It was the first time one of her singles had failed to chart anywhere in Europe.

== Track listing ==
Digital download (iTunes EP):

1. "Your Time Will Come" – 4:32'
2. "Your Time Will Come (live with the Deutsche Radio Philharmonie Orchestra)" – 3:38'
3. "Your Time Will Come (Video)" – 3:48'

== See also ==
- A Curious Thing
- Amy Macdonald
