= Love Love (Amy Macdonald song) =

Single by Amy Macdonald

from the album A Curious Thing
- Released: 4 October 2010
- Recorded: 2009
- Genre: Rock
- Length: 3:17 (album version)
- Label: Mercury Records
- Songwriter(s): Amy Macdonald
- Producer(s): Pete Wilkinson

Amy Macdonald singles chronology
"This Pretty Face" (2010)	"Love Love" (2010)	"Your Time Will Come" (2010)

Music video
- "Love Love" on YouTube

"Love Love" is a 2010 single release by Scottish recording artist Amy Macdonald, released as the fourth single from her second studio album, A Curious Thing (2010).

== Background ==
Macdonald's single comes as part of an EP recorded live at Metropolis Studios. She recorded four tracks for 'On track...with SEAT' earlier in 2010 including her single "Love Love", the hit "This Is the Life", "Don't Tell Me That It's Over" and her cover of Bruce Springsteen's "Dancing in the Dark". The music video was released on 23 September 2010.

== Track listing ==
Digital download (Metropolis 'On Track' Session EP)

1. "Love Love" (Metropolis 'On Track Session) – 3:09
2. "This Is the Life" (Metropolis 'On Track Session) – 3:20
3. "Dancing in the Dark" (Metropolis 'On Track Session) – 3:10
4. "Don't Tell Me That It's Over" (Metropolis 'On Track Session) – 3:16

Promo CD single

1. "Love Love" – 3:17

== Chart performance ==
Chart (2010)	Peak position
Belgium (Ultratip Bubbling Under Flanders)	7
Belgium (Ultratip Bubbling Under Wallonia)	3
UK Singles (The Official Charts Company)	183
