= This Pretty Face =

Single by Amy Macdonald

from the album A Curious Thing
- Released: 19 July 2010
- Recorded: 2009
- Genre: Rock
- Length: 3:57
- Label: Mercury Records
- Songwriter(s): Amy Macdonald
- Producer(s): Pete Wilkinson

Amy Macdonald singles chronology
"Spark" (2010)	"This Pretty Face" (2010)	"Love Love" (2010)

Music video
- "This Pretty Face" on YouTube

"This Pretty Face" is a 2010 single released by Scottish singer Amy Macdonald, released as the third single from her second studio album, A Curious Thing (2010). The single was released on 19 July 2010.

== Background ==
Although MacDonald has not confirmed an official story behind the writing of the song, it is said to believe that "This Pretty Face" is about modern day 'celebrities' who become famous, mainly only because of their looks (Kim Kardashian being an example). The music video, which debuted on MacDonald's YouTube channel in June, 2010 also sets this kind of story.

== Music video ==
The music video for the song appeared on MacDonald's YouTube channel in June 2010. The video begins with MacDonald in a superstore, which is named Super-mac's. MacDonald has a trolley, and is doing her shopping. MacDonald also looks at a magazine, and the celebrity who appears on the front cover of the magazine appears in the store with her pet poodle dog. The Paparazzi come, and start taking photos of the celebrity. However, towards the end of the video, another star with a beautiful face enters the store, and the Paparazzi lose interest in the celebrity they had first started taking photos of. They then focus their attention entirely on the other woman, and the celebrity who had the attention to start with is begging for them to come back, while MacDonald still walks around the store. It is setting an example that the woman then becomes a normal person as all media has lost interest in her now that they have found someone else with an even more "Pretty Face".

== Track listing ==
UK CD single

1. "This Pretty Face" – 3:57
2. "Give It All Up" (acoustic, W14 session) – 2:40
3. "Born to Run" (live) – 3:45
4. "Spark" (Tiesto remix) – 7:09

Digital download (iTunes EP)

1. "This Pretty Face" – 3:57
2. "Give It All Up" (acoustic, W14 session) – 2:40
3. "Born to Run" (live) – 3:45
4. "Spark" (Tiesto remix) – 7:09
5. "Spark" (DiscoTech remix) – 4:40

== Chart performance ==
Chart (2010–11)	Peak position
Austria (Ö3 Austria Top 40)	56
Belgium (Ultratip Bubbling Under Flanders)	14
Belgium (Ultratip Bubbling Under Wallonia)	18
Germany (GfK)	49
UK Singles (The Official Charts Company)	138
