= 4th of July (Amy Macdonald song) =

Single by Amy Macdonald

from the album Life in a Beautiful Light
- Released: 22 October 2012
- Recorded: 2011
- Genre: Pop, folk
- Length: 3:48
- Label: Mercury Records
- Songwriter: Amy Macdonald
- Producer: Pete Wilkinson

Amy Macdonald singles chronology
"Pride" (2012)	"4th of July" (2012)	"Oh My Love" (2014)

Music videos
- "4th of July" on YouTube

"4th of July" is a single release by Scottish recording artist Amy Macdonald. It was released as the third single from her third studio album, Life in a Beautiful Light, on 22 October 2012. The song was written by Amy Macdonald and produced by Pete Wilkinson.

== Background ==
The song was inspired by a childhood trip to New York with her family on Independence Day. On 2 October 2012 Macdonald announced that she was filming the video saying, "Early start today. Filming the video for '4th of July'". On 17 October 2012 she wrote, "The video for 4th of July is nearly finished and ready to go! I am really happy with it! Excited for you all to see it!". On 18 October 2012 Mercury Music Group announced the release date of the single, "@Amy__Macdonald single for ‘4th Of July’ is out next week! Video coming soon.." The music video was uploaded to YouTube on 24 October 2012 at a total length of four minutes.

== Promotion ==
On 26 October 2012, Macdonald performed the song live on This Morning. On the Under Stars tour, Macdonald performed an acoustic version of the song with a very different arrangement.

== Track listing ==
Digital download
No.	Title	Lyrics	Producer	Length
1.	"4th of July"	Amy Macdonald	Pete Wilkinson	3:48

== Release history ==
Region	Date	Format	Label
United Kingdom	22 October 2012	Digital download	Mercury Records
