= Spark (Amy Macdonald song) =

Single by Amy Macdonald

from the album A Curious Thing
- Released: 10 May 2010
- Recorded: 2009
- Genre: Rock
- Length: 3:07
- Label: Mercury Records
- Songwriter(s): Amy Macdonald
- Producer(s): Pete Wilkinson

Amy Macdonald singles chronology
"Don't Tell Me That It's Over" (2010)	"Spark" (2010)	"This Pretty Face" (2010)

Music video
- "Spark" on YouTube

"Spark" is a single released by Scottish singer Amy Macdonald as the second single from her second studio album A Curious Thing (2010) and was released in the UK on 10 May 2010. The song achieved considerable commercial success in Europe, particularly on the continent in countries including Austria, Belgium, Germany and Switzerland. It became the first single released by Macdonald not to chart on the official singles charts in the United Kingdom.

== Background ==
Macdonald began writing songs for her second album in spring 2009, in a brief break from her touring commitments. For the first time she began poring through her old notebooks, looking at song ideas, unlike her debut which consists mainly of songs that she wrote straight away. Many of the tracks were inspired by real-life personalities or events from her daily life. "An Ordinary Life" is inspired by the "Z-list celebs" she saw flocking around Scots-born Hollywood actor Gerard Butler at a party he held in Glasgow late 2009 to mark the opening of his film Law Abiding Citizen. The tracks were recorded at Weller's BlackBarn Studios in Surrey.

== Music video ==
The music video was filmed at Loch Lomond in Scotland. It starts with Macdonald walking down a slipway towards the Loch carrying a case she puts it down and starts playing the guitar with a caravan in the background, orange lines flash throughout the music video and the viewer can see different shots of the loch, the forest and Macdonald playing her guitar.

== Track listing ==
Digital download

1. "Spark" – 3:07
2. "Spark" (Acoustic Version – German Radio Tour) – 3:05

iTunes digital download

1. "Spark" – 3:07
2. "Your Time Will Come" (Farewell Olympic Studios Version) – 3:48
3. "Spark" (Tom Middleton Mix) – 8:22
4. "Don't Tell Me That It's Over" (Acoustic Version – German Radio Tour) – 3:07

German single-CD

1. "Spark" – 3:07
2. "Spark" (HR1 Acoustic Version) – 3:05
3. "Spark" (Tom Middleton Mix) – 8:22
4. "Don't Tell Me That It's Over" (HR1 Acoustic Version) – 3:07

== Charts ==
=== Weekly charts ===
Chart (2010)	Peak position
Austria (Ö3 Austria Top 40)	74
Belgium (Ultratop 50 Flanders)	15
Belgium (Ultratop 50 Wallonia)	11
Germany (GfK)	56
Switzerland (Schweizer Hitparade)	30

== Release history ==
Region	Date	Format	Label
United Kingdom	10 May 2010	Digital download, CD single	Mercury Records
Germany	25 June 2010	Digital download, CD single	Mercury Records
