= A Curious Thing =

Studio album by Amy Macdonald
- Released: 8 March 2010
- Studio: Weller's BlackBarn Studios (Surrey, England)
- Genre: Pop rock, soft rock
- Length: 50:19
- Label: Melodramatic, Mercury
- Producer: Pete Wilkinson

Amy Macdonald chronology
| Live from Glasgow (2007) | A Curious Thing (2010) | iTunes Festival: London 2010 (2010) |

Amy Macdonald studio album chronology
| This Is the Life (2007) | A Curious Thing (2010) | Life in a Beautiful Light (2012) |

Singles from A Curious Thing
- 1. "Don't Tell Me That It's Over" Released: 1 March 2010; 2. "Spark" Released: 10 May 2010; 3. "This Pretty Face" Released: 19 July 2010; 4. "Love Love" Released: 4 October 2010; 5. "Your Time Will Come" Released: 17 December 2010

A Curious Thing is the second album by Scottish singer-songwriter Amy Macdonald, released on 8 March 2010. The album was confirmed for release in late 2009, and the album's title and track listing was confirmed in January 2010. As of July 2026, the album has sold in excess of one million copies worldwide, and received Platinum certifications in Austria, Belgium and the United Kingdom, whilst in Germany and Switzerland it has been awarded 2x Platinum certifications.

The albums release was supported by the lead single, "Don't Tell Me That It's Over", which was released on 1 March 2010, followed by the release of a second single "Spark" on 10 May 2010. Three further singles were released, – "This Pretty Face", "Love Love" and "Your Time Will Come" with varying degrees of commercial success. The album was named Best Album at the 2010 Tartan Clef Awards, and received the award for Best International Album Rock/Pop at the Swiss Music Awards the same year.

== Background ==
Macdonald began writing songs for her second album in spring 2009, in a brief break from her touring commitments. For the first time she began poring through her old notebooks, looking at song ideas, unlike her debut which consists mainly of songs that she wrote straight away. Many of the tracks were inspired by real-life personalities or events from her everyday life. Contrary to some reports, she did not write "Spark" for murdered toddler James Bulger after watching a TV programme on his murder.

The song "What Happiness Means to Me" is dedicated to her footballer fiancé Steve Lovell, while "An Ordinary Life" is inspired by the "Z-list celebs" she saw flocking around Scots-born Hollywood actor Gerard Butler at a party he held in Glasgow late 2009 to mark the opening of his film Law Abiding Citizen. "My Only One" is partly about her late grandparents and partly about Michael Jackson. The tracks were recorded at Weller's BlackBarn Studios in Surrey.

== Release ==
A Curious Thing was released in the United Kingdom on Monday 8 March 2010. "Don't Tell Me That It's Over" is the lead single from the album, released on 26 February 2010 in Germany and 1 March 2010 in the UK. Although it only managed to peak at number 48 in the UK, it made the top 10 in Belgium, Germany, Switzerland and Austria. "Spark" is the second single from the album. Macdonald said at a gig she filmed the video on 23 March in Loch Lomond. The official Amy Macdonald website revealed that "Spark" would be released on 10 May 2010, with the video released prior to this date. "This Pretty Face" is the third single from the album, released on 19 July 2010. The music video for the song was filmed and became available to view through Macdonald's official website and YouTube channel.

"Love Love" is the fourth single from the album. It was released as a digital download EP on 4 October 2010. The music video was released on 23 September 2010. "Your Time Will Come" is the fifth single from the album, which was released on 17 December 2010. The music video for the song was released through Macdonald's official website.

== Reception ==
Professional ratings
Review scores
| Source | Rating |
|---|---|
| AllMusic | 3/5 stars |
| BBC Music | (favourable) |
| The Daily Telegraph | 3/5 stars |
| Daily Express | 3/5 stars |
| The Guardian | 3/5 stars |
| MusicOMH | 3.5/5 stars |
| NME | (5/10) |
| Sputnikmusic | 4/5 stars |
| The Press | 3/5 stars |
| The Times | 3/5 stars |

The album garnered mixed reviews. At aggregator website AnyDecentMusic? the album scored 5.4/10. Paul Lester of BBC Music gave the album a positive review, calling it "a triumphant return" and went on to add that "it is a bold, grand statement of intent, full of songs of epic sweep that build to undeniable choruses, to be enjoyed by the largest possible audiences". He also praised Macdonald's vocal performance comparing it to the likes of Dolores O'Riordan and Sinéad O'Connor. MusicOMH's Jenni Cole complimented Macdonald's songwriting ability, stating that her lyrics "display a maturity way beyond her years, which she marries to a wistfulness the most hardened bluesman would envy". She continued by saying that "her songwriting (in both style and substance) recalls the early days of Kirsty MacColl, while her deeper vocals have more in common with Alison Moyet. It's a match made in heaven."

Ian Sime of The Press noticed that the record "is very similar in feel and approach to its predecessor and should appeal to those who enjoyed This Is The Life" and that it has "an earthy rock edge comparable to Travis, Keane and The Killers." Simon Gage from Daily Express hailed the album's lead single "Don't Tell Me That It's Over", saying that it "sets a furious pace with guitars and drums that frame her strong, slightly Irish-sounding voice" and concluded by stating that "the rest of the album follows suit with songs that stand up on their own, even without Amy's obvious talent as a singer."

Caroline Sullivan and Neil McCormick of The Guardian and The Daily Telegraph respectively, both gave the album favourable reviews, however they agreed that it doesn't really manage to stand out. Sullivan spotted that the "heartfelt, songwriterly tunes ... burrow into your consciousness but somehow fail to register on a deeper level" and McCormick felt that it is lacking "anything truly distinctive or original to lift her above the massed ranks of young singer-songwriters." The Times's Kaya Burgess did not share the other reviewers' excitement about the lyrics, saying that they "don't quite match the striking power of Macdonald's vocals", however he observed that "when the melodrama and crashing drums fade away on the piano-led What Happiness Means to Me we glimpse the soul behind the big voice."

Noel Gardner of the NME gave the album a mixed review, saying that it is "predictable" and too "Scottish", in the sense that its "folkish Ford Mondeo pop upholds the nation’s legacy of pleasantly anthemic drivetime belters." Fiona Shepherd of The Scotsman gave the album a negative review, stating that the artist "seems to take a step backwards on her second album with an anachronistic 1980s sound and predictable lyrics about the pressures of fame (An Ordinary Life), the perils of hype (Next Big Thing) and the culture of image-over-talent (This Pretty Face)."

== Track listings ==
All tracks were written by Amy Macdonald except where there are corresponding clarifications in brackets.

=== Standard edition ===
| No. | Title | Length |
|---|---|---|
| 1. | "Don't Tell Me That It's Over" | 3:15 |
| 2. | "Spark" | 3:07 |
| 3. | "No Roots" | 4:30 |
| 4. | "Love Love" | 3:17 |
| 5. | "An Ordinary Life" | 3:36 |
| 6. | "Give It All Up" | 2:55 |
| 7. | "My Only One" | 3:32 |
| 8. | "This Pretty Face" | 3:57 |
| 9. | "Troubled Soul" | 4:47 |
| 10. | "Next Big Thing" | 3:31 |
| 11. | "Your Time Will Come" | 4:32 |
| 12. | "What Happiness Means to Me / Dancing in the Dark" (hidden track) | 9:21 |
| Total length: | | 50:19 |

=== Deluxe edition ===
The deluxe two-disc set includes the standard version of the album and the full live recording from Amy's homecoming show at Glasgow Barrowlands in December 2007.

CD 2
| No. | Title | Length |
|---|---|---|
| 1. | "Poison Prince" | 3:40 |
| 2. | "Youth of Today" | 4:03 |
| 3. | "L.A." | 3:47 |
| 4. | "Footballer's Wife" | 5:12 |
| 5. | "Mr Rock & Roll" | 3:37 |
| 6. | "Mr Brightside" (written by The Killers) | 4:12 |
| 7. | "The Road to Home" | 2:27 |
| 8. | "This Is the Life" | 3:14 |
| 9. | "Run" | 3:48 |
| 10. | "Rock 'n' Roll Star" | 5:07 |
| 11. | "Let's Start a Band" | 5:31 |
| 12. | "Caledonia" | 2:32 |
| 13. | "Fairytale of New York" | 5:48 |
| 14. | "Barrowland Ballroom" | 4:40 |

=== Special orchestral edition ===
The special orchestral two-disc set includes the standard version of the album and plus a bonus disc containing live orchestral versions recorded on 17 October 2010. It was recorded live for Universal Music and SR1 in Esch-sur-Alzette (Luxembourg), performed with the Deutsche Radio Philharmonie Orchestra, conducted by Gast Waltzing.

CD 2
| No. | Title | Length |
|---|---|---|
| 1. | "An Ordinary Life" (live philharmonic orchestral version) | 4:50 |
| 2. | "Spark" (live philharmonic orchestral version) | 4:04 |
| 3. | "Footballer's Wife" (live philharmonic orchestral version) | 5:02 |
| 4. | "Mr. Rock & Roll" (live philharmonic orchestral version) | 4:27 |
| 5. | "Your Time Will Come" (live philharmonic orchestral version) | 5:34 |
| 6. | "Youth of Today" (live philharmonic orchestral version) | 4:23 |
| 7. | "This Pretty Face" (live philharmonic orchestral version) | 4:35 |
| 8. | "Don't Tell Me That It's Over" (live philharmonic orchestral version) | 4:38 |
| 9. | "No Roots" (live philharmonic orchestral version) | 5:48 |
| 10. | "This Is the Life" (live philharmonic orchestral version) | 4:46 |
| 11. | "What Happiness Means to Me" (live philharmonic orchestral version) | 5:44 |
| 12. | "Let's Start a Band" (live philharmonic orchestral version) | 5:20 |

== Personnel ==
- Mixing – Danton Supple
- Producer, arranging – Pete Wilkinson
- Writing, vocals, guitar – Amy Macdonald

== Charts and certifications ==
The album entered the UK Albums Chart on 14 March 2010 at number 4. It entered the Swiss Albums Chart at number 1 on 21 March 2010, making it her second album to get to number 1 in Switzerland. It also peaked at number 1 in Germany and Austria. The album has sold 1,000,000 copies. Spending 65 weeks on the German Albums Chart, A Curious Thing is MacDonald's second album to stay on that chart for more than a year (her debut album spent 101 weeks on that chart, with 36 weeks in the top 10).

=== Weekly charts ===
| Chart (2010) | Peak position |
|---|---|
| Austrian Albums (Ö3 Austria) | 1 |
| Belgian Albums (Ultratop Flanders) | 2 |
| Belgian Albums (Ultratop Wallonia) | 4 |
| Danish Albums (Hitlisten) | 7 |
| Dutch Albums (Album Top 100) | 2 |
| Finnish Albums (Suomen virallinen lista) | 18 |
| French Albums (SNEP) | 16 |
| German Albums (Offizielle Top 100) | 1 |
| Greek Albums (IFPI) | 2 |
| Irish Albums (IRMA) | 26 |
| Italian Albums (FIMI) | 25 |
| Norwegian Albums (VG-lista) | 22 |
| Portuguese Albums (AFP) | 24 |
| Scottish Albums (Official Charts) | 2 |
| Spanish Albums (Promusicae) | 13 |
| Swedish Albums (Sverigetopplistan) | 5 |
| Swiss Albums (Schweizer Hitparade) | 1 |
| UK Albums (Official Charts) | 4 |

=== Year-end charts ===
| Chart (2010) | Position |
|---|---|
| Austrian Albums (Ö3 Austria) | 15 |
| Belgian Albums (Ultratop Flanders) | 13 |
| Belgian Albums (Ultratop Wallonia) | 26 |
| Dutch Albums (Album Top 100) | 31 |
| French Albums (SNEP) | 153 |
| German Albums (Offizielle Top 100) | 6 |
| Swiss Albums (Schweizer Hitparade) | 2 |
| UK Albums (OCC) | 61 |

| Chart (2011) | Position |
|---|---|
| German Albums (Offizielle Top 100) | 80 |

=== Certifications ===
| Region | Certification | Certified units/sales |
|---|---|---|
| Austria (IFPI Austria) | Platinum | 20,000^{*} |
| Belgium (BRMA) | Platinum | 30,000^{*} |
| France | — | 25,000 |
| Germany (BVMI) | 2× Platinum | 400,000^{^} |
| Switzerland (IFPI Switzerland) | 2× Platinum | 60,000^{^} |
| United Kingdom (BPI) | Platinum | 300,000^{‡} |
Summaries
| Europe (IFPI) | Platinum | 1,000,000^{*} |
^{*} Sales figures based on certification alone.^{^} Shipments figures based on certification alone.^{‡} Sales+streaming figures based on certification alone.
