= Patrick (2018 film) =

- British Theatrical Release Poster
- Directed by: Mandie Fletcher
- Written by: Mandie Fletcher; Vanessa Davies; Paul de Vos
- Starring: Beattie Edmondson; Ed Skrein; Tom Bennett; Emily Atack; Jennifer Saunders; Adrian Scarborough
- Cinematography: Chris Goodger
- Music by: Michael Price; Amy Macdonald
- Production companies: A Fearless Pen; Courtland; ARG; Fred Films
- Distributed by: Buena Vista International
- Release date: 29 June 2018
- Running time: 94 minutes
- Country: United Kingdom
- Language: English
- Budget: £6 million
- Box office: $3 million

Patrick is a 2018 British family comedy film directed by Mandie Fletcher, who co-wrote the film with Vanessa Davies and Paul de Vos, and distributed by Buena Vista International.

== Plot ==
A young woman named Sarah has her whole life changed when her grandmother bequeaths her prized possession, a spoiled Pug named Patrick. Sarah has recently moved into a new apartment with a no-pet policy and just got employed teaching Year 11 English. She struggles to deal with both Patrick and discipline in her school. After a few incidents with Patrick, she finally connects with the students and really starts to connect with Patrick.

Patrick helps her to meet two potential love interests – one is a narcissistic vet named Oliver and the other is a student's father, Ben. During the course of the film, she inadvertently loses Patrick – but then finds him waiting for her at the end of a 5 km charity run (where she raised £1,000 for a mobility scooter).

In the closing scenes, Sarah and Ben sail a boat down a river with Ben's daughter on deck.

== Cast ==
- Beattie Edmondson as Sarah Francis
- Ed Skrein as Oliver
- Tom Bennett as Ben
- Emily Atack as Becky
- Jennifer Saunders as Maureen
- Adrian Scarborough as Mr. Peters
- Bernard Cribbins as Albert
- Peter Davison as Alan
- Cherie Lunghi as Rosemary
- Meera Syal as Head Teacher Phillips
- Roy Hudd as Eric the Caretaker
- Gemma Jones as Celia
- Olivia Buckland as Vet's Receptionist

== Release ==
The film was originally scheduled for an 24 August 2018 release, but in November 2017 the film was pushed forward to 29 June 2018 in place of the initial UK release of Ant-Man and the Wasp, which was pushed back to 3 August 2018 to avoid competition with the 2018 FIFA World Cup. The film opened at #8 in the UK, moving up to #7 the following week.

In other countries, the film was released by various other distributors later in 2018. It received a limited release in the United States in February 2019 by Screen Media Films, grossing $6,290.

=== Home media ===
The movie was released on DVD in the UK on 3 November 2018 by Walt Disney Studios Home Entertainment under the Buena Vista Home Entertainment label.

== Reception ==
=== Critical response ===
On Rotten Tomatoes, the film has an approval rating of 37% based on 35 reviews. The site's critical consensus reads, "Its pugnacious protagonist is certainly adorable, but the thoroughly formulaic Patrick will only give paws to the most pup-obsessed film fans." On Metacritic the film has a score of 28 based on reviews from nine critics, indicating "generally unfavorable reviews".
