= Pride (Amy Macdonald song) =

Single by Amy Macdonald

from the album Life in a Beautiful Light
- Released: 13 August 2012
- Recorded: 2011
- Genre: Indie pop, folk
- Length: 3:22
- Label: Mercury Records
- Songwriter: Amy Macdonald
- Producer: Pete Wilkinson

Amy Macdonald singles chronology
"Slow It Down" (2012)	"Pride" (2012)	"4th of July" (2012)

Music videos
- "Pride" on YouTube

"Pride" is a single released by Scottish singer Amy Macdonald as the second single from her third studio album, Life in a Beautiful Light (2012). Written by Macdonald and produced by Pete Wilkinson, it was released on 13 August 2012 and was heavily inspired by the sense of pride and fulfilment Macdonald experienced when singing the national anthem of Scotland, "Flower of Scotland", ahead of Scotland national football team games at the national stadium.

== Background ==
In an interview with BBC Breakfast on 11 June 2012, Macdonald said that the song was inspired from when she sings the national anthem of Scotland at Hampden Park. She also said she is lucky that she gets asked to perform before all of Scotland's international matches. Macdonald says it is an honor and it is something that she always gets nervous about, but it is such a buzz afterwards that she loves to do it.

== Release ==
=== Promotion ===
On 7 July 2012 she performed the song at T in the Park in the King Tut's Wah Wah Tent. On 7 August 2012 she performed the song on daily entertainment show Beat TV on ITV2 which is also shown in 30 other countries including South Africa, United States and Italy. On 14 August 2012 she performed the song on The Rob Brydon Show. On 21 December 2012 she performed the song on The Graham Norton Show. On 10 September 2012 she performed a modified version of the song at 'Our Greatest Team Parade' held in London to celebrate the success of British athletes at the Olympic and Paralympic Games.

=== Critical reception ===
"Pride" has been described as "a beautiful track, which was inspired by Amy performing Scotland’s unofficial national anthem Flower of Scotland in Hampden Park before all of Scotland’s international football matches" by Sophie Sinclair writing in HTF Magazine. More Than Music was less favourable, claiming that Life in a Beautiful Light, the album in which "Pride" features, contains "many tracks that feel as though they were provided by a stadium rock style electronic generator, an inclination fuelled by the lingering doubt that at times the words don’t even quite fit the music". It claimed that "there are glimmers of variation and some slightly softer acoustic moments, Pride being a reasonable example, but not enough to be reassuring since they are ultimately always trampled over by overbearing and soulless backing tracks".

=== Commercial reception ===
In Macdonald's native Scotland, "Pride" peaked at number eighty seven on the official Scottish Singles Charts before falling out the Top 100 of the Scottish Singles Charts the following week. It missed the Top 100 in the United Kingdom entirely, achieving a chart position of number one hundred and eighty seven. Similarly, in Belgium, it missed the Top 100 of the Ultratop 50 Singles (Flemish chart), but reached number thirty nine on the Ultratip Bubbling Under Flanders.

Macdonald in the music video for "Pride" overlooking Glasgow

== Music video ==
On 11 July 2012, Macdonald announced that she would be filming the video saying "Filming the video for Pride 2moro in Glasgow. Praying for a bit of respite from this beautiful Scottish summertime!" On 12 July 2012 she wrote "What a surprise! It's not raining!! Got loads of extra people helping in the video today, my bits not till later! Can't wait to see it :-)". The music video was first released onto YouTube on 6 August 2012 at a total length of three minutes and twenty-four seconds. Shortly after the video was uploaded it had to be removed due to technical issues. A new music video was uploaded shortly afterwards.

The video for "Pride" begins with Amy walking beside the River Clyde in Glasgow, it then shows Macdonald singing on a roof in Glasgow city centre. The video also shows a variety of people across Scotland including a footballer and a young boy walking into Hampden Park, two young girls in a Judo match, a farmer, a family, two sailors, a man who carried the Olympic torch, a local football team and a welder. The video also shows shots of Loch Lommond, Hampden Park and aerial shots of Glasgow.

== Track listing ==
Digital download
No.	Title	Lyrics	Producer	Length
1.	"Pride"	Amy Macdonald	Pete Wilkinson	3:22

== Chart performance ==
Chart (2012)	Peak position
Belgium (Ultratip Bubbling Under Flanders)	39
Scotland (OCC)	87
UK Singles (OCC)	187

== Release history ==
Region	Date	Format	Label
United Kingdom	13 August 2012	Digital download	Mercury Records

== See also ==
- Hampden Park; the home stadium of the Scottish national football team which inspired the writing of the song
- Scotland national football team; the national football team of Macdonald's home country. Macdonald was inspired to write "Pride" following performing the Scottish national anthem "Flower of Scotland" prior to Scotland football matches at Hampden Park
