= Under Stars =

Studio album by Amy Macdonald
- Released: 17 February 2017
- Recorded: October 2015 – August 2016
- Studio: RAK Studios (London)
- Genre: Pop rock; soft rock
- Length: 38:59
- Label: Melodramatic; Mercury; Vertigo
- Producer: Cam Blackwood; Tim Bran; Roy Kerr; Andrew Britton; Ash Howes; Mikey Rowe

Amy Macdonald chronology
Life in a Beautiful Light (2012)	Under Stars (2017)	Under Stars (Live in Berlin) (2017)

Amy Macdonald studio album chronology
Life in a Beautiful Light (2012)	Under Stars (2017)	The Human Demands (2020)

Singles from Under Stars
- 1. "Dream On" Released: 6 January 2017; 2. "Automatic" Released: 24 March 2017; 3. "Down by the Water" Released: 11 July 2017

Under Stars is the fourth album by Scottish singer-songwriter Amy Macdonald, and was released on 17 February 2017. The album's lead single, "Dream On", was released on 6 January 2017, and achieved some commercial success, notably in her native Scotland where it peaked at number twenty-eight on the official Scottish Singles Charts. In continental Europe, it achieved commercial success particularly in Belgium and Switzerland.

== Background ==
Macdonald began writing songs for the album in early 2014, two years after the release of Life in a Beautiful Light. In May 2014, she performed four new songs live. She also sang "Leap of Faith" during the Scottish independence referendum in September 2014. In March 2015, Macdonald announced via Twitter she was finishing the songwriting of the album, but had not yet started recording. On 28 October 2015, she announced via Twitter she started the recording sessions for the album. Later, she stated on 9 December 2015 via her Instagram account that she had finished the songwriting for the album and that she hoped the album would be finished sometime in 2016. On 9 August 2016, Macdonald announced via Instagram her fourth album was finished and would be released early 2017.

Macdonald said although it was two and a half years in the making, which is the longest she has ever taken with an album, she was glad to have taken the time and she feels the album has "the TLC that it deserves".

== Release ==
Macdonald's official website and official Facebook fanpage confirmed the album for release on 25 November 2016. Album title and tracklist were confirmed the same day by both sites. The album went onto achieve considerable commercial success, reaching number one in Switzerland, number two in the United Kingdom, Scotland and Germany, and the top ten in both Austria and New Zealand.

"Dream On" was released as the lead single from the album on 6 January 2017. The song has peaked to number 37 on the Scottish Singles Chart. The song also charted in Belgium. "Automatic" was released as the second single off the album on 24 March 2017. The accompanying music video was released on her Vevo channel on 17 March 2017. "Down by the Water" was released as the third single from the album on 11 July 2017, on the same day as the accompanying music video. An acoustic version of the song was previously released in late 2016 as a promotional single from the album before its release.

== Critical reception ==
Professional ratings
Review scores
Source	Rating
AllMusic	3.5/5 stars
Daily Express	4/5 stars
London Evening Standard	3/5 stars
Pop Magazine	3.5/5 stars
Renowned for Sound	4/5 stars
The Scotsman	3/5 stars

The album up to now has gathered mixed to positive reviews, receiving a score of 3 out of 5 stars at the London Evening Standard, describing the album as "a tuneful collection that doesn't mess with the formula".

== Track listings ==
=== Standard edition ===
Under Stars track listing
No.	Title	Writer(s)	Producer(s)	Length
1.	"Dream On"	Amy Macdonald; Ben Parker; James Sims	Andrew Britton; Mikey Rowe; Ash Howes	3:19
2.	"Under Stars"	Macdonald; Parker; Sims	Cameron Blackwood; Tim Bran; Roy Kerr	3:41
3.	"Automatic"	Macdonald; Parker; Sims	Blackwood; Bran; Kerr	3:16
4.	"Down by the Water"	Macdonald; Parker; Sims	Bran; Kerr; Parker; Sims	3:27
5.	"Leap of Faith"	Macdonald	Blackwood; Bran; Kerr	3:03
6.	"Never Too Late"	Macdonald; Adam Falkner; Shannon Harris	Blackwood; Bran; Kerr	4:06
7.	"The Rise & Fall"	Macdonald; Parker; Sims	Britton; Rowe	3:13
8.	"Feed My Fire"	Macdonald; Parker; Sims	Blackwood; Bran; Kerr	3:15
9.	"The Contender"	Macdonald; Parker; Sims	Blackwood	3:36
10.	"Prepare to Fall"	Macdonald	Blackwood	4:30
11.	"From the Ashes"	Macdonald; Parker; Sims	Bran; Kerr	3:36

=== Deluxe edition ===
No.	Title	Writer(s)	Producer(s)	Length
1.	"Dream On"	Amy Macdonald; Ben Parker; James Sims	Andrew Britton; Ash Howes; Mikey Rowe	3:19
2.	"Under Stars"	Macdonald; Parker; Sims	Cameron Blackwood; Tim Bran; Roy Kerr	3:41
3.	"Automatic"	Macdonald; Parker; Sims	Blackwood; Bran; Kerr	3:16
4.	"Down by the Water"	Macdonald; Parker; Sims	Bran; Kerr; Parker; Sims	3:27
5.	"Leap of Faith"	Macdonald	Blackwood; Bran; Kerr	3:03
6.	"Never Too Late"	Macdonald; Adam Falkner; Shannon Harris	Blackwood; Bran; Kerr	4:06
7.	"The Rise & Fall"	Macdonald; Parker; Sims	Britton; Rowe	3:13
8.	"Feed My Fire"	Macdonald; Parker; Sims	Blackwood; Bran; Kerr	3:15
9.	"The Contender"	Macdonald; Parker; Sims	Blackwood	3:36
10.	"Prepare to Fall"	Macdonald	Blackwood	4:30
11.	"From the Ashes"	Macdonald; Parker; Sims	Bran; Kerr	3:36
12.	"Under Stars" (acoustic)	Macdonald; Parker; Sims	Parker	3:40
13.	"Dream On" (acoustic)	Macdonald; Parker; Sims	Parker	3:16
14.	"Prepare to Fall" (acoustic)	Macdonald	Parker	4:03
15.	"Leap of Faith" (acoustic)	Macdonald	Parker	3:10
16.	"Automatic" (acoustic)	Macdonald; Parker; Sims	Parker	3:05
17.	"Down by the Water" (acoustic)	Macdonald; Parker; Sims	Parker	3:28
18.	"The Rise & Fall" (acoustic)	Macdonald; Parker; Sims	Parker	3:34
19.	"I'm on Fire" (acoustic)	Bruce Springsteen	Parker	2:20

=== Super deluxe box set ===
A super deluxe box set was also released that contains:

- Deluxe edition of the album
- DVD of 8 live acoustic versions
- 4 art images (one signed by Macdonald)
- Handwritten printed lyric sheets
- Embossed black envelope

== Charts ==
=== Weekly charts ===
Chart (2017)	Peak position
Austrian Albums (Ö3 Austria)	4
Belgian Albums (Ultratop Flanders)	21
Belgian Albums (Ultratop Wallonia)	18
Dutch Albums (Album Top 100)	18
French Albums (SNEP)	88
German Albums (Offizielle Top 100)	2
Irish Albums (IRMA)	75
New Zealand Heatseeker Albums (RMNZ)	10
Polish Albums (ZPAV)	39
Scottish Albums (Official Charts)	2
Spanish Albums (Promusicae)	75
Swiss Albums (Schweizer Hitparade)	1
UK Albums (Official Charts)	2

=== Year-end charts ===
Chart (2017)	Position
Austrian Albums (Ö3 Austria)	74
Belgian Albums (Ultratop Flanders)	184
Belgian Albums (Ultratop Wallonia)	199
German Albums (Offizielle Top 100)	54
Swiss Albums (Schweizer Hitparade)	17

== Certifications ==
Sales certifications for Under Stars
Region	Certification	Certified units/sales
Germany (BVMI)	Gold	100,000^{‡}
Switzerland (IFPI Switzerland)	Gold	10,000^{^}
United Kingdom (BPI)	Silver	60,000^{‡}
^{^} Shipments figures based on certification alone.^{‡} Sales+streaming figures based on certification alone.
