= Life in a Beautiful Light =

Studio album by Amy Macdonald
- Released: 11 June 2012
- Studio: Mayfield Studios (United Kingdom); State of the Ark (Surrey, England)
- Genre: Pop rock, soft rock
- Length: 45:31
- Label: Melodramatic, Mercury, Vertigo
- Producer: Pete Wilkinson

Amy Macdonald chronology
Love Love UK & European Arena Tour LIVE 2010 (2011)	Life in a Beautiful Light (2012)	Under Stars (2017)

Amy Macdonald studio album chronology
A Curious Thing (2010)	Life in a Beautiful Light (2012)	Under Stars (2017)

Singles from Life in a Beautiful Light
- 1. "Slow It Down" Released: 20 April 2012; 2. "Pride" Released: 13 August 2012; 3. "4th of July" Released: 22 October 2012

Life in a Beautiful Light is the third album by Scottish singer-songwriter Amy Macdonald, released on 11 June 2012. Macdonald's official website confirmed the album for release on 13 April 2012, with the track listing confirmed by Universal Music on the same day. The album was produced by Pete Wilkinson, and released via Melodramatic, Mercury and Vertigo. The album was supported by the release of its lead single, "Slow It Down", on 20 April 2012, and achieved strong commercial positions across Europe, particularly in Poland, Belgium and her native Scotland. The album was further supported by the release of two singles – "Pride" and "4th of July".

Released to favourable reviews, the album was a commercial success in Europe, debuting at number one in Austria and Germany, number two in her native Scotland and the United Kingdom, as well as the top five in Switzerland, Belgium, Ireland and the Netherlands. It has subsequently been awarded Gold certifications in both Poland and the United Kingdom, whilst achieving Platinum certifications in Germany and Switzerland.

== Background ==
Macdonald began to write Life in a Beautiful Light after having a "lovely year off" following touring in support of A Curious Thing. Macdonald had no time to write songs on her second album as she was touring with This Is the Life. However, Macdonald said she felt that the creation of Life in a Beautiful Light was a more natural process. Two songs from Life in a Beautiful Light were begun before Macdonald's break. "In the End" was written with Macdonald questioning herself whether being a musician was a worthwhile occupation.

Macdonald wrote "Human Spirit" inspired by the Chilean miners' rescue. The song "Left That Body Long Ago" described her grandmother's decline into Alzheimer's disease whilst "Across the Nile" is a response to the conflict of the Arab Spring.

== Chart performance ==
On 14 June 2012 Life in a Beautiful Light entered the Irish Albums Chart at number 5, making it her highest-charting album in Ireland. On 17 June 2012 the album entered the UK Albums Chart at number 2, making it the second highest-charting album that week, only beaten by Gary Barlow's album Sing. Only 1,000 copies separated the top three albums. The album fared better in Scotland, where it debuted at number one.

It was awarded Platinum status in both Germany and Switzerland, indicating sales in excess of 200,000 and 30,000 copies respectively, and in the United Kingdom was awarded Gold certification by the British Phonographic Industry (BPI), indicating sales in excess of 100,000. Additionally, in Poland, it was also certified Gold, indicating sales of over 10,000 copies.

== Singles ==
Professional ratings
Aggregate scores
Source	Rating
Metacritic	60/100
Review scores
Source	Rating
AllMusic	3/5 stars
Daily Express	3/5 stars
Hot Press	3/5 stars
musicOMH	3/5 stars
Sputnikmusic	3/5 stars
The Scotsman	2/5 stars
The Tech	4/5 stars

"Slow It Down" was released as the albums lead single on 20 April 2012. It achieved considerable commercial success across Europe, particularly in the continent, where it reached the top five in Poland, top twenty in Belgium and Scotland, and also the top forty in both Germany and Switzerland. It was eventually certified Gold in Germany, indicating sales in excess of 150,000 copies. In the United Kingdom, it missed the official UK Top 40 by five places, debuting and peaking at number forty five on the official UK Singles Charts, before falling to number forty eight in its second week. In its third week on the UK Singles Chart, it stood at number eighty four, before falling out of the UK Top 100 entirely. Moderate success was achieved in Ireland, where it reached number fifty seven on the Irish Singles Chart.

"Pride" was released as the second single from the album on 13 August 2012. In an interview with BBC Breakfast Macdonald said that the song was inspired from singing the unofficial national anthem of Scotland Flower of Scotland at Hampden Park, saying "it is an honor and it is something that she always gets nervous about, but it is such a buzz afterwards that she loves to do it". It reached the top 100 of the Scottish Singles Charts, peaking at number eighty-seven, and thirty-nine on the Ultratip Bubbling Under Flanders Charts in Belgium. "4th of July" was released as the third and final single from the album on 22 October 2012.

== Critical reception ==
The album up to now has gathered mixed reviews, earning a collective score of 5.1 out of 10 at AnyDecentMusic?. The Upcoming described the album as a "strong return from Macdonald, interweaving her distinctive voice with splashing cymbals and burbling electronica, but still intermittently flirting with folky affectations". The album received 60/100 on Metacritic, a review aggregator website, signifying "mixed or average reviews".

== Track listings ==
All songs written by Amy Macdonald

=== Standard edition ===
No.	Title	Length
1.	"4th of July"	3:48
2.	"Pride"	3:22
3.	"Slow It Down"	3:52
4.	"The Furthest Star"	3:29
5.	"The Game"	4:24
6.	"Across the Nile"	3:19
7.	"The Days of Being Young and Free"	4:09
8.	"Left That Body Long Ago"	4:49
9.	"Life in a Beautiful Light"	4:35
10.	"Human Spirit"	2:06
11.	"The Green and the Blue"	3:53
12.	"In the End / Two Worlds" (hidden track)	8:05

=== Deluxe edition ===
No.	Title	Length
1.	"4th of July"	3:48
2.	"Pride"	3:22
3.	"Slow It Down"	3:52
4.	"The Furthest Star"	3:29
5.	"The Game"	4:24
6.	"Across the Nile"	3:19
7.	"The Days of Being Young and Free"	4:09
8.	"Left That Body Long Ago"	4:49
9.	"Life in a Beautiful Light"	4:35
10.	"Human Spirit"	2:06
11.	"The Green and the Blue"	3:53
12.	"In the End"	3:52
13.	"Slow It Down" (acoustic version)	3:46
14.	"The Furthest Star" (acoustic version)	3:07
15.	"The Green and the Blue" (acoustic version)	2:50
16.	"Across the Nile" (acoustic version; iTunes exclusive)	3:10
17.	"4th of July" (acoustic version)	3:03
18.	"Slow It Down" (singalong instrumental version)	3:56
19.	"4th of July" (singalong instrumental version)	3:48
20.	"Pride" (singalong instrumental version)	3:24
21.	"Two Worlds" (hidden track)	3:52

iTunes bonus track
No.	Title	Length
21.	"Pride" (acoustic version)	3:18

Saturn bonus tracks
No.	Title	Length
21.	"Born to Run" (acoustic version)	3:32
22.	"Life in a Beautiful Light" (acoustic version)	3:16

Spotify bonus tracks
No.	Title	Length
13.	"Slow It Down" (Spotify version; acoustic live)	3:35
14.	"Pride" (Spotify version; acoustic live)	3:24

=== Super deluxe box set ===
A super deluxe box set was also released that contains:

- Standard edition of the album
- Bonus CD: A selection of acoustic versions, and singalong instrumentals
- DVD-5 acoustic versions live
- 2 litho artwork numbered prints
- Sheet music for "Slow It Down"

"Amy Macdonald guitar pic"

== Charts and certifications ==
=== Weekly charts ===
Chart (2012)	Peak position
Austrian Albums (Ö3 Austria)	1
Belgian Albums (Ultratop Flanders)	4
Belgian Albums (Ultratop Wallonia)	6
Danish Albums (Hitlisten)	9
Dutch Albums (Album Top 100)	5
French Albums (SNEP)	42
German Albums (Offizielle Top 100)	1
Irish Albums (IRMA)	5
Norwegian Albums (VG-lista)	15
Polish Albums Chart	11
Scottish Albums (Official Charts)	1
Spanish Albums (Promusicae)	36
Swedish Albums (Sverigetopplistan)	34
Swiss Albums (Schweizer Hitparade)	2
UK Albums (Official Charts)	2

=== Year-end charts ===
Chart (2012)	Position
Austrian Albums (Ö3 Austria)	33
Belgian Albums (Ultratop Flanders)	78
Belgian Albums (Ultratop Wallonia)	71
German Albums (Offizielle Top 100)	21
Swiss Albums (Schweizer Hitparade)	8
UK Albums (OCC)	73

=== Certifications ===
Region	Certification	Certified units/sales
Germany (BVMI)	Platinum	200,000^{^}
Poland (ZPAV)	Gold	10,000^{*}
Switzerland (IFPI Switzerland)	Platinum	30,000^{^}
United Kingdom (BPI)	Gold	100,000^{*}
^{*} Sales figures based on certification alone.^{^} Shipments figures based on certification alone.
