= Slow It Down (Amy Macdonald song) =

2012 single by Amy Macdonald

Single by Amy Macdonald

from the album Life in a Beautiful Light
- Released: 20 April 2012
- Recorded: 2011; State of the Ark Studios (Richmond, London), Mayfield Studio (Surrey)
- Genre: Soft rock, folk rock, rock
- Length: 3:52
- Label: Mercury Records
- Songwriter: Amy Macdonald
- Producer: Pete Wilkinson

Amy Macdonald singles chronology
"Your Time Will Come" (2010)	"Slow It Down" (2012)	"Pride" (2012)

Music video
- "Slow It Down" on YouTube

"Slow It Down" is a single release by Scottish recording artist Amy Macdonald, released as the lead single from her third studio album, Life in a Beautiful Light. The song was released on 20 April 2012 and was written by Amy Macdonald and produced by Pete Wilkinson. The song entered the UK Singles Chart at number 45, her highest charting single since "This Is the Life" peaked to number 28 in 2007. The song also achieved considerable success in other European markets such as Austria, Belgium, Germany, Scotland and Switzerland.

It achieved a Gold certification by Bundesverband Musikindustrie in Germany, indicating sales and streams in excess of 150,000. "Slow It Down" was one of three songs re–recorded by Macdonald for inclusion on her 2022 extended play release Don't Tell Me That It's Over.

== Background and release ==
In an interview with BBC Breakfast on 11 June 2012 she said the song was about her taking a break and slowing down her life and stopping all the manicness for a while. Macdonald claims that it is largely wrongly assumed by fans that "Slow It Down" was written with Macdonald's admiration for fast cars in mind. Macdonald has since disputed this, claiming that "my love of cars doesn’t actually come up in the album, I think that’s something that’s got muddled into it along the way. I think people think ‘Slow it Down’ is about that but it isn’t actually. There is a love of football in there though, I’ll give you that one".

"Slow It Down" was released as the lead single from Macdonald's third studio album, Life in a Beautiful Light (2012) on 20 April 2012. The song was sent to radio stations across Europe on 10 May 2012, and was anticipated to "take her straight back to the top of the European charts". It was released on different dates across Europe – 20 April 2012 for digital download only in Belgium and airplay in the United Kingdom, 27 April 2012 for airplay in Italy, a CD single release on 4 May 2012 in Germany and 15 May 2012 in the United Kingdom, and a digital download release date in Italy on 16 May 2012.

== Commercial performance ==
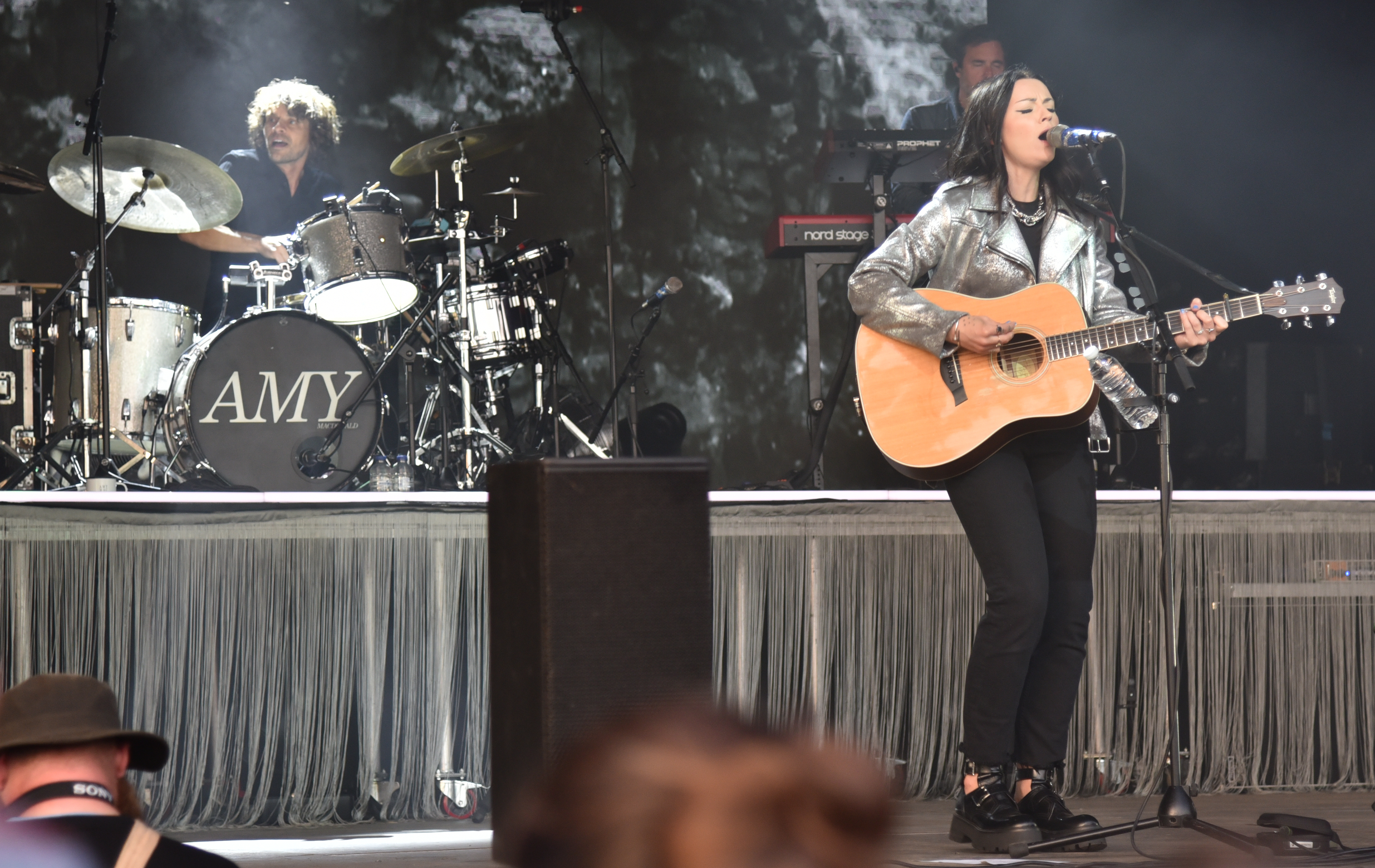
Macdonald performing "Slow It Down" in July 2022

Upon its release, "Slow It Down" was a major European success for Macdonald, and was largely viewed as a continuation of Macdonald's previous European success with previous released such as "Mr Rock & Roll" (2007), "This Is the Life" (2007) and "Don't Tell Me That It's Over" (2010). It performed particularly strongly across continental European music markets, achieving its highest position in Poland, where it peaked at number five on the Polish Airplay Top 100. In Switzerland, it spent a total of eight weeks on the Swiss Hitparade charts, where it achieved a peak of number twenty four. Prior to the release of "Slow It Down", Macdonald achieved considerable success in Germany, and the release of "Slow It Down" would ultimately be no different. The song reached number thirty eight on the GfK Entertainment charts in Germany, spending a total of twenty four weeks within the Top 100 of the German charts, beginning in May and falling out of the German charts by October 2012. Elsewhere across continental Europe, it reached number forty three in Austria on the Ö3 Austria Top 40 charts, spending a total of twenty two weeks on the charts in Austria. In Belgium, it failed to chart on both the official charts in Flanders and Wallonia, but did peak at number fourteen on the Ultratip Bubbling Under Wallonia charts and number fifteen on the Ultratip Bubbling Under Flanders charts.

In her native Scotland, it achieved considerable success. It peaked at number sixteen on the official Scottish Singles Charts. In the United Kingdom, it missed the official UK Top 40 by five places, debuting and peaking at number forty five on the official UK Singles Charts, before falling to number forty eight in its second week. In its third week on the UK Singles Chart, it stood at number eighty four, before falling out of the UK Top 100 entirely. Moderate success was achieved in Ireland, where it reached number fifty seven on the Irish Singles Chart.

It was awarded a Gold certification in Germany, indicating record sales and streams of 150,000.

== Music video ==
The music video for the song, directed by Pip, was released on 9 May 2012. The video was shot in the province of Almería, Spain, specifically in the Tabernas Desert and Cabo de Gata-Níjar Natural Park, and features Macdonald at dusk stranded in a desert.

The video for "Slow It Down" begins with Macdonald and a young boy overlooking the desert, it then shows the young boy cycling across the desert he then gets off the bike and starts running across the desert, it then goes from a young boy running to a young man running across the desert, he then comes across a horse, it then shows him riding the horse across the desert, he gets off the horse and starts running again, the man then jumps off a cliff into the water before swimming back to the beach, it then shows him driving a car along a road through the desert before stopping the car at the side of the road, at the end of the video it shows Macdonald and the man overlooking the desert.

== Live performances ==
On 2 June 2012 she performed the song in the finale of second edition of the Polish X-Factor along with Polish girlband The Chance participating in the competition. On 8 June 2012 she performed the song on Alan Carr's Summer Specstacular. On 11 June 2012 she performed the song live on BBC Breakfast. On 16 June 2012 she performed the song on Loose Women. On 7 July 2012 she performed the song at T in the Park in the King Tut's Wah Wah Tent.

== Track listing ==
Digital download

1. "Slow It Down" - 3:52

German 2-Track single

1. "Slow It Down" - 3:52
2. "Human Spirit" - 2:06

== Chart performance ==
Chart (2012)	Peak position
Austria (Ö3 Austria Top 40)	43
Belgium (Ultratip Bubbling Under Flanders)	15
Belgium (Ultratip Bubbling Under Wallonia)	14
Germany (GfK)	38
Ireland (IRMA)	57
Poland Airplay (ZPAV)	5
Scottish Singles Sales (Official Charts)	16
Switzerland (Schweizer Hitparade)	24
UK Singles (Official Charts)	45

== Certifications ==
Certifications and sales for "Slow It Down"
Region	Certification	Certified units/sales
Germany (BVMI)	Gold	150,000^{‡}
^{‡} Sales+streaming figures based on certification alone.

== Release history ==
Region	Date	Format	Label
Belgium	20 April 2012	Digital download	Mercury Records
United Kingdom	20 April 2012	Airplay	Mercury Records
Italy	27 April 2012	Airplay	Mercury Records
Germany	4 May 2012	CD single	Mercury Records
United Kingdom	15 May 2012	CD single	Mercury Records
Italy	16 May 2012	Digital download	Mercury Records
