= Amy Macdonald =

Scottish singer-songwriter (born 1987)

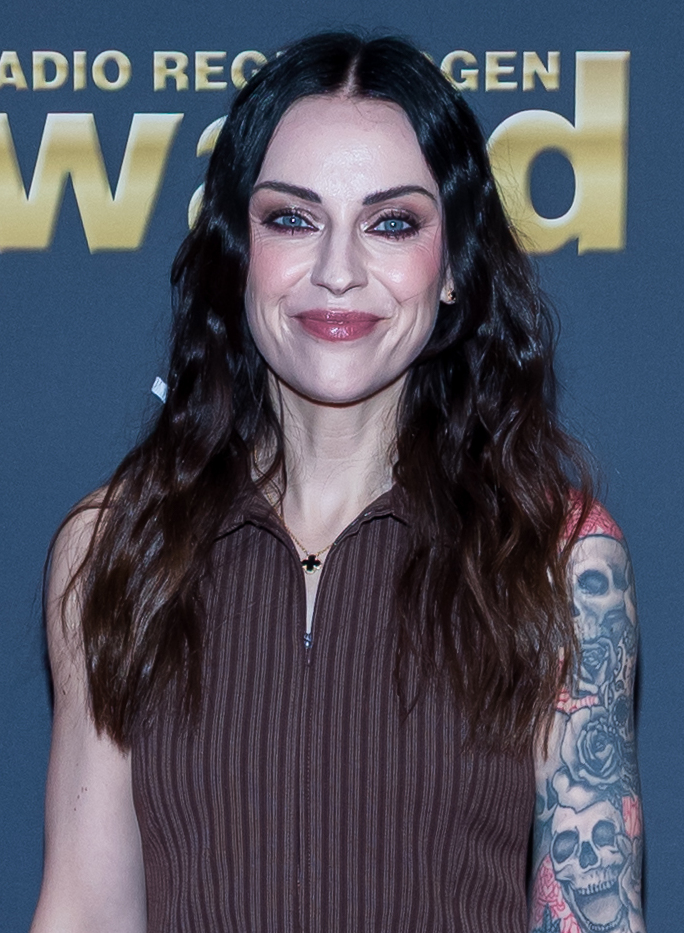
- Macdonald in 2026

Background information
- Born: Amy Elizabeth Macdonald; 25 August 1987 (age 39); Bishopbriggs, Lanarkshire, Scotland
- Genres: Folk rock; indie pop; soft rock; pop rock
- Occupation: Singer-songwriter
- Instruments: Vocals; guitar
- Years active: 2006–present
- Labels: Virgin EMI; Vertigo; Mercury; Melodramatic Records; Infectious; BMG
- Spouse: Richard Foster (m. 2018)
- Website: Official website

Amy Elizabeth Macdonald (born 25 August 1987) is a Scottish singer-songwriter. In 2007, she released her debut studio album, This Is the Life, which produced the singles "Mr. Rock & Roll" and "This Is the Life"; the latter charting at number one in six countries, while reaching the top 10 in another 11 countries. The album reached number one in four European countries – the United Kingdom, Denmark, the Netherlands and Switzerland – and sold three million copies worldwide. Moderate success in the American music market followed in 2008. Macdonald has sold over 12 million records worldwide.

Macdonald's second studio album, A Curious Thing, was released in 2010. Its lead single "Don't Tell Me That It's Over" peaked at number 45 on the UK Singles Chart, and reached the Top 10 in several mainland European countries. In 2010, she collaborated with Ray Davies on his album, See My Friends, performing a cover of the Kinks' "Dead End Street". Her third studio album, Life in a Beautiful Light, was released in 2012 and spawned three singles: "Slow It Down", "Pride" and "4th of July". In 2017, Macdonald released her fourth studio album, Under Stars, which entered at number two on the Scottish and UK Album Charts, and spawned three singles, with the lead single "Dream On" achieving success in European charts.

In 2020, Macdonald released her fifth studio album, The Human Demands, which spawned four singles and one promotional single. The lead single "The Hudson" reached number twelve in her native Scotland, whilst The Human Demands performed favourably in European album markets. She represented Scotland at the Free European Song Contest 2021 with her song "Statues", finishing in 4th place with 77 points. In April 2025, she released the lead single from her sixth studio album Is This What You've Been Waiting For? which was released on 11 July 2025.

== Early life ==
Amy Elizabeth Macdonald was born on 25 August 1987 in Bishopbriggs, nearby to Glasgow, located in the central belt of Scotland. She attended Bishopbriggs High School. After being inspired by Travis at the T in the Park festival in 2000, she heard Travis' song "Turn" and wanted to play it herself. She bought a Travis chord book, and started playing on her father's guitar, teaching herself how to play. Soon afterward she began composing her own songs, the first being called "The Wall". She started playing in pubs and coffee houses around Glasgow at the age of 15, including the Brunswick Cellars on Sauchiehall Street.

== Career ==
=== 2006–2007: Breakthrough ===
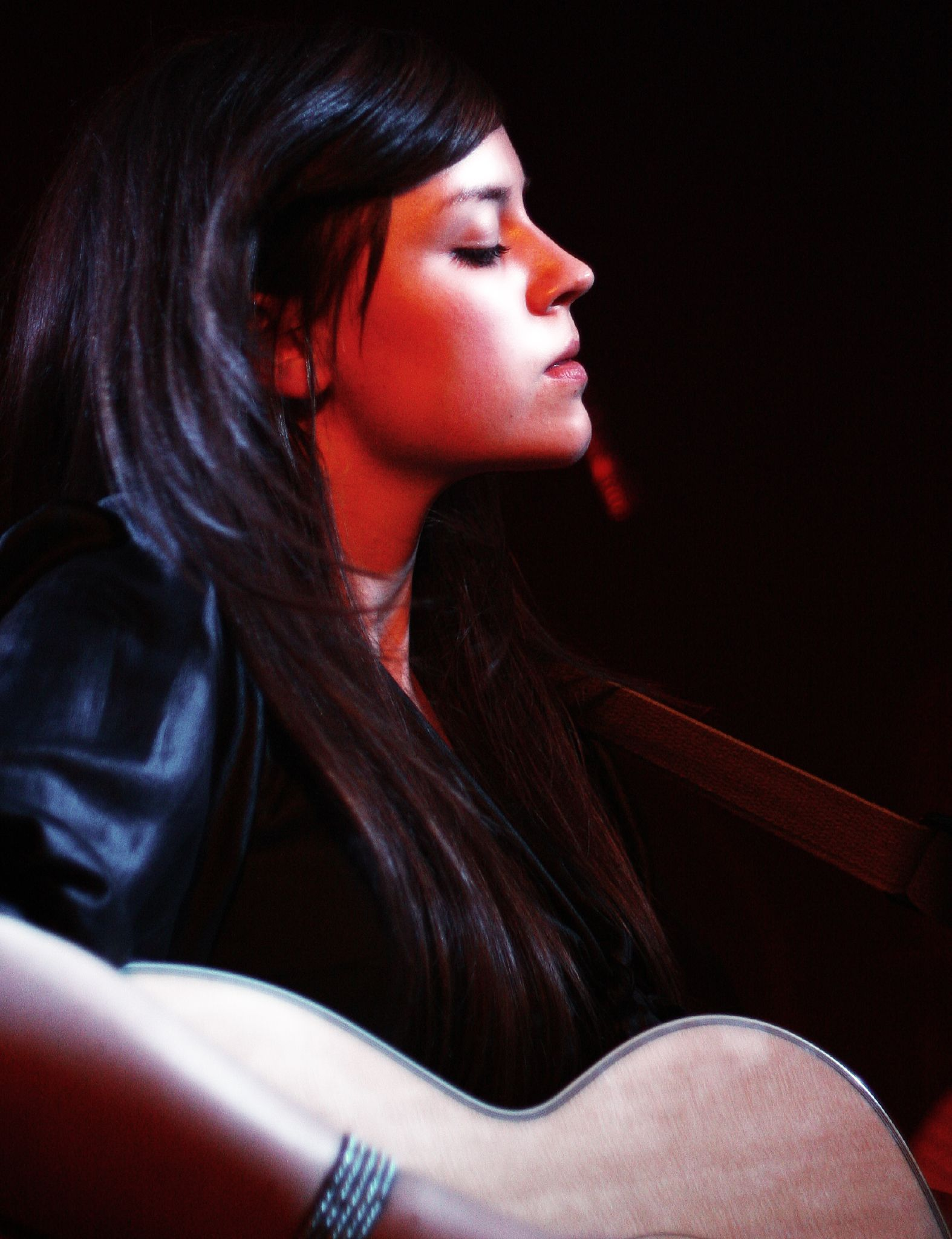
Macdonald performing in 2007

Macdonald sent a demo CD in response to an advertisement placed in the NME by a new production company set up by songwriters Pete Wilkinson and Sarah Erasmus. Wilkinson said he was "literally aghast" at her songwriting abilities when first he heard Macdonald play the songs "This Is the Life" and "Mr Rock n Roll". He then spent around eight or nine months recording demos with Macdonald at his home studio with a view to securing a record deal for his new client. In 2007 she signed a contract with Vertigo when she was 18 years old.

She has claimed that she feels she was "in the right place at the right time" by answering the advertisement in NME, later claiming that the subsequent success she endured to be "a weird life". Macdonald has been described as "one of the last artists" to gain a recording contract by sending a demo to record companies, with Macdonald claiming it to be "mental", citing the music industry changes since 2007. Macdonald claims that "what's funny is even then, everyone found it bizarre that I got a record deal from sending a demo, because this was when people were being discovered on MySpace — Lily Allen, Arctic Monkeys; they were all doing it that way".

=== 2007–2011: This Is the Life and A Curious Thing ===
In 2007 Macdonald released her debut album, titled This Is the Life. The album sold three million copies, and reached No. 1 in the UK, the Netherlands, Switzerland and Denmark. This Is the Life reached No. 92 on the US Billboard 200. The single, "This Is the Life" reached No. 25 on the US Billboard Triple-A radio airplay charts. The first single from the album, "Poison Prince", was only a limited release. The second single, "Mr. Rock and Roll", became Macdonald's first top 40 song, charting at No. 12 in the United Kingdom. However the third single, "LA", missed the top 40 at No. 48.

The fourth and most successful single, "This Is the Life", charted at No. 28 in the UK, and was No. 1 in five other European countries ― Austria, Belgium, Czech Republic and the Netherlands. In her native Scotland, it achieved considerable success, peaking at number seventeen. The single was awarded Platinum in Germany and Belgium and Gold in Spain and Switzerland. It was also the theme song of True Law (Prawo Agaty), a Polish legal drama TV series. The fifth single, "Run", gave Macdonald her second lowest chart position in the UK at No. 75. However, "Run" charted at No. 36 in Germany. The sixth and final single was the re-release of "Poison Prince"; it charted at No. 148 in the UK, Macdonald's lowest chart position. The album's track "Youth of Today" was chosen as the first single featured on Bebo/iTunes' "Free Single of the Week" program.

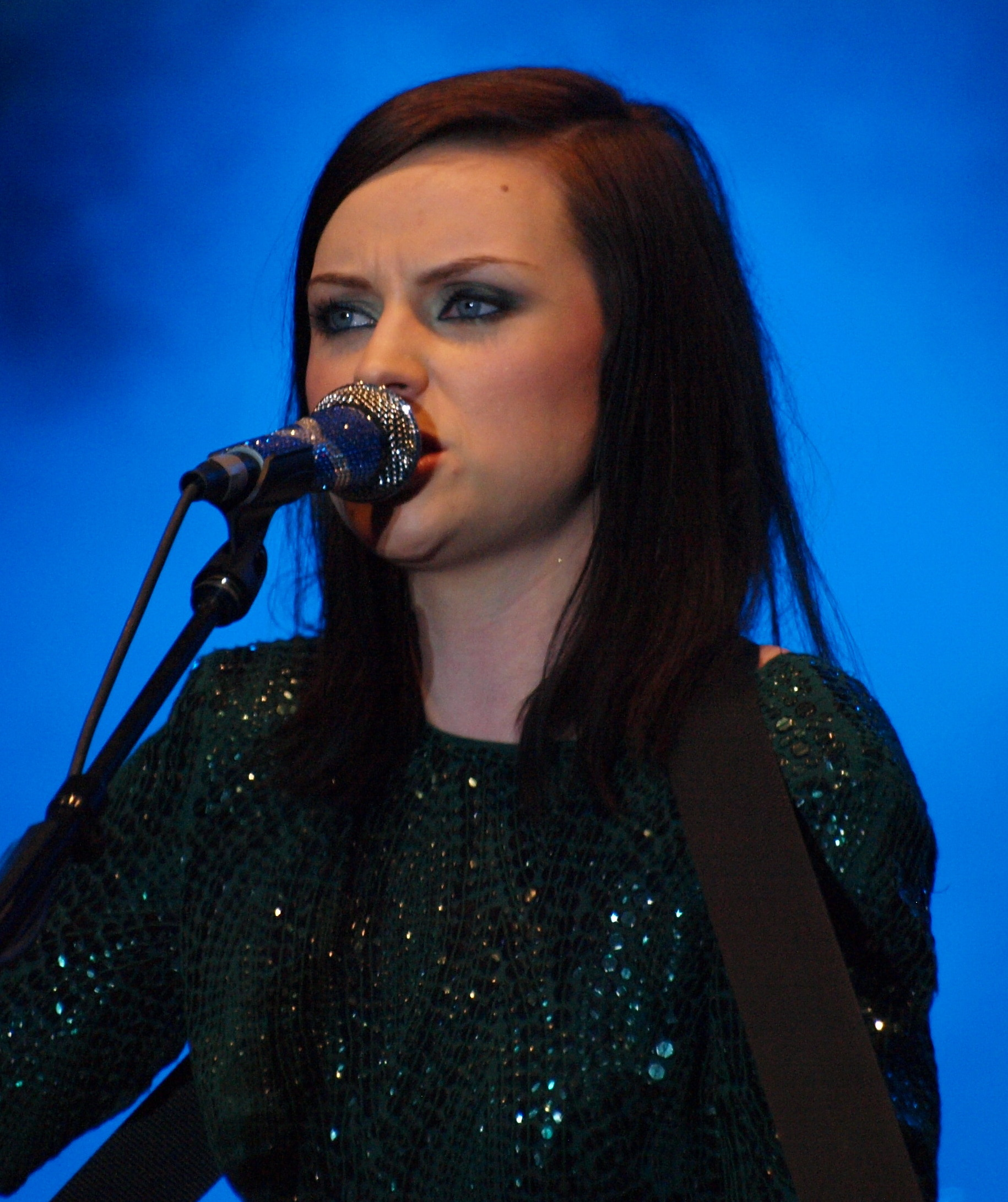
Macdonald performing in Stockholm, Sweden, 2010

She appeared as a musical performing guest on British and foreign shows including The Album Chart Show, Loose Women, Friday Night Project, Taratata (France), and This Morning. She won the best newcomer award at the Silver Clef Awards. She has appeared on several US talk shows such as The Late Late Show with Craig Ferguson (2008), where she performed "Mr. Rock and Roll" and also The Ellen DeGeneres Show (2008) where she performed her hit single, "This Is the Life".

Macdonald began working on her second album in 2009. She said "Some of the sounds are just amazing and we've managed to persuade one of my favourite artists to whack some stuff down on them, but you'll have to wait and see." The artist in question was Paul Weller, who contributed electric guitar on the track "Love Love" and piano and bass guitar on the track "This Pretty Face". Titled A Curious Thing, it was released on 8 March 2010.

The album was preceded by the release of the first single from it, "Don't Tell Me That It's Over", a week earlier on 1 March 2010. The single was released to UK radio on 11 January, and Amy performed it that same day on the Simon Mayo Show on BBC Radio 2. "Don't Tell Me That It's Over" was also released to radio in countries like UK, Switzerland, Germany and France. The album's second single "Spark" was released on 10 May 2010 on digital download format. Macdonald also confirmed that she would tour the United Kingdom and other parts of Europe in 2010.

The album's third single "This Pretty Face" was released on 19 July 2010 after Macdonald confirmed she would embark on a tour entitled The Love Love Tour. Also that year, she was one of a number of artists who recorded with Ray Davies on his 2010 album See My Friends, in which she sang with him on "Dead End Street".

=== 2011–2015: Life in a Beautiful Light ===
Macdonald's third album, Life in a Beautiful Light, was released on 11 June 2012. Macdonald began to write Life in a Beautiful Light after having a "lovely year off" following touring in support of A Curious Thing. Macdonald had no time to write songs on her second album as she was touring with This Is the Life. However, Macdonald said she felt that the creation of Life in a Beautiful Light was a more natural process. Two songs from Life in a Beautiful Light were begun before Macdonald's break. "In the End" was written with Macdonald questioning herself whether being a musician was a worthwhile occupation.

Macdonald wrote "Human Spirit" inspired by the Chilean miners' rescue. The song "Left That Body Long Ago" described her grandmother's decline into Alzheimer's disease whilst "Across the Nile" is a response to the conflict of the Arab Spring.

Three songs from the album were released as singles: "Slow It Down", "Pride" and "4th of July". She told BBC News that Pride was written to describe her feelings about performing Flower of Scotland at Hampden Park prior to Scotland international football matches. Macdonald wrote the last track on the album, In the End, at the end of her previous tour and Life in a Beautiful Light was then recorded in Surrey. It was produced by Pete Wilkinson and mixed by Bob Clearmountain, who previously worked on her debut album. On 2 June 2012 she sang her song "Slow It Down" with the finalist of the second season of the Polish version of The X Factor, a girl group the Chance.

She co–presented the Real Radio Breakfast show alongside Ewen Cameron in 2012 whilst regular presenter Cat Harvey was on holiday. In 2014, she performed at the 2014 Commonwealth Games opening ceremony. In the television broadcast of the event, Macdonald performs "Rhythm of My Heart" in the middle of George Square with Glaswegians, before panning to Macdonald performing the song live in Celtic Park during the opening ceremony in which she was later joined by Rod Stewart.

=== 2016–2018: Under Stars ===
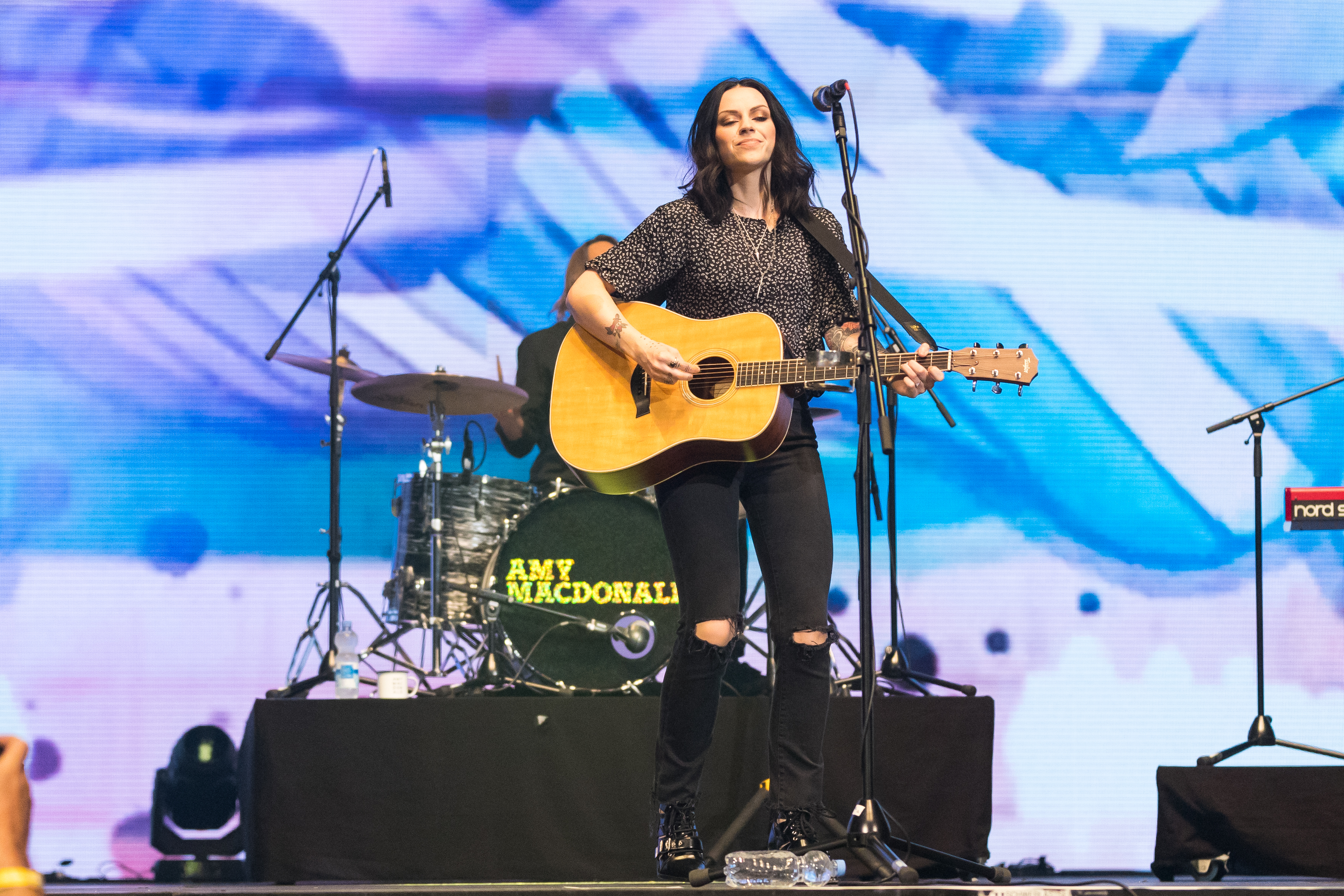
Macdonald performing at the SAP Arena, Germany, 2018

Macdonald began writing songs for a new album in early 2014, 2 years following the release of her previous album, Life in a Beautiful Light. In May 2014, she performed 4 new songs live. She also sang "Leap of Faith" during the Scottish independence referendum in September 2014. In March 2015, Macdonald announced via Twitter she was finishing the songwriting of the album, but had not yet started recording. On 28 October 2015, she announced via Twitter she started the recording sessions for the album. Later, she stated on 9 December 2015 via her Instagram account that she had finished the songwriting for the album and that she hoped the album would be finished sometime in 2016. On 9 August 2016, Macdonald announced via Instagram her fourth album was finished and would be released early 2017.

Macdonald said although it was two and a half years in the making, which is the longest she has ever taken with an album, she was glad to have taken the time and she feels the album has "the TLC that it deserves".

Macdonald released the new album entitled Under Stars on 17 February 2017. A video of an acoustic version of new album track "Down by the Water" was also released. She performed live on BBC Scotland's Hogmanay 2017 show where she debuted her upcoming single "Dream On".

=== 2018–2020: Woman of the World and Still Game ===
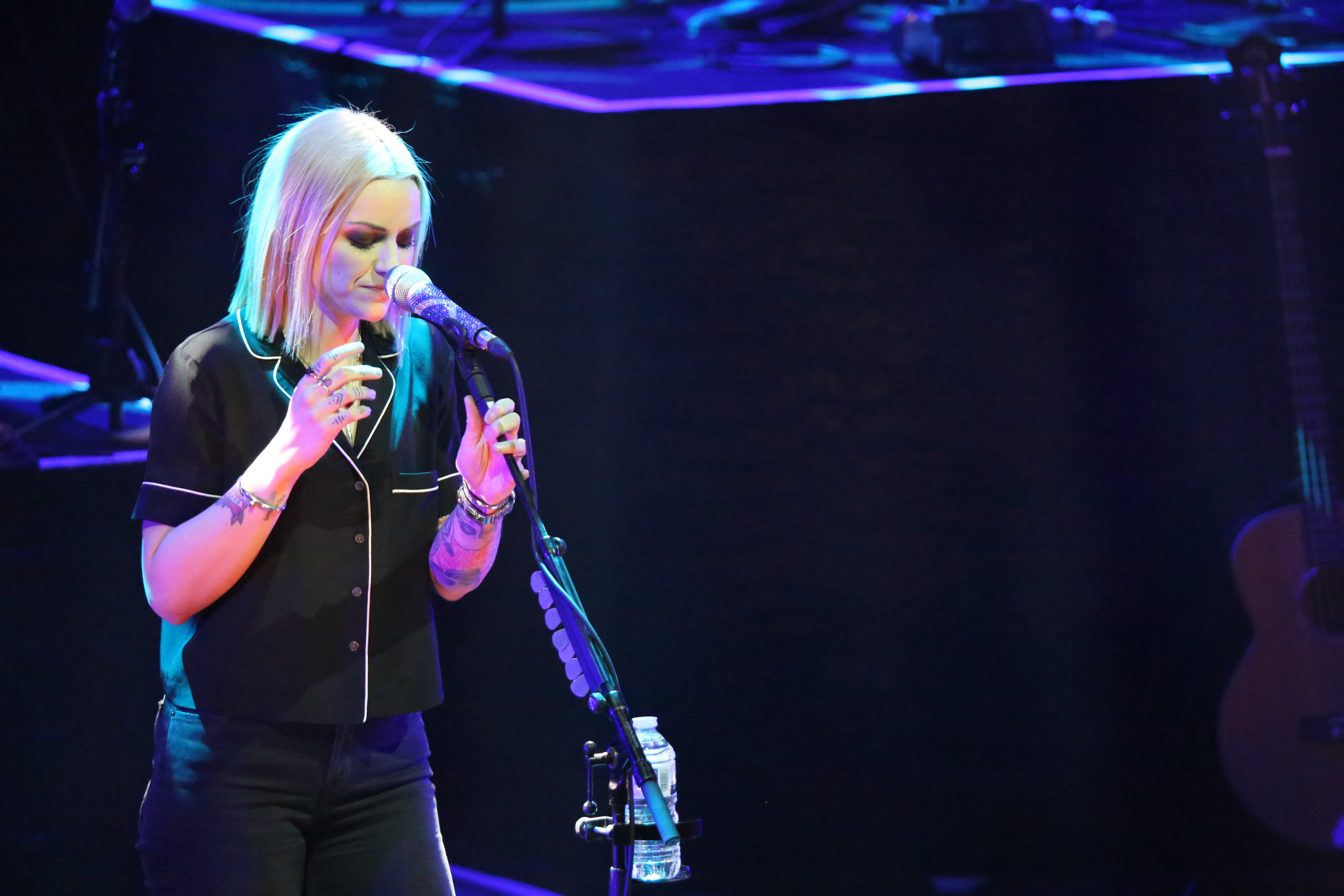
Macdonald performing during the Woman of the World tour, 2019

In September 2018, Macdonald announced her first greatest hits album, Woman of the World (The Best of 2007–2018), which includes all of her successful songs, plus a previously unreleased song, "Woman of the World". The album was released on 23 November 2018. Macdonald also announced a European tour, which she embarked on during March and April 2019. The album includes hits, like "Mr Rock & Roll" and "This Is the Life", plus two new songs, "Woman of the World" and "Come Home" from the film Patrick. Talking about the album, Macdonald said, "I remember the week of the 30th July 2007 – I released my first ever album This Is The Life, and I wasn't quite sure how I found myself in that position. My album was number 1 in countries I'd never even been to before [...] 10 years later people were still interested. I just felt that after such an incredible journey it was time to look back and feel proud of everything that has happened."

Upon release, Woman of the World achieved moderate success in continental Europe. It charted at number 46 on the UK Albums Chart, where it spent one week within the UK Top 100. In her native Scotland, it charted at number 19 on the Scottish Albums Charts, remaining in the top 100 of the Scottish Albums Charts into January 2019, spending a total of nine weeks on the chart. Elsewhere in Europe, it charted at number 19 on the Swiss Hitparade Albums Chart, spending a combined total of ten weeks on the chart, re–appearing in the top 100 at number 94 in April 2019. In Germany, it peaked at number 22, spending four weeks on the German Albums Chart, number 29 in Austria, number 93 on the Ultratop Flanders Chart and 130 on the Ultratop Wallonia Chart in Belgium.

Macdonald, a prominent fan of popular Scottish sitcom Still Game, made a cameo appearance as herself in the episode "Hitched" in the ninth and final series of Still Game, broadcast on 21 March 2019 in Scotland, and 26 July 2019 elsewhere in the United Kingdom.

=== 2020–2025: The Human Demands and Free European Song Contest ===
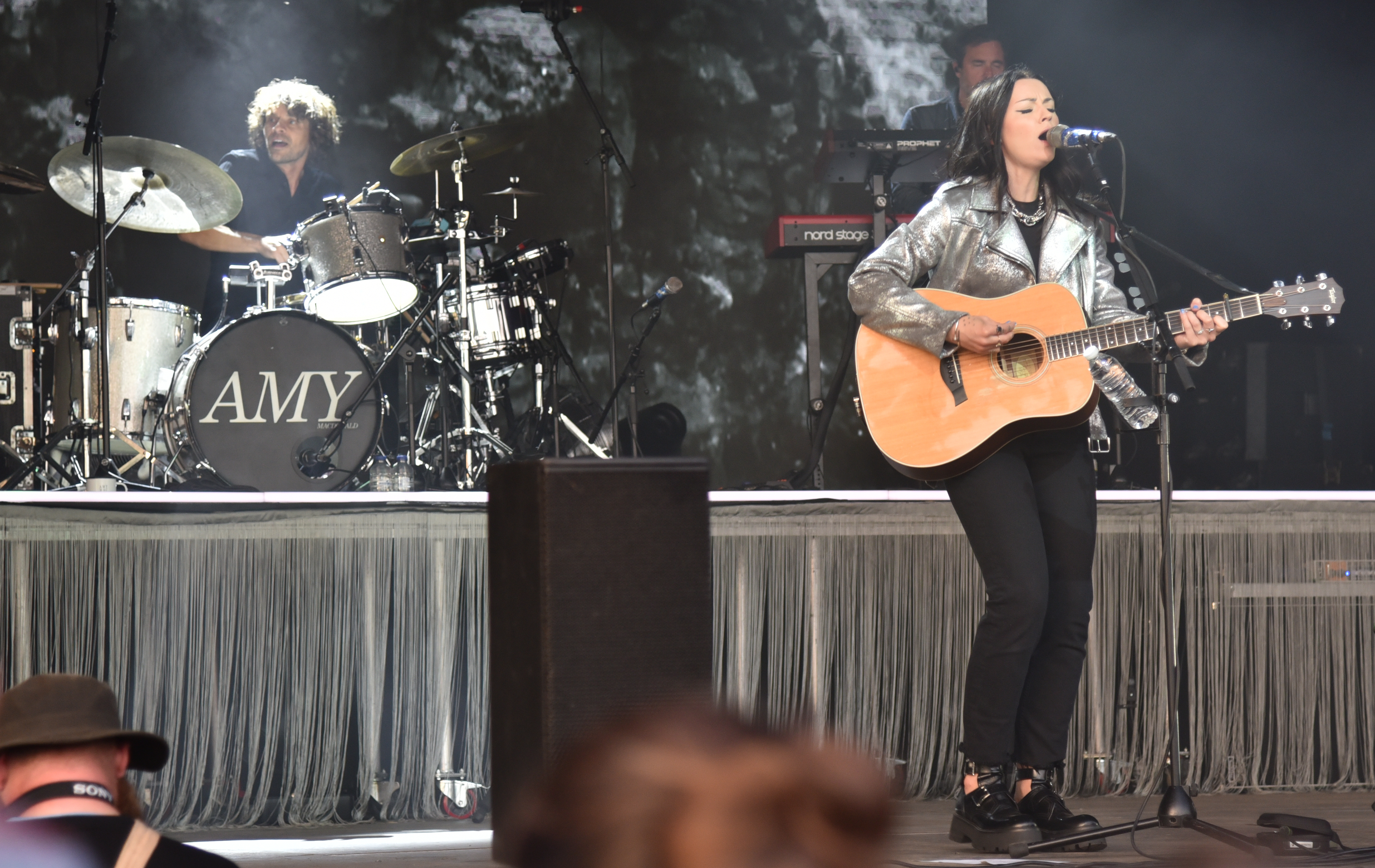
Macdonald performing "Slow It Down" in July 2022

Macdonald started writing songs between 2018 and 2019 and she started the recording of her fifth studio album in February 2020. After an interruption caused by the COVID-19 pandemic in March, she resumed recording in June 2020.

She signed a new record deal for the release of The Human Demands, with Macdonald claiming that signing a new record deal was "actually great" and that it "gave that feeling during the first album". Macdonald had been signed to the same record label since she was 18 years old and released all four of her first studio albums with the record company.

On 27 August 2020, she released the album's lead single "The Hudson" and said the release of the album The Human Demands would be on 30 October 2020. Macdonald also announced a European tour, which she will embark on between April and July 2021. Macdonald discussed the album, and performed an acoustic version of the track "We Could Be So Much More", on BBC Radio 4's Front Row in November 2020.

On 15 May 2021, she represented Scotland at the Free European Song Contest 2021, hosted in Cologne, Germany. Her song "Statues" ultimately finished in fourth place with 77 points. In July 2021, she hosted her own radio show on BBC Radio Scotland entitled Life Tracks with Amy Macdonald where she played a selection of her favourite songs, explaining what each song meant to her and why she considered it a favourite.

Ahead of her European touring schedule through the summer period of 2022, Macdonald released the extended play Don't Tell Me That It's Over on 7 July, which includes three re–recordings of previous singles "Run" (2008), "Don't Tell Me That It's Over" (2010) and "Slow It Down" (2012). Macdonald claimed that she had chosen the three songs based on fan reaction during live performances, claiming that they are "fan favourites". Macdonald recorded each of the songs for the extended play in a live performance style, based on the way she performs the songs whilst touring.

=== 2025–present: Is This What You've Been Waiting For? ===
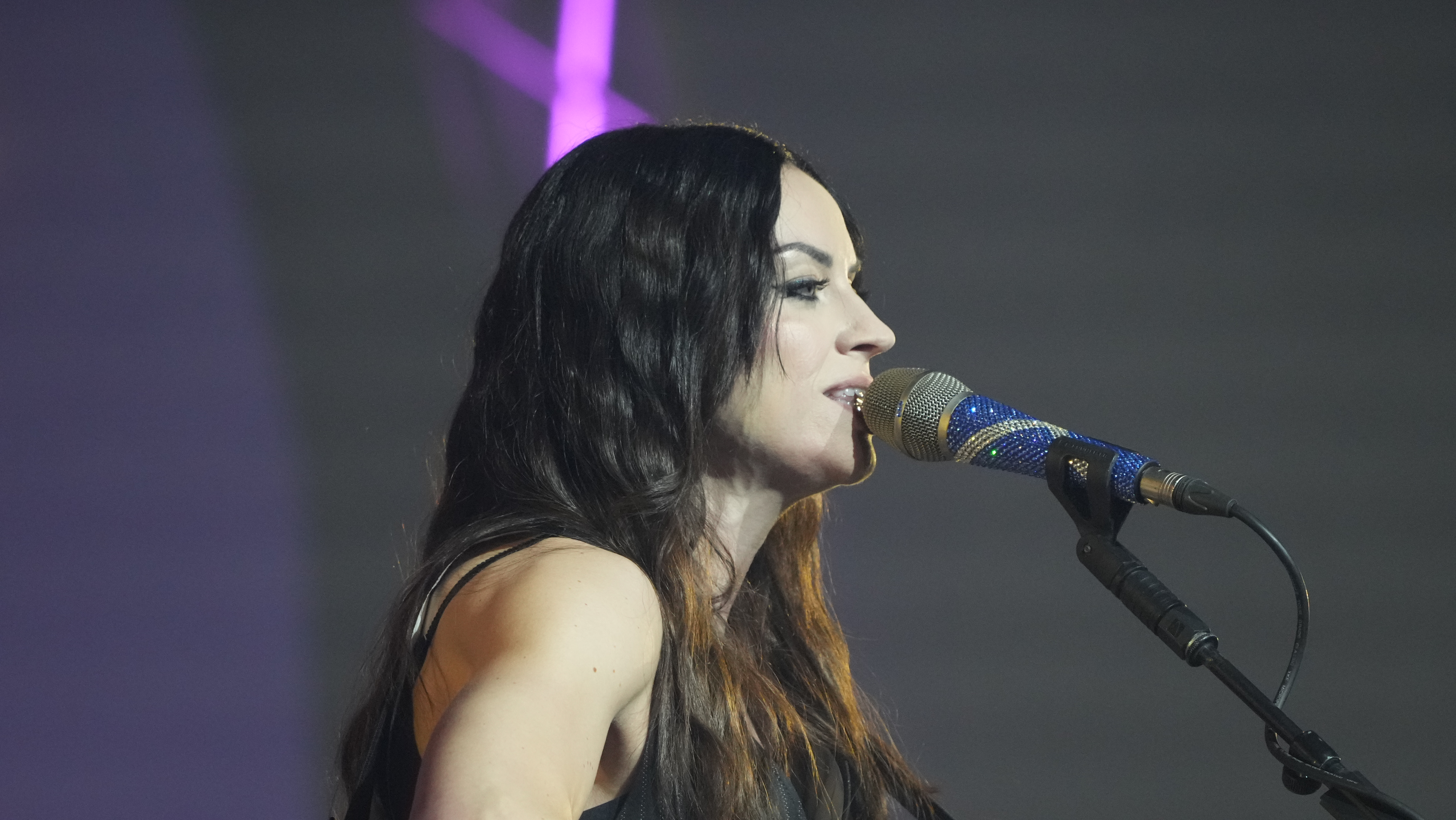
Macdonald performed at the Baloise Sessions, 2025

On 24 April 2025, BBC Radio 2 debuted Macdonald's new single, "Is This What You've Been Waiting For?", her first single release since 2021. Speaking to BBC Scotland, Macdonald claimed that hearing the new song on the radio for the first time was "strange to me because I have been doing this for 18 years and I have heard my songs played on the radio all over the world, and it still never feels normal". The same day, she announced that she would be commencing a European tour to support her upcoming album, with the tour beginning on 24 May 2025. The album, Is This What You've Been Waiting For?, was released on 11 July 2025. It debuted atop the albums charts in her native Scotland, and debuted at number eight in the United Kingdom. Additionally, it reached the top ten in Australia, Germany and Sweden.

The album won the Scottish Music Award for Best Album in 2025. Additionally, she was recipient of the Best Artist Award at the Forth Awards ceremony which took place in November 2025. In 2026, she embarked on a supporting tour across Europe, including a headline appearance at the TRNSMT festival at Glasgow Green and the Summer Sessions festival in Southampton in June.

== Artistry ==
=== Musical style and influences ===
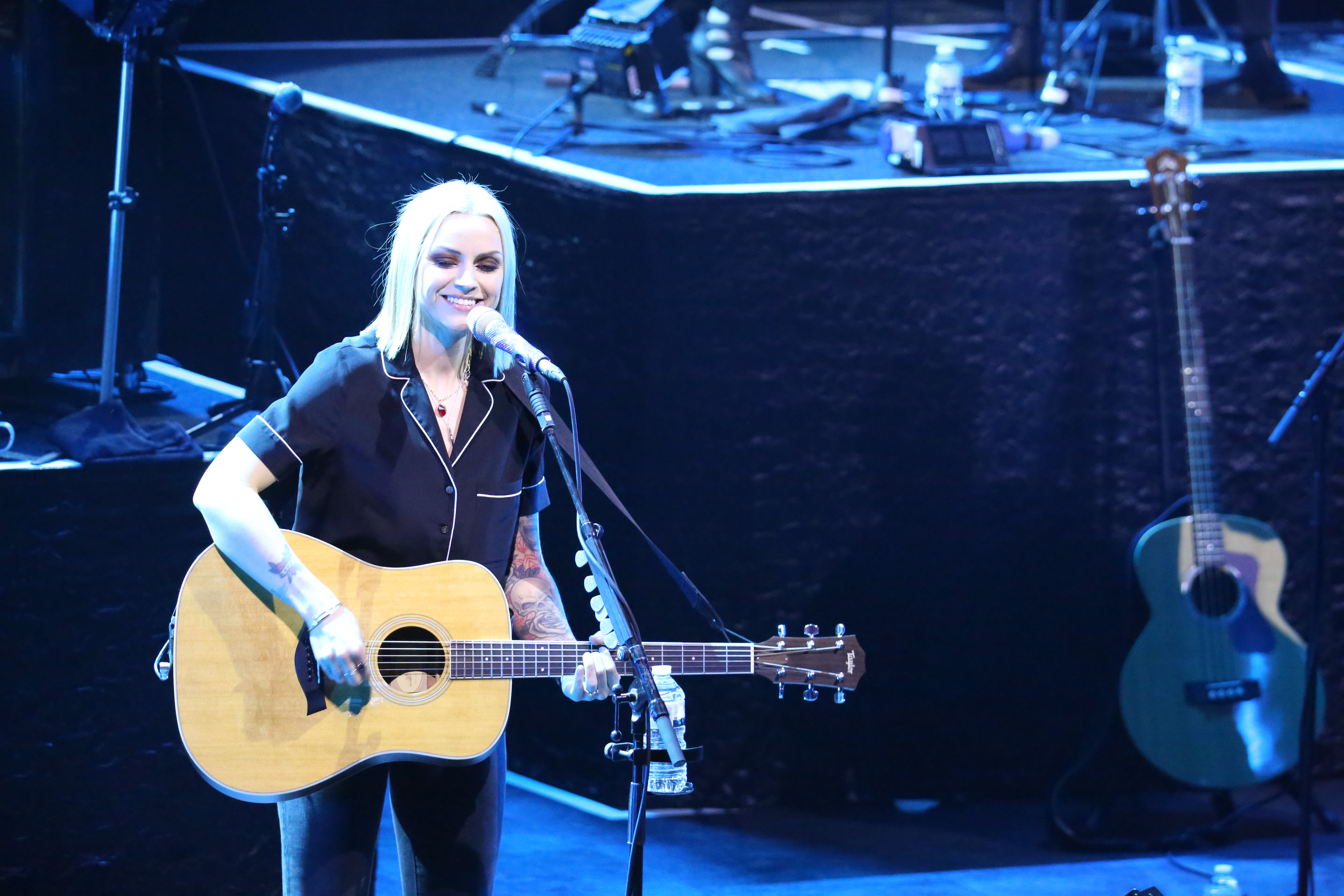
Macdonald performing with an acoustic guitar in 2019

Reviewers have described Amy as softly spoken but with a booming singing voice. Her vocal range is contralto, and blends acoustic and folk with rock and indie influences.

Macdonald cites Travis as her biggest influence. Other influences include the Killers, Rammstein, Paul Weller, The Vaccines, and Bruce Springsteen. Her 2008 single "Run" was inspired by The Killers and a gig of theirs that Macdonald had attended in Glasgow. Macdonald revealed in 2008 that she wished to collaborate with The Killers, citing lead singer Brandon Flowers as an "absolute mesmerising performer".

=== Political views ===
Macdonald has expressed concerns and scepticism about Brexit at numerous times. In 2017, she stated: "For me suddenly to be put in the position when Brexit happens to need to get visas for every single gig I do – particularly when I do most of my gigs in Europe – might be a little bit mental. Whenever my band play in Switzerland and arrive on the bus, it is a total nightmare" and she might have to leave the United Kingdom because of that and relocate to Germany if Brexit went ahead.

=== Controversies ===
In 2008, Macdonald sparked controversy over comments she made regarding Leon Jackson who had just won the fourth series of The X Factor in 2007 following Jackson cancelling a performance with Macdonald after it was reported that Jackson was suffering from tonsillitis. When asked about this, Macdonald did not speak favourably of the situation, and claimed that Jackson was "suffering from lazyitis" and not tonsillitis. In 2015, she was critical of Sandi Thom who had posted a video of herself online having a "meltdown" following BBC Radio 2's rejection of her latest single "Earthquake". Macdonald said that she thought Thom "did not go about it the right way" but claimed that she sympathised with Thom and that "a lot of what she said was probably right".

== Personal life ==
Macdonald is an avid car enthusiast, and has owned a Range Rover Vogue, an Audi R8, a Nissan GT-R and a Ferrari 458 Speciale amongst others. She is a prominent supporter of Scottish independence, claiming that "I've always been very proud of where I come from. Who knows if I'd be the same if I was from a different part of the world? I think it can also be harder for Scottish artists to break through, I don't think we always have great support. Sometimes you have to battle that little bit harder." The song "Leap of Faith" from her fourth studio album Under Stars was written about the 2014 Scottish independence referendum. About the song, Macdonald claimed that "the idea of Scotland being in control of its own affairs is something that I actually never thought I'd see in my lifetime. People fight and die for this right and all we've to do is put a little cross in a box. You know what to do Scotland."

She was engaged to footballer Steve Lovell in 2008, but did not marry. She announced in January 2016 that she was engaged to footballer Richard Foster. They married on 4 June 2018 in Las Vegas. Macdonald is a supporter of Glasgow club Rangers.

In 2015, Macdonald had an estimated fortune of £6 million.

== Discography ==
- This Is the Life (2007)
- A Curious Thing (2010)
- Life in a Beautiful Light (2012)
- Under Stars (2017)
- The Human Demands (2020)
- Is This What You've Been Waiting For? (2025)

== Filmography ==
Television appearances

Year	Title	Role	Ref.
2013	Top Gear	Herself; Episode S19: E03; Star in Reasonably Priced Car segment	
2019	Still Game	Herself; Episode: "Hitched"	
2021	Bringing in the Bells	Herself with Richard Foster	
2025	The Weakest Link	Winner; Episode S05: E02 "Battle of the Nations Special"	

Radio shows

Year	Title	Role	Ref.
2021	Life Tracks with Amy Macdonald	Presenter; BBC Radio Scotland show	
