= Don't Tell Me That It's Over =

Single by Amy Macdonald

from the album A Curious Thing
- B-side: "Town Called Malice"; "Young Lovers"
- Released: 26 February 2010 (DE); 1 March 2010 (UK)
- Recorded: 2009
- Genre: Rock, alternative rock
- Length: 3:20
- Label: Mercury
- Songwriter: Amy Macdonald
- Producer: Pete Wilkinson

Amy Macdonald singles chronology
"Poison Prince" (2009)	"Don't Tell Me That It's Over" (2010)	"Spark" (2010)

Music video
- "Don't Tell Me That It's Over" on YouTube

Alternative cover
- Alternative single release

"Don't Tell Me That It's Over" is a single released by Scottish singer-songwriter Amy Macdonald, released as the lead single from her second studio album, A Curious Thing (2010). It was released on 26 February 2010 in Germany and on 1 March 2010 in the United Kingdom via Mercury Records, and written by Macdonald and produced by Pete Wilkinson. A commercially successful release across Europe, it reached the top ten in Belgium, Germany and Austria, whilst in her native Scotland, it reached number twenty one on the official Scottish Singles Chart, and reached number forty eight in the United Kingdom. The song was later re–recorded by Macdonald, and included on her 2022 EP of the same name.

== Writing and recording ==
Macdonald began writing songs for her second album in spring 2009, in a brief break from her touring commitments. For the first time she began poring through her old notebooks, looking at song ideas, unlike her debut which consists mainly of songs that she wrote straight away. Many of the tracks were inspired by real-life personalities or events from her daily life. The tracks were recorded at Weller's BlackBarn Studios in Surrey. The song showcased a new musical style for Amy Macdonald, with a much heavier rock and less folk rock influenced sound than previous singles. It features a distorted electric guitar sound.

== Release ==
=== Promotion ===
The song was released as the lead single from Macdonald's second studio album, A Curious Thing (2010). "Don't Tell Me That It's Over" was released in two phases – 26 February 2010 in Germany and 1 March 2010 in the United Kingdom. Internationally, the song was released under the contract between Macdonald and Mercury Records.

=== Commercial response ===
Upon its release, "Don't Tell Me That It's Over" continued the European success that Macdonald had achieved with her previous single releases from her debut studio album This is the Life (2007). It performed particularly strongly in continental European markets, reaching the top ten in both the Belgium Flanders and Wallonia Singles Charts, Austria and Germany. It spent a total of 22 weeks within the Top 100 of the German Singles Charts between March–August 2010. In Austria, it spent a total of ten weeks within the Austrian Top 100 singles charts, and in the Netherlands, it peaked at number twenty nine and again spent on a total of ten weeks in the Dutch singles charts.

In Macdonald's native Scotland, the song had moderate success, peaking at number twenty one on the official Scottish Singles Charts. In the United Kingdom, it missed the top forty of the UK Singles Charts, debuting at number forty eight, spending a total of two weeks within the UK Top 100. In Spain, it debuted at number forty two before falling out of the top 100 of the Spanish Singles Charts after one week. It peaked at number sixteen in Finland, and spent a total of seven weeks on that chart.

As of March 2024, "Don't Tell Me That It's Over" has been streamed over 10 million times on streaming service Spotify.

=== Critical reception ===
Website Digital Spy commented on the song saying: "'Don't Tell Me That It's Over' is a glossier, rockier effort laced with strings that wouldn't shame a stadium-filler from Take That or Coldplay. As ever though, it's Macdonald's knack for a proper pop chorus and that irresistible Gaelic lilt that catch your ear, and her pointed lyrics that hold it. "Tell me what I'm meant to see, why are you preaching at me?" she asks popstars with A Worthy Cause fetish. Oh Bono, are you listening?"

== Music video ==
The music video shows Macdonald singing and playing the guitar in a kind of band room. The video also features scenes from nature and city life.

== Track listing ==
German CD single

CD single (Melodramatic Records / Mercury Records 273 309 1)
No.	Title	Length
1.	"Don't Tell Me That It's Over" (Radio edit)	3:18
2.	"A Town Called Malice" (Recorded live (Radio 2 Simon Mayo Session - as part of Radio 2's Great British songbook))	2:47

European CD single° / iTunes - EP

CD single (° Melodramatic Records / Mercury Records 273 360 6)
No.	Title	Length
1.	"Don't Tell Me That It's Over" (Radio edit)	3:18
2.	"Young Lovers"	3:22
3.	"Rock 'n' Roll Star (Acoustic)" (Oasis - Cover Version; recorded @ The Engine Room, London)	2:22
4.	"Don't Tell Me That It's Over (videoclip)"

UK CD single

CD single
No.	Title	Length
1.	"Don't Tell Me That It's Over" (Radio edit)	3:16

== Chart performance ==
=== Weekly charts ===
Chart (2010)	Peak position
Austria (Ö3 Austria Top 40)	10
Belgium (Ultratop 50 Flanders)	7
Belgium (Ultratop 50 Wallonia)	2
Finland (Suomen virallinen lista)	16
Germany (GfK)	6
Netherlands (Dutch Top 40)	29
Netherlands (Single Top 100)	29
Spain (Promusicae)	42
UK Singles (The Official Charts Company)	48
Scottish Singles (The Official Charts Company)	21

=== Year-end charts ===
Chart (2010)	Position
Austria (Ö3 Austria Top 40)	65
Belgium (Ultratop Flanders)	48
Belgium (Ultratop Wallonia)	32
Germany (Media Control AG)	73
Switzerland (Media Control AG)	70

== Certifications ==
Region	Certification	Certified units/sales
Switzerland (IFPI Switzerland)	Gold	15,000^{^}
^{*} Sales figures based on certification alone.^{‡} Sales+streaming figures based on certification alone.

== Credits ==
- Written-By, Vocals, Guitar - Amy Macdonald
- Mixed By - Bob Clearmountain
- Producer, Arranged By - Pete Wilkinson
- Backing Vocals - Sarah Erasmus
- Bass Guitar - Ben Sargeant
- Cello - Ann Lines
- Drums - Adam Falkner
- Electric Guitar - Jolyon Dixon
- Engineer [Balance] - Jo Miflin
- Engineer [Mastering] - Dick Beetham
- Engineer [Pro-tools] - Mo Hausler
- Executive Producer - Paul Adam
- Guitar - Mark Kulke
- Keyboards - Shannon Harris
- Mixed By - Danton Supple
- Photography - Nicky Emmerson
- Producer - Paul Long
- Producer [Additional], Engineer - Joe Fields
- Producer, Arranged By, Arranged By [Strings], Arranged By [Keyboards], Arranged By [Piano] - Pete Wilkinson
- Viola - Peter Lale (tracks: 1), Susan Dench
- Violin - Chris Tumbling, Jonathan Hill, Laura Melhuish, Leo Payne
- Vocals, Acoustic Guitar - Amy Macdonald
- Written-By - Amy Macdonald, Paul Weller
