= Music of Scotland =

Scotland is internationally known for its traditional music, often known as Scottish folk music, which remained vibrant throughout the 20th century and into the 21st when many traditional forms worldwide lost popularity to pop music. Traditional Scottish music comprises a variety of different styles such as ballads, reels, jigs and airs. Traditional Scottish music is closely associated with the bagpipes which is credited as having a prominent role in traditional music originating from the country. The bagpipes are considered an "iconic Scottish instrument" with a history dating back to the 15th century. Other notable Scottish instruments include the tin whistle, the accordion and the fiddle.

The origins of Scottish music are said to have originated over 2,300 years ago following the discovery of Western Europe's first known stringed instrument which was a "lyre-like artefact", which was discovered on the Isle of Skye. The earliest known traces of published Scottish music dates from 1662. John Forbes of Aberdeen published the earliest printed collection of music in Scotland which ultimately became recognised as the first known published collection featuring traditional Scottish songs. Modern contemporary Scottish musicians within popular genres of rock, pop, and dance include Chris Connelly (musician), Calvin Harris, Paolo Nutini, Amy Macdonald, Lewis Capaldi, Shirley Manson, Lulu, Sheena Easton, Susan Boyle, KT Tunstall, Emeli Sande, and Nina Nesbitt. Successful bands originating from Scotland include Travis, Texas, Simple Minds, the Bay City Rollers, the Jesus and Mary Chain, the Fratellis, Glasvegas and the Cocteau Twins.

Music in Scotland is celebrated and recognised in a variety of different methods such as music festivals and award ceremonies. The country's major music festival, TRNSMT replaced the former T in the Park, and is held annually in July in Glasgow Green. Other music festivals include Celtic Connections, Eden Festival, Glasgow Summer Sessions, the Skye Live Festival and the Royal Edinburgh Military Tattoo. Scottish music is celebrated through awards such as the Scottish Album of the Year Award, the Scots Trad Music Awards, the Scottish Alternative Music Awards and the Scottish Music Awards.

== Early music ==
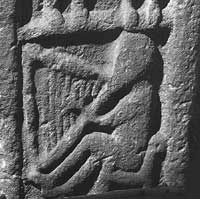
The harper on the Monifeith Pictish Stone, 700 – 900 AD

Stringed instruments have been known in Scotland since at least the Iron Age. The first evidence of lyres was found in the Greco-Roman period on the Isle of Skye (dating from 2300 BCE), making it Europe's oldest surviving stringed instrument. Bards acted as musicians but also as poets, storytellers, historians, genealogists, and lawyers, relying on an oral tradition that stretched back generations in Scotland as well as Wales and Ireland. Often accompanying themselves on the harp, they can be seen in records of Scottish courts throughout the medieval period. Scottish church music from the later Middle Ages was increasingly influenced by continental developments, with figures like the 13th-century musical theorist Simon Tailler studying in Paris before returning to Scotland, where he introduced several reforms of church music. Scottish collections of music, like the 13th-century "Wolfenbüttel 677", which is associated with St Andrews, contain mostly French compositions but with some distinctive local styles. The captivity of James I in England from 1406 to 1423, where he earned a reputation as a poet and composer, may have led him to bring English and continental styles and musicians back to the Scottish court on his release. In the late 15th century, a series of Scottish musicians trained in the Netherlands before returning home, including John Broune, Thomas Inglis and John Fety. The latter became master of the song school in Aberdeen and then Edinburgh, introducing the new five-fingered organ playing technique.

In 1501 James IV re-founded the Chapel Royal within Stirling Castle with a new and enlarged choir and it became the focus of Scottish liturgical music. Burgundian and English influences were probably reinforced when Henry VII's daughter Margaret Tudor married James IV in 1503. James V (1512–42) was a major patron of music. A talented lute player, he introduced French chansons and consorts of viols to his court and was patron to composers such as David Peebles (c. 1510–1579?).

The Scottish Reformation, directly influenced by Calvinism, was generally opposed to church music, leading to the removal of organs and a growing emphasis on metrical psalms, including a setting by David Peebles commissioned by James Stewart, 1st Earl of Moray. The most important work in Scottish reformed music was probably A Form of Prayers, published in Edinburgh in 1564. The return in 1561 from France of James V's daughter Mary, Queen of Scots, renewed the Scottish court as a centre of musical patronage and performance. The Queen played the lute and virginals and, unlike her father, was a fine singer. She brought many influences from the French court where she had been educated, employing lutenists and viola players in her household. Mary's position as a Catholic gave a new lease of life to the choir of the Scottish Chapel Royal in her reign, but the destruction of Scottish church organs meant that instrumentation to accompany the mass had to employ bands of musicians with trumpets, drums, fifes, bagpipes and tabors.

The outstanding Scottish composer of the era was Robert Carver (c. 1485–c. 1570) whose works included the nineteen-part motet 'O Bone Jesu'. James VI, King of Scotland from 1567, was a major patron of the arts in general. He rebuilt the Chapel Royal at Stirling in 1594, and the choir was used for state occasions like the baptism of his son Henry. He followed the tradition of employing lutenists for his private entertainment, as did other members of his family. When he came south to take the throne of England in 1603 as James I, he removed one of the major sources of patronage in Scotland. The Scottish Chapel Royal was now used only for occasional state visits, as when Charles I returned in 1633 to be crowned, bringing many musicians from the English Chapel Royal for the service, it began to fall into disrepair. From now on the court in Westminster would be the only major source of royal musical patronage.

== Folk music ==
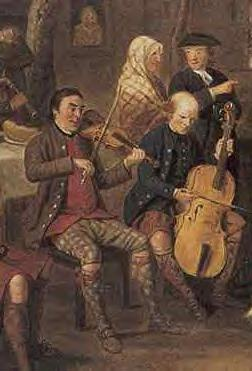
A detail from The Highland Wedding by David Allan, 1780

There is evidence that there was a flourishing culture of popular music in Scotland during the late Middle Ages, but the only song with a melody to survive from this period is the Pleugh Song. After the Reformation, the secular popular tradition of music continued, despite attempts by the Kirk, particularly in the Lowlands, to suppress dancing and events like penny weddings. This period saw the creation of the ceòl mór (the great music) of the bagpipe, which reflected its martial origins with battle tunes, marches, gatherings, salutes, and laments. The Highlands in the early seventeenth century saw the development of piping families, including the MacCrimmonds, MacArthurs, MacGregors and Mackays of Gairloch. There is also evidence of the adoption of the fiddle in the Highlands, with Martin Martin noting in his A Description of the Western Isles of Scotland (1703) that he knew of 18 players in Lewis alone. Well-known musicians included the fiddler Pattie Birnie and the piper Habbie Simpson. This tradition continued into the nineteenth century, with major figures such as the fiddlers Niel and Nathaniel Gow. There is evidence of ballads from this period. Some may date back to the late Medieval era and deal with events and people that can be traced back as far as the thirteenth century. They remained an oral tradition until they were collected as folk songs in the eighteenth century.

The earliest printed collection of secular music comes from the seventeenth century. Song collecting began to gain momentum in the early eighteenth century, and as the Kirk's opposition to music waned, there was a flood of publications, including Allan Ramsay's verse compendium The Tea Table Miscellany (1723) and The Scots Musical Museum (1787–1803) by James Johnson and Robert Burns. In the late nineteenth century, there was renewed interest in traditional music, which was more academic and political in intent. In Scotland collectors included the Reverend James Duncan and Gavin Greig. Major performers included James Scott Skinner. This revival began to have a major impact on classical music, with the development of what was in effect a national school of orchestral and operatic music in Scotland, with composers that included Alexander Mackenzie, William Wallace, Learmont Drysdale, Hamish MacCunn and John McEwen.

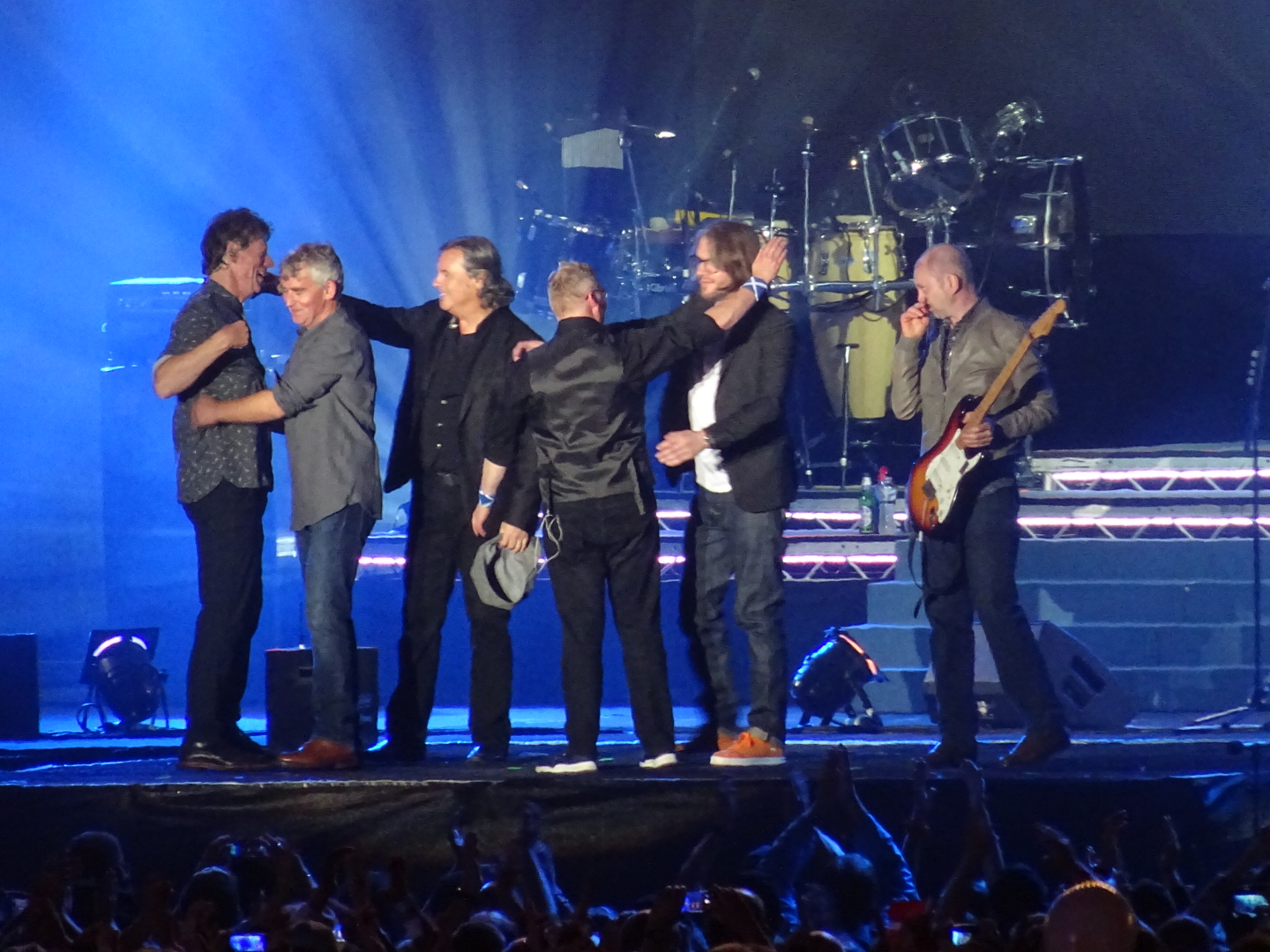
The folk band Runrig sang mostly in Scottish Gaelic and found commercial success in mainland Europe.

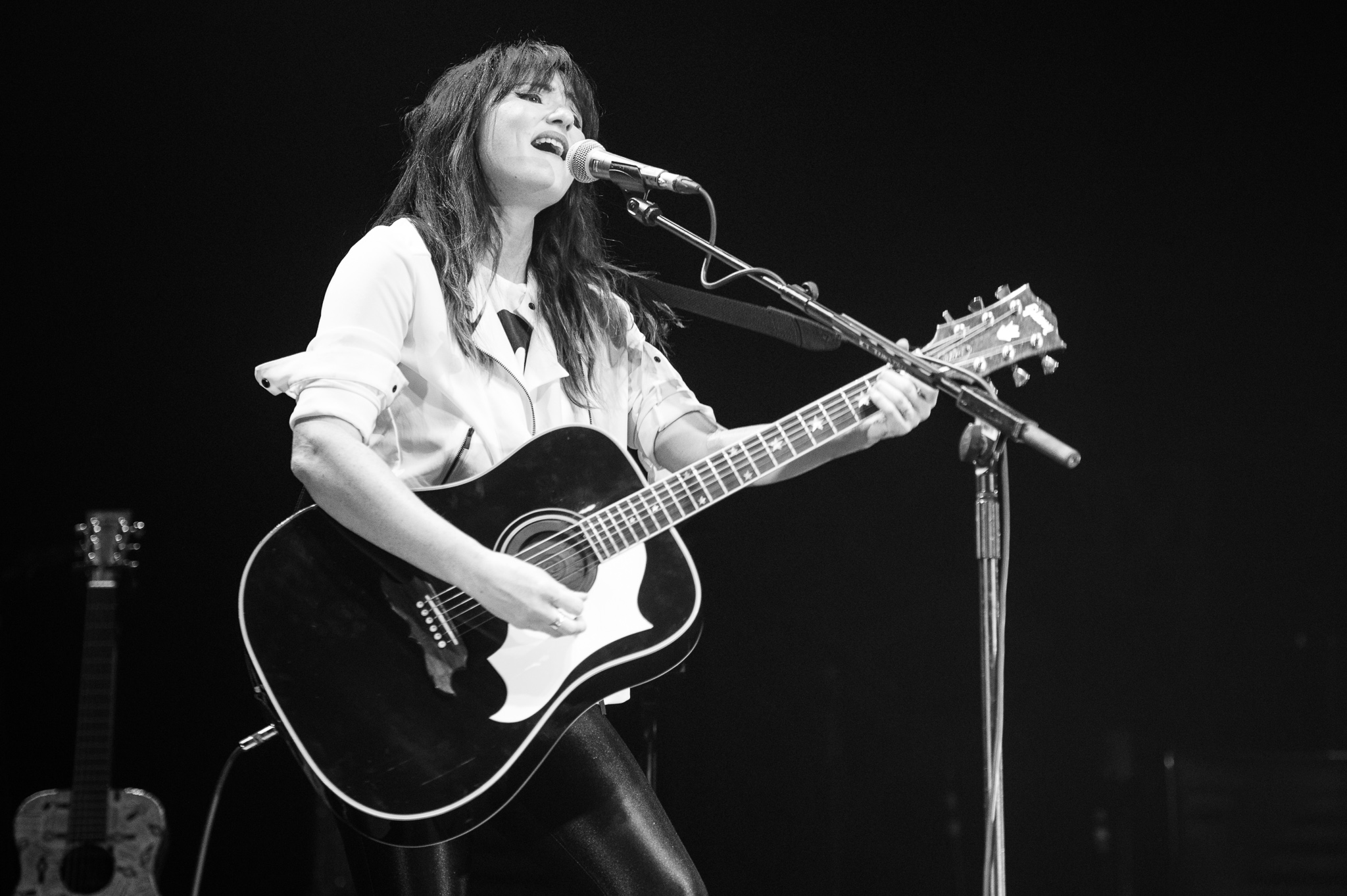
KT Tunstall has incorporated folk music with rock, earning her international success through the 2000s–2020s.

After World War II, traditional music in Scotland was marginalized but remained a living tradition. This marginal status was changed by individuals including Alan Lomax, Hamish Henderson and Peter Kennedy through collecting, publications, recordings, and radio programmes. Acts that were popularised included John Strachan, Jimmy MacBeath, Jeannie Robertson and Flora MacNeil. In the 1960s, there was a flourishing folk club culture and Ewan MacColl emerged as a leading figure in the revival in Britain. They hosted traditional performers, including Donald Higgins and the Stewarts of Blairgowrie, alongside English performers and new Scottish revivalists such as Robin Hall, Jimmie Macgregor, The Corries and the Ian Campbell Folk Group. There was also a strand of popular Scottish music that benefited from the arrival of radio and television, which relied on images of Scottishness derived from tartanry and stereotypes employed in music hall and variety. This was exemplified by the TV programme The White Heather Club which ran from 1958 to 1967, hosted by Andy Stewart and starring Moira Anderson and Kenneth McKellar.

The fusing of various styles of American music with British folk created a distinctive form of fingerstyle guitar playing known as folk baroque, pioneered by figures including Davey Graham and Bert Jansch. Others such as Donovan and The Incredible String Band abandoned the traditional element and have been seen as developing psychedelic folk. Acoustic groups who continued to interpret traditional material through into the 1970s included The Tannahill Weavers, Ossian, Silly Wizard, The Boys of the Lough, Battlefield Band, The Clutha and the Whistlebinkies.

Celtic rock developed as a variant of British folk rock by Scottish groups including the JSD Band and Spencer's Feat. Five Hand Reel, who combined Irish and Scottish personnel, emerged as the most successful exponents of the style. From the late 1970s on, the attendance at and numbers of folk clubs began to decrease as new musical and social trends began to dominate. However, in Scotland, the circuit of ceilidhs and festivals helped sustain traditional music. Two of the most successful groups of the 1980s that emerged from this dance band circuit were Runrig and Capercaillie. "An Ubhal as Àirde (The Highest Apple)" by Runrig made history by becoming the first song to be sung in Scottish Gaelic to chart on the UK Singles Charts, peaking at number eighteen on the UK Singles Charts. It also became a top five single for the band in Scotland, debuting at number three on the Scottish Singles Charts. At the height of their success during the 1980s and 1990s, Runrig were described by Billboard as one of the "most celebrated" Gaelic language bands in Scotland.

A by-product of the Celtic Diaspora was the existence of large communities across the world that looked for their cultural roots and identity to their origins in the Celtic nations. From the US, this includes Scottish bands Seven Nations, Prydein and Flatfoot 56. From Canada are bands such as Enter the Haggis, Great Big Sea, The Real McKenzies and Spirit of the West. Since the early 2000s, Scotland has experienced a growing wave of small acoustic folk duos and instrumental groups blending traditional dance tunes with modern arrangements. This period has seen increased festival activity, independent album releases, and rising international interest in Scottish acoustic folk music.

== Classical music ==
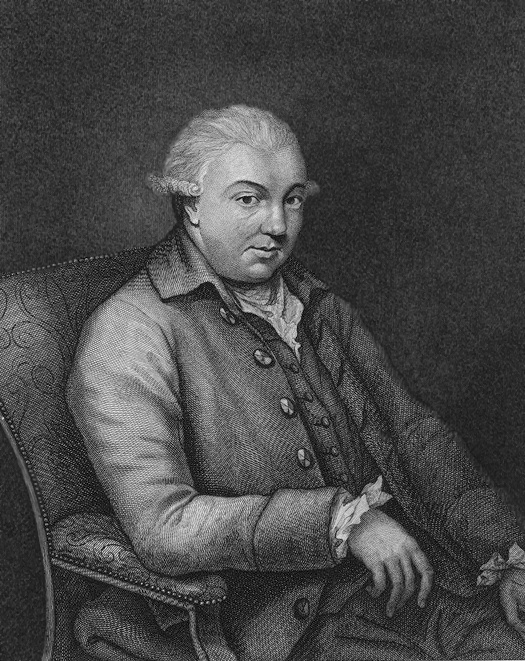
Thomas Erskine, 6th Earl of Kellie, the first Scot known to have produced a symphony

The development of a distinct tradition of art music in Scotland was limited by the impact of the Scottish Reformation on ecclesiastical music from the sixteenth century. Concerts, largely composed of "Scottish airs", developed in the seventeenth century and classical instruments were introduced to the country. Music in Edinburgh prospered through the patronage of figures including the merchant Sir John Clerk of Penicuik. The Italian style of classical music was probably first brought to Scotland by the cellist and composer Lorenzo Bocchi, who travelled to Scotland in the 1720s. The Musical Society of Edinburgh was incorporated in 1728. Several Italian musicians were active in the capital in this period and there are several known Scottish composers in the classical style, including Thomas Erskine, 6th Earl of Kellie, the first Scot known to have produced a symphony.

In the mid-eighteenth century, a group of Scottish composers including James Oswald and William McGibbon created the "Scots drawing room style", taking primarily Lowland Scottish tunes and making them acceptable to a middle-class audience. In the 1790s Robert Burns embarked on an attempt to produce a corpus of Scottish national songs, contributing about a third of the songs of The Scots Musical Museum. Burns also collaborated with George Thomson in A Select Collection of Original Scottish Airs, which adapted Scottish folk songs with "classical" arrangements. However, Burns' championing of Scottish music may have prevented the establishment of a tradition of European concert music in Scotland, which faltered towards the end of the eighteenth century.

From the mid-nineteenth century, classical music began a revival in Scotland, aided by the visits of Frédéric Chopin and Felix Mendelssohn in the 1840s. By the late nineteenth century, there was in effect a national school of orchestral and operatic music in Scotland, with major composers including Alexander Mackenzie, William Wallace, Learmont Drysdale and Hamish MacCunn. Major performers included the pianist Frederic Lamond and the singers Mary Garden and Joseph Hislop.

After the First World War, Robin Orr and Cedric Thorpe Davie were influenced by modernism and Scottish musical cadences. Erik Chisholm founded the Scottish Ballet Society and helped to create several ballets. The Edinburgh Festival was founded in 1947 and led to an expansion of classical music in Scotland, leading to the foundation of Scottish Opera in 1960. Important post-war composers included Ronald Stevenson, Francis George Scott, Edward McGuire, William Sweeney, Iain Hamilton, Thomas Wilson, Thea Musgrave, Judith Weir, James MacMillan and Helen Grime. Craig Armstrong has produced music for numerous films. Major performers include the percussionist Evelyn Glennie. Major Scottish orchestras include the Royal Scottish National Orchestra (RSNO), the Scottish Chamber Orchestra (SCO) and the BBC Scottish Symphony Orchestra (BBC SSO). Major venues include Glasgow Royal Concert Hall, Usher Hall in Edinburgh and Queen's Hall, Edinburgh.

== Contemporary modern music ==
=== 1950s–1960s ===
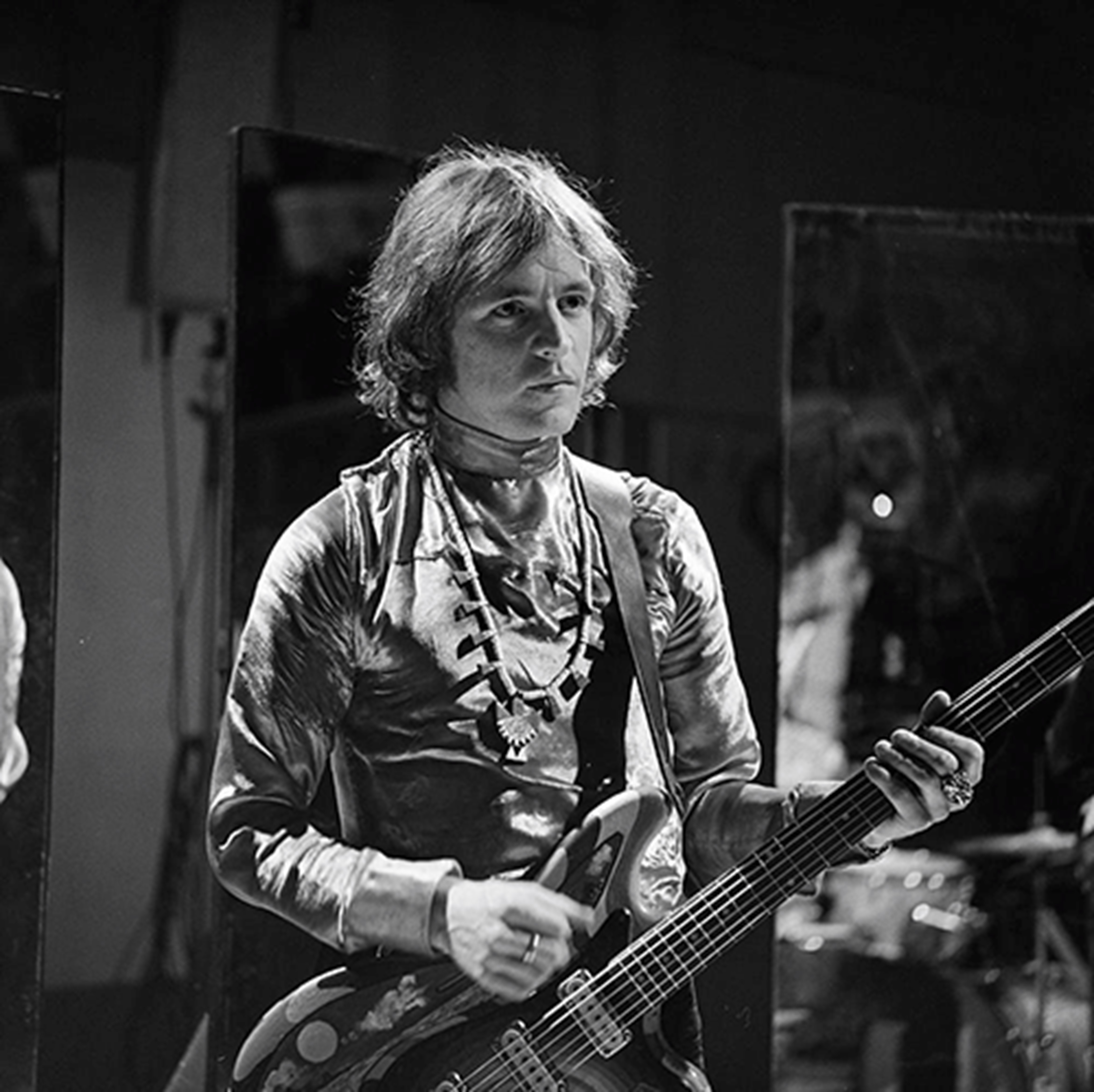
Jack Bruce performing in 1968

Scotland produced few rock or pop bands of note in the 1950s. During the 1960s, two innovative rock musicians from Scotland became central to the international rock scene – Donovan and Jack Bruce. Traces of Scottish literary and musical influences can be found in both Donovan's and Bruce's work. Donovan's music on 1965's Fairytale anticipated the British folk rock revival, and his musicianship is said to have pioneered psychedelic rock with Sunshine Superman in 1966. Donovan is said to be an early influence on Marc Bolan, founder of T. Rex. Jack Bruce co-founded Cream along with Eric Clapton and Ginger Baker in 1966, debuting with the album Fresh Cream. Fresh Cream and the launch of Cream are considered a pivotal moment in blues-rock history, introducing virtuosity and improvisation to the form. Bruce, as a member of The Tony Williams Lifetime (along with John McLaughlin and Larry Young) on Emergency!, similarly contributed to a seminal jazz-rock work that predated Bitches Brew by Miles Davis.

Thanks to accolades from David Bowie and others, the Edinburgh-based band 1-2-3 (later known as Clouds), active between 1966 and 1971, were acknowledged as a definitive precursor of the progressive rock movement.

=== 1970s–1980s ===
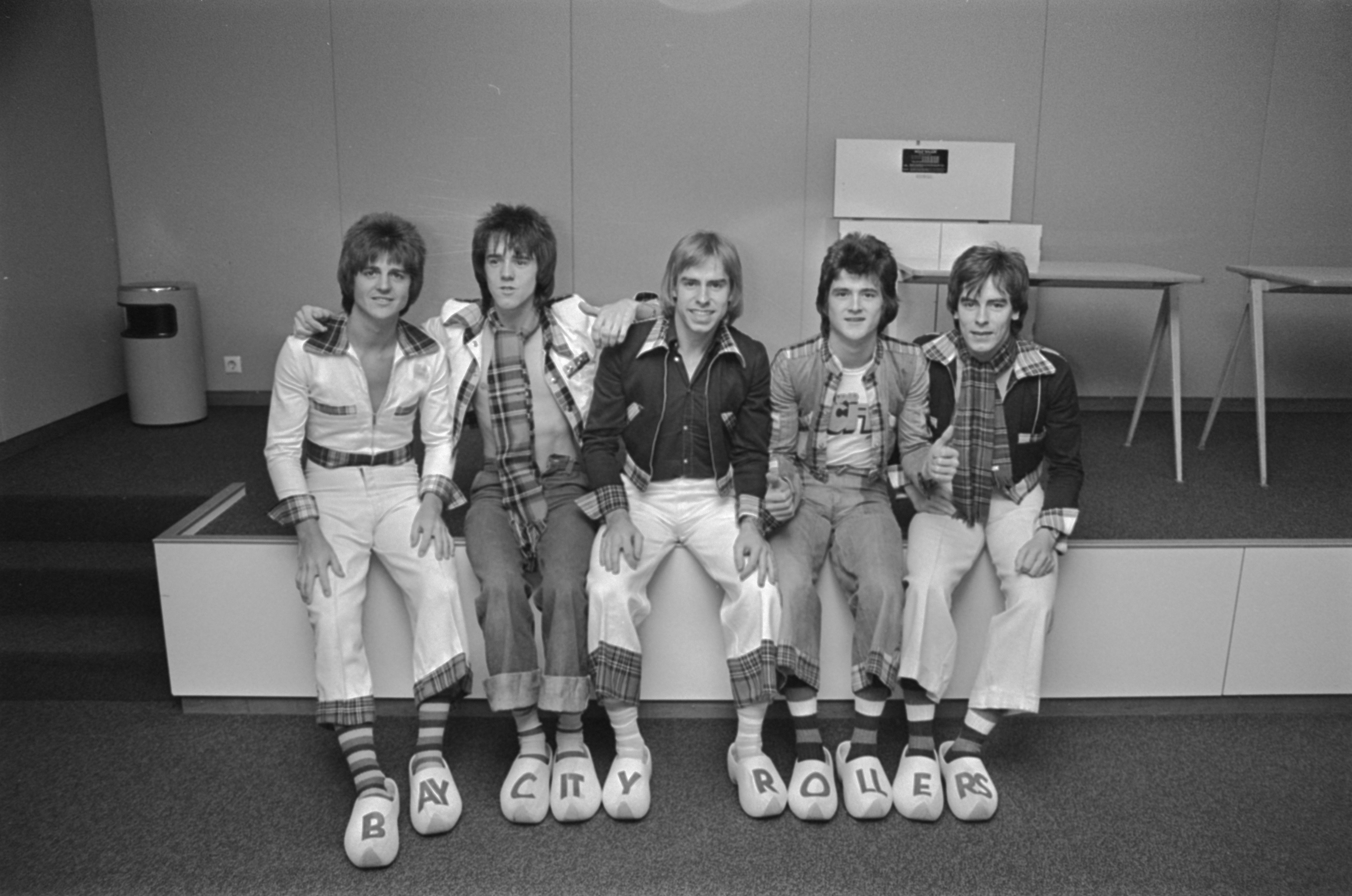
The Bay City Rollers found fame in both Europe and the United States, selling 120 million records worldwide.

By the 1970s, Rod Stewart and groups such as the Average White Band, Nazareth and the Sensational Alex Harvey Band began to gain international success. The most commercially successful Scottish pop act of the 1970s by sales was the Bay City Rollers, who sold over 120 million albums worldwide. Their 1975 single "Bye, Bye, Baby (Baby Goodbye)" finished the year as the UK's best-selling single.

Pilot, a band formed by former Bay City Rollers member Billy Lyall, also enjoyed some success. Their 1974 single "Magic" from their debut album From the Album of the Same Name (1974) reached number eleven on the UK Singles Charts and number five on the Billboard Hot 100 in the United States. Selling over one million copies, it was awarded a gold disc by the R.I.A.A. in August 1975. The song "January" gave Pilot their greatest success in the UK, securing the number one spot in the UK Singles Chart on 1 February 1975.

Several members of the internationally successful rock band AC/DC were born in Scotland, including their original lead singer, Bon Scott, and the guitarists Malcolm and Angus Young, although by the time they began playing, all three had moved to Australia. Angus and Malcolm's older brother, George Young, found success as a member of the Australian band the Easybeats and later produced some of AC/DC's records and formed a songwriting partnership with the Dutch expatriate Harry Vanda. The musicians Mark Knopfler and John Martyn were also partly raised in Scotland.

Scotland produced a number of punk bands which achieved mainstream success, namely the Exploited, the Rezillos, the Skids, the Fire Engines and the Scars. In the post-punk era of the early 1980s, Scotland produced bands like Cocteau Twins, Orange Juice, the Associates, Simple Minds, Maggie Reilly, Annie Lennox (Eurythmics), Hue and Cry, Goodbye Mr Mackenzie, the Jesus and Mary Chain, Wet Wet Wet, Big Country, the Proclaimers and Josef K. Since the 1980s Scotland has produced several popular rock and alternative rock acts. The growth of indie bands in Scotland during the 1980s was prominent with the arrival of the likes of Primal Scream, the Soup Dragons, the Jesus and Mary Chain, Aztec Camera, the Blue Nile, Teenage Fanclub, 18 Wheeler, the Pastels and BMX Bandits. The following decade also saw a burgeoning scene in Glasgow, with the likes of the Almighty, Arab Strap, Belle and Sebastian, Camera Obscura, the Delgados, Bis and Mogwai.

=== 1990s–present ===
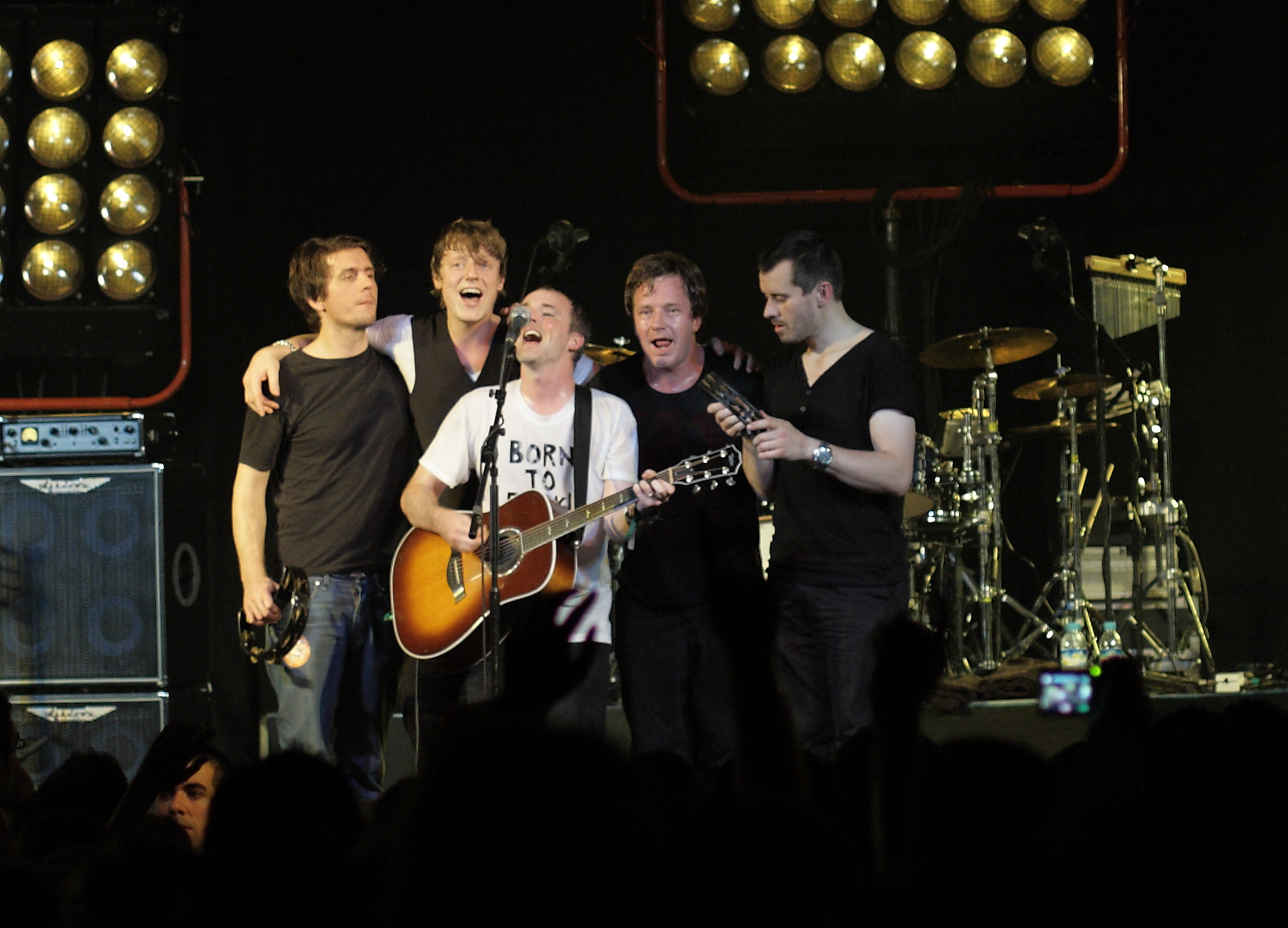
The Man Who by Travis is the best-selling album by a Scottish act in the UK.

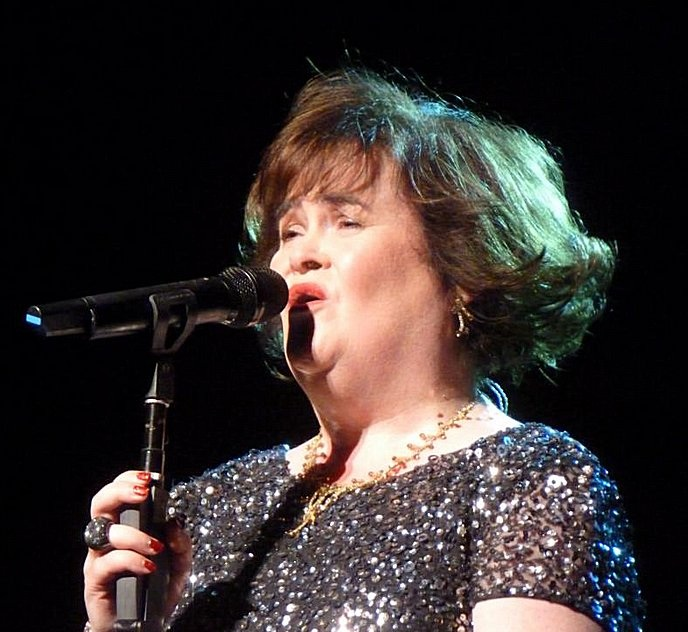
Susan Boyle's debut album was the highest-selling album internationally in 2009.

In 1990 the Scottish band Aztec Camera released a protest song against Margaret Thatcher and her government entitled "Good Morning Britain", with lyrics referencing the social unrest evident in the country during the 1980s. The late 1990s and 2000s saw Scottish guitar bands continue to achieve critical or commercial success. Examples include Franz Ferdinand, Frightened Rabbit, Biffy Clyro, Texas, Travis, KT Tunstall, Amy Macdonald, Paolo Nutini, the View, Idlewild, Shirley Manson of Garbage, Glasvegas, We Were Promised Jetpacks, the Fratellis and Twin Atlantic. Scottish extreme metal bands include Man Must Die and Cerebral Bore. The electronic music producer Calvin Harris is also Scottish. The Edinburgh-based group Young Fathers won the 2014 Mercury Prize for their album Dead. With the arrival and increasing popularity of musical talent television shows throughout the 2000s, notable Scottish acts include Michelle McManus (winner of Pop Idol, 2003), Darius Campbell Danesh (3rd, Pop Idol, 2001–2002), Leon Jackson (winner, The X Factor, 2007), Nicholas McDonald (runner-up, The X Factor, 2014) and Susan Boyle (runner-up, Britain's Got Talent, 2009).

Artists to achieve international and commercial success through the 2010s and 2020s include Calvin Harris, Susan Boyle, Lewis Capaldi, Nina Nesbitt, the Snuts, Nathan Evans, Gerry Cinnamon and Chvrches. Boyle topped both the UK Album Charts and the Billboard 200 chart in the United States, becoming the first female artist in history to have a number one album simultaneously in both the United Kingdom and the United States within the space of a year. In 2011 Boyle became the first female British artist to achieve three successive album debuts at No.1 in less than two years. Her debut album, I Dreamed a Dream (2009), is one of the best-selling albums of the 21st century, having sold over 10 million copies worldwide, and it was the best-selling album internationally in 2009. Harris currently holds the Official Charts Company record for obtaining the most top ten singles in the United Kingdom to be taken from one album. All nine singles released from his third studio album, 18 Months (2012), reached the top ten, meaning Harris surpassed the record previously held by Michael Jackson, who held the record with seven singles from one album.

=== Scotland in Eurovision ===
As one of the countries of the United Kingdom, Scotland does not compete separately in the annual Eurovision Song Contest. Edinburgh, Scotland's capital city, hosted the contest in 1972 on behalf of Monaco, the winner of the competition in 1971, after the countries participating broadcaster, Télé Monte Carlo, were unable to fulfil the requirements to host the competition and experienced difficulties in finding a suitable venue. In a similar manner, Glasgow, Scotland's largest city, was the only short–listed city to host the 2023 Eurovision Song Contest, but ultimately lost its bid to Liverpool in England. After finishing second at the 2022 contest with Sam Ryder, the United Kingdom had been invited to host the competition on behalf of Ukraine, who were unable to stage the event as a result of the Russian invasion in the country and security concerns. Glasgow previously hosted the Eurovision Dance Contest 2008 at the SEC Centre in September 2008.

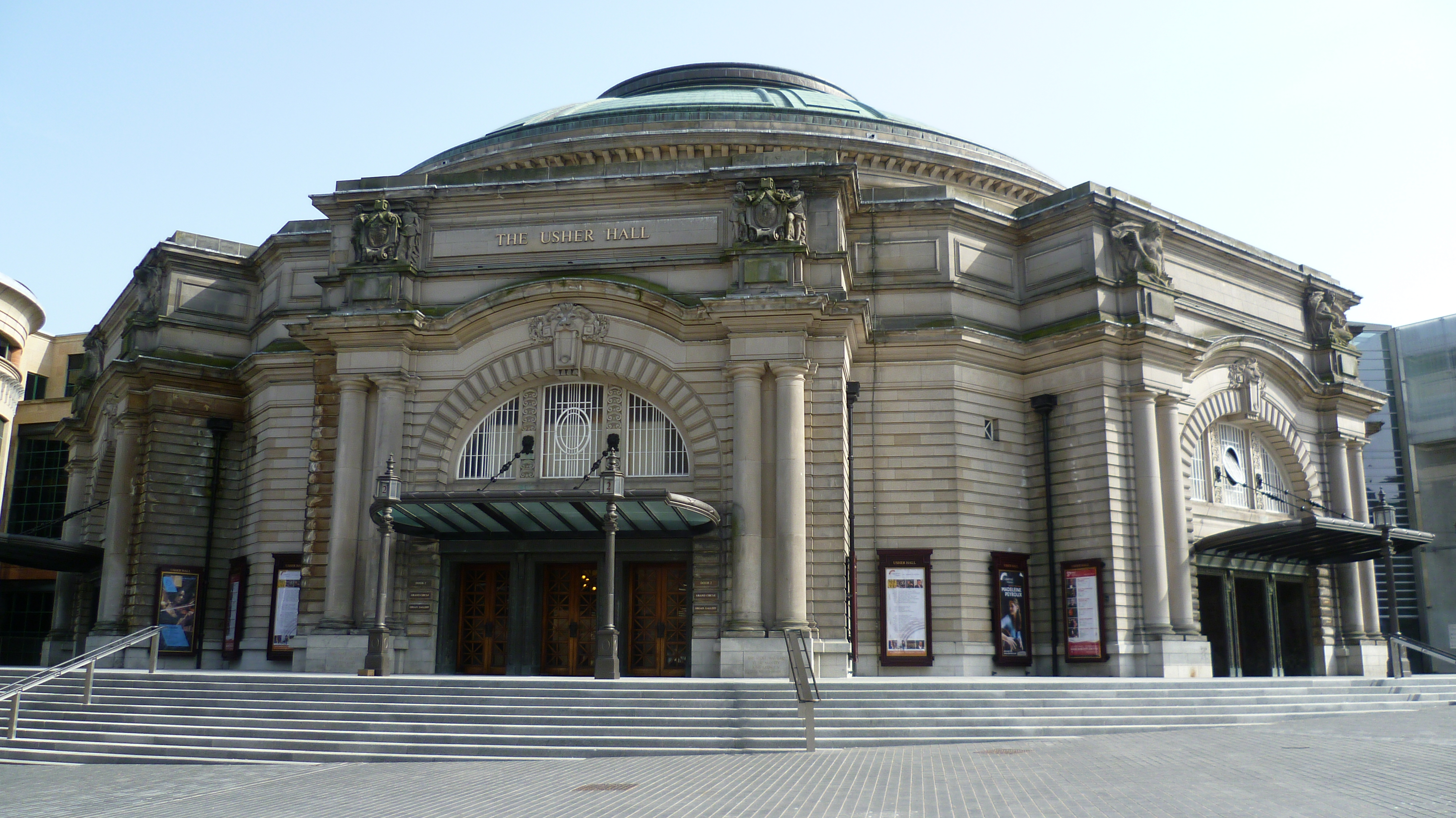
Usher Hall in Edinburgh hosted the 1972 Song Contest and the 2018 Young Musicians Contest.

In 2020 speculation had arisen about Scotland debuting at the Junior Eurovision Song Contest in a similar manner in which Wales had participated at the Junior Eurovision Song Contest 2018. A number of Scottish broadcasters – STV and BBC Alba – are eligible to submit a Scottish entry as they hold European Broadcasting Union (EBU) membership, however, BBC Alba confirmed that, despite engaging in discussion with the EBU about Scotland participating, that Scotland had no plans to enter the junior contest that year. Scottish entry to the Junior Eurovision Song Contest has since been considered a possibility in the subsequent contests, however, as of 2024, Scotland has still to formally debut at the contest.

In 2018 Edinburgh hosted the Eurovision Young Musicians 2018 contest at the Usher Hall, which had previously hosted the song contest in 1972. Scotland entered the Eurovision Choir 2019, a European Broadcasting Union competition for choral singers. This marked the first time that Scotland had entered a Eurovision or European Broadcasting Union competition separately from the United Kingdom. The choir, Alba, performed three songs in Scottish Gaelic; Cumha na Cloinne, Ach a' Mhairead and Alba. The choir competed in the first round and did not advance to the second and final round.

Scotland debuted at the second Free European Song Contest in 2021, a competition broadcast by the German broadcaster ProSieben as an alternative to the main Eurovision Song Contest which had been cancelled in 2020 due to the COVID-19 pandemic. At the first edition of the contest, Scotland had been represented as part of the wider United Kingdom. The singer Amy Macdonald represented Scotland and finished in 4th place with the song "Statues".

== Instruments ==
=== Accordion ===
The accordion has long been a part of Scottish music. Country dance bands, such as that led by Jimmy Shand, commonly use the instrument. In the early 20th century, the melodeon, a variety of diatonic button accordion was popular among rural folk and was part of the bothy band tradition. More recently, Phil Cunningham (of Silly Wizard) has helped to popularise the accordion in Scottish music.

=== Bagpipes ===
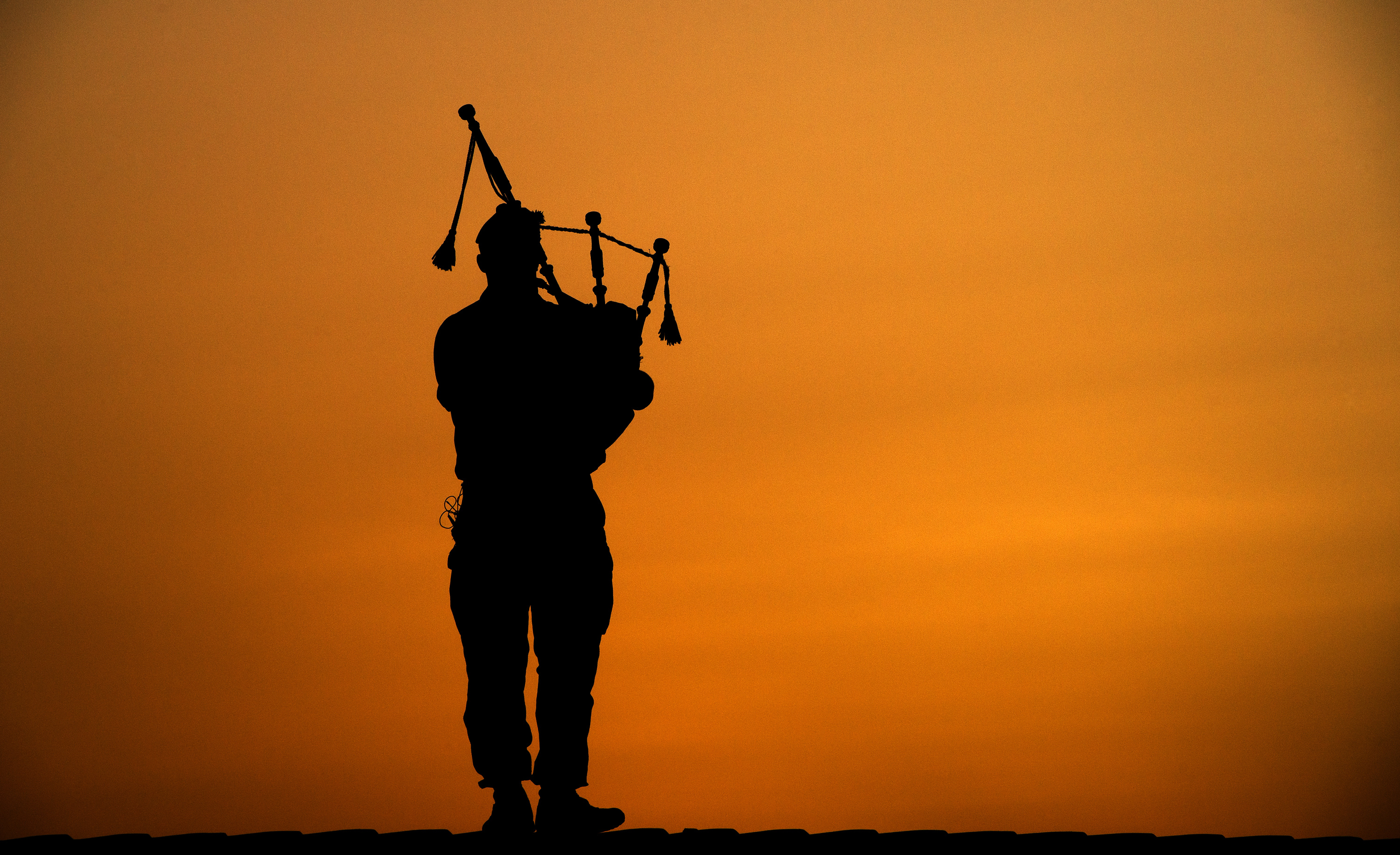
A piper with the 4 SCOTS regiment playing the bagpipes

Skye Boat Song performed by Pipe Band

Many associate Scottish folk music with the Great Highland Bagpipe, which has long played an important part in Scottish music. Although this particular form of bagpipe was developed exclusively in Scotland, it is not the only Scottish bagpipe. The earliest mention of bagpipes in Scotland dates to the 15th century although they are believed to have been introduced to Britain by the Roman armies. The pìob mhór, or Great Highland Bagpipe, was initially associated with both hereditary piping families and professional pipers to various clan chiefs; later, pipes were adopted for use in other venues, including military marching. Piping clans included the Clan Henderson, MacArthurs, MacDonalds, MacKays and, especially, the MacCrimmon, who were hereditary pipers to the Clan MacLeod.

Though bagpipes are closely associated with Scotland, the instrument (or, more precisely, family of instruments) is found throughout large swathes of Europe, North Africa and South Asia. The most common bagpipe heard in modern Scottish music is the Great Highland Bagpipe, which was spread by the Highland regiments of the British Army. Historically, numerous other bagpipes existed, and many of them have been recreated in the last half-century. Also during the 19th century bagpipes were played on ships sailing off to war to keep the men's hopes up and to bring good luck in the coming war.

The classical music of the Great Highland Bagpipe is called Pìobaireachd, which consists of a first movement called the urlar (in English, the 'ground' movement,) which establishes a theme. The theme is then developed in a series of movements, growing increasingly complex each time. After the urlar there is usually a number of variations and doublings of the variations. Then comes the taorluath movement and variation and the crunluath movement, continuing with the underlying theme. This is usually followed by a variation of the crunluath, usually the crunluath a mach (other variations: crunluath breabach and crunluath fosgailte); the piece closes with a return to the urlar.

Bagpipe competitions are common in Scotland, for both solo pipers and pipe bands. Competitive solo piping is currently popular among many aspiring pipers, some of whom travel from as far as Australia to attend Scottish competitions. Other pipers have chosen to explore more creative usages of the instrument. Different types of bagpipes have also seen a resurgence since the 70s, as the historical border pipes and Scottish smallpipes have been resuscitated and now attract a thriving alternative piping community. Two of Scotland's most highly regarded pipers are Gordon Duncan and Fred Morrison.

The pipe band is another common format for highland piping, with top competitive bands including the Victoria Police Pipe Band from Australia (formerly), Northern Ireland's Field Marshal Montgomery, the Republic of Ireland's Laurence O'Toole pipe band, Canada's 78th Fraser Highlanders Pipe Band and Simon Fraser University Pipe Band, and Scottish bands like Shotts and Dykehead Pipe Band and Strathclyde Police Pipe Band. These bands, as well as many others, compete in numerous pipe band competitions, often the World Pipe Band Championships, and sometimes perform in public concerts.

=== Fiddle ===
Scottish traditional fiddling encompasses a number of regional styles, including the bagpipe-inflected west Highlands, the upbeat and lively style of Norse-influenced Shetland Islands and the Strathspey and slow airs of the northeast. The instrument arrived late in the 17th century, and is first mentioned in 1680 in a document from Newbattle Abbey in Midlothian, Lessones For Ye Violin.

In the 18th century, Scottish fiddling is said to have reached new heights. Fiddlers like William Marshall and Niel Gow were legends across Scotland, and the first collections of fiddle tunes were published in the mid-century. The most famous and useful of these collections was a series published by Nathaniel Gow, one of Niel's sons, and a fine fiddler and composer in his own right. Captain Simon Fraser published his collection, The Airs and Melodies Peculiar to the Highlands of Scotland and The Isles, in 1816. Classical composers such as Charles McLean, James Oswald and William McGibbon used Scottish fiddling traditions in their Baroque compositions.

Scottish fiddling is most directly represented in North America on Cape Breton Island, Nova Scotia, which received some 25,000 emigrants from the Scottish Highlands during the Highland Clearances of 1780–1850. Cape Breton musicians such as Natalie MacMaster, Ashley MacIsaac, and Jerry Holland have brought their music to a worldwide audience, building on the traditions of master fiddlers such as Buddy MacMaster and Winston Scotty Fitzgerald.

Notable Scottish fiddlers include Aly Bain and Alasdair Fraser, as well as influential 20th-century players such as James Scott Skinner, Hector MacAndrew, Angus Grant and Tom Anderson.

The Annual Scots Fiddle Festival which runs each November showcases the great fiddling tradition and talent in Scotland.

=== Guitar ===
The history of the guitar in traditional music is recent, as is that of the cittern and bouzouki introduced into Celtic folk music by folksinger Johnny Moynihan in the late 1960s. The guitar featured prominently in the folk revival of the early 1960s with the likes of Archie Fisher, the Corries, Hamish Imlach, Robin Hall and Jimmie Macgregor. The virtuoso playing of Bert Jansch was widely influential, and the range of instruments was widened by The Incredible String Band. Notable artists include Tony McManus, Dave MacIsaac, Peerie Willie Johnson and Dick Gaughan. Other notable guitarists in Scottish music scene include Kris Drever of Fine Friday and Lau, and Ross Martin of Cliar, Dàimh and Harem Scarem. Scotland has also produced several notable electric guitarists, including Stuart Adamson of Big Country (once referred to as "Britain's Jimi Hendrix"), Angus Young of AC/DC, Jimmy McCulloch of Wings, Manny Charlton of Nazareth, Zal Cleminson of The Sensational Alex Harvey band, and Brian Robertson of Thin Lizzy.

=== Gittern ===
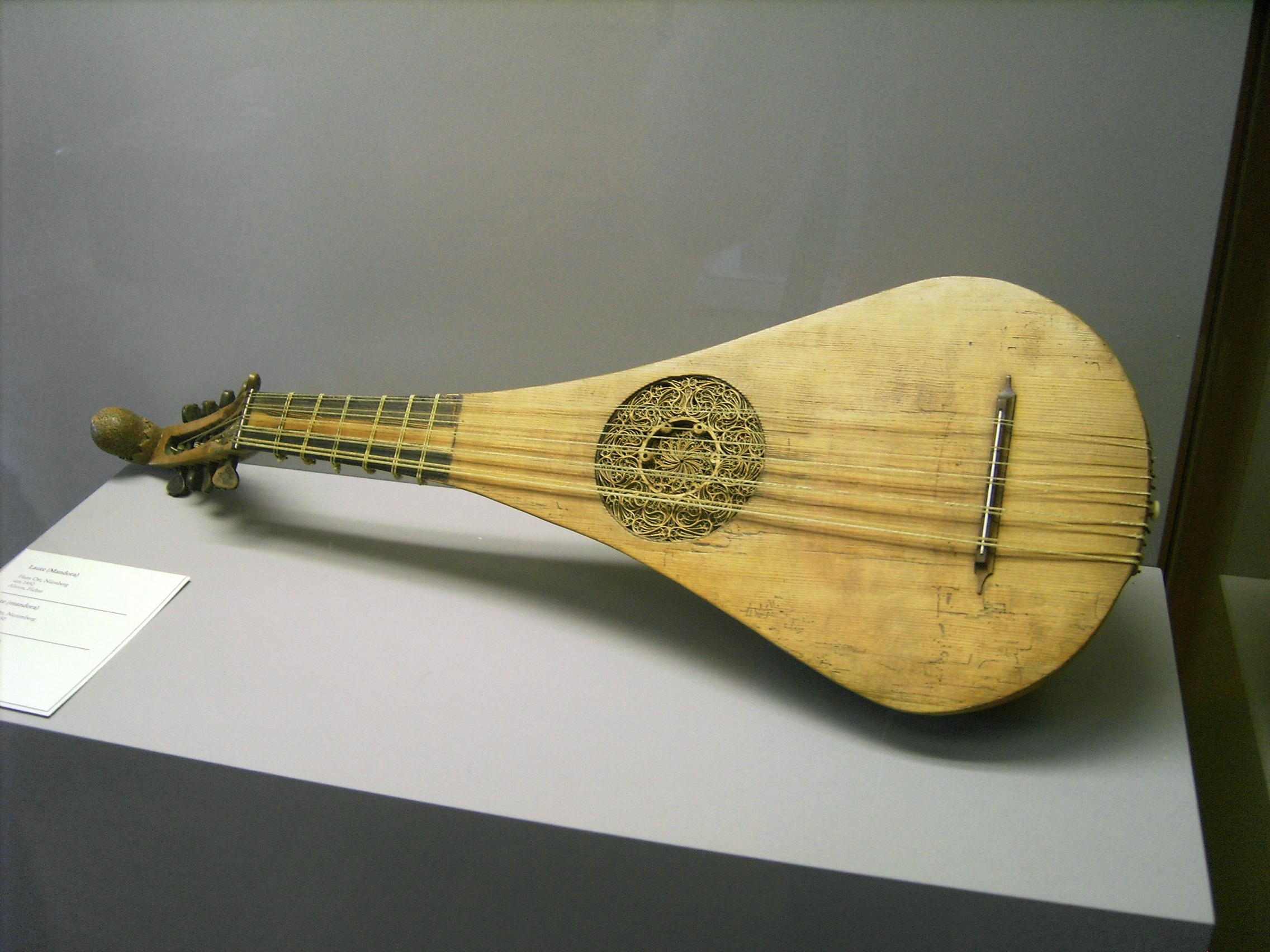
Five course Gittern or "Quintern" dated 1450, built by luthier Hans Oth

Stringed instruments similar to that of modern guitars have appeared in Scottish folk music for centuries. The Gittern, an ancestor to the modern guitar, featured in medieval Scottish appearing from at least the 13th century and was still around in Scotland 300 years later.

=== Harp ===
Material evidence suggests that lyres and / or harp, or clarsach, has a long and ancient history in Britain, with Iron Age lyres dating from 2300 BC. The harp was regarded as the national instrument until it was replaced with the Highland bagpipes in the 15th century. Stone carvings in the East of Scotland support the theory that the harp was present in Pictish Scotland well before the 9th century and may have been the original ancestor of the modern European harp and even formed the basis for Scottish pibroch, the folk bagpipe tradition.

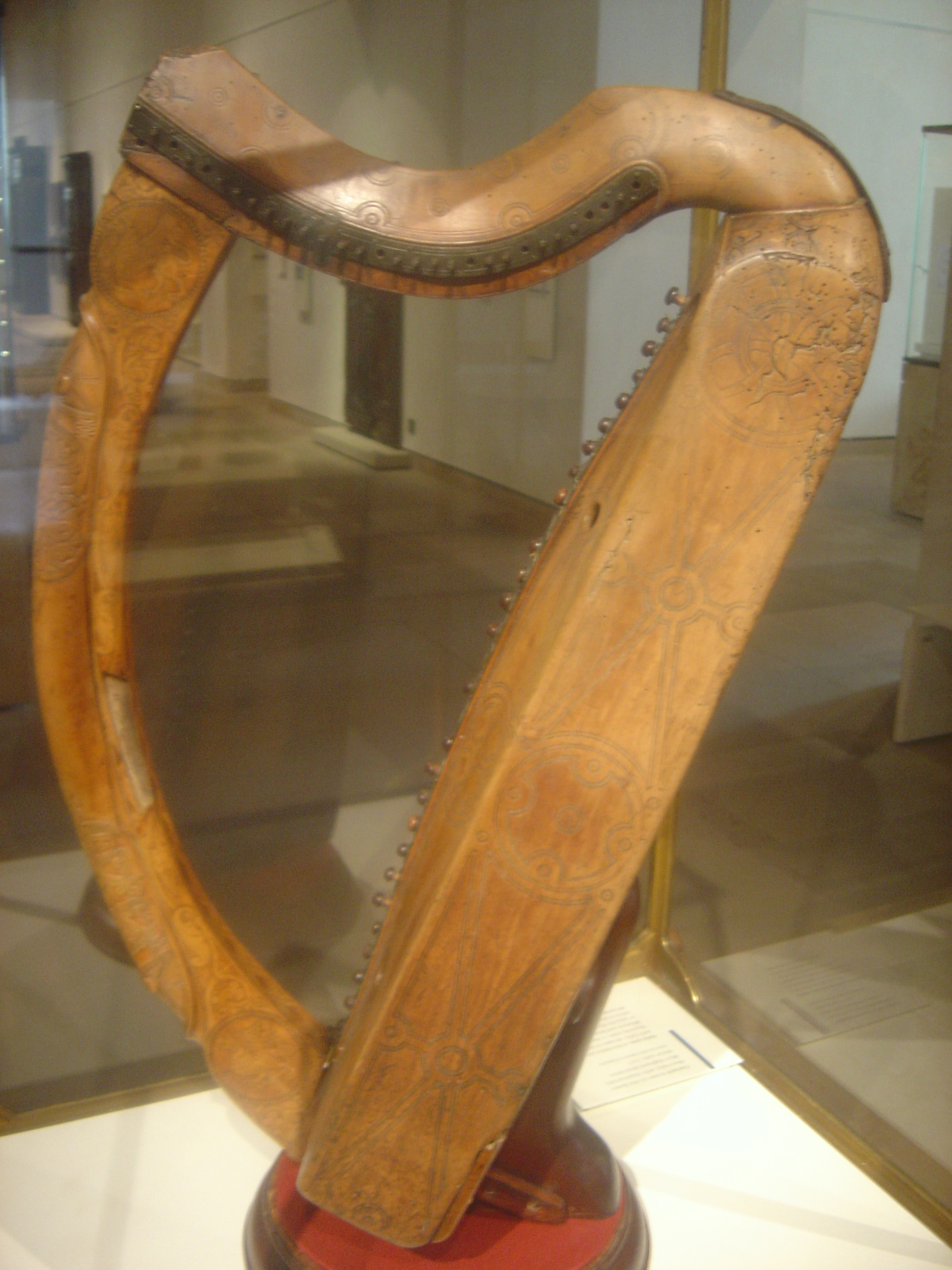
This Scottish clàrsach, known as the Clàrsach na Banrìgh Màiri or Queen Mary Harp made in the western Highlands (c.1500) now in the Museum of Scotland, is one of only three surviving medieval Gaelic harps.

Barring illustrations of harps in the 9th century Utrecht Psalter, only thirteen depictions exist in Europe of any triangular chordophone harp pre-11th century, and all thirteen of them come from Scotland. Pictish harps were strung with horsehair. The instruments apparently spread south to the Anglo-Saxons, who commonly used gut strings, and then west to the Gaels of the Highlands and Ireland. The earliest Irish word for a harp is in fact Cruit, a word which strongly suggests a Pictish provenance for the instrument. The surname MacWhirter, Mac a' Chruiteir, means son of the harpist, and is common throughout Scotland, but particularly in Carrick and Galloway.

The Clàrsach (Gd.) or Cláirseach (Ga.) is the name given to the wire-strung harp of either Scotland or Ireland. The word begins to appear by the end of the 14th century. Until the end of the Middle Ages it was the most popular musical instrument in Scotland, and harpers were among the most prestigious cultural figures in the courts of Irish/Scottish chieftains and Scottish kings and earls. In both countries, harpers enjoyed special rights and played a crucial part in ceremonial occasions such as coronations and poetic bardic recitals. The Kings of Scotland employed harpers until the end of the Middle Ages, and they featured prominently in royal iconography. Several Clarsach players were noted at the Battle of the Standard (1138), and when Alexander III of Scotland (died 1286) visited London in 1278, his court minstrels with him, records show payments were made to one Elyas, "King of Scotland's harper." One of the nicknames for the Scottish harp is "taigh nan teud", the house of strings.

Three medieval Gaelic harps survived into the modern period, two from Scotland (the Queen Mary Harp and the Lamont Harp) and one in Ireland (the Brian Boru harp), although artistic evidence suggests that all three were probably made in the western Highlands.

The playing of this Gaelic harp with wire strings died out in Scotland in the 18th century and in Ireland in the early 19th century. In the late 19th century Gaelic revival the instruments used differed greatly from the old wire-strung harps. The new instruments had gut strings, and their construction and playing style was based on the larger orchestral pedal harp. Nonetheless, the name "clàrsach" was and is still used in Scotland today to describe these new instruments. The modern gut-strung clàrsach has thousands of players, both in Scotland and Ireland, as well as North America and elsewhere. The 1931 formation of the Clarsach Society kickstarted the modern harp renaissance. Recent harp players include Savourna Stevenson, Maggie MacInnes and the band Sileas. Notable events include the annual Edinburgh International Harp Festival, which in 2006 staged the world record for the largest number of harpists to play at the same time.

=== Tin whistle ===
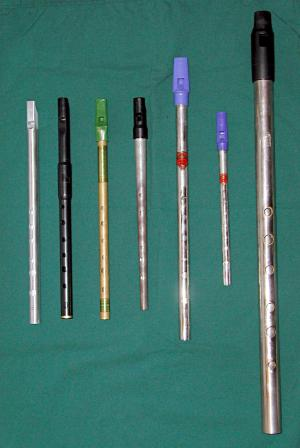
Tin whistles in a variety of makes and keys

One of the oldest tin whistles still in existence is the Tusculum whistle, found with pottery dating to the 14th and 15th centuries; it is currently in the collection of the Museum of Scotland. Today the whistle is a very common instrument in recorded Scottish music. Although few well-known performers choose the tin whistle as their principal instrument, it is quite common for pipers, flute players, and other musicians to play the whistle as well.

=== Bodhrán ===
The Irish word bodhrán (plural bodhráin), indicating a drum, is first mentioned in a document translated to English from Irish in the 17th century. The bodhrán originated in southwest Ireland, probably in the 18th century, and was known as the "poor man's tambourine". Made from farm implements and without the cymbals, it was popular among mummers or wren boys. A large oil painting by Irish artist Daniel Maclise (1806–1870) depicts a large Halloween house party in which a bodhrán features clearly. The bodhrán in Scotland and also Cape Breton, the northern mainland of Nova Scotia, Newfoundland, and Prince Edward Island is an import from Ireland due to its popularity in the 1960s because of the music of Seán Ó Riada

=== Mandolin ===
The mandolin, a plucked string instrument of the lute family, first appeared in Scotland in the late 19th century through Italian immigrant communities and travelling musicians. Although originally associated with classical and continental European repertoire, the instrument became increasingly incorporated into Scottish traditional music during the 20th century, particularly within folk revival movements of the 1960s and 1970s.

By the early 21st century, the mandolin had established a distinct role in Scottish folk ensembles, often doubling fiddle melodies or providing rhythmic accompaniment for reels, jigs, strathspeys, and march tunes. Its bright, percussive tone has made it a popular choice among contemporary Scottish acoustic duos and bands, contributing to a wider resurgence of fretted instruments within Celtic music.

Although not historically native to Scotland in the same way as the fiddle or bagpipes, the mandolin is now widely played throughout the Scottish folk scene and is taught in traditional music programmes, workshops, and community settings. Its presence in both performance and recording contexts reflects the broader evolution of Scottish folk music during the modern revival period.

== Music awards ==
The Scottish Music Awards, Scottish Album of the Year Award, the Scots Trad Music Awards and the BBC Radio Scotland Young Traditional Musician Award each recognise musical talent in Scotland annually from both Scottish and international artists.

== Music festivals ==
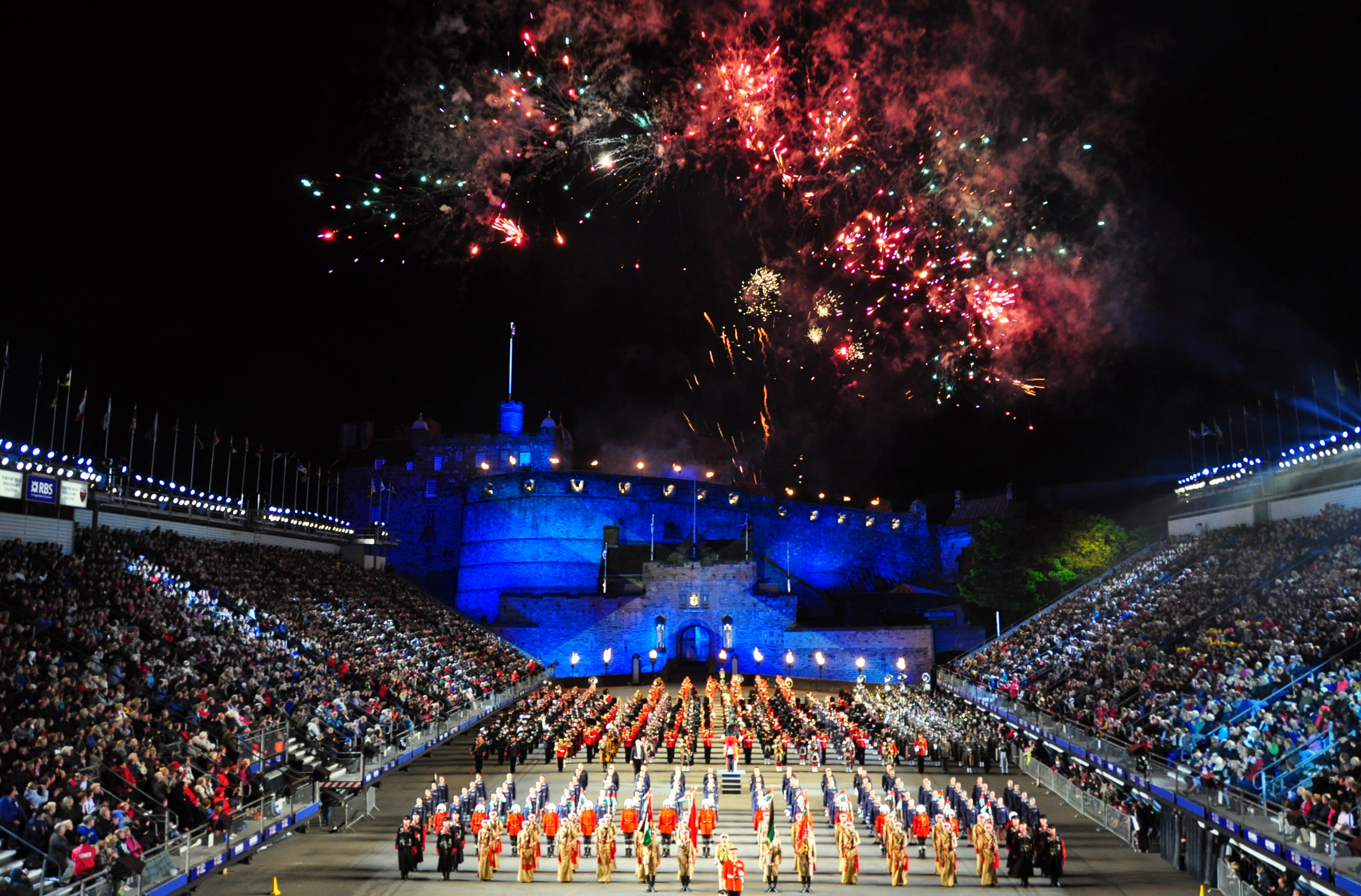
The Royal Edinburgh Military Tattoo

Scotland has long had a number of festivals that celebrate music of Scottish and international origin on an annual basis. T in the Park (1994–2016) was one of Scotland's largest music festivals, drawing crowds annually during the second weekend of July since its inception in 1994. Featuring a lineup of some of the globe's biggest and most successful artists and bands, it held a special place in the hearts of music enthusiasts. T in the Park was replaced by TRNSMT (2017–present) which similarly takes place in the second weekend of July and is held in Glasgow Green.

Celtic Connections started in 1994 and celebrates Celtic music. It is held annually in Glasgow, for 18 days in January and February. The Royal Edinburgh Military Tattoo is performed by international armed forces bands. It is held in August at Edinburgh Castle as part of the Edinburgh Festivals.

Other festivals include the Aberdeen and NE Scotland Music Festival, Big Burns Supper Festival, Callander Jazz and Blues Festival, Connect Music Festival, the Darvel Music Festival, Eden Festival, the Glasgow International Jazz Festival, Glasgow Summer Sessions, Let's Rock, the Leith Festival and the Skye Live Festival. The Glasgow Bandstand at Kelvingrove Park hosts the annual Summer Nights festival with artists such as KT Tunstall, Anastacia, Sophie Ellis-Bextor, Belinda Carlisle, Rick Astley and the Jesus & Mary Chain being past performers.

Former major festivals include Wickerman Festival, Big in Falkirk, RockNess and Be in Belhaven.

== Education and scholarships ==
The majority of schools in Scotland offer music education across secondary education and offer distinct music degrees accredited by the Scottish Qualifications Authority (SQA) at both National 5 and Higher level in which pupils examine the broad practical experience of performing, creating and understanding music. A number of individual music schools exist in Scotland, with four designated "centres of excellence" by the Scottish Government. Currently, the four "centre of excellence" music schools are Douglas Academy Music School at Douglas Academy, Milngavie, near Glasgow, Aberdeen City Music School at Dyce Academy, Aberdeen, Sgoil Chiùil na Gàidhealtachd (National Centre of Excellence in Traditional Music) at Plockton High School, Plockton, and City of Edinburgh Music School at Broughton High School and Flora Stevenson Primary.

St Mary's Music School is an independent music school in Edinburgh for pupils aged 8–19 years of age. Entry to the school is by audition and assessment, based on musical ability and potential and regardless of personal circumstances. Scottish Government funding, up to 100%, is available through the statutory Aided Places scheme to assist with the cost of tuition and boarding fees. The Royal Conservatoire of Scotland offers scholarships within the music, arts, drama and film fields, and consistently ranks among the best schools in the world in Quacquarelli Symonds (QS)'s Performing Arts ranking since the latter was established in 2016. The Conservatoire has been in the top 10 five out of six years, reaching 3rd place in 2017 and 2021. In 2022 RCS ranked fifth in the world for Performing Arts Education.

== Samples ==
- Download recording of Na cuperean, a traditional Scottish song from Nova Scotians in California from the Library of Congress' California Gold: Northern California Folk Music from the Thirties Collection; performed by Mary A. McDonald on 11 April 1939 in Berkeley, California

== See also ==
- Gaelic music
- Music of Ireland
- Music of Wales
- Music schools in Scotland
- Royal Conservatoire of Scotland
- List of pipe bands
- Scottish Gaelic punk
- Scottish hip-hop
