= Free European Song Contest 2021 =

Season of a television show

Date and venue
- Final: 15 May 2021
- Venue: Lanxess Arena, Cologne, Germany

Production
- Broadcaster: ProSieben
- Executive producer: Stefan Raab
- Presenters: Steven Gätjen; Conchita Wurst

Participants
- Number of entries: 16
- Debuting countries: Belgium; England; France; Greece; Scotland; Slovenia
- Non-returning countries: Bulgaria; Denmark; Israel; Kazakhstan; The Moon; United Kingdom

Vote
- Voting system: Each country awards 12, 10, 8-1 points for 10 songs; 13 countries have votes provided by a single juror, three (Austria, Germany, and Switzerland) have votes determined via televoting.
- Winning song: Ireland "The One"

The Free European Song Contest 2021 was the second edition of the Free European Song Contest, organised by the German television network ProSieben and the production company Raab TV.

The show was broadcast on 15 May 2021 at 20:15 CEST on the television channel ProSieben and on the streaming platform Joyn. It was presented for the second consecutive time by Steven Gätjen and Conchita Wurst.

The winning song was "The One" by Rea Garvey, representing Ireland. It marked Ireland's first victory in the event. For the second consecutive year, the Netherlands finished as runner-up, this year represented by Danny Vera with his 2019 hit "Rollercoaster." Debutant Belgium finished in third place with Milow and his song "ASAP." Although he finished with the same number of points as fellow debuting country Scotland, tiebreak rules put the Belgian entry ahead.

== Format ==
=== Presenters ===
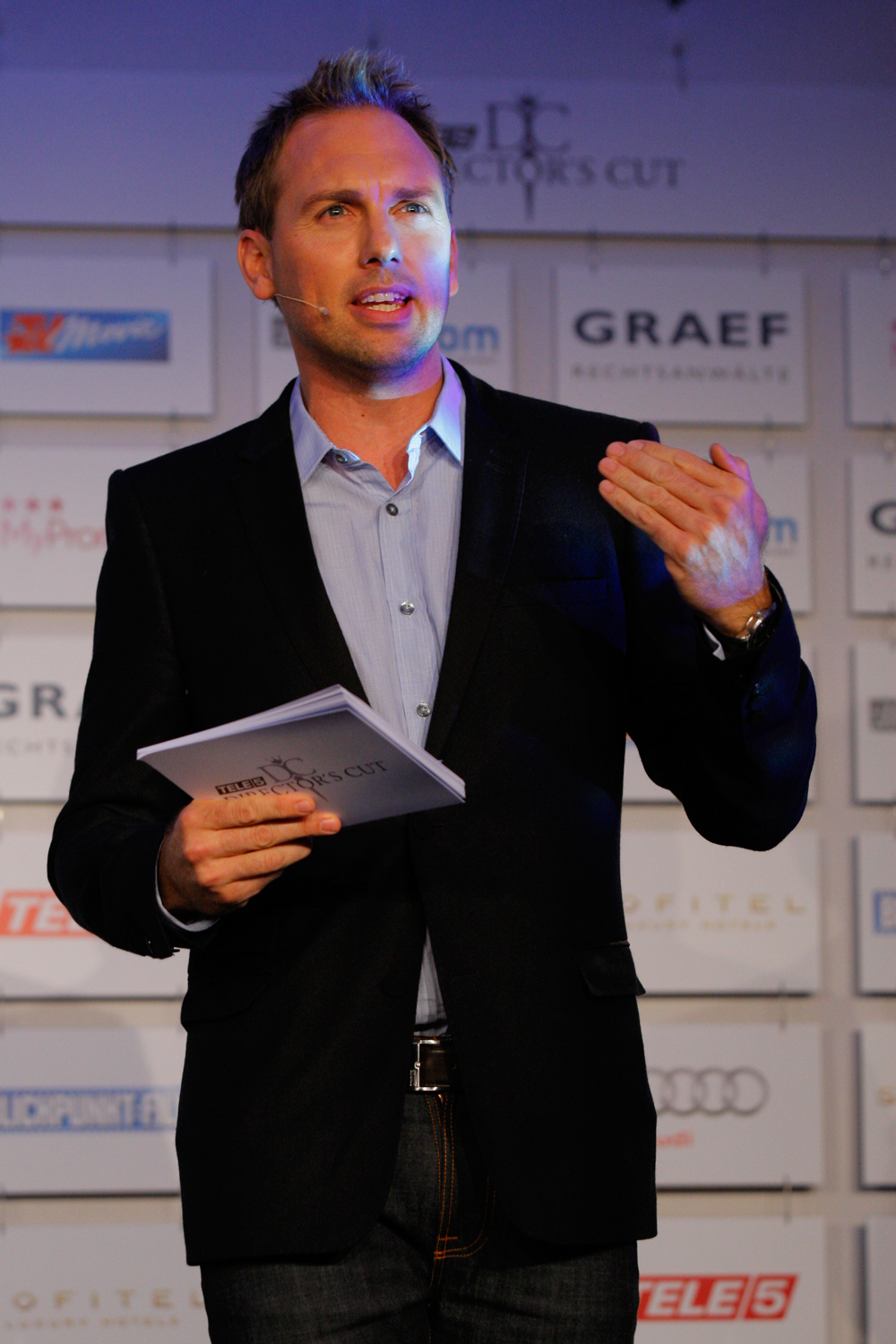
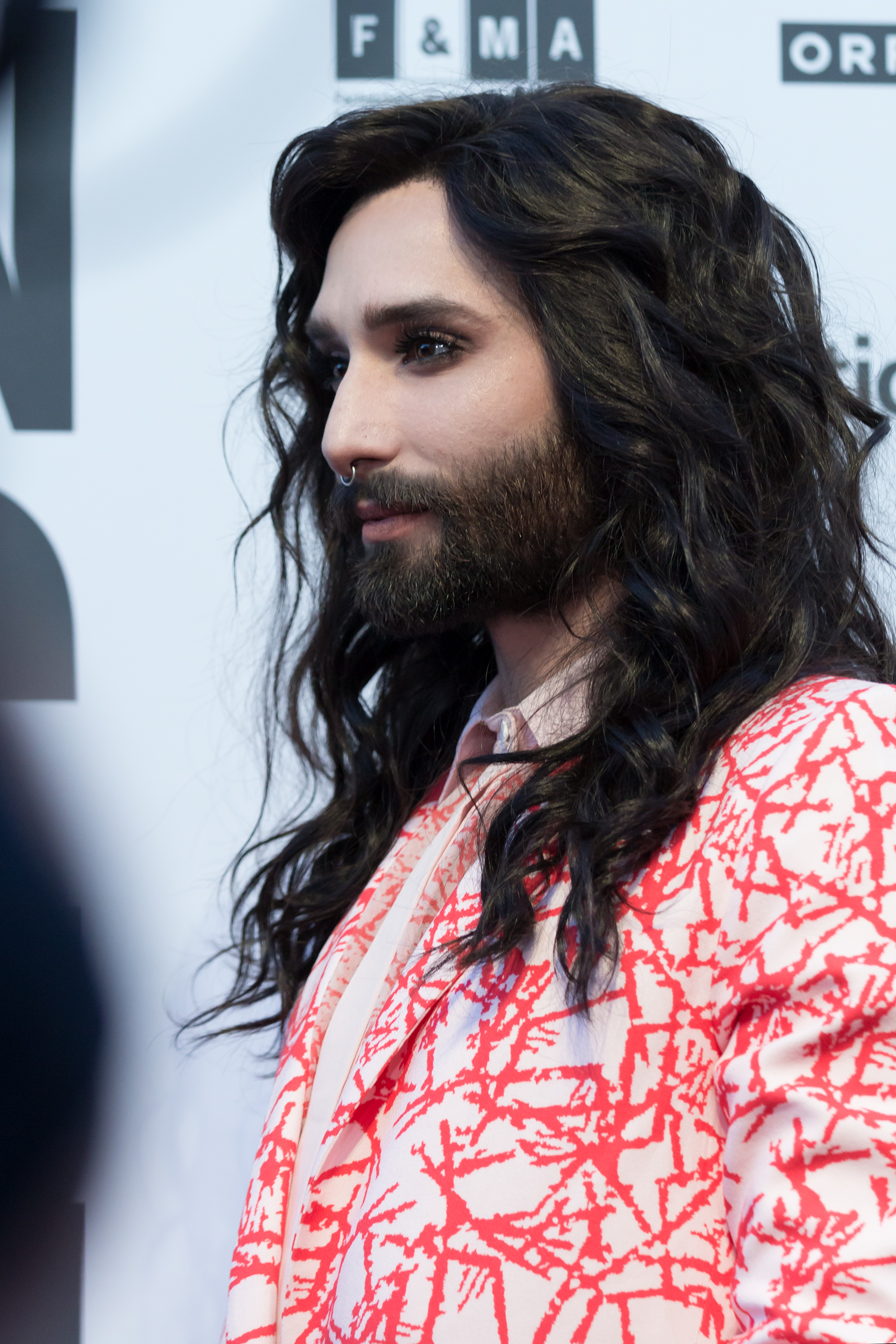
Steven Gätjen and Conchita Wurst, the presenters of Free ESC 2021

For the second consecutive time, the programme was hosted by two presenters: the German television host Steven Gätjen and the Austrian singer Conchita Wurst, who won the Eurovision Song Contest 2014.

== Participants ==
Draw	Country	Artist	Song	Language(s)	Place	Points
01	Belgium	Milow	"ASAP"	English (Note: Contains one line in French)	3	77
02	Italy	Mandy Capristo	"13 Schritte"	German, Italian	11	41
03	Slovenia	Ben Dolic	"Stuck in My Mind"	English (Note: Contains a line in Slovene)	14	27
04	Turkey	Elif	"Alles Helal"	German, Turkish	6	68
05	Poland	Fantasy	"Wild Boys"	German, Polish	13	34
06	Spain	Juan Daniél	"Corazón"	Spanish	10	52
07	England	Mighty Oaks	"Mexico"	English	9	60
08	Croatia	Jasmin Wagner	"Gold"	German (Note: Final chorus partially in Croatian)	16	18
09	Netherlands	Danny Vera	"Rollercoaster"	English	2	94
10	Greece	Sotiria	"Herz"	German (Note: Contains one line in Greek)	15	23
11	Ireland	Rea Garvey	"The One"	English	1	116
12	Austria	Mathea	"Tut mir nicht leid"	German	7	67
13	France	Hugel feat. Bloodline	"VIP"	English (Note: Contains several lines in French)	8	65
14	Scotland	Amy Macdonald	"Statues"	English	4	77
15	Switzerland	Seven	"Unser kleines Wunder"	German	12	40
16	Germany	Helge Schneider	"Supergeiler Helge Schneider"	German	5	69

== Score sheet ==
All countries used a jury vote, except Austria, Germany, and Switzerland; whose results were determined via televote.

		Results																
		Total score	Belgium	Italy	Slovenia	Turkey	Poland	Spain	England	Croatia	Netherlands	Greece	Ireland	Austria	France	Scotland	Switzerland	Germany
Contestants	Belgium	77		5	10	6	6	10	10			8	4		6	8	3	1
Contestants	Italy	41			2	2	1	5	3	5	12	2	3			4	2	
Contestants	Slovenia	27		3						7			2	2			8	
Contestants	Turkey	68	2	12	3			6		12	1	6		8	2	1	5	10
Contestants	Poland	34				12			6			5	1	5				5
Contestants	Spain	52	6		7	5	8			2		4	5	6		5	1	3
Contestants	England	60	1				12	2		3	2		10	4	10	6	6	4
Contestants	Croatia	18		2		1		1				3		3		2		6
Contestants	Netherlands	94	12	6	4		10	3	1	10		1	7	7	8	10	7	8
Contestants	Greece	23			6				7		4			1		3		2
Contestants	Ireland	116	5	10	1	8	7	7	4	7	5	10		12	4	12	12	12
Contestants	Austria	67	8	7	12	7		4	12	8			6		3			
Contestants	France	65	7	4	8	3	3	12	2	1	6		12			7		
Contestants	Scotland	77	3	1			5			4	10	7	8	10	12		10	7
Contestants	Switzerland	40	10		5	4	4		8		8				1			
Contestants	Germany	69	4	8		10	2	8	5	6	3	12	2		5		4	

=== 12 points ===
N.	Contestant	Countries giving 12 points
4	Ireland	Austria
4	Ireland	Germany
4	Ireland	Scotland
4	Ireland	Switzerland
2	Austria	England
2	Austria	Slovenia
2	France	Ireland
2	France	Spain
2	Turkey	Croatia
2	Turkey	Italy
1	England	Poland
1	Germany	Greece
1	Italy	Netherlands
1	Netherlands	Belgium
1	Poland	Turkey
1	Scotland	France

== Spokespersons ==
As in 2020, all spokespersons, save for those announcing the votes for the three televoting regions (Austria, Germany, and Switzerland), also served as their country's national juror.

- Ireland – Johnny Logan (winner of the 1980 and 1987 Eurovision Song Contests, songwriter of the winner of the 1992 contest)
- Belgium – Eric Kabongo
- Netherlands – Sylvie Meis
- France – Ofenbach
- Scotland – Nathan Evans
- Turkey – Eko Fresh (represented Turkey in the 2020 contest)
- Greece – Lucas Cordalis
- Slovenia – Lina Kuduzović (represented Slovenia at the 2015 Junior Eurovision Song Contest)
- Spain – Javi Martínez
- Poland – Halina
- England – Ross Antony
- Italy – Pietro Lombardi
- Croatia – Monica Ivancan
- Switzerland – Fabio Landert
- Germany – Sasha
- Austria – Christina Stürmer

== See also ==
- Eurovision Song Contest 2021
