= Fire (Amy Macdonald song) =

2021 single by Amy Macdonald

Single by Amy Macdonald

from the album The Human Demands
- Released: December 4, 2020
- Genre: Pop rock; soft rock
- Length: 4:15 (Album version); 3:48 (Single mix)
- Label: Infectious Music; BMG
- Songwriters: Amy Macdonald, Thom Kirkpatrick, Matt Jones
- Producer: Jim Abbiss

Amy Macdonald singles chronology
"Crazy Shade of Blue" (2020)	"Fire" (2020)	"Statues" (2021)

"Fire" is a 2021 single released by Scottish singer Amy Macdonald from her fifth studio album The Human Demands (2021). It was released in December 2020 as the albums third single via both Infectious Music and BMG.

== Background ==
Macdonald wrote "Fire" as the first song following her marriage to footballer Richard Foster in Las Vegas. Macdonald said of the song "I was co-writing with a friend Matt Jones, and we had the song finished in half an hour. I was so happy at the time, just married, that I came up with something that isn't typical of me at all. I said to my husband: this is the only song you'll ever get out of me, so enjoy it". The song has been described by Gabby Smith in House of Solo Magazine as displaying a "softer side" to Macdonald and her songwriting, claiming "melted by marriage, the track is a heartfelt homage to her husband and remains one of the most romantic pieces ever written by the acoustic guitar-playing indie rocker. Displaying her impressive vocals and impeccable talents, staccato guitar riffs elevate the love song for a pleasant pop-rock feel".

During a release party stream on her official YouTube channel, Macdonald said of the song "Fire is about those special relationships we have in our lives. The people who make us tick and we can fully be ourselves when we're around them. What would life be without them?".

== Release and reception ==
The song was released as the third single from Macdonald's fifth studio album, The Human Demands (2020). "Fire" was released internationally in December 2020 via Infectious Music and BMG. The Scotsman claims that with "Fire", Macdonald has "let down her well-maintained guard sufficiently to include a song she says is wholly personal", later claiming that "this slick, chiming AOR number on the kindling of emotions is general enough not to reveal much".

"Fire" has been described as a song which "quickly takes flight" as the opening track on The Human Demands. It has been described as a song with "calm, mood-setting intro, it unfolds to become a widescreen indie-Americana anthem which captures the latest evolution in Amy's sound. Its optimistic atmosphere is matched by its lyrics, which celebrate the power of commitment while also opening up the vulnerabilities that come with it".

== Music video ==
The music video for "Fire" was directed by Jackson Ducasse. The synopsis for the music video sees two friends, who live on the same estate, be frustrated by the various situations they find themselves in throughout daily life, with "one being hindered by a strained relationship with her mother after the loss of her father, while the other is on the verge of losing her dead-end job". Both friends appear to "make a rush for freedom". It has been said that "the inspiration and redemptive narrative is captured with a gritty yet elegant aesthetic that recalls the work of acclaimed Scottish filmmakers Andrea Arnold ('Fish Tank') and Lynne Ramsay ('Morvern Callar')."

The videos director, Jackson Ducasse, claimed that "even though Fire is ostensibly a love song, I felt it was just as appropriate to create a narrative about female friendship for this video. It's been a tough year (due to the outbreak of the COVID-19 pandemic) but friendship is one of the things that's made this time bearable for so many of us. So this video is really a love letter to the power of friendship. Working with Amy is a dream, she's a brilliant performer and her songwriting and vocals are so powerful. It's been a great privilege and pleasure to collaborate with her on this video."

The music video was uploaded to Macdonald's official YouTube channel on 4 December 2020, and has of March 2024, has generated over one million views.

== Commercial performance ==
"Fire" failed to make an appearance on any chart internationally. As of March 2024, it has been streamed over two million times of streaming service Spotify.

== Track listing ==
Single mix
No.	Title	Length
1.	"Fire"	3:48

Album version
No.	Title	Length
1.	"Fire"	4:15
