= The Hudson =

The Hudson may refer to:

- Hudson River or The Hudson, a river in New York and New Jersey
- The Hudson (song), a 2020 song by Amy Macdonald
- The Hudson, a book about the river by Carl Carmer

== See also ==
- Hudson (disambiguation)
