= Free European Song Contest 2020 =

International song competition

Date and venue
- Final: 16 May 2020
- Venue: Brainpool-Studios; Cologne, Germany

Production
- Broadcaster: ProSieben
- Executive producer: Stefan Raab
- Presenters: Steven Gätjen; Conchita Wurst

Participants
- Number of entries: 16

Vote
- Voting system: Each country awards 1–8, 10 and 12 points to their ten favourite songs. The points from Germany, Austria and Switzerland are derived from televoting. The points from the other countries are decided by their respective spokespersons.
- Winning song: Spain "Like I Love You"

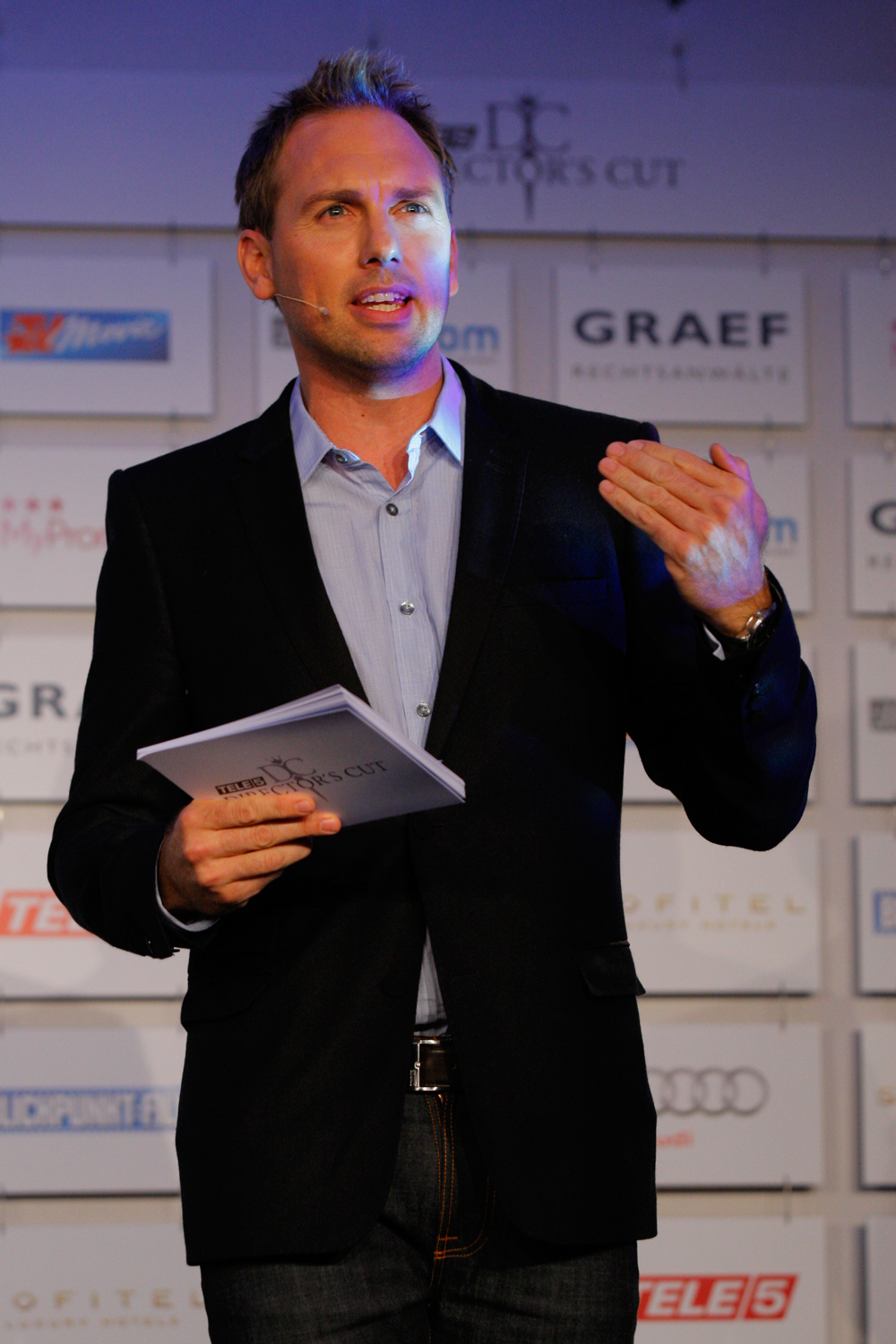
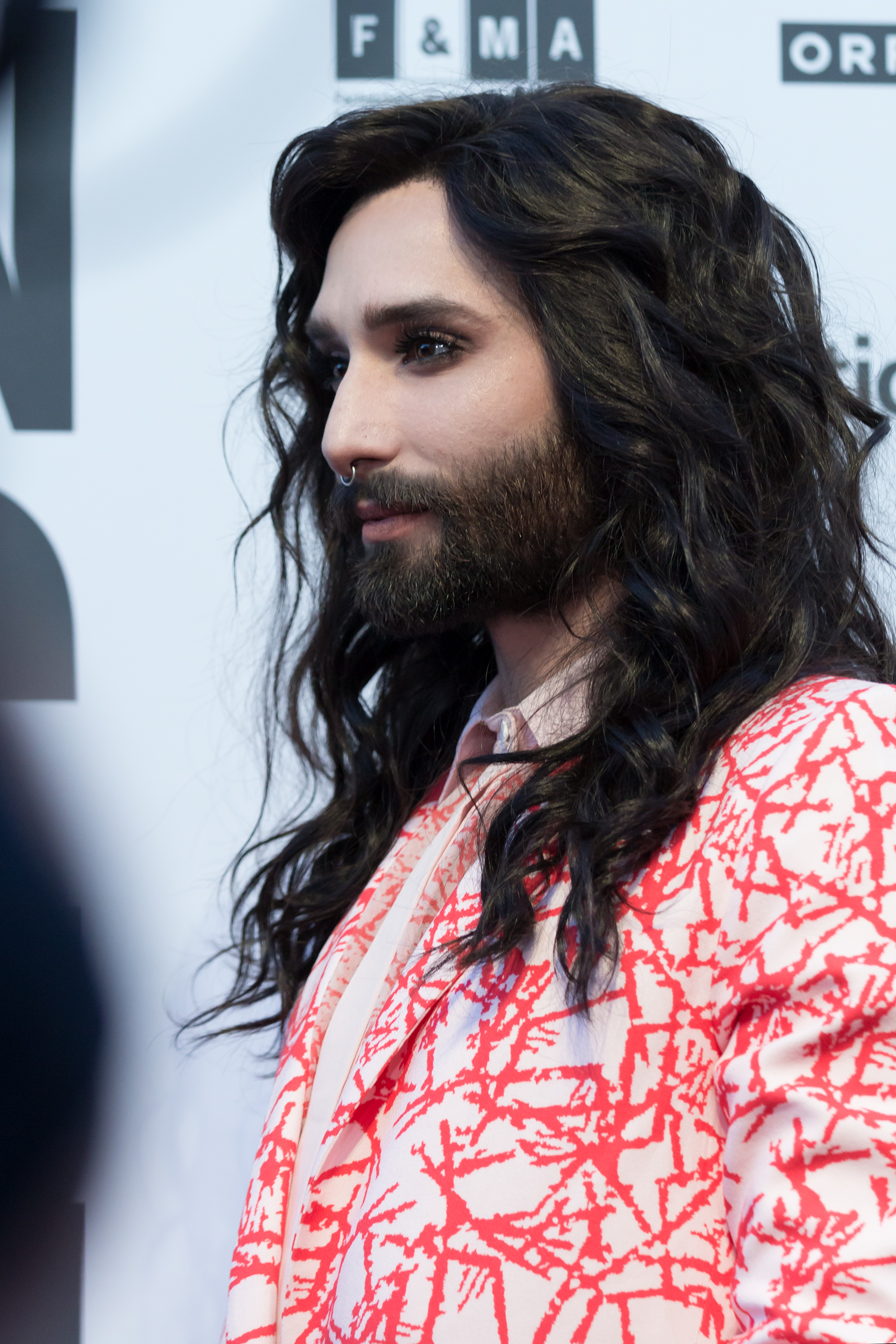
Hosts Steven Gätjen and Conchita Wurst

The Free European Song Contest 2020 was the first edition of the Free European Song Contest, organised by the German television network ProSieben and the production company Brainpool TV. It served as an alternative for the Eurovision Song Contest 2020, which was planned to be held in Rotterdam, Netherlands, but was cancelled due to the COVID-19 pandemic.

The show was broadcast on 16 May 2020 at 20:15 CEST on the television channel ProSieben. It was presented by Steven Gätjen and Conchita Wurst. It was also broadcast on the Austrian private television broadcaster Puls 24 with commentary by Tamara Mascara, Dori Bauer and Patrick Fux. ProSieben Austria and ProSieben Schweiz also took the live feed.

== Format ==
=== Presenters ===
The programme was hosted by two presenters: the German television host Steven Gätjen and the Austrian singer Conchita Wurst, who won the Eurovision Song Contest 2014.

== Participants ==
R/O	Country	Artist	Song	Language(s)	Place	Points
1	Netherlands	Ilse DeLange	"Changes"	English	2	88
2	Turkey	Eko Fresh feat. Umut Timur	"Günaydin"	German, Turkish	6	71
3	Ireland	Sion Hill	"Speak Up"	English	10	53
4	Croatia	Vanessa Mai	"Highlight (Ti si moja snaga)"	German, Croatian, Spanish	9	55
5	Bulgaria	Oonagh	"Du bist genug"	German, Bulgarian	8	62
6	Austria	Josh.	"Wo bist du"	German	15	22
7	Poland	Glasperlenspiel	"Immer da"	German (Note: Contains a few lines in Polish)	11	46
8	United Kingdom	Kelvin Jones	"Friends"	English	12	45
9	Kazakhstan	Mike Singer	"Paranoid"	German (Note: Contains one line in Russian)	14	23
10	Denmark	Kate Hall	"Reset"	English (Note: Contains one line in Danish)	16	20
11	Spain	Nico Santos	"Like I Love You"	English, Spanish	1	104
12	Italy	Sarah Lombardi	"Te amo mi amor"	German, Italian (Note: Contains a title and repeated refrain in Spanish)	13	37
13	Switzerland	Stefanie Heinzmann	"All We Need Is Love"	English, Walser German	7	66
14	The Moon	Der Astronaut	"Back to the Moon"	English	3	85
15	Israel	Gil Ofarim	"Alles auf Hoffnung"	German (Note: Contains one line in Hebrew)	5	75
16	Germany	Helge Schneider	"Forever at Home"	German, English	4	76

== Score sheet ==
		Results																
		Total score	Netherlands	Turkey	Ireland	Croatia	Bulgaria	Austria	Poland	United Kingdom	Kazakhstan	Denmark	Spain	Italy	Switzerland	The Moon	Israel	Germany
Contestants	Netherlands	88		6	6	10	8			6	10	12	12	3		3	12	
Contestants	Turkey	71				3		10	12	8	7	4		1	5	6	5	10
Contestants	Ireland	53	10	8		4	4				6		4	6	1	8	2	
Contestants	Croatia	55	1	3			12	5	6	5	8		2	2	7			4
Contestants	Bulgaria	62	4	10	8			1		4	12	8		12				3
Contestants	Austria	22		2		2	6		5						3		3	1
Contestants	Poland	46	8	5	1	6	1				2	5		10		2	6	
Contestants	United Kingdom	45		1	3				3			10	10			10	8	
Contestants	Kazakhstan	23	7		4			2	7				1					2
Contestants	Denmark	20	2	7			2			2					2	1	4	
Contestants	Spain	104	12		7	5	10	6	10	12	4	3		5	8	7	7	8
Contestants	Italy	37		4	2		3	4	8		1	2	3		4		1	5
Contestants	Switzerland	66	5			8	5	7	1	1		6	8	4		4	10	7
Contestants	The Moon	85			5	12		12	2	10		7	6	7	12			12
Contestants	Israel	75	6		10	7	7	3		7	5		5	8	6	5		6
Contestants	Germany	76	3	12	12	1		8	4	3	3	1	7		10	12		

=== 12 points ===
N.	Contestant	Countries giving 12 points
4	The Moon	Austria
4	The Moon	Croatia
4	The Moon	Germany
4	The Moon	Switzerland
3	Germany	Ireland
3	Germany	The Moon
3	Germany	Turkey
3	Netherlands	Denmark
3	Netherlands	Israel
3	Netherlands	Spain
2	Bulgaria	Italy
2	Bulgaria	Kazakhstan
2	Spain	Netherlands
2	Spain	United Kingdom
1	Croatia	Bulgaria
1	Turkey	Poland

== Spokespersons ==
The spokespersons announced the scores of their respective country's national jury

- Austria – Tamara Mascara
- Bulgaria – Friends of Oonagh
- Croatia – Marino Mandekić (father of Vanessa Mai)
- Denmark – Valeria (mother of Kate Hall)
- Germany – Heidi Klum and Tom Kaulitz
- Israel – Lion Rosenberg
- Ireland – Angelo Kelly
- Italy – Michelle Hunziker
- Kazakhstan – Paul (father of Mike Singer)
- The Moon – Michael Herbig as Mr. Spuck
- Netherlands – Duncan Laurence
- Poland – Lukas Podolski
- Spain – Clarissa Wellenbrink (sister of Nico Santos)
- Switzerland – Beatrice Egli
- Turkey – Hakan Çalhanoğlu
- United Kingdom – Melanie C

== See also ==
- Eurovision Song Contest 2020
- Eurovision: Europe Shine a Light
- Eurovision 2020 – das deutsche Finale
- Der kleine Song Contest
- Die Grand Prix Hitliste
