= Simon Fraser (musician) =

Scottish fiddler, composer and collector of Highland music

Simon Fraser (1772 or 1773 – 1852), commonly known as Captain Simon Fraser of Knockie, was a Scottish Gaelic-speaking fiddler, composer, army officer, and collector and editor of traditional Highland music. He is best known for The Airs and Melodies Peculiar to the Highlands of Scotland and the Isles, published in 1816. Its 232 tunes include melodies associated with Gaelic songs, dance music, inherited family repertory and compositions by Fraser himself.

== Early life and family ==
Fraser was born at Ardachie, near Fort Augustus, in the parish of Abertarff, Inverness-shire. Most reference and archival sources give his birth year as 1773, although modern scholarship has dated it to 1772 or 1773.

He was the only son of Captain John Fraser, who had served in the 78th Highland Regiment, and Janet Fraser. John Fraser was himself remembered as a singer and performer of Highland airs. Simon Fraser's later collection drew substantially upon music transmitted through his father and earlier members of his family.

Fraser's first wife was Jane Fraser, whom he married in 1802. Their children included a son, Hugh. Fraser also had a son, Angus Fraser, with Catherine Watson before their marriage. Following Jane's death, Fraser married Watson in 1815; they subsequently had two daughters, Catherine and Jamesina.

== Military service ==
Fraser entered the Fraser Fencibles in 1795 and remained with the regiment until its disbandment in 1802, by which time he had attained the rank of captain. The unit served in Ireland, including during the rebellion of 1798, and Fraser was credited with helping to recruit Highlanders for it. After his military service he farmed at Knockie in Stratherrick, from which his usual territorial designation was derived.

== Music and publications ==
=== Early collection ===
In 1794 or 1795 Fraser published Thirty Highland Airs, Strathspeys, &c., with bass accompaniments for violoncello or harpsichord. Its title page described the contents as chiefly new tunes, with a smaller number of older pieces not previously published. Twenty-four of its thirty tunes were identified as Fraser's own compositions.

A note in one surviving copy states that Fraser had decided to publish after a manuscript that he had lent for the preparation of bass parts was not returned. He feared that its music might otherwise be issued under another person's name.

=== The 1816 collection ===
Fraser's principal work, The Airs and Melodies Peculiar to the Highlands of Scotland and the Isles, was published in Edinburgh in 1816. The collection contains 232 tunes, arranged with accompaniments suitable for pianoforte, harp, organ or violoncello. It was dedicated to the Highland Society of Scotland, whose committee had inspected and approved the project.

Fraser said that much of the repertory had been preserved by members of his family. In his prospectus he described how his paternal grandfather's business journeys throughout the Highlands and Islands had provided opportunities to hear and retain local songs. His father had added music heard from Highlanders during his military service, while Fraser himself arranged the material for publication and included both traditional pieces and his own compositions.

Although many of the melodies were associated with Gaelic songs, Fraser chose to publish the music rather than complete Gaelic texts. He supplied Gaelic or English titles, comments on the supposed histories and origins of individual tunes, and an extensive appendix. The resulting work was principally an instrumental publication, but it has subsequently been used by scholars as evidence for melodies belonging to Gaelic songs whose words survived separately in oral or written tradition.

Musicologist Karen McAulay has interpreted Fraser's criticism of earlier collectors, particularly Patrick MacDonald, as an attempt to establish his own authority through direct familiarity with Highland musical tradition. She notes, however, that commercial considerations also shaped the publication of Fraser's collection, and that he regarded Alexander Campbell's Albyn's Anthology (1816–1818) as a competing work.

The authenticity of some aspects of Fraser's presentation was disputed. The early nineteenth-century commentator William Stenhouse objected to Fraser's use of expressive markings, ornaments and altered notes, regarding them as foreign to the character of older Gaelic melody. Later scholarship has similarly distinguished between the traditional sources of the tunes and Fraser's work as an arranger and instrumental composer.

== Later life ==
Fraser suffered serious financial difficulties around the time of the publication of the 1816 collection. He lost his tenancy at Knockie and moved to Inverness in 1817. He later advertised a second volume of Airs and Melodies, but it was never published during his lifetime. Other literary and musical projects mentioned in his correspondence, including letters to Walter Scott, also remained incomplete.

In a will made in 1828, Fraser identified his son Angus as the intended successor to his musical work. Angus, who served for many years in the army, later returned to assist his father and continued collecting, arranging and copying Highland music.

Fraser died in Inverness in 1852.

== Posthumous publication and legacy ==
Between 1816 and his death, Fraser continued to correct and add to his collection. Angus Fraser subsequently prepared an amended copy incorporating material left by his father. After the deaths of both men, a new edition was published at Inverness in 1874, with editorial work by William Mackay. It included corrections, revised Gaelic spellings and material derived from the Fraser manuscripts.

The surviving papers associated with Fraser and his son Angus are held by the University of Edinburgh as the Angus Fraser Manuscript (Coll-58). Although named after Angus, the collection incorporates material inherited from his father as well as Angus's own work. Its contents range from drafts of projected musical collections to tune variations and miscellaneous working papers.

Fraser's 1816 publication remains an important source for the study of Highland fiddle music and the melodies of Scottish Gaelic songs. Its significance lies both in the repertory it preserved and in the evidence it provides of the way Highland music was adapted for the domestic and published music market of the early nineteenth century.

== Selected publications ==
- Thirty Highland Airs, Strathspeys, &c., with a Bass for the Violoncello or Harpsichord (Edinburgh, 1795).
- Elegy, Occasioned by the Sudden Summons of a Friend from the Career of Life (Inverness, 1811).
- The Airs and Melodies Peculiar to the Highlands of Scotland and the Isles (Edinburgh, 1816).
- The Airs and Melodies Peculiar to the Highlands of Scotland and the Isles, new edition prepared from the Fraser papers (Inverness, 1874; posthumous).
