= Tamara Mascara =

Austrian drag queen, DJ, fashion designer, presenter

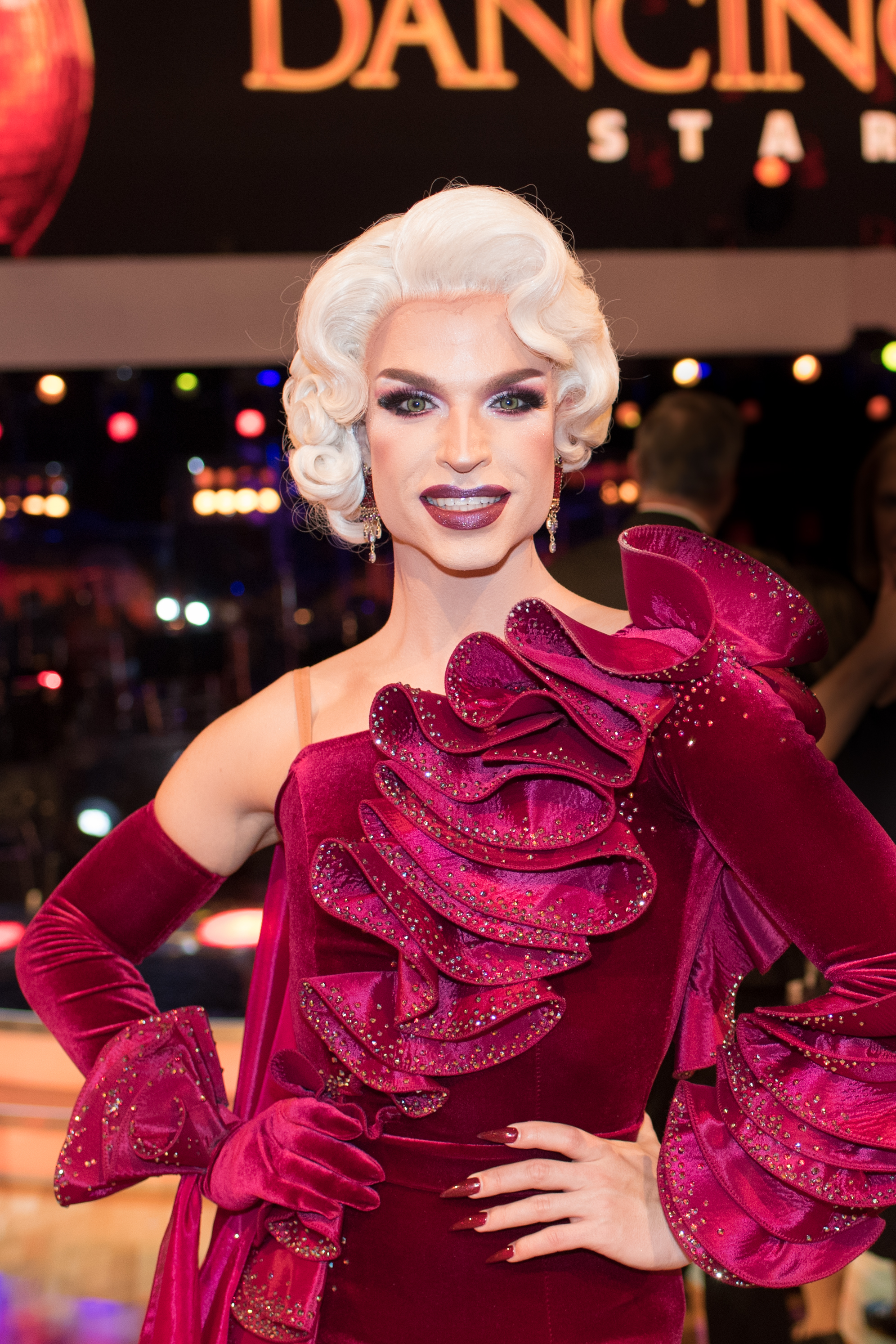
- Tamara Mascara at Dancing Stars in 2020
- Born: Raphael Massaro; 15 November 1987 (age 38); Vienna, Austria
- Occupations: Drag Queen; Fashion designer; DJ; Presenter; YouTuber; Reality Television Personality
- Website: www.tamaramascara.com

Tamara Mascara is the stage name of Raphael Massaro (born 15 November 1987), is an Austrian DJ, fashion designer, presenter and one of the best-known Austrian drag queens.

== Early life ==
Tamara Mascara grew up in Vienna, Austria. At an early age, she took ballet training at the Vienna State Opera. Later she graduated from a fashion school at the Schloss Hetzendorf.

== Career ==
Her career as a DJ started at the legendary Heaven Vienna, the longest running House music clubbing in Vienna. Since 2011 she is co-founder, co-organizer and artistic director for The Circus, the biggest LGBT-party in Austria.

At the 59th Eurovision Song Contest in Copenhagen, Mascara was the Make-up artist for Conchita Wurst representing Austria who won the competition. She also was part of the Austrian postcard, a recording that introduces each country before their performances.

Beginning in the end of 2016, Mascara started a YouTube channel, themed mostly around Cosmetics and Drag. In 2018, she launched her own eyelash collection.

As a testimonial for an open and LGBT-friendly Vienna she often collaborates with the Vienna Tourist Board, and visits cities and Christopher Street Days around the world, like in Tokyo or Rome.

For the Austrian edition of Sprite's Stay Fresh commercial, an international campaign against mobbing and hate on the Internet, Mascara is the lead representative. The company supports the Austrian telephone counselling for children (Rat auf Draht) and other social projects.

In 2018, she played Madame Oh in Mara Mattuschka's queer drama film Phaidros.

Mascara hosts different events, like Balls, LGBT parties or the annual drag competition for Miss Pride during Vienna Pride. She also co-hosted the After Show Talk Programme to the Eurovision Song Contest 2019 on ORF, the Austrian public service broadcaster.

She was also candidate in the 13th edition of Austria's Dancing Stars show, she was partnered with Dimitar Stefanin. Mascara is, after Courtney Act who took part in the Australian version of the show, only the second drag queen to compete in the BBC Worldwide's international Dancing with the Stars franchise. Despite high scores from the judges, she was eliminated in the second episode.
