= Statues (Amy Macdonald song) =

2021 single by Amy Macdonald

Single by Amy Macdonald

from the album The Human Demands
- Released: February 19, 2021
- Genre: Pop rock; soft rock
- Length: 3:46
- Label: Infectious Music; BMG
- Songwriters: Amy Macdonald; Thom Kirkpatrick
- Producer: Jim Abbiss

Amy Macdonald singles chronology
"Fire" (2020)	"Statues" (2021)	"Bridges" (2021)

Music video
- "Statues" on YouTube

"Statues" is a 2021 single released by Scottish singer Amy Macdonald from her fifth studio album The Human Demands (2021). It was released in February 2021 as the albums fourth single via both Infectious Music and BMG, and was selected to represent Scotland at the Free European Song Contest 2021, finishing in fourth place with 77 points.

== Background ==
Regarding the inspiration and writing process for "Statues", the song is a homage to the house and street, in which Macdonald lived and grew up in, in her home city Glasgow, Scotland. The composition of the song has been compared to "a Springsteen-esque skill for depicting snapshots of ordinary life with a poetic slant". Whilst interviewed about the song, Macdonald said "I look back and think of the times I spent in that house with my family and our dog Jackson and I smile,” she says. “My parents moved out of that house a few years ago and it was sad for us all, but especially them. But we’ll always have those memories. I’ve had so many people say that they love this song because of the imagery it creates. I think it’s because we all have those memories of the places we grew up in".

The song was included on her fifth studio album The Human Demands which was released in 2020. In an interview with Wonderland, Macdonald said, "It's an album about life and the ups and downs that come with it. It's never easy for anyone and I don't think we give ourselves enough credit sometimes. We're just expected to constantly be going 100mph all the time and that can be demanding for anyone. I wanted the album title to reflect the reality of life for the majority of people. [...] Myself, my producer Jim and all the wonderful musicians were just excited to be making music again. We felt genuinely lucky to be in the position that we could have a bit of normality back in our lives." Released during the COVID-19 pandemic, Macdonald said on her Instagram account, "I hope this album can be a comfort in these turbulent times. I am extremely proud of it. It feels like a special record coming out at an important time. Thank you so much for all your support over the past 15 years. I wouldn't be anything without you."

== Music video ==
The music video for "Statues" has been described as "assisting the song’s reflective quality by giving a fresh and invigorating twist in its accompanying video". The music video for "Statues" was directed by video director Jackson Ducasse. The synopsis for the music video "puts the spotlight on The Statues, a pre-teenage girl band who are dictating their own destiny despite their young age. From the studio to the stage via a self-assured press conference, the trio hurtle through all the defining moments of the rock ‘n’ roll world. The result is a playful and engaging tribute to the rockumentary, which documents the band's history in just four rollercoaster minutes".

== Free European Song Contest 2021 ==
Due to the outbreak of COVID-19, the 2020 Eurovision Song Contest was cancelled due to associated government restrictions. As a means of compensating the cancellation, the Free European Song Contest 2020 was organised by the German television network ProSieben and the production company Raab TV. In 2021, the Free Eurovision Song Contest returned, and Scotland debuted at the event with Macdonald selected to represent Scotland with "Statues" during the Free European Song Contest 2021 which was broadcast on 15 May 2021.

Macdonald performed 14th out of 16 artists on the night. During voting, "Statues" finished the contest fourth, receiving 77 points. It received the maximum 12 points from France, 10 points from, Austria, the Netherlands and Switzerland, 8 points from the Republic of Ireland, 7 from Greece and Germany, 5 points from Poland, 4 from Croatia and 1 point from Italy. It received 0 points from Slovenia, England, Turkey and Spain.

== Commercial performance ==
"Statues" did not appear in any official singles charts across European, or indeed internationally. However, it did peak at number 58 on the UK Singles Downloads Chart.

== Track listing ==
Digital download
No.	Title	Length
1.	"Statues"	3:46

Album version
No.	Title	Length
2.	"Statues"	3:46

== Charts ==
Chart (2021)	Peak position
UK Singles Downloads (OCC)	58
