= Free European Song Contest =

International song competition

- Also known as: FreeESC
- Genre: Song contest
- Created by: Stefan Raab
- Based on: Eurovision Song Contest
- Presented by: Steven Gätjen; Conchita Wurst
- Country of origin: Germany
- Original language: German
- No. of episodes: 2 contest

Production
- Executive producer: Stefan Raab
- Running time: ~4 hours (finals)
- Production company: Brainpool TV

Original release
- Network: ProSieben
- Release: 15 May 2020 – 15 May 2021

The Free European Song Contest is an international song competition, organised by the German television network ProSieben and the production company Brainpool TV, with participants representing primarily European countries. The contest is similar in format to the long-running Eurovision Song Contest: each participating country submits an original song to be performed on live television, then casts votes for the other countries' songs to determine the winner.

The overall winner of the contest is the entry that has received the most points after the scores from every country have been collected and totalled.

== History ==
As the Eurovision Song Contest 2020 could not take place due to the outbreak of the coronavirus disease 2019 (COVID-19) in Europe, German TV station ProSieben and German entertainer Stefan Raab decided to organise Free European Song Contest as an alternative. After the success of the first edition, ProSieben has decided to plan the event also for 2021.

The first contest was held in the city of Cologne, Germany, on 16 May 2020. Sixteen countries participated: each participating country submitted an entry. The contest was won by Nico Santos, representing Spain, with the song "Like I Love You".

A third edition was announced for 2022 during the show. However, on 25 June 2022, it was announced that the show would be suspended for a year and would return in 2023 for a third edition. The 2023 contest was cancelled in May of that year.

== Participation ==
Year	Country making its début entry
2020	Austria, Bulgaria, Croatia, Denmark, Germany, Ireland, Israel, Italy, Kazakhstan, Netherlands, Poland, Spain, Switzerland, The Moon, Turkey, United Kingdom
2021	Belgium, England, (Note: In 2020, England and Scotland participated as separate countries of the United Kingdom.) France, Greece, Scotland, Slovenia

The following countries have all participated in the Eurovision Song Contest, or are eligible to compete by the standards of the Free European Song Contest, but have not had either public or private broadcasters indicate interest in participating (as of yet):

- Albania
- Andorra
- Armenia
- Australia
- Azerbaijan
- Belarus
- Bosnia and Herzegovina
- Cyprus
- Czech Republic
- Estonia
- Finland
- Georgia
- Hungary
- Iceland
- Latvia
- Liechtenstein
- Lithuania
- Luxembourg
- Malta
- Moldova
- Monaco
- Montenegro
- Morocco
- North Macedonia
- Norway
- Portugal
- Romania
- Russia
- San Marino
- Serbia
- Slovakia
- Sweden
- Ukraine
- United Kingdom
  - Northern Ireland
  - Wales

== Competition history ==
Edition	Date of final	Year	Host broadcaster(s)	Host city	Countries	Winner(s)	Performer	Song	Points	Margin	Runner up	3rd place	Ref.
1st	16 May	2020	ProSieben	(West Germany) Cologne	16	Spain	Nico Santos	"Like I Love You"	104	16	Netherlands	The Moon	
2nd	15 May	2021	ProSieben	(West Germany) Cologne	16	Ireland	Rea Garvey	"The One"	116	22	Netherlands	Belgium (Note: Both Belgium and Scotland finished with 77 points; however, the official ranking and Eurovision tiebreak rules would put Belgium ahead of Scotland.)	

=== Medal table ===
The table below shows the top-three placings from each contest, along with the years that a country won the contest.

Country	1st place, gold medalist(s)	2nd place, silver medalist(s)	3rd place, bronze medalist(s)	Total	Years won
Ireland	1	0	0	1	2021
Spain	1	0	0	1	2020
Netherlands	0	2	0	2	—N/a
Belgium	0	0	1	1	—N/a
The Moon	0	0	1	1	—N/a

== Presenters ==
Year	Presenter(s)
2020	Steven Gätjen and Conchita Wurst
2021	Steven Gätjen and Conchita Wurst

== See also ==
- Bundesvision Song Contest, previous contest organised by ProSieben and held annually between the 16 states of Germany.
- Eurovision Song Contest
