= Steven Gätjen =

German–American television presenter (born 1972)

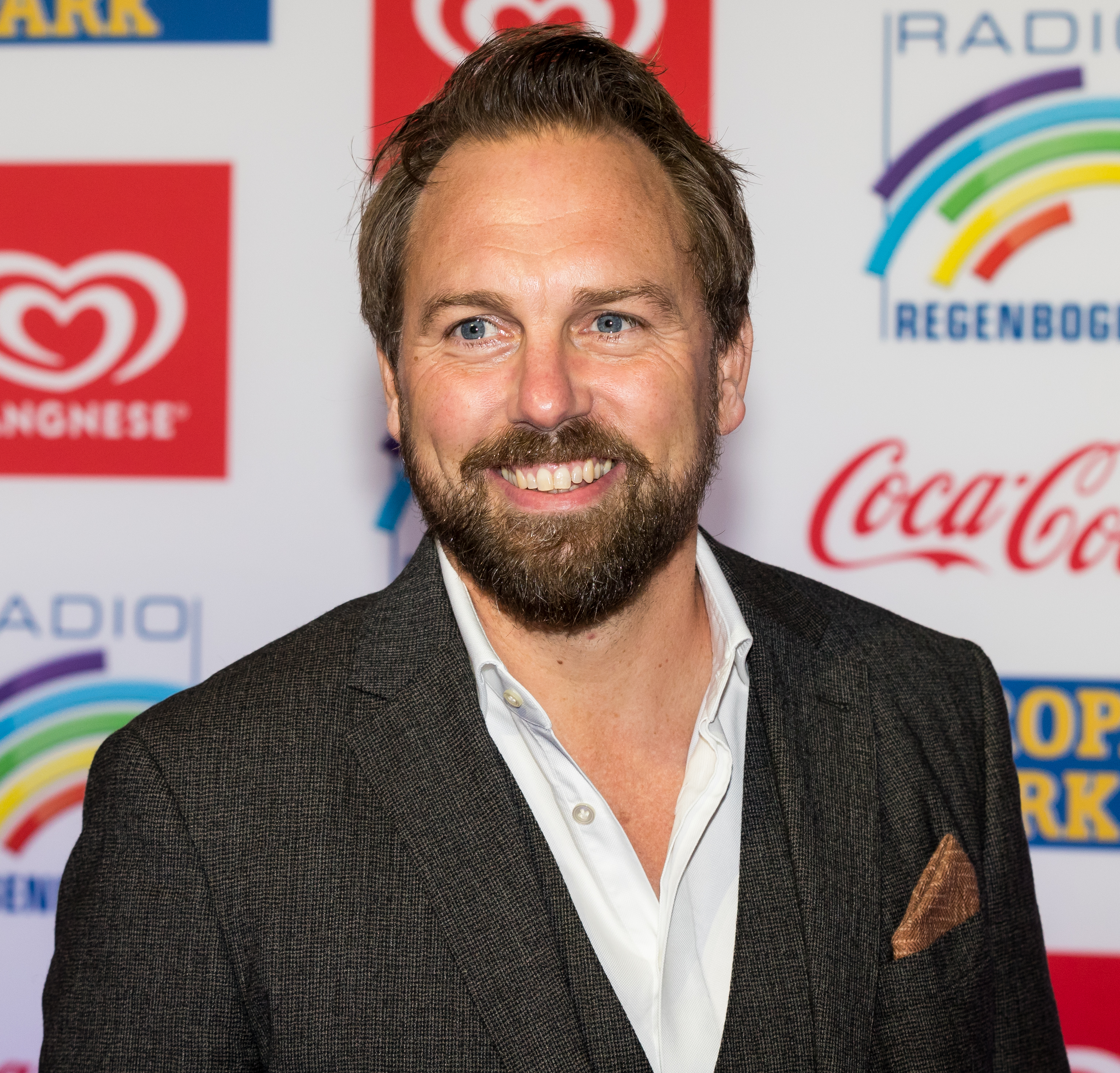
Gätjen in 2018

Steven Gätjen (born 25 September 1972 in Phoenix, Arizona) is a German-American event and TV host based in Germany.

== Private life and education ==
Steven Gätjen was born in 1972 in Phoenix, Arizona, where his German father worked as a doctor. When he was three years old, he and his family moved to Germany because his father took a job at the Altonaer Klinik. His mother is Columnist of the Hamburger Abendblatt. In addition to the actor Andy Gätjen, he has another younger brother.

In 1992, Gätjen graduated from high school in Hamburg, then did a year of Zivildienst and internship at OK Radio. He also attended the University of California in Los Angeles and the Hollywood Film School in San Francisco.

Gätjen lives with his wife in Hamburg-Ottensen and has a second home in New York City.

== Career ==
Gätjen has been a presenter of various television shows since 1999, initially mainly on ProSieben. From 2000 to 2002, from 2007 to 2015 and again since 2017 he has hosted the German broadcast of the Oscar ceremony. In 2010, he took sixth place with Daniel Wiemer in the synchronized diving at the TV total Turmspringen. Since 2011 – after Matthias Opdenhövel left the station – he has hosted all TV total events; the TV total Stock Car Crash Challenge, the TV total Tower Diving, the Wok World Championship and the Autoball Championships. In June 2011, he took over the moderation of Beat the Raab.

In 2016, he moved to ZDF. He had already launched the project FredCarpet with MBTV-Produktions GmbH in 2015. There he gives film tips and presents unabridged interviews from the contributions of Steven Loves Cinema. Since November 2015, some of the videos from the associated website have also been broadcast by the Internet channel Rocket Beans TV. In March 2017 he presented the Goldene Kamera award ceremony for the first time. In April and May 2017 he was the moderator of the daily quiz show Clever abgestaubt on ZDFneo. In the film Mission: Impossible – Fallout (2018) he had a cameo as an Apostle agent. Since 2019, he has hosted the show Joko & Klaas gegen ProSieben on ProSieben. In 2020 and 2021, he hosted the Free European Song Contest, launched by Stefan Raab, together with Conchita Wurst. Since May 2020, he has been a permanent member of the cinema format Kino+ on Rocket Beans TV, after having already appeared as a guest several times. In January 2022, he stepped in on Schlag den Star as a replacement candidate for fellow actor Frederick Lau, who was ill with COVID-19, but had to narrowly admit defeat to competitor Max Kruse.

Gätjen is involved in the catering company Monterone in the New York borough of Brooklyn.

- "Top 10 TV" (weekly prime time show, August 2005 to June 2006) – host, Kabel 1
- "Werbung! Das Beste aus aller Welt" (weekly, since July 2005) – host, Kabel 1
- "Disney Filmparade" (weekly kids show, since April 2004) – host, Pro7
- "Soundcheck" (weekly music show, since March 2004) – host, Hit24 (Premiere)
- "E! News Live" (daily entertainment news show, 2002–2003) – host and segment producer, E!
- "Der Maulwurf (The Mole)" (adventure game show, 2002) – host, Pro7
- "Speed – Time is Money" (quiz show, 2002) – host, Pro7
- "Fort Boyard" (adventure game show, 2001–2002) – host, Pro7
- "Champions Day" (prime time family game show, 2001) – host, Sat.1
- "Oscar Red Carpet Show" (2000–2002) – host, Pro7
- "taff" (daily entertainment and news show, live, 1999–2001) – host, Pro7
- "taff extra" (weekly entertainment and news show, 1999) – host, Pro7
- "MTV Europe News" (daily music news show, 1996–1999) – host and producer, MTV
- "MTV News Highlights" (weekly music news show, 1996–1999) – host and producer, MTV
- "Schlag den Raab" (game show, 2011–2015) – host, Pro7
- "Unser Star für Baku" (casting show, 2012) – host, Pro7, Das Erste
- "Joko und Klaas gegen ProSieben" (game show, 2019) – host, Pro7
- "Sorry für alles" (game show, since August 2019) – host, ZDF
- "Joko und Klaas gegen ProSieben" (game show, 2020) – host, Pro7
- "5 Gold Rings" (game show, 2020) - host, Sat.1

=== Voice-over work ===
- 2016: Zootopia (anchorman in the German version)
- 2017: Ferdinand (animal control worker in the German version)
- 2018: Spies in Disguise (as Lance Sterling in the German version)
- 2025: Zootopia 2 (anchorman in the German version)

=== Filmography ===
- "Unser Reigen" – (NDR, 2006)
- "Inga Lindström – Sterne über dem Liljesund" – (ZDF, 2005)
- "The Relic Hunter – The Reel Thing" – (Pro 7, 2000)
- "Klinikum Berlin Mitte" – (Sat.1, Pro 7, 2000)
- "Spezialistenshow" – (ZDF, 2000)

== Radio ==
- "Morning Show" – (1996) OK Radio
- "Nightflight" – (1994–1996) OK Radio
- "Movies" – (1994–1996) OK Radio
