= Gordon Jones (folk musician) =

Gordon Jones (born 21 November 1947), originally from Merseyside, is a Scottish folk musician playing guitar, bodhrán, bouzuki and autoharp and founding member of Silly Wizard. Performed with Silly Wizard during their entire 17 years together as well as composing and producing both music and albums for Silly Wizard, two of which received MRA awards.

== With Silly Wizard ==
Having moved to Edinburgh in his youth to study art, he became involved in the Scottish music scene meeting fellow musicians Bob Thomas and Johnny Cunningham founding Silly Wizard (after many other names), as well as spending some time prior to 1972 running and performing in the Triangle Folk Club in Edinburgh with Silly Wizard band mates Bob Thomas and Johnny Cunningham.

Gordon Jones has performed on the band's eight studio albums and the four live albums, touring with Silly Wizard until 1988.

== Discography ==
- 1976 Silly Wizard
- 1978 Caledonia's Hardy Sons
- 1979 So Many Partings
- 1980 Take the High Road (Single)
- 1981 Wild and Beautiful
- 1983 Kiss the Tears Away
- 1985 Live In America
- 1985 Golden Golden
- 1985 The Best of Silly Wizard
- 1987 A Glint of Silver
- 1988 Live Wizardry
- 2012 Live Again

== After Silly Wizard ==
Gordon Jones is also founder and co-owner of Harbourtown Records with Bob Thomas, another member of Silly Wizard. A minor folk record label with around 50 titles and several prestigious awards (from MRS and Nairn) recognising the quality of the production, most notably for the excellent Frivolous Love. More recently (2010) he has sat on the governing body for the English Folk Dance and Song Society (EFDSS) National Council and performs with The Old Friends Band, who specialise in Cumbrian tunes and dances.
