= List of awards and nominations received by Amy Macdonald =

Amy Macdonald awards and nominations
- Macdonald at the 2026 Radio Regenbogen Awards
Awards and nominations
Award	Wins	Nominations
ECHO Awards	2	4
NRJ Music Awards	0	2
Swiss Music Awards	3	3
Scottish Music Awards	6	1

Totals (Note: Certain award groups do not simply award one winner. They acknowledge several different recipients, have runners-up, and have third place. Since this is a specific recognition and is different from losing an award, runner-up mentions are considered wins in this award tally. For simplification and to avoid errors, each award in this list has been presumed to have had a prior nomination.)
- Wins: 23
- Nominations: 8

This is a list of awards and nominations received by Scottish singer–songwriter Amy Macdonald. As of July 2026, Macdonald has won a combined total of twenty three awards, including six Scottish Music Awards, three Swiss Music Awards, two ECHO Awards and two NRJ Music Awards nominations. She has gained accolades out-with music – in 2013, she was shortlisted in the Scottish Fashion Icon category at the Scottish Fashion Awards 2013. She was shortlisted again in 2014 and won the award.

Macdonald won Best Newcomer at the 2008 Tartan Clef Awards and Best Newcomer at the 2008 Silver Clef Awards. In December 2008 she was voted Scottish Person of the Year" by The Daily Record. Her success continued in 2009, with her debut album This Is the Life and its title track receiving the award for Best International Album and Best International Song at the 2009 Swiss Music Awards respectively. She performed alongside U2 at the 2009 Echo Awards in Germany, where she won the Best International Newcomer award. She also won Best International Album and Best International Song at the 2009 Swiss Music Awards.

In 2010, she won the Best Album Award for A Curious Thing at the annual Tartan Clef awards on 20 November in Glasgow. Additionally, Macdonald won the Best International Album Rock/Pop award with A Curious Thing at the Swiss Music Awards in March 2011. Furthermore, Macdonald won Best International Rock/Pop Female at the 2011 Echo Awards. On 23 August 2013, Macdonald performed at the 46th Sopot International Song Festival in Poland with her songs "This Is the Life" and "Slow It Down". She was awarded there a special prize by the Radio RMF FM.

== Awards and nominations ==
=== Music ===
Award	Year	Category	Result
Echo Awards	2009	Best Newcomer International	Won
Echo Awards	2009	Best International Female	Nominated
Echo Awards	2009	Single of the Year for "This Is the Life"	Nominated
Echo Awards	2011	Best International Rock/Pop Female	Won
Echo Awards	2013	Best International Rock/Pop Female	Nominated
Forth Radio Awards	2007	Best Artist Award	Won
Forth Radio Awards	2018	International Music Icon Award	Won
Forth Radio Awards	2025	Best Artist Award	Won
NRJ Music Awards	2009	NInternational Album of the Year for This Is the Life	Nominated
NRJ Music Awards	2009	International Revolution of the Year	Nominated
Radio Regenbogen Awards	2009	Best Newcomer	Won
Radio Regenbogen Awards	2025	International Artist	Won
RMF FM Awards	2013	Amber Nightingale	Nominated
RMF FM Awards	2013	Special Award	Won
Silver Clef Award	2008	Best Newcomer	Won
Scottish Live Music Awards	2024	Legend Award	Nominated
Scottish Music Awards	2025	Best Album – Is This What You've Been Waiting For?	Won
Scottish Music Awards	2021	Outstanding Achievement Award	Won
Scottish Music Awards	2020	Women In Music Award	Won
Scottish Music Awards	2016	International Award	Won
Scottish Music Awards	2015	King Tut's Songwriting Award	Won
Scottish Music Awards	2007	Breakthrough Award	Won
Swiss Music Awards	2009	Best International Album – This Is the Life	Won
Swiss Music Awards	2009	Best International Song – "This Is the Life"	Won
Swiss Music Awards	2011	Best International Album Rock/Pop – A Curious Thing	Won
Tartan Clef Award	2010	Best Album – A Curious Thing	Won

=== Other ===
Award	Year	Category	Result
Daily Record	2008	Scottish Person of the Year	Won
Scottish Fashion Awards	2013	Scottish Fashion Icon	Nominated
Scottish Fashion Awards	2014	Scottish Fashion Icon	Won
Sorrento Peninsula Awards	2022	International Award	Won
Tennent’s Golden Can Hall of Fame	2019	Golden Can award	Won
