= Kiss the Tears Away =

Studio album by Silly Wizard
- Released: 1983
- Genre: Folk
- Label: Highway Records

Silly Wizard chronology
Wild & Beautiful	Kiss the Tears Away	Live in America

Kiss the Tears Away is the fifth album by Silly Wizard released in 1983 on the Highway Records label in the U.K. and on the Shanachie label in the U.S. This album introduces the song "The Queen of Argyll" and "Golden, Golden" written by Andy M. Stewart.

== Track listing ==
1. "The Queen of Argyll (3:28)"
2. "Golden, Golden (3:55)"
3. "Finlay M. MacRae (3:34)"
4. "The Banks of the Lee (4:29)"
5. "Sweet Dublin Bay (3:31)"
6. "Mo Nighean Donn, Grádh Mo Chridhe (My brown haired maiden, love of my heart) (4:18)"
7. "Banks of the Bann (3:28)"
8. "The Greenfields of Glentown / The Galtee Reel / Bobby Casey's Number Two / Wing Commander Donald MacKenzie's Reel (4:39)"
9. "The Loch Tay Boat Song (5:03)"

== Personnel ==
- Phil Cunningham - Accordion, synthesizers, piano, guitar, mandola, whistles, backing vocals
- Johnny Cunningham - Fiddle
- Martin Hadden - Bass, fretless bass, guitar, string synthesizer
- Gordon Jones - Guitar, bodhrán
- Andy M. Stewart - Lead vocals, tenor banjo
