= Pete Morton =

- Born: 30 July 1964 (age 62); Leicester, England
- Genres: Urban folk
- Occupation: Singer-songwriter
- Instruments: Vocals, guitar
- Years active: 1984–present
- Labels: Harbourtown Records, Fellside Records
- Website: www.petemorton.com

Pete Morton (born 30 July 1964) is an English folksinger-songwriter who lives in London, England. According to fRoots, Morton "is amongst the best that the British roots music scene has produced in living memory." Since 2024, Morton has been a 'performance-only artist' saying that live gigs are more important than anything recorded.

== Biography ==
Morton was born in Leicester, England, on 30 July 1964. He attended Countesthorpe Community College He left school at 16 in 1980. It was during this summer that he discovered folk music, when hearing a friend's father playing a Buffy Sainte-Marie record. This led him to buy an acoustic guitar and learn songs from early 1960s protest singers.

Morton started busking and visiting folk clubs, travelling around the UK and Europe. He began learning traditional songs as well as writing his own songs, mainly of social commentary.

Morton signed to Harbourtown Records in 1987, a label started by Gordon Jones and Bob Thomas of Scottish folk band Silly Wizard. His first album, Frivolous Love, was met with high critical acclaim, of which The Guardian called him 'a revelation', and he was voted the most promising newcomer by FRoots magazine the year after. His second album, One Big Joke (1988), was also positively received and he was referred to in a review by FRoots, as one of the best the British roots scene has produced in living memory.

Throughout the early '90s, Morton toured throughout the US, Canada, and Europe, as well as touring with Roger Wilson (fiddle, vocals, and guitar) and Simon Edwards (button accordion and vocals). They also toured Pakistan, Malaysia, and Singapore for the British Council.

With Courage, Love, and Grace (1994), Morton brought his songwriting back to public attention, as well as 'utilizing his commanding, edgy voice to enhance the power of his songs'. He followed this with a collection of traditional songs on the CD Trespass (1998). Over the next decade, Morton continued touring in North America, Europe, and Australia, and produced a CD with Jo Freya as well as three more CDs of his own songs: Hunting the Heart (2000), Swarthmoor (2003), and Flying an Unknown Flag (2005).

In 2007, Morton left Harbourtown Records to re-work his most requested songs with the album Napoleon Jukebox (2007), followed a year later by Casa Abierta (2008), a collection of songs in 10 different languages, followed by Economy (2011), an album of original songs, produced by Dawson Smith.

Morton then performed as the dancer and singer Geoff Chaucer Junior – a comedy character – performing A Random History of Rock n Roll in Middle English throughout the UK, and also as the master of ceremonies in Mick Ryan's folk musical Here at the Fair, which explores the lives of travelling show people.

With Fellside Recordings, Morton produced The Frappin’ and Ramblin’ Pete Morton (2014), which focused on his 'frap' (folk-rap) style, and in 2015 released The Land of Time. On it he creates 'contemporary folk songs which aren’t afraid to face up to some of the more pressing issues of our time with wit, intelligence, and nuance'. It was included in Folk Radio's 15 best albums of 2015. In Game Of Life (2016), Morton worked with Chester-based band Full House to record a collection of new songs and new versions of his most popular songs.

His last two albums of self-penned songs, A Golden Thread (2020) and Fair Freedom (2024), were self-released and co-produced with Paul Yarrow in Leek, Staffordshire. Viewing these two collections of song as his best, and fulfilling what he wished to achieve as a songwriter, Morton no longer records albums, now concentrating on live performance. Although still writing, new work is included in a Woody Guthrie-like talking blues style 'performance only' show that makes every gig unique to the audience.

== Discography ==
- Frivolous Love (1987)
- One Big Joke (1988)
- Mad World Blues (1992)
- Courage, Love And Grace (1995)
- Jo Freya & Pete Morton (1997)
- Trespass (1998)
- Hunting The Heart (2000)
- Another Train: A Selection From Recordings 1987 – 2001 (2001) – compilation CD
- Swarthmoor (2003)
- Flying An Unknown Flag (2005)
- Napoleon Jukebox (2007) – new performances of 17 best known songs
- Casa Abierta: Ten Songs In Different Tongues, Volume One (2008)
- Economy (2011)
- The Frappin' And Ramblin' Pete Morton (2014)
- The Land Of Time (2015)
- Game of Life (2015)
- A Golden Thread (2020)
- Fair Freedom (2024)
