= Caledonia (song) =

Scottish folk music

Single by Dougie MacLean and Alan Roberts

from the album Caledonia
- Released: 1978
- Recorded: 1977
- Genre: Scottish traditional folk music
- Songwriter: Dougie MacLean

"Caledonia" is a modern Scottish folk ballad written by Dougie MacLean in 1977. The chorus of the song features the lyric "Caledonia, you're calling me, and now I'm going home", the term "Caledonia" itself being a Latin word for Scotland. "Caledonia" has been covered by various artists, and is often dubbed Scotland's "unofficial national anthem".

== Composition ==
MacLean wrote the song in less than 10 minutes on a beach in Brittany, France, feeling homesick for Scotland. He said: “I was in my early 20s and had been busking around with some Irish guys. I was genuinely homesick. I'd always lived in Perthshire. I played it to the guys when I got back to the youth hostel where we were staying and that was the final straw – we all went home the next day." He adds: "It took about 10 minutes but sometimes that's how songs happen. I'm still amazed at how much it has become part of common culture. There's not a pub singer, busker or pipe band that doesn't play it." The song is very similar in its sentiments to a much earlier song called "Jean and Caledonia".

"Caledonia" was first recorded by MacLean and published in his 1979 joint album credited to Alan Roberts and Doug MacLean that also carried the title Caledonia. MacLean plays the song in the key of E using Open C tuning with a capo on the 4th fret.

== Cover versions ==
"Caledonia" has been covered by a great number of artists. The majority of these covers have been by artists from either Scotland or Ireland, and it has been popular amongst artists specialising in Celtic music. There have also been some adaptations by non-Celtic performers.

=== Dolores Keane version ===
A Woman's Heart

Compilation album by various
- Released: July 1992
- Genre: Folk
- Label: Dara
- Producer: Joe O'Reilly

Dolores Keane recorded a very popular cover of the song on her self-titled solo album Dolores Keane in 1988. Dolores' cover of the song also appeared as the second track on A Woman's Heart, a compilation album of twelve tracks performed by six female Irish artists. The album was released in July 1992 and sold over 750,000 copies, more than any other album in Irish chart history and nearly one million copies worldwide.

=== Frankie Miller version ===
"Caledonia"

Single by Frankie Miller
- Released: 1991
- Recorded: 1991
- Genre: Scottish traditional folk music
- Songwriter: Dougie MacLean
- Producer: David Balfe

Music video
- "Caledonia" on YouTube

Initially a minor hit for Dougie MacLean himself, the song's fame had a new boost in 1991 when a cover interpretation sung by Frankie Miller was used in a Tennent's Lager television advert. When it first aired, Miller had only recorded the first verse and the chorus for the advertisement. Following the public reaction to this Miller re-recorded the whole song and released it as a single. A music video was also produced. This recording reached number 45 in March 1991 on the UK Singles Chart.

=== Later cover versions ===
In 1998, it was covered by Belgium's Micha Marah as "Caledonia" and by Norway's Hanne Krogh under the title "Haugalandet" appearing in her album Vestavind.

More recent cover versions include a 2002 recording by Fish (from Marillion fame) in the album Tribute to Franky Miller and the following year by Katie Targett-Adams on her self-titled 2003 album KT-A, a live 2006 recording by the singer/songwriter Paolo Nutini on a special version of his album These Streets and a 2007 cover by Ruth Notman on her album Threads. 2008 saw two new recorded covers: first in an album release by Celtic Woman entitled A New Journey with main vocals by Lisa Kelly and second by singer/songwriter Amy Macdonald as a hidden track on her album This Is the Life. Two more covers followed in 2008, one by Celtic Thunder in their self-titled album Celtic Thunder and by Leon Jackson in his debut album Right Now. In 2009, Ronan Keating recorded his version on his album Winter Songs. Additional covers have been released by Tartan Terrors, Tina Mulrooney, Na Fianna, Julienne Taylor, Snakes in Exile and Jackson Greenhorn, the latter as part of his online demo The Scottish Connection. Nathan Carter recorded it in 2012 in his album Wagon Wheel accompanied by a new music video. Dutch folk duo The Lasses recorded a version of the song on their 2012 debut album "The Lasses". Irish singer/songwriter Wallis Bird recorded a version for the deluxe edition of her 2014 album ARCHITECT. In 2014, British country music duo Ward Thomas covered the song on their 2014 album "From Where We Stand". The Derina Harvey Band included a cover of the song on their 2016 album “Rove and Go”. In 2021, KT Tunstall recorded a version with Alan Cumming and American singer-songwriter Corbin Montenegro also covered the song on his EP Oceans on Fire. In 2022, Jacob Collier recorded a live version of the song in Glasgow during a performance, as part of his Djesse World Tour, and released the recording later that year as part of his Piano Ballads (Live From The Djesse World Tour 2022) album.
In July 2024, The King's Singers performed a Blake Morgan a capella arrangement of the song with Voces8 as an encore to their BBC Proms concert. A rehearsal of the performance was released as a video on their Facebook page. A cover by Scottish singer Nina Nesbitt was released as a single in January 2025, after she covered the song at many of her concerts in Scotland.

=== Lyrics change ===
The original lyrics by Dougie MacLean, and featured on the album Craigie Dhu, include the line "I have kissed the ladies and left them crying". Dolores Keane's version changes this to "I have kissed the fellas and left them sighing". Many later versions, including those by Dougie MacLean, substitute a new line "I have tried and have kept on trying".

== Use in other advertisements ==
The song was featured in an advert on Scottish television for Homecoming Scotland 2009, a campaign by VisitScotland which invited people to come home to Scotland in 2009 on the 250th anniversary of Robert Burns's birth. The advert featured a variety of Scottish actors, singers and celebrities, including Sir Sean Connery, Sir Chris Hoy, Eddi Reader and Lulu, all of whom sang (or spoke, as Connery did) part of the song.

In 2013, a new version of the song was also recorded by Dougie MacLean himself, this time with Dundee band Anderson Mcginty Webster Ward and Fisher, for another Tennent's advert, this time for the launch of Tennent's new product called "Caledonia Best Ale".

== External links and further reading ==
- Robert Ford, Vagabond Songs and Ballads of Scotland (one-volume edition, 1904), pp. 237–239, "Jean and Caledonia" (1 text, 1 tune)
- John Ord, Bothy Songs and Ballads (1930; Reprint edition with introduction by Alexander Fenton printed 1995), p. 116, "Jean and Caledonia" (1 text)
- Roud Folk Song Index #3801
- Lyrics on Dougie MacLean's official website
- SecondHandSongs: "Caledonia"
