= The Best of Silly Wizard =

Studio album by Silly Wizard
- Released: 1985
- Genre: Folk
- Label: Shanachie

Silly Wizard chronology
Golden Golden	The Best of Silly Wizard	A Glint of Silver

The Best of Silly Wizard is an album by Silly Wizard released in 1985 by Shanachie Records. This album has selections from previous recordings by the band.

== Track listing ==
1. "The Valley of Strathmore" – 6:17
2. "Donald McGillavry / O'Neill's Cavalry March" – 4:09
3. "A.A Cameron's Strathspey / Mrs. Martha Knowles / The Pitnacree Ferryman / The New Shillin'" – 4:26
4. "The Fishermen's Song" – 5:53
5. "The Queen of Argyll" – 3:28
6. "Finlay M. MacRae" – 3:36
7. "The Pearl" – 3:54
8. "Isla Waters" – 3:53
9. "Mo Chuachag Laghach (My Kindly Sweetheart)" – 2:27
10. "Broom O' the Cowdenknowes" – 5:24
11. "Green Fields of Glentown / The Galtee Reel / Bobby Casey's Number Two / Wing Commander Donald MacKenzie's Reel" – 4:43

== Personnel ==
- Phil Cunningham – Accordion, whistle, vocals, keyboards, mandola, guitar, synthesizers, electric piano, piano, harmonium
- Johnny Cunningham – Fiddles, vocals, viola
- Andy M. Stewart – Lead vocals, tenor banjo, whistle, mandolin
- Martin Hadden – Electric bass, fretless bass, guitar, harmonium, string synthesizers, piano, electric piano, vocals
- Gordon Jones – Guitar, bodhran, mandola, vocals
- Bob Thomas – Guitar
