= The Schemers (band) =

- Origin: Providence, Rhode Island, U.S.
- Genres: Hard rock
- Years active: 1979–1987
- Label: Big Bubble Records
- Past members: Jimmy Berger; Rene Blais; Mark Cutler; Emerson Torrey

The Schemers was a Providence, Rhode Island, hard rock band that existed between 1979 and 1987. The band was signed to Big Bubble Records.

== History ==
The band's first live show was a support slot for Sam & Dave, and they also supported Jerry Lee Lewis, Ramones, Tom Verlaine, and Dead Kennedys.

The Schemers were the winners of the 1982 WBRU Radio Rock Hunt in Providence and the 1984 Rock 'n' Roll Rumble in Boston. Their single, "Remember," was the number-one song on WBRU for over 10 weeks in early-1982.

Band members from the original lineup included Jimmy Berger, Rene Blais, Emerson Torrey, and lead singer and songwriter Mark Cutler.

Cutler announced his decision to leave the band in 1986, but continued to play with the band in 1987 for their remaining live commitments, the band finally splitting up in January 1987.

Mark Cutler later founded the Raindogs with Darren Hill and Jim Reilly (of Stiff Little Fingers) and Celtic fiddle king Johnny Cunningham, formerly of Silly Wizard. Emerson Torrey joined the band after original guitarist Ty Avolio left in 1987. Cutler also went on to play in Men of Great Courage, the Tiny String Band, Dino Club, and Forever Young.

The Schemers only album was released in 2004; Remember compiled their earlier recordings as well as ten new recordings. The band reformed several times for live performances, including shows in 2010 with Cutler, Berger, and Torrey joined by drummer Bob Guisti and keyboard player Richard Reed. Guisti was replaced by drummer Rick Couto in 2010. The Schemers continue to perform several times a year.

In 2015, The Schemers were inducted into the Rhode Island Music Hall of Fame.

== Discography ==
- "I Want Some Fun"/"That Shadow" 7-inch single, Big Bubble
- Remember CD (2004)
- The Last Beach CD (2015)
