= Border Drive-In Theatre =

Studio album by the Raindogs
- Released: 1991
- Studio: Hot Tin Roof, North Hollywood, California
- Genre: Roots rock, Celtic folk
- Length: 42:37
- Label: Atco
- Producer: Don Gehman

The Raindogs chronology
| Lost Souls (1990) | Border Drive-In Theatre (1991) |

Border Drive-In Theatre is the second album by the Boston-based band the Raindogs, released in 1991. It was the band's final album, in part due to label troubles.

== Production ==
Named after a deserted Canadian drive-in, the album was recorded in Los Angeles in early 1991. It was produced by Don Gehman. Harry Dean Stanton and Iggy Pop contributed to the album. "Let's Work Together" is a cover of the Wilbert Harrison song.

== Critical reception ==
Professional ratings
Review scores
| Source | Rating |
|---|---|
| AllMusic | 3/5 stars |
| Chicago Tribune | 2.5/4 stars |
| Orlando Sentinel | 4/5 stars |

The Chicago Tribune wrote that the band "has risked throwing syncopated, almost-house beats into its rootsy attack... The experiment works beautifully, creating nifty textures that bubble underneath and shimmer on top so invitingly that you're tempted to overlook the almost complete lack of melodies." The Orlando Sentinel noted that "Raindogs seem intent on downplaying their Celtic-folk side and forging ahead with a stronger rock emphasis."

The Richmond Times-Dispatch opined: "Although the Raindogs are not without talent, the band is shameless. Well, maybe not the whole band, but ... lead singer Mark Cutler is a stylistically schizophrenic combination of Tom Petty, a younger Mick Jagger and Karl Wallinger." The Boston Herald concluded that "Johnny Cunningham's fiddle still provides the band's signature touch, but it's a far less forceful element than the hard-slamming drum sound."

== Track listing ==
(All tracks written by Mark Cutler unless stated)

1. "Some Fun" (Mark Cutler, Phil Shenale) - 4:38
2. "Look Out Your Window" - 4:33
3. "Let's Work Together" (Wilbert Harrison) - 3:28
4. "Baby Doll" - 4:49
5. "Carry Your Cross" - 3:56
6. "Stop Shakin' Me Down" - 4:11
7. "I'll Take Care of You" (Mark Cutler, Johnny Cunningham, Phil Shenale) - 4:24
8. "Dance of the Freaks" - 4:05
9. "Hope You're Satisfied" - 4:13
10. "I'd Call That Love" - 4:23

== Personnel ==
- Mark Cutler – lead vocals, guitar
- Johnny Cunningham – electric and acoustic violin
- Jim Reilly – drums
- Darren Hill – bass
- Emerson Torrey – guitar, vocals
- Phil Shenale – keyboards
- Harry Dean Stanton – speaking part on "Some Fun"
- Iggy Pop – speaking part on "Dance of the Freaks"
