= A Glint of Silver =

Studio album by Silly Wizard
- Released: 1986
- Genre: Folk
- Label: Green Linnet

Silly Wizard chronology
The Best of Silly Wizard (1985)	A Glint of Silver (1986)	Live Wizardry (1988)

Professional ratings
Review scores
Source	Rating
AllMusic	3/5 stars

A Glint of Silver is an album by Silly Wizard released in 1986 on the Green Linnet Records label. This is final studio album recorded by the band.

== Track listing ==
1. "Roarin' Donald/The Man Who Shot the Windmill/A Glint of Silver" – 4:19
2. "The Secret Portrait/Wha'll Be King But Cherlie?" – 6:15
3. "Lover's Heart" – 5:13
4. "When Summer Ends" – 4:20
5. "The Chill Eastern Winds" – 6:02
6. "Willie Archer" – 3:36
7. "Simon MacKenzie's Welcome to His Twin Sisters/Farewell to "The Heb"" – 3:27
8. "The Blackbird of Sweet Avondale" – 4:42

== Personnel ==
- Phil Cunningham – Accordion, whistle, keyboards, vocals
- Johnny Cunningham – Fiddle, mandolin
- Andy M. Stewart – Vocals, tenor banjo
- Martin Hadden – Bass
