= The Raindogs =

American rock band

The Raindogs were a band formed in Boston, United States, around 1985 after several members had disbanded the rock band The Schemers. The Rhode Island–based Schemers had previously won the Providence Rock Hunt and the Boston Rock Rumble band competitions, and their single, Remember was widely played on Providence, Rhode Island FM radio stations.The Raindogs combined Celtic and American music to form their own hybrid of rock and roll. Based in Boston, the band was made up of Mark Cutler, Emerson Torrey, members of recently disbanded New Orleans band Red Rockers, Darren Hill and Jim Reilly (also of Irish punk band Stiff Little Fingers), and Johnny Cunningham, formerly of Silly Wizard.

The Raindogs toured throughout the United States with Warren Zevon, Don Henley, and Bob Dylan and were noted for their incendiary live performances.

== Discography ==
The group released two albums on Atco Records:

- Lost Souls (1990). Produced by Pete Henderson and the Raindogs.
- Border Drive-In Theatre (1991). Produced by Don Gehman. The album features spoken word performances by Harry Dean Stanton and Iggy Pop.

== Personnel ==
List of band members:

- Johnny Cunningham – fiddle and mandolin
- Mark Cutler – guitar and vocals
- Darren Hill – bass
- Jim Reilly – drums
- Emerson Torrey (replaced Ty Avolio) – guitar and vocals

Johnny Cunningham died in 2003. Mark Cutler has several solo CDs on independent labels, and performs solo and with his bands The Schemers, Men of Great Courage and Forever Young, (Neil Young tribute project). Darren Hill has a management company called Ten Pin Management and in 2011, he opened an antique/memorabilia store, POP Emporium, in East Greenwich, Rhode Island where he lives. The store later moved to Providence and sometimes hosts shows. Jim Reilly lives in Belfast, Northern Ireland. Emerson Torrey owns a recording studio and performs with Mark Cutler.
