= Lost Souls (The Raindogs album) =

Studio album by the Raindogs
- Released: 1990
- Studios: The Outpost, Stoughton, Massachusetts
- Genres: Folk rock, roots rock, Celtic
- Length: 44:02
- Label: Atco
- Producers: Peter Henderson, the Raindogs

The Raindogs chronology
Lost Souls (1990)	Border Drive-In Theatre (1991)

Lost Souls is the debut album by the folk/roots rock band the Raindogs, released in 1990 on Atco Records. Written by lead singer Mark Cutler and presenting a hybrid roots rock sound with Celtic elements, Lost Souls drew critical attention but was not a commercial success.

== Critical reception ==
Professional ratings
Review scores
Source	Rating
AllMusic	4.5/5 stars
Calgary Herald	C
Chicago Tribune	3/4 stars
The Rolling Stone Album Guide	2.5/5 stars

The Los Angeles Times thought that the "lilting yet propulsive fiddle gusts, swirling through the basic guitar-rock architecture, give Raindogs both sweetness and bite." The Orlando Sentinel deemed the album "a solid effort [on which] none of the songs really stood out." The Washington Post called it "catchy but a little cautious."

AllMusic wrote that "Lost Souls is perfectly played material and an interesting debut, but there's not enough personality to send this over the top." The Rolling Stone Album Guide declared the album to be "a perfectly unremarkable example of foursquare folk-rock traditionalism."

== Track listing ==
(All tracks written by Mark Cutler)

1. "I'm Not Scared" 3:23
2. "May Your Heart Keep Beating" 3:50
3. "Phantom Flame" 3:31
4. "The Higher Road" 3:04
5. "Too Many Stars" 3:19
6. "Nobody's Getting Out" 3:18
7. "Cry for Mercy" 3:37
8. "Adventure" 3:04
9. "This Is the Place" 3:57
10. "Under the Rainbow" 3:59
11. "I Believe" 4:17
12. "Something Wouldn't Be the Same" 4:43

== Personnel ==
- Mark Cutler – lead vocals/guitar
- Johnny Cunningham – fiddle/mandolin
- Jim Reilly – drums
- Darren Hill – bass
- Emerson Torrey – guitar/vocals
- Jim Fitting – harmonica
- Gordon Beadle/Scott Shetler/Curtis Stone/Myanna Pontoppidan – horns
- Richard Reed/Peter Henderson – keyboards
- Cheryl Hodge – background vocals
- Tony Cuffe – whistles
- Sa Davies – percussion
- Ralph Tufo – accordion
