= Live Wizardry =

Live album by Silly Wizard
- Released: 1988
- Recorded: 1983
- Genre: Celtic, Traditional, Folk
- Length: 64:20
- Label: Green Linnet

Silly Wizard chronology
A Glint of Silver (1986)	Live Wizardry (1988)	Live Again (2012)

Live Wizardry is an album by Scottish folk band Silly Wizard, recorded live in concert at Sanders Theatre, Harvard University in Cambridge, Massachusetts, United States in 1983. Live Wizardry was released by Green Linnet Records in 1988 and contained all but two of the tracks released in 1985 on the live albums Golden Golden and Live in America. The omitted tracks are both instrumental medleys: "Mac's Fancy / The Cliffs Of Moher / "The Rose Of Red Hill / Clootie Dumplings / The Laird O' Drumblair / Sleepy Maggie" from Golden Golden and "The Green Fields Of Glentown / The Galtee / Bobby Casey's Number Two / A.B. Corsie (The Lad From Orkney)" from Live in America.

== Track listing ==
1. "Queen of Argyll"
2. "Mrs. Martha Knowles / The Pitnacree Ferryman / The New Bob"
3. "The Parish of Dunkeld / The Curlew"
4. "The Valley of Strathmore"
5. "Miss Shepherd / Sweeny's Buttermilk / McGlinchy's Reels"
6. "The Ramblin' Rover"
7. "Blackbird"
8. "Scarce O'Tatties / Lyndhurst"
9. "The Banks of the Lee"
10. "Donald McGillavry"
11. "Golden, Golden"
12. "The Humours of Tulla / Toss the Feathers / Saint Anne's Reel / Lexy McAskill / The Limerick Lasses / Jean's Reel"
13. "Broom of the Cowdenknowes"

== Personnel ==
- Phil Cunningham - Accordion, vocals, Mandola, flute
- Johnny Cunningham - Fiddle
- Andy M. Stewart - Banjo, lead vocals
- Gordon Jones - Guitar, vocals, Bodhran
- Martin Haddon - Bass, synthesiser

== Release history ==
Year	Type	Label
1993	CD	Green Linnet
1993	CS	Green Linnet
1993	LP	Green Linnet
1988	LP	Green Linnet
