= So Many Partings =

Studio album by Silly Wizard
- Released: 1979
- Genre: Folk
- Length: 36:02
- Label: Highway Records

Silly Wizard chronology
Caledonia's Hardy Sons (1978)	So Many Partings (1979)	Wild & Beautiful (1981)

Professional ratings
Review scores
Source	Rating
AllMusic	3/5 stars

So Many Partings is the third album by Silly Wizard released in 1979 on the Highway Records label in the U.K. and 1980 on the Shanachie label in the U.S. On this album the songs "The Valley Of Strathmore" and "The Highland Clearances" were written by Andy M. Stewart.

== Track listing ==
1. "Scarce O'Tatties / Lyndhurst"
2. "The Valley Of Strathmore"
3. "Bridget O'Malley (Brid Og Ni Mhaille)"
4. "A.A. Cameron's Strathspey / Mrs. Martha Knowles / The Pitnacree Ferryman / The New Shillin'"
5. "Donald McGillavry / O'Neill's Cavalry March"
6. "The Highland Clearances"
7. "Miss Catherine Brosnan"
8. "Wi' My Dog and Gun"
9. "Miss Shepherd / Sweeney's Buttermilk / McGlinchey's Reels"

== Personnel ==
- Phil Cunningham - Accordion, tin whistles, Overton low D whistle, Moog synthesizer, string synthesizer, acoustic and electric pianos, vocals
- Johnny Cunningham - Fiddle, vocals
- Martin Hadden - Electric bass, harmonium, guitar
- Gordon Jones - Guitar, mandola, bodhran
- Andy M. Stewart - Lead vocals, tenor banjo
