= Fenian (disambiguation) =

Fenian may refer to:

- Fenians: fraternal organisations dedicated to the establishment of an independent Irish Republic in the 19th and early 20th century
  - Fenian raids: a series of skirmishes between the Fenians and British Canada
  - Fenian Rising: an Irish rebellion against Britain in 1867, organized by a Fenian group
- Fenian (horse): a 19th-century American racehorse
- The Fenians: a California-based Celtic rock band
- Fenian Ram: an early submarine
- Fianna: warrior bands in Irish and Scottish mythology
  - Fenian Cycle: a group of Irish myths
- Fenian, a slur used for Catholics in Ireland and Scotland, and sometimes specifically for supporters of Celtic F.C.
- Fenian (album), 2026 release by hip-hop trio Kneecap
  - "Fenian", a song from the album

== See also ==
- Fianna (disambiguation)
