= Fianna (disambiguation) =

The Fianna are a band of heroes in Irish mythology.

Fianna or Fiana can also refer to:

- Fianna Fáil, a political party in Ireland
- Fianna Éireann, the name of several Irish republican youth movements
- Na Fianna GAA, a Dublin-based Gaelic Athletic Association club
- Fianna, a tribe of werewolves in the White Wolf Game Studio roleplaying game Werewolf: The Apocalypse.
- Fiana (grape), an Italian wine grape that is also known as Fiano
- Na Fianna (band), an Irish band
- Fianna Hills, a country club and subdivision in Fort Smith, Arkansas
