= Mr Rock & Roll =

2007 single by Amy Macdonald

Single by Amy Macdonald

from the album This Is the Life
- B-side: "What Is Love"; "Somebody New"
- Released: 16 July 2007
- Length: 3:35
- Label: Vertigo; Melodramatic
- Songwriter: Amy Macdonald
- Producer: Pete Wilkinson

Amy Macdonald singles chronology
"Poison Prince" (2007)	"Mr Rock & Roll" (2007)	"L.A." (2007)

Music video
- "Mr Rock & Roll" on YouTube

iTunes digital single cover
- iTunes digital cover

Music video
- "Mr Rock & Roll" on YouTube

"Mr. Rock & Roll" is a song by Scottish singer-songwriter Amy Macdonald. The song is the first track on Macdonald's debut album, This Is the Life. It was her first full single after the limited online release of "Poison Prince" and was released physically in the United Kingdom on 16 July 2007.

The song is to date her most successful in the United Kingdom, charting at No. 12 on the UK Singles Chart and topping the Scottish Singles Chart. In 2008, following the European success of her single "This Is the Life", "Mr. Rock & Roll" entered the top 10 in Belgium, the Czech Republic, the Netherlands, and Switzerland. This song was featured on the BBC Olympics 2008 programming, where it was played as the show looked over the day's events.

== Background ==
Macdonald wrote the song while she was still a teenager, before signing her first major recording contract with Vertigo Records and Melodramatic. The song was among the early compositions included on the demo CD that she submitted in response to an advertisement placed in NME by producers Pete Wilkinson and Sarah Erasmus, who were seeking new songwriters. Wilkinson later recalled being immediately impressed by Macdonald's songwriting, specifically highlighting both "Mr. Rock & Roll" and "This Is the Life" as songs that convinced him to work with her.

Discussing her debut album in an official podcast released by Melodramatic Records, Macdonald explained that the songs were largely drawn from real-life observations and people she encountered while growing up in Scotland. She described "Mr. Rock & Roll" as reflecting her fascination with individuals who pursued image and celebrity culture, contrasting them with people who appreciated music for its own sake.

== Recording ==
Following the partnership with Wilkinson and Erasmus, Macdonald spent approximately eight to nine months recording demo versions of her material in Wilkinson's home studio before securing a recording contract with Vertigo Records. Much of the material that ultimately appeared on her debut album This Is the Life, including "Mr. Rock & Roll", was refined during these sessions before being professionally recorded for the album.

The final recording was produced by Pete Wilkinson and mixed by Bob Clearmountain. Instrumentation combines acoustic guitar with folk rock and pop rock influences, featuring a full backing band and string arrangements conducted by Audrey Riley. According to the official recording credits, Macdonald performed lead vocals and acoustic guitar, with Wilkinson contributing keyboards, percussion, piano and string arrangements. Additional musicians included Jamie Sefton (bass), Adam Falkner (drums and percussion), Jolyon Dixon (electric guitar) and Sarah Erasmus (backing vocals), while the string section featured Laura Melhuish, Jonathan Hill, Richard George, Susan Dench and Chris Tumbling.

== Release ==
"Mr. Rock & Roll" became the second single released from This Is the Life on 16 July 2007 and marked Macdonald's commercial breakthrough in the United Kingdom, helping establish the success of her debut album before its wider international release. In the United Kingdom, on 15 July 2007, "Mr Rock & Roll" debuted at No. 79 on the UK Singles Chart on downloads alone. Following its physical release the following day, the single jumped up to No. 12 on the same chart while also debuting at No. 1 on the Scottish Singles Chart, becoming Macdonald's highest-charting hit in the UK. It remained in the UK top 100 for 16 weeks and ended the year at No. 126 on the chart's year-end listing.

In early 2008, Macdonald's fourth single, "This Is the Life", became a chart-topping hit across Europe, and "Mr Rock & Roll" was released as the follow-up single on 18 March 2008, becoming a top-10 hit in Flanders (No. 4), the Czech Republic (No. 10), the Netherlands (No. 3), Switzerland (No. 3), and Wallonia (No. 7). It also entered the top 40 in Austria, Germany, Norway, and Sweden. The single was released in the United States on 19 August 2008 but did not chart. It has received gold certifications in the United Kingdom, Belgium and Germany.

== Music video ==
The music video consists of Macdonald playing a guitar in a white room. Pictures of her and a man and another woman walking in town are also seen.

== Track listings ==
UK CD single

1. "Mr. Rock & Roll"
2. "Somebody New"

UK 7-inch single

A. "Mr. Rock & Roll"
B. "What Is Love"

European CD single

1. "Mr. Rock and Roll"
2. "A Wish for Something More"
3. "Let's Start a Band"

== Charts ==
=== Weekly charts ===
Chart (2007–2009)	Peak position
Austria (Ö3 Austria Top 40)	19
Belgium (Ultratop 50 Flanders)	4
Belgium (Ultratop 50 Wallonia)	7
Czech Republic Airplay (ČNS IFPI)	10
Germany (GfK)	21
Netherlands (Dutch Top 40)	3
Netherlands (Single Top 100)	7
Norway (VG-lista)	14
Scotland Singles (Official Charts)	1
Slovakia Airplay (ČNS IFPI)	76
Sweden (Sverigetopplistan)	31
Switzerland (Schweizer Hitparade)	3
UK Singles (Official Charts)	12

=== Year-end charts ===
Chart (2007)	Position
UK Singles (OCC)	126

Chart (2008)	Position
Austria (Ö3 Austria Top 40)	65
Belgium (Ultratop 50 Flanders)	62
Germany (Media Control GfK)	53
Netherlands (Dutch Top 40)	37
Netherlands (Single Top 100)	32
Switzerland (Schweizer Hitparade)	14

Chart (2009)	Position
Belgium (Ultratop 50 Flanders)	65
Belgium (Ultratop 50 Wallonia)	57

== Certifications ==
Region	Certification	Certified units/sales
Belgium (BRMA)	Gold	25,000^{*}
Germany (BVMI)	Gold	150,000^{‡}
United Kingdom (BPI)	Gold	400,000^{‡}
^{*} Sales figures based on certification alone.^{‡} Sales+streaming figures based on certification alone.
