= Poison Prince =

- Re-release cover (2008)

Single by Amy Macdonald

from the album This Is the Life
- A-side: "Poison Prince"
- B-side: "Rock Bottom"
- Released: 7 May 2007 (UK); 19 May 2008 (UK Re-Release); 19 June 2009 (GER)
- Recorded: 2007
- Genre: Indie rock, alternative rock, folk rock
- Songwriter(s): Amy Macdonald
- Producer(s): Pete Wilkinson

Amy Macdonald singles chronology
"Poison Prince" (2007)	"Mr Rock & Roll" (2007)

Re-Release singles chronology
"Run" (2008)	""Poison Prince" (re-release)" (2008)	"Don't Tell Me That It's Over" (2010)

Music video
- "Poison Prince" on YouTube

Alternative cover
- Limited release cover (2007)

"Poison Prince" is the first single from Scottish singer-songwriter Amy MacDonald's debut album, This Is the Life, and charted at number 136 on the UK Singles Chart in 2007. Its initial limited release was on 7 May 2007, and it was later re-released 19 May 2008. The lyrics were based on the life of Babyshambles and The Libertines singer Pete Doherty, and were written as an ode to the troubled musician.

== Limited release ==
"Poison Prince" was initially offered as a limited online-only release, and was included as the third track on her debut album This Is The Life, released 7 May 2007. The music video features Amy performing in a nightclub and walking around various locations in Glasgow.

== Re-release ==
On 19 May 2008, a year and 12 days after the limited release was released, a new music video for the song "Poison Prince" was released. The video was filmed at her Rock Against Racism show in Troon, South Ayrshire, Scotland.

== Track listings ==
CD single

1. "Poison Prince" – 3:28
2. "Rock Bottom" – 3:44

Digital download

1. "Poison Prince" – 3:28
2. "Footballer's Wife" – 5:06
3. "Rock Bottom" – 3:44

CD single (2009, Germany)

1. "Poison Prince" – 3:28
2. Multimedia: "Poison Prince (2nd video)"

== Charts ==
Chart (2007)	Peak position
UK Singles (OCC)	136
Chart (2008)	Peak position
Re-Release
Switzerland (Schweizer Hitparade)	58
UK Singles (OCC)	148
Chart (2009)	Peak position
Germany (GfK)	66
