= Run (Amy Macdonald song) =

Single by Amy Macdonald

from the album This Is the Life
- A-side: "Run"
- B-side: "Rock N Roll Star"
- Released: 3 March 2008; 20 February 2009 (Germany)
- Recorded: 2008
- Studio: Brookland Road Studio, Soho Recording Studios (London)
- Genre: Indie rock, alternative rock, soft rock
- Length: 3:48
- Label: Vertigo Records, Melodramatic
- Songwriter: Amy Macdonald
- Producer: Pete Wilkinson

Amy Macdonald singles chronology
"This Is the Life" (2007)	"Run" (2008)	""Poison Prince" Re-Release" (2008)

"Run" is a single released by Scottish singer Amy Macdonald, released as the fifth single released from her debut album, This Is the Life (2007). The single was released via Macdonald's record label Vertigo and Melodramatic, and was written by Macdonald and produced by Pete Wilkinson.

== Background ==
Macdonald has said that she wrote "Run" following seeing American band The Killers perform in Glasgow. Macdonald claimed at the time via her official MySpace page "The Killers were amazing, as usual. I felt so inspired watching them". She claimed that "my absolute dream in life would be to do something with The Killers. They are one of my favourite bands. I think out of a lot of bands and artists around nowadays very few will still be around in 20 years time. The Killers will definitely be one of them". She also described lead singer of The Killers, Brandon Flowers, as "absolutely mesmorising as a performer".

== Release and reception ==
"Run" was released on 3 March 2008 as the fifth single from Macdonald's debut studio album, This is the Life (2007). It was released via Melodramatic Records and Vertigo Records. Dave Simpson, writing in The Guardian, said the song sounds "euphoric", claiming that it "sounds like 10,000 Maniacs plus The Cranberries". "Run" was one of three tracks which was re–recorded by Macdonald for inclusion on her 2022 extended play release Don't Tell Me That It's Over.

== Commercial performance ==
Upon its release, "Run" failed to match the success of Macdonald's previous releases such as "Mr Rock & Roll" and "This is the Life" in the United Kingdom, where it debuted at number seventy five on the official UK Singles Charts, spending one week within the Top 100 before falling out of the charts completely. In her native Scotland, it fared somewhat better, peaking at number sixteen on the official Scottish Singles Charts. Elsewhere in Europe, it performed favourably in continental European music markets, such as in Germany, where it spent a total of nine weeks on the German Singles Charts, following a peak position of number thirty six. In the Netherlands, it peaked at number ninety-six, and spent two weeks on the singles charts. In Belgium, it reached number fourteen on the Ultratip Bubbling Under Flanders charts.

== Track listing ==
2-Track

1. "Run" 03:48
2. "Rock 'n' Roll Star (Acoustic Version)" 02:22

Maxi (Germany)

1. "Run" 03:48
2. "Youth of Today (Live from SWR3 New Pop Festival 2008)" 04:02
3. "Dancing in the Dark (Live from SWR3 New Pop Festival 2008)" 03:27
4. "Run" (Videoclip)

Digital Download – EP

1. "Run" 3:48
2. "Dancing in the Dark"
3. "Run" (Live at Barrowland Ballroom)
4. "Run" (Steve Cradock version)

== Music video ==
The music video for "Run" features Macdonald walking through a forest at night.

== Charts ==
Macdonald's single "Run" was released on 3 March and jumped in the top 75 at number 75, next week it was knocked out of the top 75. Run charted at #36 in Germany.

Chart	Peak position
Germany (GfK)	36
Scotland Singles (Official Charts)	16
UK Singles (Official Charts)	75
Belgium (Ultratip Bubbling Under Flanders)	14
Netherlands (Single Top 100)	96
