= Perthshire Amber =

- Genre: Multiple
- Dates: November
- Locations: Perthshire, Scotland
- Years active: 2005 - 2016
- Founders: Dougie MacLean
- Attendance: 9,000
- Website: www.perthshireamber.com

Perthshire Amber is a music festival that took place annually in central Scotland from 2005 to 2016. First organised by Dougie MacLean as a two-day event in 2005, within a few years it had grown to a 10-day event. The 2016 event scaled back to four days in length and the festival is not scheduled to be held in 2017.

== History ==
In 2005 it began as a two-day event. It was sold-out in its third year. The fifth festival in 2009 was held over ten days.

In 2014, around 9000 visitors were expected to attend shows at 25 venues, featuring more than 350 musicians.

In 2016, the 12th year the festival was held, it was scaled back to four days.

After the 2016 festival, MacLean announced that the organisers would take a break and that there would not be a festival held in 2017.
