= New Boots =

Studio album by Wallis Bird
- Released: 24 July 2009 (Ireland); 5 March 2010 (Austria/Switzerland); 12 March 2010 (Germany/Benelux), 5 April 2010 (France)
- Recorded: 2008/2009
- Genre: Acoustic rock
- Label: Rubyworks (Ireland); Columbia Records (Rest of Europe)
- Producer: Marcus Wuest, Wallis Bird

Wallis Bird chronology
Spoons (2007)	New Boots (2009)	Wallis Bird (2012)

New Boots is the second album by Irish singer-songwriter, Wallis Bird. The album was released on 24 July 2009 in Ireland under the Rubyworks label and later received a wider European release in March 2010 in Austria, Switzerland, Germany, Luxembourg, the Netherlands and Belgium. The album was released in France in April 2010. It released outside Ireland through Columbia Records.

== Promotion ==
Bird appeared on RTÉ Two's Band from School in December 2009. She also appeared on Austrian music channel Go TV to promote the album on 15 March 2010.

== Track listing ==
2009 original release

1. "Can Opener"
2. "Travelling Bird"
3. "To My Bones"
4. "Meal of Convenience"
5. "Made of Sugar"
6. "An Idea About Mary"
7. "When We Kissed the World Fell in Love!"
8. "LaLaLand"
9. "Berlin"
10. "Measuring Cities"
11. "Your Morning Dram"

2010 limited edition

1. "Can Opener"
2. "Travelling Bird"
3. "To My Bones"
4. "Meal of Convenience"
5. "Made of Sugar"
6. "An Idea About Mary"
7. "When We Kissed the World Fell in Love!"
8. "LaLaLand"
9. "Berlin"
10. "Measuring Cities"
11. "Your Morning Dram"
12. "Your Daddy"
13. "LaLaLand" (acoustic)
14. "An Idea About Mary" (acoustic)
15. "Measuring Cities" (acoustic)
16. "To My Bones" (live version)

== New Boots Tour ==
Bird toured Ireland, France and Belgium extensively throughout 2009. In early 2010 she announced live tour dates for other parts of Europe including Germany, Austria and Switzerland.

== Awards ==
New Boots won Wallis Bird the title of Best Irish Female Artist at the 2010 Meteor Ireland Music Awards.
