= L.A. (Amy Macdonald song) =

Single by Amy Macdonald

from the album This Is the Life
- Released: 15 October 2007 (UK)
- Recorded: 2007
- Genre: Indie rock, alternative rock, folk rock
- Songwriters: Amy Macdonald, Pete Wilkinson
- Producer: Pete Wilkinson

Amy Macdonald singles chronology
"Mr Rock & Roll" (2007)	"L.A." (2007)	"This Is the Life" (2007)

Music video
- "L.A." on YouTube

"L.A." is a single released by Scottish singer Amy Macdonald, which was released in October 2007 as the third single from her debut studio album This Is the Life (2007). A moderate success, it reached #48 in the UK Singles Charts, and gain considerable success in Scotland, peaking at number five on the Scottish Singles Charts.

== Background ==
During an interview with BBC Berkshire, Macdonald said that the writing of "L.A." was inspired by her admiration for actor Jake Gyllenhaal. She said "well I was just thinking and I thought everyone has somebody that they idolize - be it an actor or a sports player or a singer or whatnot. But I think in general that people should value their own dreams and their own achievements, even if we don't do things as great as being in a Hollywood blockbuster. Just be proud of what we achieve ourselves".

The music video of "L.A." consists of Macdonald in travelling in a van, singing and playing a guitar, following by her then performing live. The music video for "L.A." was filmed in Málaga in Spain.

== Release and reception ==
"L.A" was released as the third single from Macdonald's debut studio album This is the Life (2007) on 15 October 2007. It was released as a CD single via her record label, Melodramatic Records and Vertigo Records. Manchester Evening News said that "the first thing to strike you from an Amy Macdonald record is her booming voice that surely couldn’t come from a shy and demure 20-year-old", however, claimed "L.A." "is a completely forgettable showcase for it, rolling along the same yawnsome middle of the road path as fellow Scot KT Tunstall and Sandi Thom, and fails to make any lasting impression beyond vaguely pleasant background noise".

== Commercial performance ==
In her native Scotland, "L.A." performed strongly on the Scottish Singles Charts, peaking at number five. This was her second top five single in Scotland, following her previous single "Mr Rock & Roll" reaching number one on the Scottish Singles Charts. In the United Kingdom, it fell short of the Top 40 of the official UK Singles Charts, reaching a peak of forty eight, spending a total of two weeks on the UK Singles Charts before falling out of the UK Top 100.

== Track listings ==
CD single (1)
No.	Title	Length
1.	"L.A."	4:08
2.	"Mr. Brightside" (Live from King Tut's)	4:15

CD single (2)
No.	Title	Length
1.	""L.A.""	4:08
2.	"Mr Rock & Roll" (Live from King Tut's)	4:15
3.	"Footballer's Wife" (Live from King Tut's)	3:32

7" Vinyl
No.	Title	Length
1.	"L.A."	4:08
2.	"Footballer's Wife]" (Live from King Tut's)	3:32

Credits

By the credits as referred from the inner notes of the single released, references via Discogs.

- Backing Vocals – Sarah Erasmus
- Bass Guitar – Jamie Sefton
- Conductor, Cello – Audrey Riley
- Drums, Percussion – Adam Falkner
- Electric Guitar – Seton Daunt
- Engineer [Assistant Recording] – Guy Katsav
- Engineer [Assistant], Edited By, Other [Pro-tools] – Beatriz Artola
- Executive Producer – Paul Adams
- Mixed By – Bob Clearmountain
- Percussion, Piano, Keyboards, Programmed By, Arranged By [Strings] – Pete Wilkinson
- Producer [Additional], Engineer – Joe Fields (2)
- Viola – Chris Tumbling*, Susan Dench*
- Violin – Jonathan Hill, Laura Melhuish, Richard George
- Vocals, Acoustic Guitar, Backing Vocals – Amy Macdonald
- Written-By – Amy Macdonald
- Written-By, Producer – Pete Wilkinson

== Charts ==
Chart (2007)	Peak position
Scotland Singles (OCC)	5
UK Singles (OCC)	48
