= GiveWay =

GiveWay is a Scottish quartet that performs a mix of traditional and new songs. The members are sisters from outside Edinburgh: Fiona Johnson (fiddle, guitar, piano, whistle, and vocals), Kirsty Johnson (piano, accordion, and vocals), and twins Amy Johnson (drums and accordion) and Mairi Johnson (piano/keyboard, bass, and vocals). The four were all born within four years.

They won a Danny Award from the Scottish music festival's Celtic Connections in 2001 and the Young Folk Award from BBC 2 Radio. Fiona and Kirsty have both attended The Royal Scottish Academy of Music and Drama (now the Royal Conservatoire of Scotland).

Their three full-length albums are "Full Steam Ahead" (2003), "Inspired" (2005), and "Lost In This Song" (2009). Guest appearances on their albums have included Ross Hamilton, Phil Cunningham (who has also written songs on one album and produced "Inspired" and "Lost In This Song"), Mairi Campbell, Robert McFall, and Su-a Lee. They have also performed songs written by John McCusker. In addition to their studio work and individual concerts, GiveWay has performed live at the Cambridge Folk Festival, the Tonder Festival in Denmark, Celtic Colours, and on the BBC show Hogmanay Live.
