= Wallis Bird (album) =

Studio album by Wallis Bird
- Released: 9 March 2012
- Recorded: 2011–12
- Genre: Acoustic rock
- Label: Rubyworks (Ireland, UK); Karakter Worldwide (Germany, Austria and Switzerland)
- Producer: Marcus Wuest, Wallis Bird

Wallis Bird chronology
New Boots (2009)	Wallis Bird (2012)	Architect (2014)

Wallis Bird is the self-titled third album by Wallis Bird, which was released in Ireland, Germany, Austria and Switzerland on 9 March 2012. The album is released in the United Kingdom on 12 March 2012. The first single "Encore" was released on 2 March 2012. The music video debuted on 1 February 2012. The video was shot in Berlin. All songs on the album were written by Bird and produced by Marcus Wuest.

== Promo ==
For the launch of the album for promotion purposes Wallis featured in the film, Encore: The movie. The movie was filmed in summer 2011 in Berlin, Germany. The music documentary was produced by Phillip Kaessbohrer and features behind the scenes of the making of Wallis' third album. It also features live performances and an exclusive airing of the new tracks which feature on the album. The movie music documentary also features members of Wallis' band including Aoife O'Sullivan. To promote the album in Ireland, Bird did a number of live performances on Irish radio and television. She performed "Encore" on Today FM on 22 February 2012. On 2 March 2012, Bird performed "Encore" on RTÉ One's The Late Late Show.

== Track listing ==
1. "Dress My Skin and Become What I'm Supposed To"
2. "I Am So Tired of That Line"
3. "Encore"
4. "Take Me Home"
5. "In Dictum"
6. "Ghosts of Memories"
7. "Heartbeating City"
8. "Who's Listening Now"
9. "But I'm Still Here, I'm Still Here"
10. "Feathered Pocket"
11. "Polarised"

== Chart position ==
The album debuted at number 11 on the Irish Albums Chart. It also entered the Top 100 Album chart in both Germany and Austria.

== Tour 2012 ==
Between March and July 2012 Wallis toured Europe, beginning the tour in her native Ireland on 7 March 2012. The tour continued to Germany on 20 March, before moving onto Austria, Belgium, Netherlands, France, United Kingdom, Switzerland and Italy.
