= Mairi Campbell =

Scottish folk singer

- Born: 1965 (age 60–61); Edinburgh, Scotland
- Genres: folk music, Scottish music
- Instruments: Viola, fiddle, piano, vocals
- Years active: 1989 – present
- Spouse: David Francis
- Website: mairicampbell.scot

Mairi Campbell (born 1965) is a Scottish folk singer and musician. Campbell's songs and music range from the everyday to the universal, both in sound and subject matter.

Campbell's awards include Scots Singer of the Year, Female Musician of the Year, Neil Gow Composition of the Year, and Tutor of the Year.

Campbell and co-creator Kath Burlinson have created three solo multi-disciplinary theatre shows, Living Stone (premieres in August 2024), Auld Lang Syne (2018) and Pulse (2015), as part of a trilogy. Campbell's theatre work is a response to personal stories and cultural concerns.

Campbell is one half of the duo The Cast, whose version of the Robert Burns poem "Auld Lang Syne" featured in the movie Sex and the City. Campbell is also a member of the ceilidh band The Occasionals, and is a guest musician with the baroque ensemble Concerto Caledonia.

== Early life and music ==
Campbell was born and raised in Morningside, Edinburgh. She was brought up alongside her three sisters by their mother, the artist Marjorie Campbell and their father Archie, an academic at Napier University. Her mother and father ensured that all four sisters had a strong grounding in music. The sisters formed their own string quartet when Campbell was 11.

Campbell studied the viola with Michael Beeston at The City of Edinburgh Music School from age 16. She went on to study with Csaba Erelyi at Guildhall School of Music in London where she was penalised for playing her own composition in her final exam.

== Music career ==
Campbell was a member of the Kreisler String Orchestra, an award-winning conductorless string orchestra, from 1989 to 1994. However she felt a strong hankering for traditional music and felt the need to "come home" to her own cultural roots.

In 1991 Campbell visited Cape Breton Island in Nova Scotia, Canada. This marked a turning point and the start of Campbell's apprenticeship to traditional fiddle and Scots song. Over the next few years she taught step dancing and fiddle across Scotland and for the Scots Music Group.

The accordion player and multi-instrumentalist Freeland Barbour took her under his wing and she joined the Scottish dance band the Occasionals, in 1992. She was a member of the Ceilidh Collective and Bella McNab's dance bands.

Campbell initially gained prominence as one half of the folk band The Cast, alongside her husband David Francis, with whom she has had a long collaboration. Their debut album The Winnowing was released in 1994. The album includes their version of Auld Lang Syne which was featured on the soundtrack of the 2008 movie Sex and the City. The song can be heard during the New Year's scene of the film, accompanying a montage of the main characters' activities that night. The Cast recorded another two albums: Colours of Lichen in 1996 and Green Gold in 2007.

In 1999, Campbell and Francis were invited to perform their version of Auld Lang Syne for Sean Connery at the Presidential Awards in Washington, D.C., with President Bill Clinton in the audience.

In 2011 and 2013 Campbell, Francis and the director Kath Burlinson made two shows of story and songs that marked the lives of Campbell's forebears. Red Earth is the story of her grandmother's life as the wife of Campbell's grandfather, a young doctor who died in China in 1938 during the Sino-Japanese War. Revival! marks the life of her paternal grandfather the Rev Duncan Campbell and his involvement with the Lewis Revivals in the 1950s. Campbell and Francis toured the folk clubs and village halls of Scotland with both shows. They incorporated moving narrative with fiddle and viola tunes and original and traditional songs. They released the album Revival & The Red Earth in 2012.

In 2011, Campbell released her first self-titled solo album. Mairi Campbell features the songs Portobello Sands which tells of a mother keenly awaiting the return of her child. Home (is not what I left behind) is about her grandmother's return to Scotland from China in 1940. She stitched upon my heart is written for her own mother who was a fine artist and quiltmaker.

In 2014, Campbell released her solo EP, Seven Songs. This is a showcase of Campbell and Francis's songwriting. If I should meet my Maker is influenced by the life of her grandfather Duncan Campbell. Jock Tamson's Bairns is in the Scot's dialect and speaks of the darker side of Edinburgh.

Campbell has collaborated with other musicians throughout her life. She has been a member of the ceilidh band The Occasionals since 1992. Since 2011 she has played and recorded with the baroque ensemble Concerto Caledonia and guested with Mr McFall's Chamber. She featured as a session musician for the Scottish quartet GiveWay.

In 2012, and again in 2014, Campbell was invited to support Joan Armatrading in concert after winning a slot in her National songwriters’ competition.

In 2014, Campbell and her husband David Francis joined a group of artists including William McIlvanny, David Greig, Ricky Ross and Karine Polwart for the Bus Party, a bus tour of Scotland to embark on conversations about Scottish independence.

== From 2015: Pulse, Auld Lang Syne and Living Stone shows ==
In 2015 Campbell created her first solo theatre show Mairi Campbell: Pulse, a one-woman show that charts Campbell's journey to seeking pulse, using voice, movement, word and animation.

Pulse is co-devised and directed by Kath Burlinson, who worked on the 2012 Fringe show Wolf and is founder and director of the Authentic Artist Collective.

Pulse was showcased in Edinburgh in June 2015 and at Celtic Connections in January 2016. In August 2016, the show then ran for a month at the Edinburgh Festival Fringe.

So, in the here and now, on a stage bare but for a rough-hewn pendulum – its flat stone culled from her family's croft – Campbell opens her throat in a spirit of belonging that is ancient and modern, and life affirming for all of us

— Mary Brennan, the Herald

A mesmerising performer with such a gift for accents and physical comedy that it's easy to forget her main job is folk musician

— Andrew Eaton-Lewis, the Scotsman

In 2017, Pulse had a second run at the Fringe and Campbell took the show on tour around Scotland.

Campbell's 2015 album Pulse is a collaboration with the producer David Gray and features in the show Pulse. The Musician, The Journal of the Musicians' Union, said of Pulse: "A beguiling brew of folk and trip-hop. Campbell's unearthly vocals are potent reminders of the rhythmic thrills of both traditional and modern dance music."

Campbell and co-creator Burlinson have created a total of three solo multi-disciplinary theatre shows, Mairi Campbell: Living Stone (which premieres at Edinburgh Festival Fringe in August 2024), Auld Lang Syne (2018) and Pulse (2015), as part of a trilogy.

Inspired by a 400-million-year-old quern stone discovered on Campbell’s great-grandmother’s croft on Lismore, Mairi Campbell: Living Stone explores themes of healing and self-discovery. The ancient stone is on stage with Campbell during the show, and its role in her journey of healing and self-discovery is woven throughout. Tracks from the new show will be available on the upcoming Living Stone album. This music plays a role in conveying the themes and stories that form the backbone of the show.

Campbell has collaborated with Barrowland Ballet on Wolves (2018) and has composed for three large scale musical theatre productions for British Youth Music Theatre.

== Teaching and retreats ==
Campbell has had a continuous teaching practice since 1992, with experience teaching fiddle, violin, step dancing and ceilidh dancing. She is also the only trained leader of InterPlay in the UK, a cross-form creative arts practice.

She was the musical director of the Edinburgh-based Scots folk choir Sangstream from 2003 for 12 years.

From 2007 to 2017, Campbell ran music retreats on the Isle of Lismore in the Southern Hebrides in Argyll where she has ancestral links and a cottage and studio. Programmes included fiddle music, singing, dancing, photography, poetry and craft.

In 2020 Campbell hosted weekly online 'celidh's' or gatherings via Zoom. As of 2023-24, Campbell runs fiddle retreats on Lismore.

== Awards ==
2007 Scots Trad Music Awards: Scots Singer of the Year

2007 Burnsong: winner

2008 Live Ireland Music Award: Best Female Musician of the Year

2008 Live Ireland Music Award: Best Composition of the Year

2011 Scots Trad Music Awards: Tutor of the Year

2011 Neil Gow International Composition Award: overall winner

2015 Scots Trad Music Awards: Instrumentalist of the Year 2015

2016 Scots Trad Music Awards: Event of the Year 2016 (Pulse) (nominee)

2018 Na trads awards - inspiration award

2019 Scottish Traditional Music Hall of Fame

== Discography ==
=== Solo work ===
==== Albums/EPs ====
Meet Me at the Threshold EP (2023)

Mairi Campbell (2011)

Seven Songs (2014)

=== Collaborations ===
==== David Gray and Mairi Campbell ====
Living Stone (2024)

Storm (2020)

Auld Lang Syne (2018)

Pulse (2015)

==== The Cast ====
The Winnowing (1994)

Colours of Lichen (1996)

Greengold (2007)

Revival & The Red Earth (2012)

=== Singles ===
Auld Lang Syne – the single (1994)

=== Sheet music ===
Sheet music for songs from The Cast's album Greengold is available from Mairi Campbell's website

== See also ==
- Auld Lang Syne
