= Home (Wallis Bird album) =

Studio album by Wallis Bird
- Released: 30 September 2016
- Recorded: 2014–16
- Label: Mount Silver; Caroline International; Kaiserlich Koeniglich; Universal Music

Wallis Bird chronology
Architect (2012)	Home (2016)

Singles from Architect
- 1. "Change" Released: July 2016; 2. "Control" Released: 23 September 2016

Home is the fifth studio album by Irish singer-songwriter Wallis Bird. The album was released on 30 September 2016. The first two promo singles from the album are "Change" and "Control", with both tracks made available upon iTunes pre-order.

The album is nominated for Best Irish Album of 2016 for the Choice Music Prize.

== Background ==
The album was originally slated for an early 2017 release, however by June 2016 Wallis decided to change her position on the album release and decided on an autumn 2016 release with an expanded European tour for early 2017. Recording for the album took place between Ireland and Germany. The subject matter covers life, love, sexuality, long-term relationships and the longing for home in Ireland and forming a new home in Germany.

== Singles ==
The first two promo singles are "Change" and "Control". As part of the promotion for the album release, over an 11-week period one of the tracks which feature on the album were revealed through her social media sites.

== Videos ==
On 17 June 2016, a promo video for "Home" appeared on her website and YouTube; a few days later Wallis confirmed a new album release. On 29 July, a music video for "Control" appeared on her website. A music video for "Control" premiered via Clash magazine on 23 September 2016.

== Formats ==
The album was released for download and on CD. It is also available on a limited edition gold coloured 180g vinyl.

== Track listing ==
1. "Change"
2. "ODOM"
3. "Control"
4. "Pass the Darkness"
5. "That Leads the Way"
6. "Home"
7. "Love"
8. "The Deep Reveal"
9. "Fantasy"
10. "I Want It, I Need It"
11. "Seasons"

== Tour ==
In Autumn 2016, Bird performed across Ireland, Germany and Switzerland as part of a promotional tour for the album. Bird performed a number of shows in Japan in December 2016. This was followed by shows in Australia in early January 2017 before returning to Ireland in late January. Bird will launch a longer Home tour encompassing Ireland, Germany, Austria, the UK in early 2017.

== Charts ==
Chart (2016)	Peak position
Austrian Albums (Ö3 Austria)	31
