= Architect (album) =

ARCHITECT

Studio album by Wallis Bird
- Released: 11 April 2014 (Ireland, Germany, Austria and Switzerland); 14 April 2014 (UK)
- Recorded: 2012–14
- Label: Kaiserlich Koeniglich

Wallis Bird chronology
Wallis Bird (2012)	ARCHITECT (2014)	Home (2016)

Singles from Architect
- 1. "Hardly Hardly" Released: 4 April 2013

Architect is the fourth studio album by Irish singer-songwriter Wallis Bird. The album was released in Ireland on 11 April 2014 alongside Germany, Austria and Switzerland. The album was released in the United Kingdom on 14 April 2014. The first promotional single from the album is "Hardly Hardly", and those who pre-ordered the album on iTunes prior to its Irish release received "I Can Be Your Man" for free.

== Singles ==
The first commercial single from the album is "Hardly Hardly", released across Europe on 28 March 2014 and on iTunes on 4 April 2014. The single received its first play on Irish radio on 11 February 2014. The single comes in two formats; an album version and a radio version. The Hardly Hardly EP was released on 4 April 2014 featuring remixes by Vinnie and Rebscher, LaRochelleBand and Sebastien Leger.

== Formats ==
There were a number of versions of the album upon release. The original version of the album features 10 tracks. The box set version of the album features two CDs with a total of 20 tracks, along with stickers and playing cards and a third version was made available on iTunes featuring the two albums as one download.

== Track listing ==
1. "Hardly Hardly"
2. "I Can Be Your Man"
3. "Daze"
4. "Holding a Light"
5. "The Cards"
6. "Girls"
7. "Communion"
8. "Gloria"
9. "Hammering"
10. "River of Paper"

Box set and download version disc 2

1. "Little Plastic Castle" (song by Ani DiFranco)
2. "Peaches" (song by The Stranglers)
3. "Black and Gold" (song by Sam Sparro)
4. "Becoming a Jackal" (song by Villagers)
5. "Pearl's a Singer" (song by Elkie Brooks)
6. "Jóga" (song by Björk)
7. "Teardrop" (song by Massive Attack)
8. "Hit Me with Your Rhythm Stick" (song by Ian Dury)
9. "In My Life" (song by The Beatles)
10. "Caledonia" (song by Dolores Keane)

== Tour ==
A European tour commenced on 25 April 2014 beginning in Dublin before moving onto other European cities such as Cork, Galway, Vienna, Berlin, London, Zurich, Milan and Haarlem.

== Charts ==
Chart (2014)	Position
Irish Albums (IRMA)	24
