= Caledonia (Alan Roberts and Dougie MacLean album) =

Studio album by Alan Roberts and Dougie MacLean
- Released: 1978
- Recorded: 1977
- Studio: Fairview Studios, Willerby, East Riding of Yorkshire
- Genre: Folk
- Label: Plant Life
- Producer: Nigel Pegrum

Singles from Caledonia
- 1. "Caledonia" Released: 1978

Caledonia is a 1978 album by Alan Roberts and Dougie MacLean. It contains the title song "Caledonia" and it was recorded at Fairview Recording Studio and printed by Garrod & Lofthouse.

== Track listing ==
All tracks are Traditional; except where noted.
Side A

1. "Plooboy Laddies" (4:00)
2. "Johnny Teasie Weasle" (3:00)
3. "Over My Mountain" (Dougie MacLean) (3:20)
4. "The Rowan Tree" (3:20)
5. "Mistress MacKinley's Breakfast Surreals" (3:25)

Side B

1. "Caledonia" (Dougie MacLean) (3:50)
2. "Mormond Braes" (2:30)
3. "Til Tomorrow" (Dougie MacLean) (4:36)
4. "Jennifer's Tunes" (3:10)
5. "Sleepy Toon" (4:06)

== Personnel ==
- Alan Roberts – guitar
- Dougie McLean – guitar, vocals
- Nigel Pegrum – percussion
- Jon Gillaspie – synthesizer

Technical

- Keith Herd, Roy Neve - engineer
- George Peckham - mastering
