= This Is the Life (Amy Macdonald album) =

Studio album by Amy Macdonald
- Released: 30 July 2007
- Recorded: 2006–2007
- Studio: Brookland Road Studio; Soho Recording Studios (London)
- Genre: Alternative rock; indie rock; indie folk
- Length: 44:15
- Label: Melodramatic; Vertigo
- Producer: Pete Wilkinson

Amy Macdonald chronology
This Is the Life (2007)	Live from Glasgow (2007)

Amy Macdonald studio album chronology
This Is the Life (2007)	A Curious Thing (2010)

Singles from This Is the Life
- 1. "Poison Prince" Released: 7 May 2007; 2. "Mr Rock & Roll" Released: 16 July 2007; 3. "L.A." Released: 15 October 2007; 4. "This Is the Life" Released: 10 December 2007; 5. "Run" Released: 3 March 2008; 6. "Poison Prince" Released: 19 May 2008 (re-release)

Professional ratings
Review scores
Source	Rating
AllMusic	3.5/5 stars
BBC	(favourable)
Blender	4/5 stars
Insiders' Guides	8/10
Los Angeles Times	2.5/4 stars
The Guardian	3/5 stars
The Independent	4/5 stars
TimesOnline	3/5 stars
Yahoo! Music	8/10 stars

This Is the Life is the debut studio album by Scottish singer-songwriter Amy Macdonald, released on 30 July 2007 via Melodramatic and Vertigo Records. Produced by Pete Wilkinson, it spawned a total of six singles to accompany its release – "Poison Prince", "Mr Rock & Roll", "L.A.", "This Is the Life", "Run" and a re–release of "Poison Prince" in 2008. The later four singles achieved considerable commercial success across continental Europe. "Mr Rock & Roll" and "This Is the Life" were particularly successful, with the latter reaching number one in Norway, the Netherlands, Belgium and Austria.

This is the Life reached number one in the United Kingdom and in her native Scotland on 13 January 2008. It sold over 900,000 copies in the UK as of February 2017, awarding the album a certification of 3× Platinum. In the United States, it became her first, and only, studio album to date to debut within the Billboard 200; it peaked at number 92 in the chart.

== Background and recording ==
Macdonald sent a demo CD in response to an advertisement placed in the NME by a new production company set up by songwriters Pete Wilkinson and Sarah Erasmus. Wilkinson said he was "literally aghast" at her songwriting abilities when first he heard Macdonald play the songs "This Is the Life" and "Mr Rock n Roll". He then spent around eight or nine months recording demos with Macdonald at his home studio with a view to securing a record deal for his new client. In 2007 she signed a contract with Vertigo when she was 18 years old.

She has claimed that she feels she was "in the right place at the right time" by answering the advertisement in NME, later claiming that the subsequent success she endured to be "a weird life". Macdonald has been described as "one of the last artists" to gain a recording contract by sending a demo to record companies, with Macdonald claiming it to be "mental", citing the music industry changes since 2007. Macdonald claims that "what’s funny is even then, everyone found it bizarre that I got a record deal from sending a demo, because this was when people were being discovered on MySpace — Lily Allen, Arctic Monkeys; they were all doing it that way".

== Singles and other tracks ==
The first single from the album was "Poison Prince", a limited online release, while the debut first full single was the successful "Mr Rock & Roll", which debuted at number 12. The following singles "L.A." and "This Is the Life" were considerably less successful in the UK, although "This Is the Life" is considered her most successful song in the rest of Europe, where it peaked at number 1 in Belgium and the Netherlands, number 2 in Switzerland, number 3 in Spain, number 6 in Norway and number 8 in Denmark. It peaked at number 28 in the UK, spending 17 weeks in the top 75. After fifth single "Run", the sixth release from the album was a re-release of "Poison Prince" on 19 May 2008.

Three songs of the album are cover versions: "Caledonia", originally recorded in 1979 by Dougie MacLean, "Fairytale of New York", first performed in 1987 by The Pogues and Kirsty MacColl, written by Jem Finer and Shane MacGowan, and "Mr. Brightside", cover version of a 2004 song by The Killers, written by Brandon Flowers and Dave Keuning.

United Kingdom

- "Poison Prince" (7 May 2007)
- "Mr Rock & Roll" (16 July 2007)
- "L.A." (15 October 2007)
- "This Is the Life" (10 December 2007)
- "Run" (3 March 2008)
- "Poison Prince" (19 May 2008 – re-release)

Europe

- "Mr Rock & Roll" (5 August 2008)
- "This Is the Life"
- "Run" (20 February 2009)
- "Poison Prince" (19 June 2009)

Poland

- "Poison Prince"
- "This Is the Life"
- "Mr Rock & Roll"

Canada and US

- "Mr Rock & Roll" (5 August 2008)

== Chart performance ==
The album was particularly successful in Germany, spending 57 weeks in the top 20 of the German Albums Chart, 36 weeks in the top 10 of the German albums chart and a total of 100 weeks on the entire chart; it has been certified 5× Platinum (as 2012) for over 1.000,000 copies sold in the country. It also spent 57 weeks in the Dutch albums chart and 53 weeks in the Swiss albums chart.

It has also been certified Gold in Sweden. It has been certified Platinum in France for over 220,000 copies sold. The album was released in the US on 19 August 2008.

== Track listings ==
All tracks were written by Amy Macdonald except where there are clarifications in the "Writer(s)" column.

=== Standard edition ===
No.	Title	Writer(s)	Length
1.	"Mr Rock & Roll"		3:35
2.	"This Is the Life"		3:05
3.	"Poison Prince"		3:28
4.	"Youth of Today"		4:00
5.	"Run"		3:50
6.	"Let's Start a Band"		4:05
7.	"Barrowland Ballroom"		3:58
8.	"L.A."	Amy Macdonald, Pete Wilkinson	4:06
9.	"A Wish for Something More"		3:46
10.	"Footballer's Wife"		5:06

International bonus tracks
No.	Title	Writer(s)	Length
11.	"The Road to Home"		2:20
12.	"Caledonia" (hidden track)	Dougie MacLean	2:00

French and Japanese bonus tracks
No.	Title	Writer(s)	Length
11.	"The Road to Home"		2:20
12.	"Caledonia" (hidden track)	Dougie MacLean	2:00
13.	"Mr. Brightside" (live from King Tuts)		4:14
14.	"Mr Rock & Roll" (live from King Tuts)		3:28
15.	"Rock Bottom"		3:45

=== Deluxe edition ===
After the major success of "This Is the Life" across Europe, near the end of 2008 a deluxe version of the album was released. The two-disc set include the standard version of the album and a bonus CD with several bonus tracks, live and acoustic versions.

CD 1
No.	Title	Writer(s)	Length
1.	"Mr Rock & Roll"		3:35
2.	"This Is the Life"		3:05
3.	"Poison Prince"		3:28
4.	"Youth of Today"		4:00
5.	"Run"		3:50
6.	"Let's Start a Band"		4:05
7.	"Barrowland Ballroom"		3:58
8.	"L.A."	Amy Macdonald, Pete Wilkinson	4:06
9.	"A Wish for Something More"		3:46
10.	"Footballer's Wife"		5:06

CD 2
No.	Title	Length
1.	"This Is the Life" (acoustic live version)	3:19
2.	"This Much Is True"	2:44
3.	"Somebody New"	3:29
4.	"Footballer's Wife" (live from Glasgow Barrowlands)	5:02
5.	"Fairy Tale of New York" (live from Glasgow Barrowlands, originally performed by The Pogues & Kirsty MacColl)	5:50
6.	"Mr. Brightside" (live from Glasgow Barrowlands, originally performed by The Killers)	4:05
7.	"Mr Rock & Roll" (live from Glasgow Barrowlands)	3:28
8.	"Rock Bottom"	3:46
9.	"The Road to Home"	2:21
10.	"Caledonia" (hidden track)	2:06

Digital release
No.	Title	Length
11.	"What Is Love"	3:42

== Personnel ==
- Amy Macdonald – Vocals, Acoustic Guitar
- Pete Wilkinson – Producer, Manager
- Seton Daunt – Guitar
- Jolyon Dixon – Guitar, Mixing
- Jamie Sefton – Bass
- Adam Falkner – Drums, Percussion
- Johnny Dyke – Keyboards
- Phillip Read Mason – Bagpipes
- Audrey Riley – Cello, Conductor
- Richard George – Violin
- Jonathan Hill – Violin
- Laura Melhuish – Violin
- Susan Dench – Viola
- Joe Fields – Engineer
- Paul Adam & His Mayfair Music – Executive Producer
- Guy Katsav – Assistant Engineer
- Bob Clearmountain – Mixing
- Danton Supple – Mixing On Tracks 3, 4, 5
- Valerie Phillips – Cover Design, photography

== Charts ==
=== Weekly charts ===
Chart (2007–2009)	Peak position
Austrian Albums (Ö3 Austria)	3
Belgian Albums (Ultratop Flanders)	2
Belgian Albums (Ultratop Wallonia)	5
Danish Albums (Hitlisten)	1
Dutch Albums (Album Top 100)	1
French Albums (SNEP)	6
German Albums (Offizielle Top 100)	3
Greek Albums (IFPI)	2
Icelandic Albums (Tónlistinn)	11
Irish Albums (IRMA)	16
Italian Albums (FIMI)	6
Mexican Albums (Top 100 Mexico)	1
Norwegian Albums (VG-lista)	5
Polish Albums (ZPAV)	14
Portuguese Albums (AFP)	19
Scottish Albums (Official Charts)	1
Spanish Albums (Promusicae)	2
Swedish Albums (Sverigetopplistan)	5
Swiss Albums (Schweizer Hitparade)	1
UK Albums (Official Charts)	1
US Billboard 200	92

=== Year-end charts ===
Chart (2007)	Position
UK Albums (OCC)	47
Chart (2008)	Position
Austrian Albums (Ö3 Austria)	13
Belgian Albums (Ultratop Flanders)	6
Belgian Albums (Ultratop Wallonia)	36
Dutch Albums (Album Top 100)	2
French Albums (SNEP)	24
German Albums (Offizielle Top 100)	8
Swedish Albums (Sverigetopplistan)	18
Swiss Albums (Schweizer Hitparade)	2
UK Albums (OCC)	21
Chart (2009)	Position
Dutch Albums (Album Top 100)	43
German Albums (Offizielle Top 100)	10
Swiss Albums (Schweizer Hitparade)	18

== Certifications ==
Region	Certification	Certified units/sales
Austria (IFPI Austria)	2× Platinum	40,000^{*}
Belgium (BRMA)	2× Platinum	60,000^{*}
Denmark (IFPI Danmark)	Platinum	30,000^{^}
France (SNEP)	Gold	75,000^{*}
Germany (BVMI)	5× Platinum	1,000,000^{^}
Greece (IFPI Greece)	Gold	7,500^{^}
Ireland (IRMA)	Gold	7,500^{^}
Italy (FIMI)	Gold	40,000^{*}
Netherlands (NVPI)	2× Platinum	140,000^{^}
Norway (IFPI Norway)	Gold	20,000^{*}
Poland (ZPAV)	Gold	10,000^{*}
Russia (NFPF)	Gold	10,000^{*}
Spain (Promusicae)	Gold	40,000^{^}
Sweden (GLF)	Gold	20,000^{^}
Switzerland (IFPI Switzerland)	4× Platinum	120,000^{^}
United Kingdom (BPI)	2× Platinum	600,000^{‡}
Summaries
Europe (IFPI)	2× Platinum	2,000,000^{*}
Worldwide	—	3,000,000
^{*} Sales figures based on certification alone.^{^} Shipments figures based on certification alone.^{‡} Sales+streaming figures based on certification alone.
