= Dougie MacLean =

Scottish musician (born 1954)

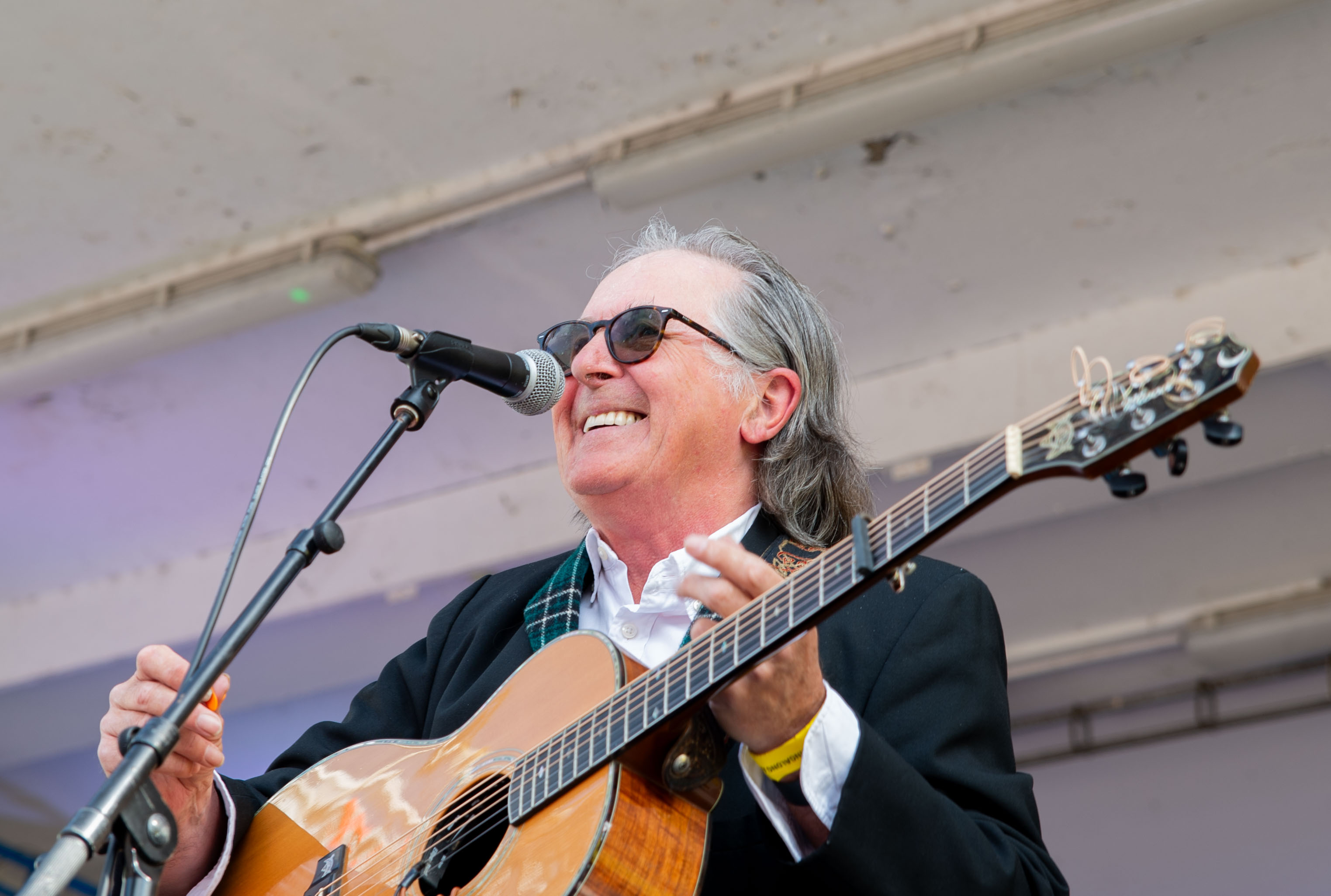
- Dougie MacLean at Edinburgh International Festival 2025

Background information
- Born: 27 September 1954 (age 71); Dunblane, Perthshire, Scotland
- Genres: Folk, World music
- Occupations: Singer, songwriter, composer, musician
- Instruments: Vocals, Guitar, Violin, Mandola, Viola, Irish bouzouki, Harmonica, Banjo, Bass
- Website: www.dougiemaclean.com

Dougie MacLean, OBE (born 27 September 1954) is a Scottish singer-songwriter, composer, multi-instrumentalist, and record producer. Described by AllMusic as "one of Scotland's premier singer-songwriters", MacLean has performed both under his own name, and as part of multiple folk bands, since the mid 1970s. His most famous pieces include "Caledonia", which is often dubbed Scotland's "unofficial national anthem"; and "The Gael", which became the main theme to the 1992 film The Last of the Mohicans.

MacLean's songs have been covered by numerous popular artists. Aside from his career as a touring singer-songwriter, MacLean founded the Dunkeld Records label and recording studio with his wife Jennifer in 1983.

== Origins and early work ==
MacLean grew up in the Perthshire countryside, where his father was a gardener. His mother played melodeon, and his father played the fiddle.

To support himself in the 1970s, MacLean was a driver for Doc Watson and Merle Watson during their tour around Europe. He maintained a friendship afterward and has appeared at Merlefest.

In 1976, MacLean began touring with Scottish folk band The Tannahill Weavers, with whom he also participated in a studio recording. In the late 1970s, he spent six months touring with Scottish band Silly Wizard. "Caledonia", from MacLean's first album with Alan Roberts (1978), is often dubbed Scotland's "unofficial national anthem".

== Solo career ==
MacLean is described by AllMusic as "one of Scotland's premier singer-songwriters". His solo career started in 1981 and since then he has recorded numerous albums. He plays multiple instruments, including guitar, violin, mandola, viola, bouzouki, banjo, and bass. He was also a singer and composer.

MacLean composed "The Gael" (1990), which became the main theme to the 1992 film The Last of the Mohicans. He also served as music director for TAG Theatre Company's 1993 production of A Scots Quair, releasing his contributions on the Sunset Song LP (1994). MacLean's songs have been recorded by many artists including Dolores Keane, Rich Mullins, Ronan Keating, Paolo Nutini, Amy Macdonald, Kathy Mattea, Frankie Miller, Cara Dillon, and Mary Black, who covered "Turning Away" (1991) for the soundtrack of the 2001 film Angel Eyes.

MacLean was the subject of the 1993 BBC documentary film The Land: The Songs of Dougie MacLean. He has organised and performed in the Perthshire Amber festival, Birnam & Dunkeld, alongside multiple performances at Celtic Connections, Glasgow.

MacLean founded the Dunkeld Records label and recording studio with his wife Jennifer in 1983.

== Other pursuits ==
MacLean owned the Taybank Hotel in Dunkeld around 2015.

== Awards ==
In 2011, MacLean was invested as an Officer of the Most Excellent Order of the British Empire (OBE).

In 2013, MacLean was awarded the BBC Radio 2 Folk Award for Lifetime Achievement for Contribution to Songwriting. The award was presented by First Minister Alex Salmond at Glasgow Royal Concert Hall.

== Discography ==
=== Studio ===
- Are Ye Sleeping Maggie (1976) (with The Tannahill Weavers)
- Caledonia (1978) (as Alan Roberts & Dougie MacLean)
- CRM (1979) (as Alex Campbell, Alan Roberts & Dougie MacLean)
- Snaigow (1980)
- On A Wing and a Prayer (1981)
- Craigie Dhu (1983)
- Butterstone (1983)
- Fiddle (instrumental) (1984)
- Singing Land (1985)
- Real Estate (1988)
- Whitewash (1990)
- The Search (instrumental) (1990)
- Indigenous (1991)
- Sunset Song (instrumental) (1993)
- Marching Mystery (1994)
- The Plant Life Years (1995)
- Tribute (to Robert Burns, Niel Gow and Robert Tannahill) (1995)
- Riof (1997)
- Perthshire Amber (2000)
- Who Am I (2001)
- Early (2003)
- With Strings (2003)
- Inside The Thunder (2005)
- Muir of Gormack (EP) (2007)
- Resolution (2010)
- Till Tomorrow (2014) (with Royal Scottish National Orchestra)
- Caledonia Cantata (2015)
- New Tomorrow (2017)
- A Robert Burns Selection (2018)
- Flo (2022)
- GNA (2024)

=== Live ===
- Live From The Ends Of The Earth (2000)

=== Video ===
- The Land (1996)
- Live At Perthshire Amber (2006)
- Songmaker (2010)

=== Compilations ===
- The Dougie Maclean Collection (1995)
- The Plant Life Years (1995)
- The Essential Dougie MacLean (2007)
- Essential Too (2013)

=== Collaborations ===
- On The Blooming Queensland Side (1995) (with Robbie Brock)
