= Wallis Bird =

Irish singer songwriter and musical artist

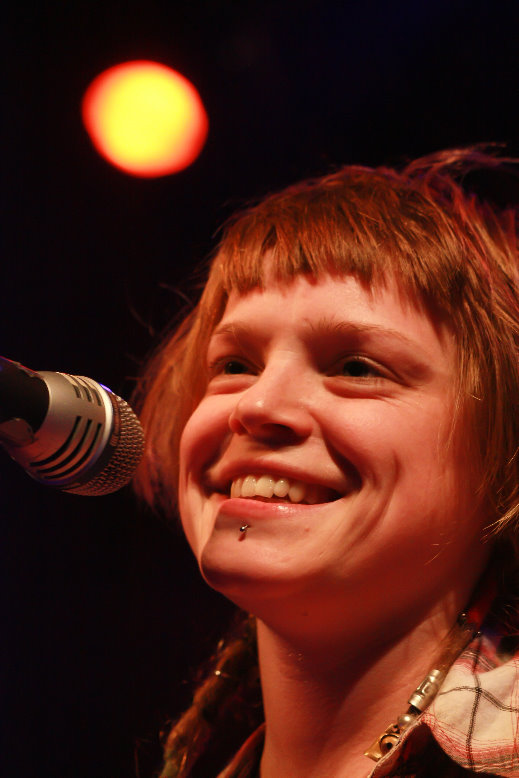

Background information
- Born: 29 January 1982 (age 44); Enniscorthy, County Wexford, Ireland
- Genres: Folk, rockabilly, acoustic
- Occupations: Singer, songwriter
- Instruments: Vocals, guitar
- Years active: 2005–present
- Label: Bird Records/Kaiserlich Koeniglich Records
- Website: www.wallisbird.com

Wallis Bird (born 29 January 1982) is an Irish musician, living in Berlin since 2012. As of February 2023, she has released six studio albums, including Architect in 2014 and Home in 2016.

== Career ==
Bird performed at the Eurosonic Festival in 2012 when Ireland was the Spotlight Country.

Bird released her third studio album in March 2012 in Ireland, Germany, Austria and Switzerland. The album was recorded in Berlin, Germany. The first single, "Encore", was released on 2 March. The music video debuted on 1 February, and had been shot in Berlin.

A live album featuring recordings from her European tours from her debut album to her 2014 release Architect, Yeah! was released in 2015.

Home is her fifth studio album, released worldwide in September 2016.

== Discography ==
=== Studio albums ===
Year	Album details	Peak chart positions			Certifications
Year	Album details	IRL	AUT	GER	Certifications
2007	Spoons: Released: October 2007; Label: Island; Formats: CD, digital download	—	—	—	
2009	New Boots: Released: 24 July 2009; Label: Columbia (Europe outside Ireland); Formats: CD, digital download	14	59	—	
2012	Wallis Bird: Released: 9 March 2012; Label: Rubyworks (Ireland and UK); Formats: CD, digital download	11	51	99	
2014	Architect: Released: 11 April 2014; Label: Kaiserlich Koeniglich / Bird; Formats: CD, digital download	24	67	93	
2016	Home: Released: 30 September 2016; Label: Mount Silver; Formats: CD, digital download	—	31	—	
2019	Woman: Released: 27 September 2019; Label: AntiFragile Music / Mount Silver; Formats: CD, digital download				
2022	Hands: Released: 27 May 2022; Label: Mount Silver; Formats: CD, digital download				
2026	I Can See Your House From Here: Released: 5 June 2026; Label: bród records; Formats: CD, Vinyl			—	
"—" denotes a title that did not chart, or was not released in that territory.

=== Live albums ===
- Yeah! (2015)

=== EPs ===
- Branches Untangle (six-track EP, Bird Records, 2006)
- Moodsets EP (2006)

=== Singles ===
Year	Single	Peak chart positions			Album
Year	Single	IRL	UK	UK Indie	Album
2007	"Blossoms in the Street"	—	—	—	Spoons
2008	"Counting to Sleep"	—	—	—	Spoons
2008	Just Can't Get Enough	—	—	—	Non-album single
2009	"La La Land"	—	—	—	New Boots
2009	"To My Bones"	—	—	—	New Boots
"—" denotes a title that did not chart, or was not released in that territory.

- "Blossoms in the Street", 15 October 2007
- "Counting to Sleep", 10 March 2008 (Irish language version: "Comhaireamh chun Codladh")
- Just Can't Get Enough, 22 October 2008
- "To My Bones", 2009

=== Download-only releases ===
- The Circle EP (Germany only)

== Awards ==
- Meteor Music Award (Category: "Hope for 2009"), 2009
- Meteor Music Award (Category: "Best Irish Female"), 2010

== In popular culture ==
In March 2010, Bird appeared on GOTV to present her favorite music videos and musical influences.
