= This Is the Life (Amy Macdonald song) =

2007 single by Amy Macdonald

Single by Amy Macdonald

from the album This Is the Life
- Released: 10 December 2007
- Studio: Brookland Road, Soho (London)
- Length: 3:05
- Label: Vertigo; Melodramatic
- Songwriter: Amy Macdonald
- Producer: Pete Wilkinson

Amy Macdonald singles chronology
"L.A." (2007)	"This Is the Life" (2007)	"Run" (2008)

Music video
- "This Is the Life" on YouTube

"This Is the Life" is a song by Scottish singer-songwriter Amy Macdonald from her 2007 debut album of the same name. It was released on 10 December 2007 in the United Kingdom and in 2008 in most European countries. It became a hit in mainland Europe, topping the charts of five countries and reaching the top 10 on 12 other European music listings. Conversely, the song did not match the success of "Mr Rock & Roll" in the United Kingdom, stalling at number 28 on the UK Singles Chart. The music video consists of pictures of Macdonald and her friends' night out.

== Background ==
Macdonald explained in a video posted on March 30, 2023, on her official TikTok account that she wrote the song when she was 16 years old. She shared that one night she went out using her sister's ID and had an amazing time. However, the next day, she was caught and grounded, spending the entire day in her room. It was during that confinement day that, inspired by the unforgettable night before, she wrote the song.

== Composition ==
"This is the Life" is three minutes and five seconds long, and is written in the key of C-sharp minor. It is set in common time and has a tempo of 100 beats per minute. MacDonald's vocal range is from G♯_{3} to A_{4}. In an interview with Expressen, MacDonald said that the song took about 10 minutes to write.

== Commercial performance ==
The song was first released in December 2007 in the United Kingdom but achieved only moderate success, peaking at number 28 on the UK Singles Chart and number 18 on the Scottish Singles Chart. Throughout 2008, it was released throughout most of Europe, reaching number one in Austria, Belgium, the Czech Republic, and the Netherlands. In Flanders and the Netherlands, "This Is the Life" was the highest-selling song of 2008. The single reached the top three in France, Germany, Hungary, Italy, Spain, Sweden, and Switzerland. In Spain, the song was certified double platinum, denoting sales of over 80,000 units, in 2009. In Norway, the song reached number 10 during its initial release, but in January 2011, it re-entered the chart at number one. "This Is the Life" was Macdonald's only song to chart in North America, peaking at number 19 on the US Billboard Adult Alternative Songs chart.

== Track listings ==
UK and European CD single

1. "This Is the Life"
2. "This Much Is True"

French CD single

1. "This Is the Life"

== Charts ==
=== Weekly charts ===
Weekly chart performance
Chart (2007–2009)	Peak position
Austria (Ö3 Austria Top 40)	1
Belgium (Ultratop 50 Flanders)	1
Belgium (Ultratop 50 Wallonia)	1
Czech Republic Airplay (ČNS IFPI)	1
Denmark (Tracklisten)	8
Europe (European Hot 100 Singles)	2
France (SNEP)	2
Germany (GfK)	2
Greece (IFPI)	4
Hungary (Rádiós Top 40)	2
Iceland (Tónlistinn)	1
Italy (FIMI)	2
Netherlands (Dutch Top 40)	1
Netherlands (Single Top 100)	1
Norway (VG-lista)	6
Scottish Singles Sales (Official Charts)	17
Spain (Promusicae)	3
Sweden (Sverigetopplistan)	3
Switzerland (Schweizer Hitparade)	2
UK Singles (Official Charts)	28
US Adult Alternative Airplay (Billboard)	19

Chart (2011)	Peak position
Norway (VG-lista)	1

Chart (2013)	Peak position
Slovenia (SloTop50)	39

Chart (2017)	Peak position
Poland Airplay (ZPAV)	40

Chart (2020–2025)	Peak position
Finland Airplay (Radiosoittolista)	53
MENA (IFPI)	6
Poland (Polish Streaming Top 100)	92
Saudi Arabia (IFPI)	2

=== Year-end charts ===
Annual chart rankings
Chart (2008)	Position
Austria (Ö3 Austria Top 40)	8
Belgium (Ultratop 50 Flanders)	1
Belgium (Ultratop 50 Wallonia)	3
Europe (European Hot 100 Singles)	9
France (SNEP)	29
French Airplay (SNEP)	16
France Digital Singles (SNEP)	4
Germany (Media Control GfK)	8
Netherlands (Dutch Top 40)	1
Netherlands (Single Top 100)	1
Sweden (Sverigetopplistan)	19
Switzerland (Schweizer Hitparade)	5
UK Singles (OCC)	166

Chart (2009)	Position
Austria (Ö3 Austria Top 40)	48
Belgium (Ultratop 50 Flanders)	89
Belgium (Ultratop 50 Wallonia)	74
Europe (European Hot 100 Singles)	14
Germany (Media Control GfK)	29
Hungary (Rádiós Top 40)	4
Italy (FIMI)	4
Spain (Promusicae)	6
Switzerland (Schweizer Hitparade)	24

Chart (2025)	Position
Belgium (Ultratop 50 Flanders)	193

=== Decade-end charts ===
Decade-end chart performance
Chart (2000–2009)	Position
Germany (GfK)	7
Netherlands (Single Top 100)	99

== Certifications ==
Sales and certifications
Region	Certification	Certified units/sales
Belgium (BRMA)	Platinum	
Denmark (IFPI Danmark)	Platinum	90,000^{‡}
Germany (BVMI)	5× Gold	750,000^{‡}
Italy (FIMI)	Platinum	70,000^{‡}
New Zealand (RMNZ)	Gold	15,000^{‡}
Spain (Promusicae)	2× Platinum	50,000^{*}
Spain (Promusicae)	Platinum	60,000^{‡}
Sweden (GLF)	Gold	10,000^{^}
Switzerland (IFPI Switzerland)	Gold	15,000^{^}
United Kingdom (BPI)	2× Platinum	1,200,000^{‡}
^{*} Sales figures based on certification alone.^{^} Shipments figures based on certification alone.^{‡} Sales+streaming figures based on certification alone.

== Release history ==
Release dates
Region	Date	Format(s)	Label(s)	Ref.
United Kingdom	10 December 2007	CD	Vertigo; Melodramatic	
France	20 October 2008	CD	Mercury; Melodramatic	

== See also ==
- List of number-one hits of 2008 (Austria)
- List of number-one songs of the 2000s (Czech Republic)
- List of Platinum singles in the United Kingdom awarded since 2000
