= Caledonia's Hardy Sons =

Studio album by Silly Wizard
- Released: 1978
- Genre: Folk
- Length: 40:58
- Label: Shanachie
- Producer: John Zollman, Silly Wizard

Silly Wizard chronology
Silly Wizard (1976)	Caledonia's Hardy Sons (1978)	So Many Partings (1979)

Professional ratings
Review scores
Source	Rating
AllMusic	3/5 stars
MusicHound Folk: The Essential Album Guide	3/5 stars

Caledonia's Hardy Sons is the second album by the Scottish band Silly Wizard. It was released in the U.K. on Highway Records in 1978, and in the U.S. in 1980 on the Shanachie label.

== Track listing ==
1. "Mo Chuachag Laghach (My Kindly Sweetheart)" (02:26)
2. "The Isla Waters" (03:50)
3. "The Twa Brithers" (06:15)
4. "The Auld Pipe Reel/The Brolum" (03:38)
5. "Glasgow Peggy" (03:21)
6. "Monymusk Lads" (03:32)
7. "The Ferryland Sealer" (03:24)
8. "Fhear A Bhata (The Boatman)" (04:38)
9. "Jack Cunningham's Farewell to Benbecula/Sweet Molly" (04:34)
10. "Broom O' the Cowdenknowes" (05:20)

== Personnel ==
- Phil Cunningham - Accordion, whistle, synthesizer, string synthesizer, harmonium, vocals
- Johnny Cunningham - Fiddle, viola, bouzouki, mandolin, mandola, vocals
- Martin Hadden - Bass, harmonium, vocals
- Gordon Jones - Guitar, bodhran, bouzouki, mandola, vocals (Lead vocals on "Ferryland Sealer")
- Andy M. Stewart - Vocals, tenor banjo, mandolin, mandola
- Bob Thomas - Guitar, mandola
