= Na Fianna (band) =

- Origin: Rathdowney, County Laois, Ireland
- Genres: Irish folk
- Years active: 2007–present
- Labels: Trad Nua
- Members: Ciarán Finn (guitar/vocals); Hugh Finn (banjo/vocals); Peter McMahon (percussion/Bodhrán/vocals); James O'Connor (accordion/vocals)
- Website: nafiannamusic.com

Na Fianna are an Irish band, with members Ciarán Finn, Hugh Finn, Peter McMahon and James O'Connor. The current members are successors to the group which were runners-up in the second season of the All Ireland Talent Show TV series in 2010. The original group was first formed in March 2007.
