= Mark Cutler =

American musician

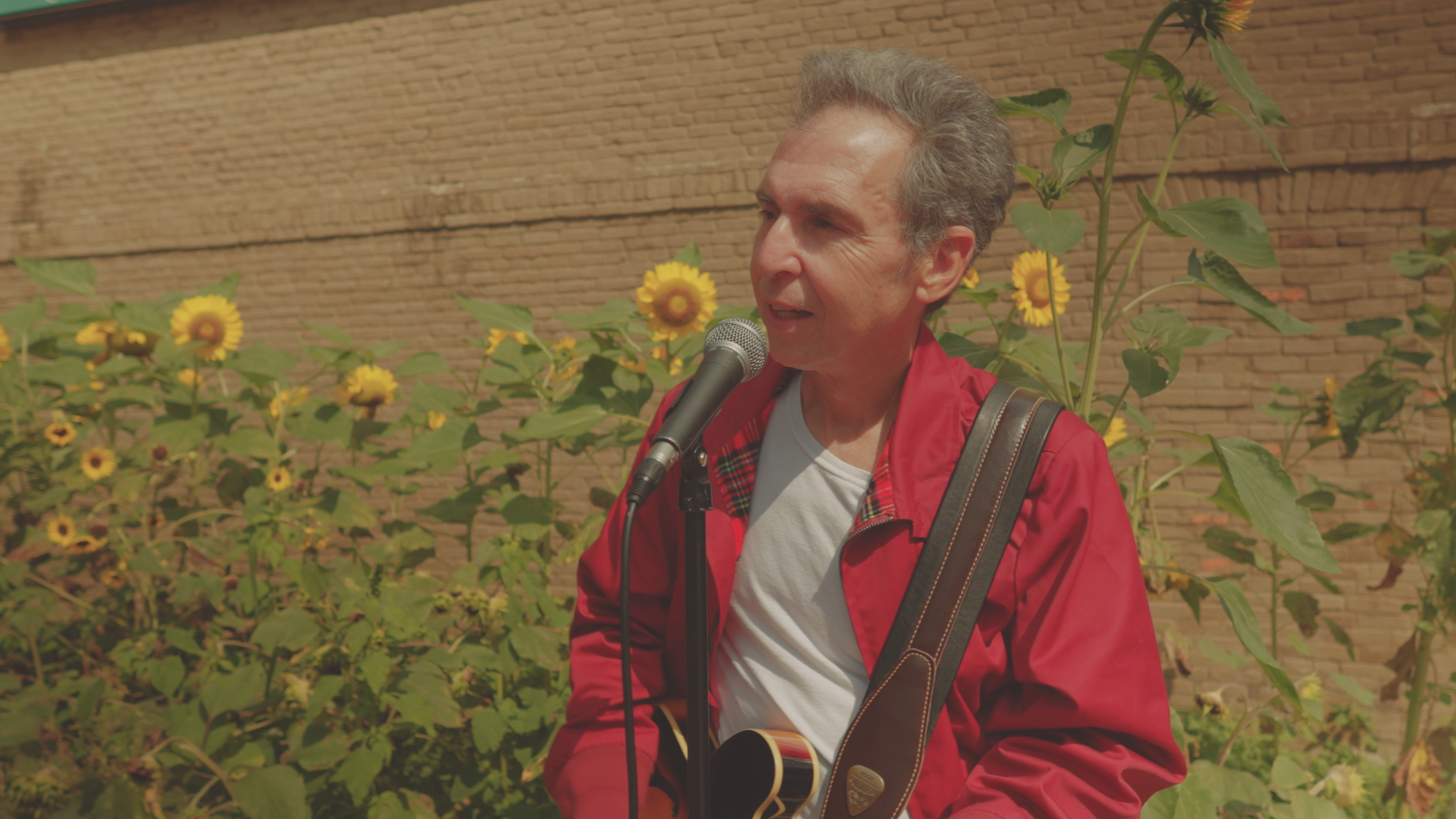
Mark Cutler performing at Roger Williams National Memorial

Mark Cutler is a recording artist and singer-songwriter from Providence, Rhode Island. Mark Cutler has been the lead singer and songwriter for The Schemers, The Raindogs, and The Dino Club. He was inducted into the Rhode Island Music Hall of Fame in 2015.
