= Silly Wizard =

Scottish folk band

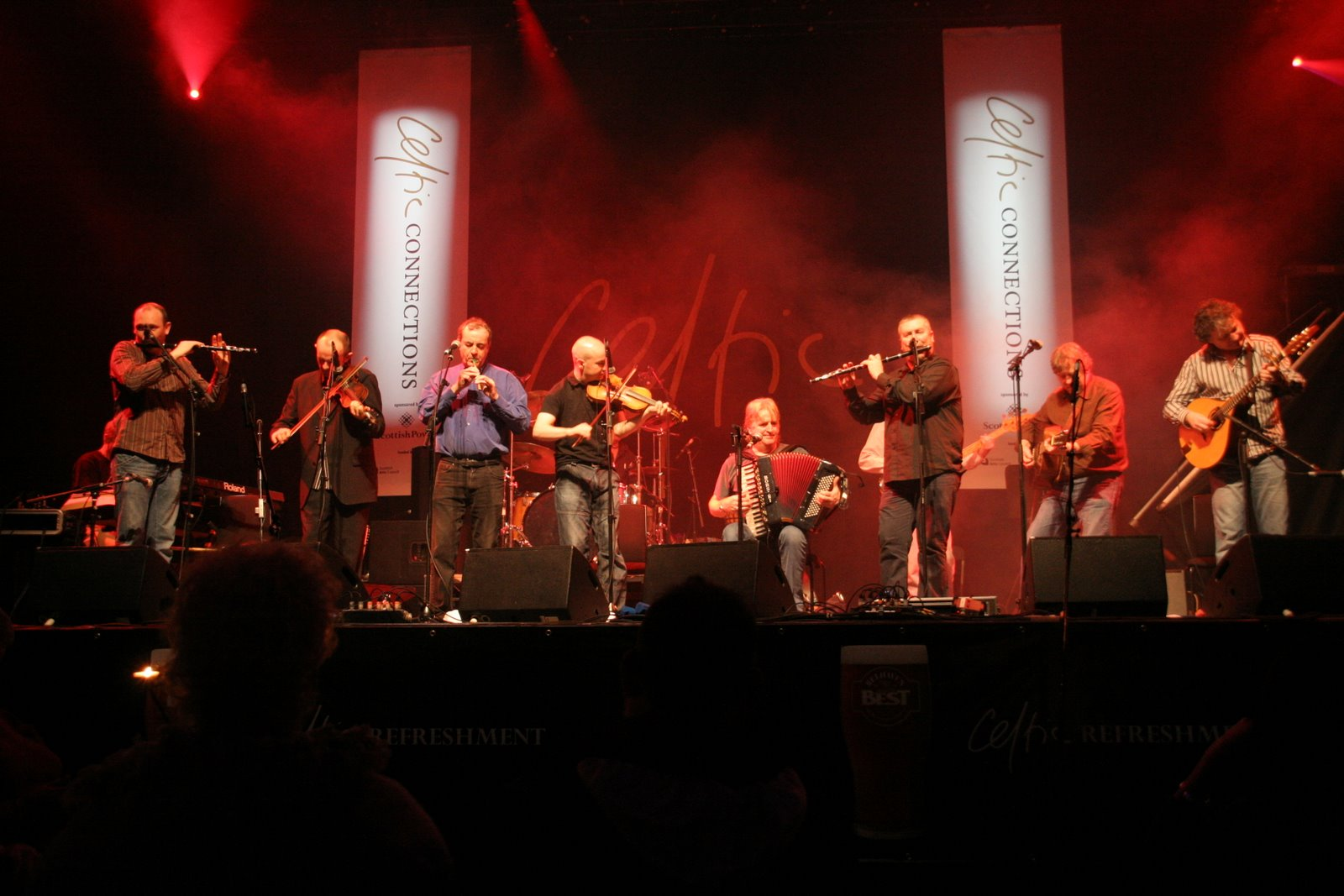
- Members of Silly Wizard perform at Celtic Connections with Phil Cunningham and Friends, February 2007

Background information
- Origin: Edinburgh, Scotland
- Genres: Celtic, traditional
- Years active: 1970–1988
- Labels: Transatlantic, Highway, Shanachie, Green Linnet
- Past members: Andy M. Stewart; Johnny Cunningham; Phil Cunningham; Martin Hadden; Bob Thomas; Gordon Jones; Bill Watkins; Chris Pritchard (folk singer); Madelaine Taylor; Neil Adam; Freeland Barbour; Alastair Donaldson; Dougie MacLean
- Website: Silly Wizard's "Official" History Pages

Silly Wizard were a Scottish folk band that began forming in Edinburgh in 1970. The founder members were two like-minded university students—Gordon Jones (guitar, bodhran, vocals, bouzouki, mandola), and Bob Thomas (guitar, mandolin, mandola, banjo, concertina). In January 1972, Jones and Thomas formed a trio with their flatmate Bill Watkins (guitar, vocals, fiddle) and performed (occasionally unpaid) under various band names in Edinburgh folk clubs. In the spring of 1972, Watkins returned to Birmingham and, in June 1972, Chris Pritchard (vocals) came in as his replacement. In July 1972, this newly formed trio were offered their first paid booking at the Burns Monument Hotel, Brig O' Doon, Scotland, and needed a band name in a hurry. The name "Silly Wizard" was chosen and the continuing stream of bookings ensured that the name became permanent. In September 1972, the trio recruited Johnny Cunningham (1957–2003) (fiddle, viola, mandola, vocals) and Silly Wizard started to take off.

== History ==
=== Formation ===
Thomas credited the name of the band to a flatmate who was writing a book of children's stories, and the group first performed as "Silly Wizard" in summer 1972. Chris Pritchard (vocals) replaced Bill Watkins (vocals, guitar) in 1972. From September 1972 until March 1974, the band organized the Saturday night bookings, and regularly performed, at the Triangle Folk Club in Edinburgh. In February 1973, vocalist Pritchard left the band and was replaced by Madelaine Taylor (guitar, bodhran, vocals). In October 1973, the band was signed to the Transatlantic Records XTRA label. An album was recorded but before it could be released, Madelaine Taylor left the band in December 1973. The master tapes were subsequently lost and the album has never been released.

Jones, Thomas, and Cunningham began touring as a trio in January 1974, and went on the first of many French tours in April 1974.

The band added Neil Adam (bass, harmonium) in September 1974 and Andy M. Stewart (vocals, tin whistle, tenor banjo) in December 1974. In March 1975, Silly Wizard began work on their next album. The band was then joined by Freeland Barbour (accordion, bouzouki) and Alastair "Ali" Donaldson (1955-2013) (bass, flute), who replaced Neil Adam in July 1975 when the latter decided to return to university. Their eponymous LP Silly Wizard was released on the XTRA label and the band began touring throughout the UK and Europe.

=== Departure of Barbour; addition of Phil Cunningham ===
In late 1976, Freeland Barbour left the band and was replaced by Johnny Cunningham's younger brother, Phil Cunningham (accordion, tin whistle, harmonium, synthesizer, octave mandolin, vocals), then sixteen years old. At the same time Alastair "Ali" Donaldson left (to join The Rezillos) and was replaced by Martin Hadden (bass, guitar, piano). This six-member line up then recorded the band's second LP, Caledonia's Hardy Sons (Highway/Shanachie, 1978). Founding member Bob Thomas left just as the group began work on their third LP, So Many Partings (Highway/Shanachie, 1979).

=== Departure of Johnny Cunningham ===
Johnny Cunningham departed the band for the U.S. in 1980 and was replaced for six months by Dougie MacLean.

=== Dissolution and aftermath ===
They continued recording until the late 1980s, when the band decided to dissolve after performing for seventeen years and releasing nine albums. The band played its final performance in Voorheesville, New York in April 1988. Johnny Cunningham died on 15 December 2003 in New York.

Andy M. Stewart died in hospital in Melrose, Roxburghshire, Scotland on 27 December 2015 as a result of medical difficulties that arose after failed spinal surgery in 2012.

== Artistry ==
=== Musical style ===
Silly Wizard played a variety of Scottish folk music, both instrumental and vocal, from fast jigs and reels to slow airs. While the majority of the items they played were traditional songs or tunes, the band did write many compositions of their own. Phil Cunningham generally wrote instrumental music centered on the accordion, and Stewart wrote several songs in a style often distinctly traditional. Once Stewart's singing and the driving, impassioned instrumentals of the Cunningham brothers had established themselves at its centre, the group's overall sound changed little.

== Honours ==
- In Scots Trad Music Awards, 2003 Silly Wizard were nominated for the best folk band award.
- Members of Silly Wizard played at Celtic Connections in February 2007.
- In December 2012, Silly Wizard was inducted into the Scottish Traditional Music Hall of Fame.

== Discography ==
- 1976 Silly Wizard
- 1978 Caledonia's Hardy Sons
- 1979 So Many Partings
- 1980 "Take the High Road" (single)
- 1981 Wild and Beautiful
- 1983 Kiss the Tears Away
- 1985 Live in America
- 1985 Golden Golden
- 1985 The Best of Silly Wizard
- 1986 A Glint of Silver
- 1988 Live Wizardry - Best of Silly Wizard in Concert
- 2012 Live Again (Recorded 1983)
- 2016 The Early Years (studio album)
