= Johnny Cunningham =

- Born: 27 August 1957; Portobello, Edinburgh, Scotland
- Died: 15 December 2003 (aged 46) New York City
- Genres: Celtic; folk; rock
- Occupations: Musician; producer
- Instruments: Fiddle; viola; bouzouki; mandolin; mandola; vocals
- Years active: 1972–2003

Johnny Cunningham (27 August 1957 – 15 December 2003) was a Scottish folk musician and composer, instrumental in spreading interest in traditional Celtic music. Jon Pareles, a culture correspondent of The New York Times, called Cunningham "one of the great Celtic fiddlers of his generation."

Johnny Cunningham was born on 27 August 1957 in Portobello, Edinburgh. He was raised as a member of the Church of Jesus Christ of Latter-day Saints, but later became inactive. At the age of five, Cunningham began playing harmonica, then accordion and piano. For his eighth birthday, his grandmother gave him a used fiddle which became his favorite instrument. Later in life, he lived in New Bedford, MA.

He was a founding member of Silly Wizard, as well as a member of Relativity, The Raindogs, and Nightnoise. Throughout his career, Cunningham was a fiddler, composer, and producer. His younger brother, Phil Cunningham, also a former member of Silly Wizard, is a multi-instrumentalist best known for his piano-accordion and whistle playing. Cunningham wrote the music for and performed in the Peter and Wendy which won the 1997 Obie Award for Best Production.

Johnny Cunningham died of a heart attack on 15 December 2003 in New York City at the age of 46.

== Composer ==
In the 1990s Johnny worked with the New York-based theater company Mabou Mines on a theatrical production, Peter & Wendy. He composed music and lyrics for this musical adaptation of J.M. Barrie's play "Peter Pan," which won two OBIE Awards. The soundtrack album from this innovative production was recorded and released nationally in 1997. Productions of "Peter & Wendy" have been presented and revived numerous times.

== Discography ==
Solo

- Thoughts from Another World (1981)
- Fair Warning (1983)

With Phil Cunningham

- Against the Storm (1980)

With Silly Wizard

- Silly Wizard (1976)
- Caledonia's Hardy Sons (1978)
- So Many Partings (1979)
- Live in America (1985)
- Golden Golden (1985)
- A Glint of Silver (1986)
- Live Wizardry (1988)

With Relativity

- Relativity (1986)
- Gathering Pace (1987)

With Nightnoise

- Shadow of Time (1993)
- A Different Shore (1995)
- The White Horse Sessions (1997)

With Celtic Fiddle Festival

- Celtic Fiddle Festival (1993)
- Celtic Fiddle Festival: Encore (1998)
- Rendezvous (2001)

With Susan McKeown

- Peter & Wendy (1997), also with Seamus Egan, Karen Kandel and Jamshied Sharifi
- A Winter Talisman (2001)
- Sweet Liberty (2004)

With Thomas Moore (spiritual writer)

- The Soul of Christmas (1997), also with Seamus Egan, Kathy Mattea, Susan McKeown, Cathie Ryan and Jamshied Sharifi

With The Raindogs

- Lost Souls (1990)
- Border Drive-In Theatre (1991)

With others

- To Warm the Winter's Night, with Áine Minogue (1995)
- ‘’Love and Loss’’, with Steve Payne (1999)
- Live on 11th Street, with Casey Neill Band (2003)
