= Andy M. Stewart =

- Born: Andrew McGregor Stewart; 8 September 1952; Alyth, Perthshire, Scotland
- Died: 27 December 2015 (aged 63)
- Occupations: Singer, songwriter, instrumentalist
- Instruments: Banjo, mandolin, tin whistle
- Formerly of: Silly Wizard

Andrew McGregor Stewart (8 September 1952 – 27 December 2015) was a Scottish singer, songwriter and instrumentalist, formerly the frontman for Silly Wizard. He was born in Alyth, Perthshire. With Silly Wizard he not only sang, but also played the tenor banjo, mandolin and tin whistles.

Andy Stewart came from the Stewart family of Scottish Travellers which included Belle Stewart and Sheila Stewart. He learnt the song "If I were a Blackbird" from the former, his great-aunt.

Stewart toured with Silly Wizard until the band broke up in 1988. After this, he recorded four solo albums, as well as three with Manus Lunny. Several of Stewart's songs became well-known within the folk community, including "The Ramblin' Rover", "Golden, Golden", "The Queen of Argyll" and "The Valley of Strathmore". In addition, his renditions of classic Robert Burns songs have been well received.

Failed spinal surgery in 2012 left Stewart paralysed from the chest down. He died from a stroke on 27 December 2015, aged 63.

== Discography ==
=== Solo ===
- By the Hush (1982)
- Songs of Robert Burns (1991)
- Man in the Moon (1994)
- Donegal Rain (1997)

=== With Silly Wizard ===
- Silly Wizard (1976)
- Caledonia's Hardy Sons (1978)
- So Many Partings (1979)
- Wild and Beautiful (1981)
- Kiss the Tears Away (1983)
- Live in America (1985)
- Golden Golden (1985)
- A Glint of Silver (1987)
- Live Wizardry (1988)
- Live Again (2012)

=== With Manus Lunny ===
- Fire in the Glen (1985, also with Phil Cunningham)
- Dublin Lady (1987)
- At It Again (1990)
