= Phil Cunningham (folk musician) =

- Cunningham in Campbeltown, Scotland, 2005

Background information
- Born: Philip Martin Cunningham; 27 January 1960 (age 66)
- Origin: Edinburgh, Scotland
- Genres: Folk, Traditional Scottish, Celtic
- Occupations: Musician, Composer, Producer, Presenter
- Instruments: Accordion, Violin, Piano, Guitar, Tin whistle, Harmonium, Synthesizer, Mandolin, Irish Bouzouki, Bass guitar
- Years active: 1976–present

Philip Martin Cunningham, MBE (born 27 January 1960 in Edinburgh, Scotland) is a Scottish folk musician and composer. He is best known for playing the accordion with Silly Wizard, as well as in other bands and in duets with his brother, Johnny. When they played together, they would egg each other on to play faster and faster, and try, light-heartedly, to trip each other up.

Phil has also collaborated with numerous other great Celtic musicians; one prominent example of this is his partnership with Aly Bain. The duo have (as of 2020) released nine albums, and between 1989 and 2019 they had a yearly spot at the New Year's Hogmanay Live broadcast on BBC Scotland.

== Biography ==
Cunningham played accordion and violin from a young age. He attended school in Portobello, and was raised a member of the Church of Jesus Christ of Latter-day Saints, attending church regularly and playing organ. However, by age fifteen he had issues towards the Church and chose to leave. He now describes himself as a spiritualist.

At the age of 16, he left school and joined his older brother Johnny in the group Silly Wizard, where he sang and played accordion, tin whistle, harmonium, guitar, and synthesizer. He also wrote many of the group's songs. After the breakup of Silly Wizard, Phil and Johnny recorded two albums and toured with Irish siblings Mícheál Ó Domhnaill and Triona Ni Domhnaill as the quartet Relativity. Phil has since had a successful solo career, releasing the solo albums Airs & Graces and The Palomino Waltz and producing albums with Aly Bain, Mark Knopfler, Dolores Keane, Altan, Connie Dover and Kris Drever. He has also produced two albums for the quartet GiveWay.

In more recent years, Phil has also composed classical music and music for theatre and television, with 1997 seeing the premiere of his Highlands and Islands Suite at the Glasgow Royal Concert Hall.

In 2002, Phil was appointed MBE for services to Scottish music. He was awarded an honorary Doctor of Letters, at Glasgow Caledonian University's graduation ceremony on 27 November 2007.

== Discography ==
=== Solo albums ===
- Airs & Graces (1983)
- Palomino Waltz (1989)

=== Silly Wizard ===
- Caledonia's Hardy Sons (1978)
- So Many Partings (1980)
- Wild and Beautiful (1981)
- Kiss the Tears Away (1983)
- A Glint of Silver (1986)
- Live Wizardry (1988)

=== Relativity ===
- Relativity (1986)
- Gathering Pace (1987)

=== With Johnny Cunningham ===
- Against the Storm (1980)

=== With Aly Bain ===
- The Pearl (1995)
- The Ruby (1997)
- Another Gem (2000)
- Spring The Summer Long (2003)
- Best of Aly and Phil (2004)
- Roads Not Travelled (2006)
- Portrait (2010)
- Five and Twenty (2012)
- No Rush (2020)

=== With Connie Dover ===
- Somebody (1991)
- The Wishing Well (1994)
- If Ever I Return (1997)
- The Border of Heaven (2000)

=== With Kris Drever ===
- Mark the Hard Earth (2010)

=== With Mark Knopfler ===
- Privateering (2012)
