= Union of the Crowns =

Personal union of the kingdoms of Scotland, England, and Ireland from 1603

The Union of the Crowns (Scottish Gaelic: Aonadh nan Crùintean; Scots: Union o the Crouns) was the accession of James VI of Scotland to the thrones of England and Ireland as James I on 24 March 1603, and the consequent formation of a personal union between the Kingdoms of England, Scotland, and Ireland. It followed the death of James's cousin Elizabeth I of England, the last monarch of the Tudor dynasty.

England, Scotland, and Ireland remained separate states with separate parliaments until the Acts of Union of 1707 united England and Scotland into a unitary Kingdom of Great Britain; Ireland retained a legally separate Crown and Parliament, albeit as a practical dependency, until 1801. However, there was a republican interregnum in the 1650s, during which the Tender of Union of Oliver Cromwell created the Commonwealth of England and Scotland, which ended with the Stuart Restoration.

== Early unification ==
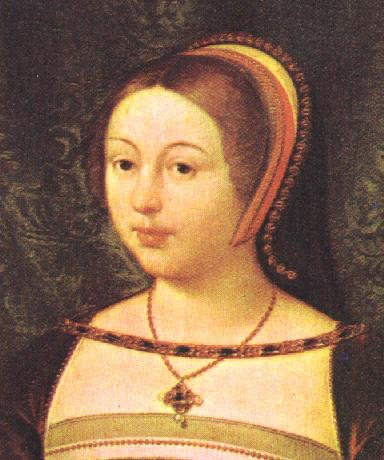
Margaret Tudor

In August 1503, James IV of Scotland married Margaret, eldest daughter of Henry VII of England, and the spirit of the new age was celebrated by the poet William Dunbar in The Thrissil and the Rois. The marriage was the outcome of the Treaty of Perpetual Peace, concluded the previous year, which, in theory, ended centuries of war and border raids between the two states. The marriage brought Scotland's Stuarts into England's Tudor line of succession, though no Scottish prince was likely to inherit the English throne. Nonetheless, many on the English side were concerned by the dynastic implications of matrimony, including some Privy Councillors. To allay these fears, Henry VII is reputed to have (correctly) predicted that an Anglo-Scottish union would be ruled from London, not Edinburgh, saying:

our realme wald receive na damage thair thorow, for in that caise Ingland wald not accress unto Scotland, bot Scotland wald acress unto Ingland, as to the most noble heid of the hole yle...evin as quhan Normandy came in the power of Inglis men our forbearis.

The peace did not last in "perpetuity"; it was disturbed in 1513 when Henry VIII of England, who had succeeded his father four years before, declared war on France in the War of the League of Cambrai. In response France invoked the terms of the Auld Alliance, her ancient bond with Scotland. James duly invaded Northern England leading to the Battle of Flodden, which England won decisively. James died at Flodden and the loss of a large proportion of the nobility led to a political crisis in Scotland.

In the decades that followed, England repeatedly invaded Scotland, including burning its capital. By the middle of Henry's reign, the problems of the royal succession, which seemed so unimportant in 1503, acquired ever larger dimensions, when the question of Tudor fertility or the lack thereof entered directly into the political arena. Margaret's line was excluded from the English succession though during the reign of Elizabeth I, concerns were once again raised. In the last decade of her reign it was clear to all that James VI of Scotland, great-grandson of James IV and Margaret, was the only generally acceptable heir.

== Accession of James VI ==
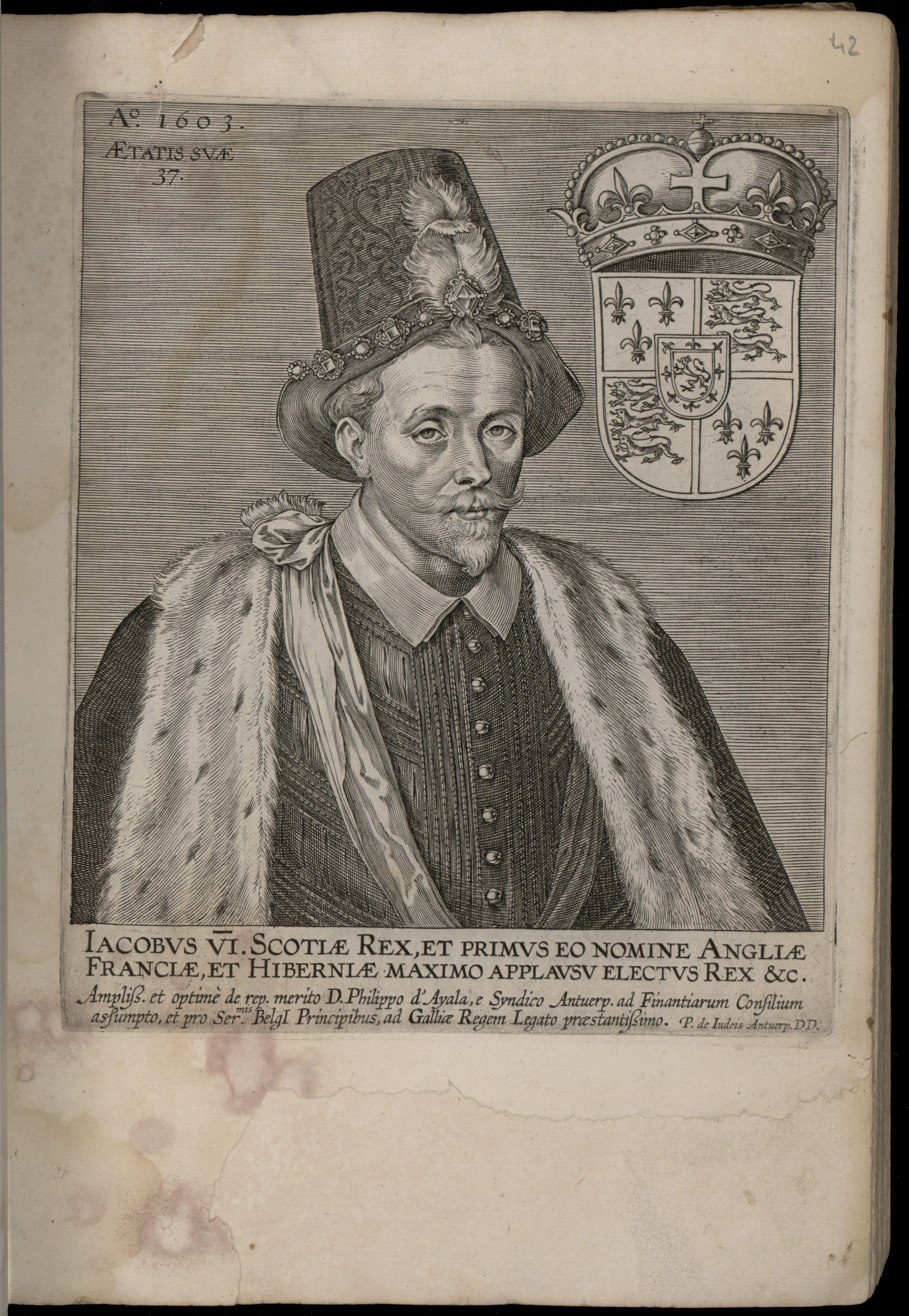
James in the year of his coronation in England, 1603

From 1601, in the last years of Elizabeth I's life, certain English politicians, notably her chief minister, Sir Robert Cecil, (Note: James described Cecil as "king there in effect".) maintained a secret correspondence with James to prepare in advance for a smooth succession. Cecil advised James not to press the matter of the succession upon the queen but simply to treat her with kindness and respect. (Note: Cecil wrote that James should "secure the heart of the highest, to whose sex and quality nothing is so improper as either needless expostulations or over much curiosity in her own actions, the first showing unquietness in yourself, the second challenging some untimely interest in hers; both which are best forborne".) The approach proved effective: "I trust that you will not doubt", Elizabeth wrote to James, "but that your last letters are so acceptably taken as my thanks cannot be lacking for the same, but yield them you in grateful sort". In March 1603, with the queen clearly dying, Cecil sent James a draft proclamation of his accession to the English throne. Strategic fortresses were put on alert, with London placed under guard. English agents including Thomas Chaloner were advising James in Edinburgh on forms of government. Elizabeth died in the early hours of 24 March. Within eight hours, James was proclaimed king in London, with the news received without protest or disturbance.

On 5 April 1603, James left Edinburgh for London and promised to return every three years, a promise that he failed to keep, returning only once, in 1617. He arrived in England at Berwick on 6 April, and planned a large public reception at York. He progressed slowly from town to town to arrive in the capital after Elizabeth's funeral. Local lords received James with lavish hospitality along the route, and James's new subjects flocked to see him and were relieved above all that the succession had triggered neither unrest nor invasion. As James entered London, he was mobbed. The crowds of people, one observer reported, were so great that "they covered the beauty of the fields; and so greedy were they to behold the King that they injured and hurt one another".

In June, James gave Tobias Matthew, Bishop of Durham, orders to travel north from London to meet Anne of Denmark, who was bringing Prince Henry and Princess Elizabeth with her. Anne crossed the border at Berwick and made her way to York. She was hailed as "Oriana" at Althorp, a name formerly used to celebrate Elizabeth I. James met Anne at Easton Neston on 28 June and travelled to Windsor Castle.

James and Anne's English coronation took place on 25 July though the festivities had to be restricted because of an outbreak of the plague. A Royal Entry featuring elaborate allegories provided by dramatic poets such as Thomas Dekker and Ben Jonson was deferred until 15 March 1604, when all London turned out for the occasion: "The streets seemed paved with men", wrote Dekker, "Stalls instead of rich wares were set out with children, open casements filled up with women".

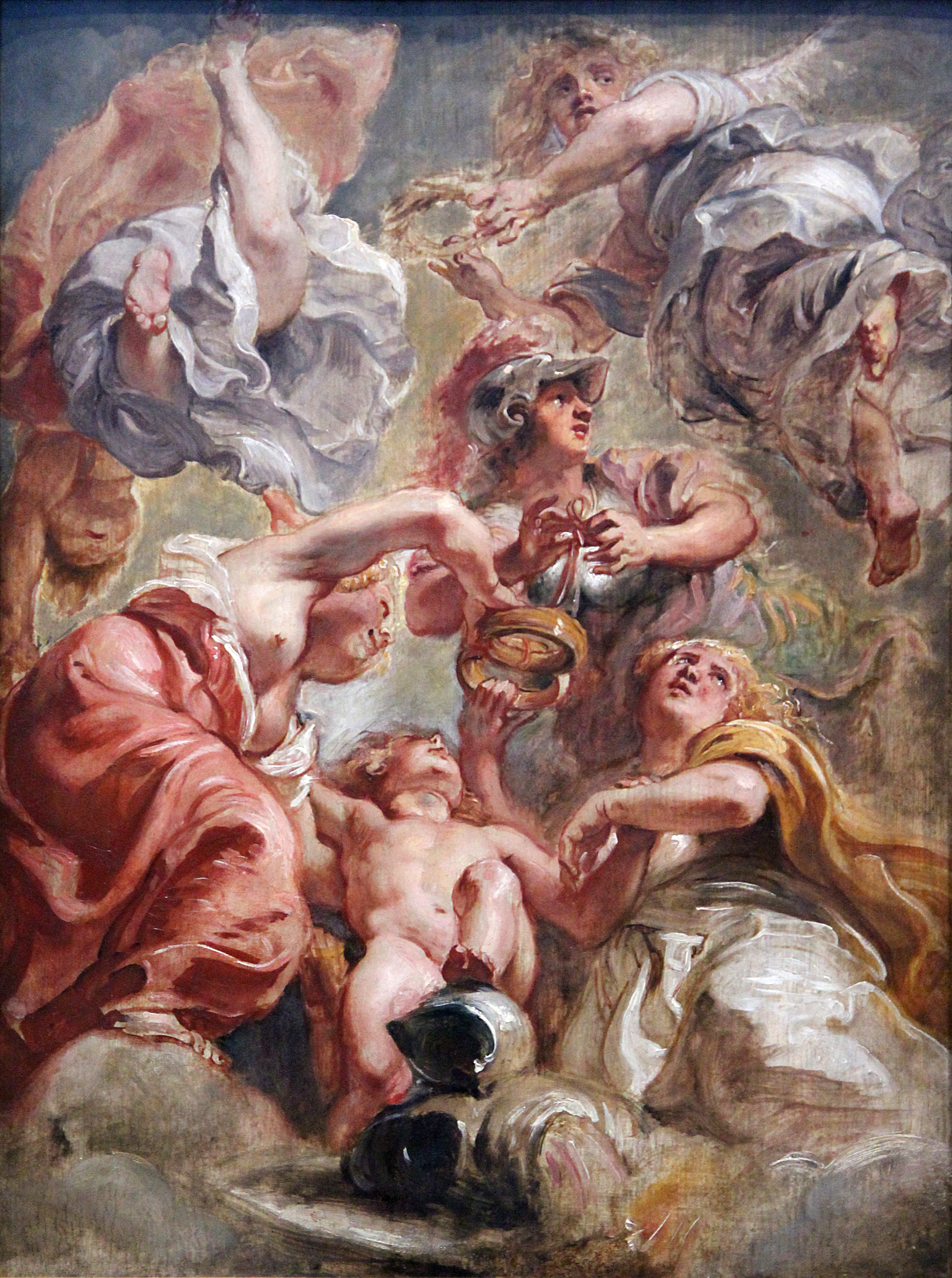
"England and Scotland with Minerva and Love" Allegorical work of the Union of the Crowns by Peter Paul Rubens

Whatever residual fears that many in England may have felt, James's arrival aroused a mood of high expectation. The twilight years of Elizabeth had been a disappointment, and for a nation troubled for so many years by the question of succession, the new king was a family man; that he already had male heirs was a promising sign that the succession would be stable in the medium term. However, James's honeymoon was of very short duration, and his initial political actions were to do much to create a rather negative tone, which was to turn a successful Scottish king into a disappointing English one. The greatest and most obvious was the question of his exact status and title.

In his first speech to his southern assembly on 19 March 1604 James gave a clear statement of the royal manifesto:

What God hath conjoined let no man separate. I am the husband and the whole isle is my lawful wife; I am the head and it is my body; I am the shepherd and it is my flock. I hope therefore that no man will think that I, a Christian King under the Gospel, should be a polygamist and husband to two wives; that I being the head should have a divided or monstrous body or that being the shepherd to so fair a flock should have my flock parted in two.

Parliament may very well have rejected "polygamy"; but James's ambitions were greeted with horror from the English parliament who feared the loss of the ancient and famous name of England. Legal objections were raised, with legal opinion at the time being that a union would end all established laws of both countries. For James, whose experience of parliaments was limited to the stage-managed and semi-feudal Scottish variety, the self-assurance – and obduracy – of the English version, which had long experience of upsetting monarchs, was an obvious shock. He decided to side-step the whole issue by unilaterally assuming the title of King of Great Britain by a Proclamation concerning the Kings Majesties Stile on 20 October 1604 announcing that he did "assume to Our selfe by the cleerenesse of our Right, The Name and Stile of KING OF GREAT BRITTAINE, FRANCE AND IRELAND, DEFENDER OF THE FAITH, &c." . This only deepened the offence. Even in Scotland there was little real enthusiasm for the project, though the two parliaments were eventually prodded into taking the whole matter 'under consideration'. Consider it they did for several years, never drawing the desired conclusion.

== Opposition ==
In Scotland there were early signs that many saw the risk of the "lesser being drawn by the greater", as Henry VII once predicted. An example before Scottish eyes was the case of Ireland, a kingdom in name, but since 1601, a subject nation in practice. The asymmetric relationship between Scotland and England had been evident for at least a decade. In 1589, the Spanish Armada shipwreck survivor Francisco de Cuellar sought refuge in Scotland, as he had heard the Scottish king "protected all the Spaniards who reached his kingdom, clothed them, and gave them passages to Spain". However, following his six-month ordeal within the kingdom, he concluded "the King of Scotland is nobody: nor does he possess the authority or position of a king: and he does not move a step, nor eat a mouthful, that is not by order of the Queen (Elizabeth I)".

John Russell, lawyer and writer, an initial enthusiast for "the happie and blissed Unioun betuixt the tua ancienne realmes of Scotland and Ingland" was later to warn James:

Lett it not begyne vith ane comedie, and end in ane tragedie; to be ane verball unioun in disparitie nor reall in conformity... hairby, to advance the ane kingdome, to great honor and beccome forȝetfull of the uther, sua to mak the samyn altogidder solitat and desoltat qhilk cannot stand vith your Majestie's honor. As god hes heichlie advanceit your Majestie lett Scotland qhilk is ȝour auldest impyir be partakeris of ȝour blissings.

Those fears were echoed by the Scottish Parliament, whose members were telling the King that they were "confident" that his plans for an incorporating union would not prejudice the ancient laws and liberties of Scotland; for any such hurt would mean that "it culd no more be a frie monarchie". James attempted to reassure his new English subjects that the new union would be much like that between England and Wales and that if Scotland should refuse, "he would compel their assents, having a stronger party there than the opposite party of the mutineers".

=== Commissions ===
In October 1604 English and Scottish MP's were appointed as commissioners to explore the creation of a perfect union. James closed the final session of his first parliament with a rebuke to his opponents in the House of Commons: "Here all things suspected.... He merits to be buried in the bottom of the sea that shall but think of separation, where God had made such a Union".

The Union Commission made some limited progress, on discrete issues such as hostile border laws, trade and citizenship. The borders were to become the "middle shires". Free trade proved contentious, as did the issue of equal rights before the law. Fears were openly expressed in the Westminster Parliament that English jobs would be threatened by all the poor people of the realm of Scotland, who will "draw near to the Sonn, and flocking hither in such Multitudes, that death and dearth is very probable to ensue". The exact status of the post nati, those born after the Union of March 1603, was not decided by Parliament but in the courts by Calvin's Case (1608), which extended property rights to all the King's subjects in English common law and allowed them to bring cases before the courts.

=== National animosity ===
Scottish aristocrats and other placeseekers made their way to London to compete for high positions in government. In 1617, Sir Anthony Weldon wrote of the poverty of Scotland, as conceived by English courtiers:

the Countrey ... is too good for those that possesse yt, and too bad for others to be at the charge of conquering yt. The ayre might be wholesome, but for the stincking people that inhabit yt ... Their beasts be generallie small (women excepted) of which sort there are no greater in the world.

A wounding observation came in the comedy Eastward Ho, a collaboration between Ben Jonson, George Chapman and John Marston. In enthusing over the good life to be had in the Colony of Virginia, it is observed:

And then you shal live freely there, without Sergeants, or Courtiers, or Lawyers, or Intelligencers – onely a few industrious Scots perhaps, who indeed are disperst over the face of the whole earth. But as for them, there are no greater friends of Englishmen and England, when they are out an't, in the world, then they are. And for my part, I would a hundred thousand of them were there, for wee are all one Countrymen now, yee know; and wee shoulde finde ten times more comfort of them there, then wee do here.

Anti-English satires proliferated, and in 1609, the king had an act passed that promised the direst penalties against the writers of "pasquillis, libellis, rymis, cockalanis, comedies and sicklyk occasiones whereby they slander and maligne and revile the estait and countrey of England..."

In October 1605 Nicolò Molin, the Venetian ambassador in London, noted that "the question of the Union will, I am assured, be dropped; for His Majesty is now well aware that nothing can be effected, both sides displaying such obstinacy that an accommodation is impossible; and so his Majesty is resolved to abandon the question for the present, in hope that time may consume the ill-humours".

== Symbols ==
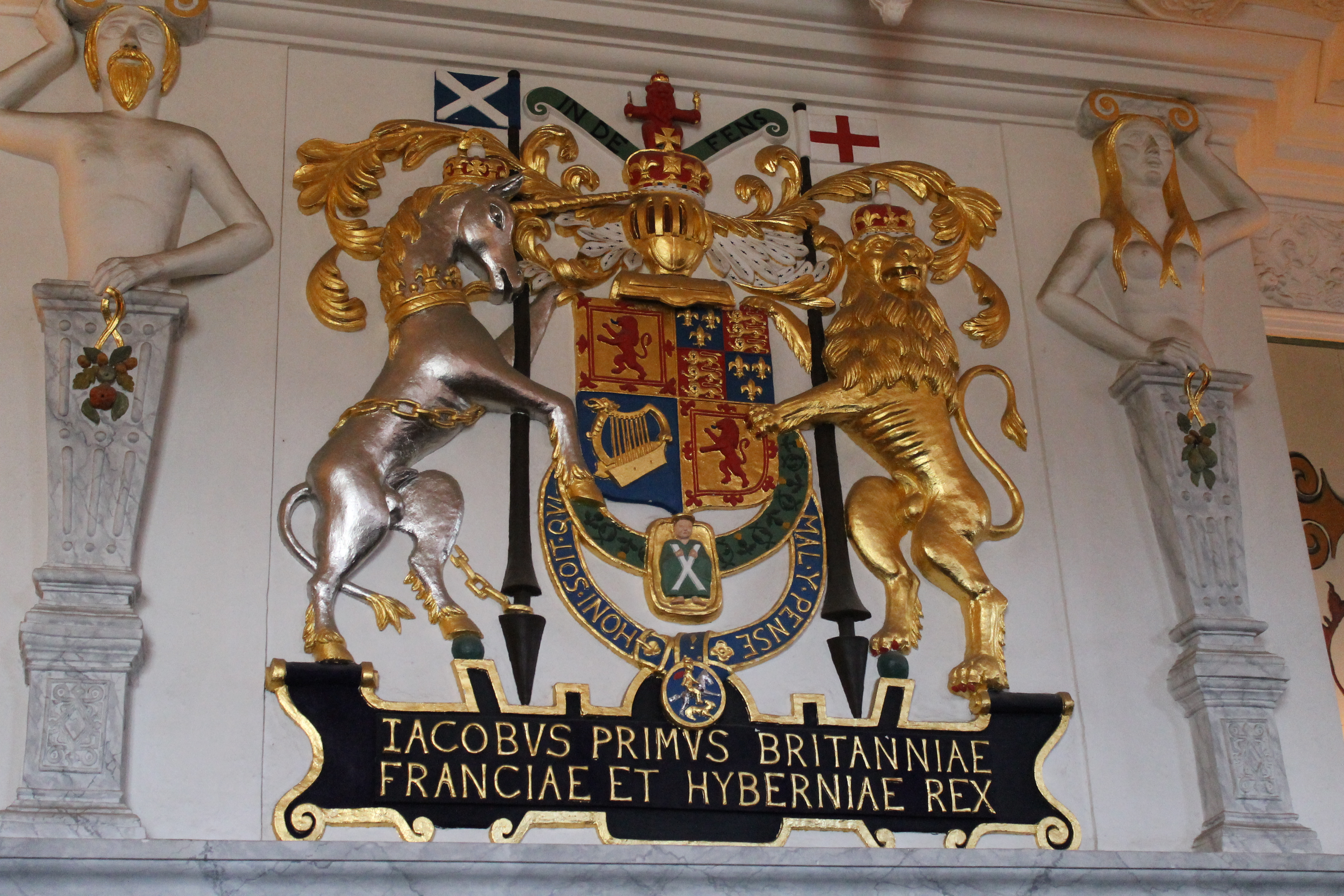
Arms of James VI and I in Edinburgh Castle, giving the Scottish elements precedence

King James devised new coats of arms and a uniform coinage. The creation of a national flag proved contentious, designs acceptable to one side typically offending the other. James finally proclaimed the new Union Flag on 12 April 1606: Scots who saw in it a St George's Cross superimposed upon a St Andrew's Saltire sought to create their own 'Scotch' design, which saw the reverse superimposition take place. (that design was used in Scotland until 1707). For years afterwards, vessels of the two nations continued to fly their respective "flags", the royal proclamation notwithstanding. The Union Flag entered into common use only under Cromwell's Protectorate.

Arms of the Kingdom of Scotland, 1565–1603

Arms of the Kingdom of England, 1558–1603

Arms of the Kingdom of Ireland, 1541–1603

Arms of the Kingdom of Scotland, 1603–1707

Arms of the Kingdom of England and the Kingdom of Ireland, 1603–1707

The flag of the Kingdom of Scotland

The flag of the Kingdom of England

Union Flag used in the Kingdom of Scotland from the early 17th century to 1707

Union Flag used in the Kingdom of England, 1606–1707

The Tudor rose dimidiated with the Scottish thistle, James used the device as a royal heraldic badge

== See also ==
- Commonwealth realm
- Catholic Monarchs of Spain
- Imperial Federation
