= Remonstrance =

Remonstrance may refer to:

- Remonstrances, a document drafted by the earls in opposition to King Edward I of England in 1297
- Remonstrance of 1317, a document sent by the Irish allies of King Edward I of England during the Irish-Bruce Wars
- Remonstrance Bureau, a government agency during the Song and Jurchen Jin dynasties
- Grand Remonstrance, a list of grievances presented to King Charles I of England in 1641
- Five articles of Remonstrance, a doctrine, from 1610, observed by followers of the Dutch Protestant theologian Jacobus Arminius
  - Counter Remonstrance of 1611, the Dutch Reformed Churches' response to the Remonstrants' Five Articles of Remonstrance
- Flushing Remonstrance, a 1657 precursor to the Bill of Rights in the United States
- Remonstrance to the King, Scots poem by William Dunbar
- Western Remonstrance, signed in October 1650 by Scotsmen who demanded that the Act of Classes (1649) was enforced (removing Engagers from the army and other influential positions) and remonstrating against Charles, the son of the recently beheaded King Charles I, being crowned King of Scotland.

== See also ==
- Humble Petition and Advice – a remonstrance presented to Oliver Cromwell that led to the 1657 constitution of England, Scotland and Ireland
- Irish Remonstrance (disambiguation)
- Remonstrant Brotherhood – Dutch Reformed Christian movement
