= He Is Na Dog, He Is a Lam =

Poem by William Dunbar

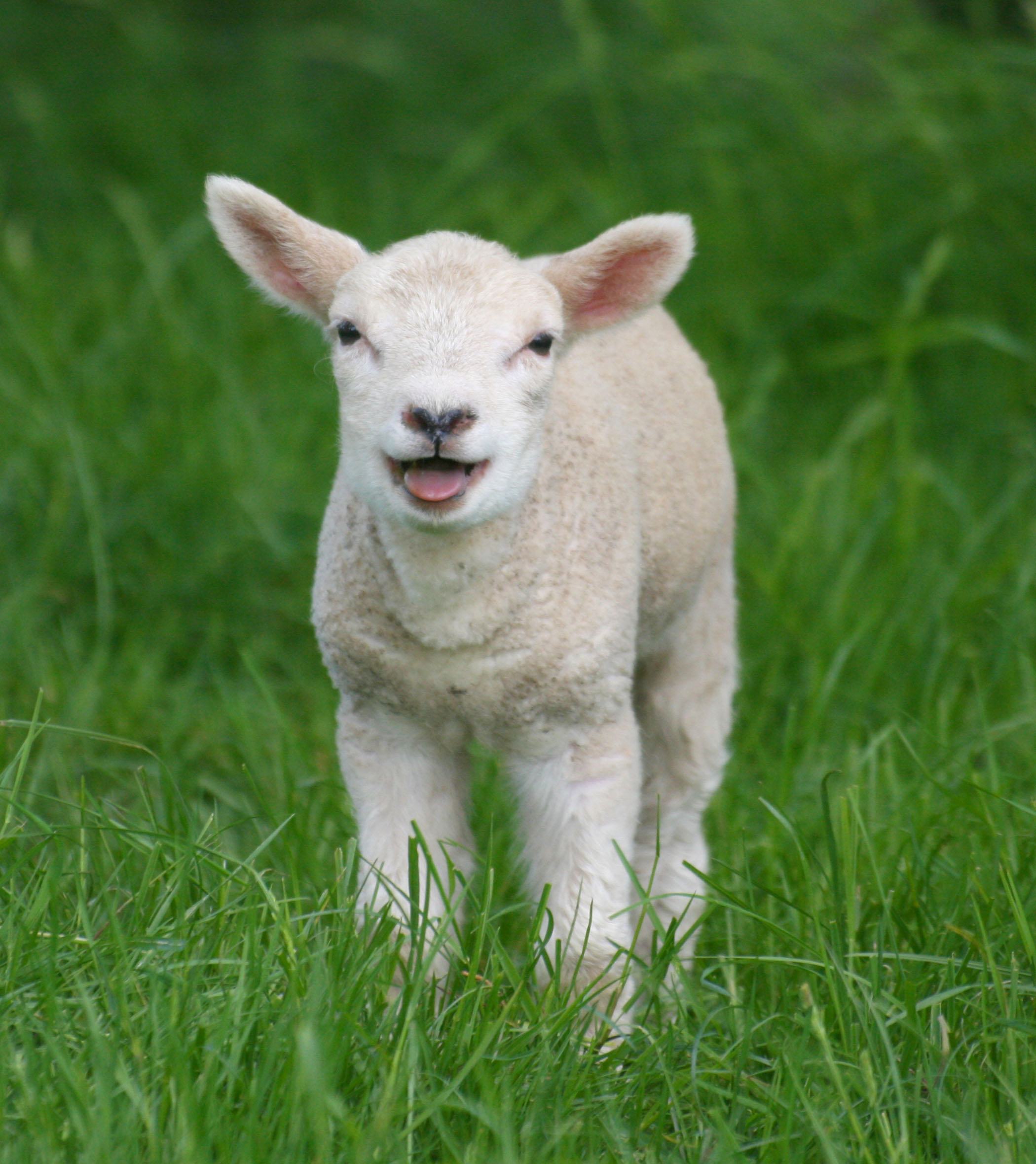
Do weill to James, your wardraipair, Quhais faythfull bruder maist freind I am. He is na dog, he is a lam.

He Is Na Dog, He Is A Lam is a poem by William Dunbar addressed to Queen Margaret Tudor of Scotland.

The poem's theme follows from the same author's work "Of James Dog" in which Dunbar complained about the allegedly rude behaviour of the Queen's servant of the same name. He worked in the wardrobe and sometimes carried letters. James Dog was referred to as "A dangerous dog".

In He Is Na Dog, He Is A Lam Dunbar declares to have renounced his former opinions of the "dangerous dog" because, apparently, he has been helpful to the poet. James Dog is subsequently compared to a lamb.

However, for reasons which are not explained, it is clear that Dunbar's change of heart is insincere. While praising Dog extravagantly for his good nature and helpfulness, the poet introduces new insults far more offensive than the previous ones.

The poem's text is found in the Maitland Folio Manuscript, entitled "Of the Aforesaid James Dog," which has the postscript "Quod Dunbar of the said James quhen he had plesett him."

== The Poem ==
Dunbar appeals to the Queen to treat his "faithful brother" well.

O gracious Princes, guid and fair,
Do weill to James, your wardraipair,
Quhais faythfull bruder maist freind I am.
He is na dog, he is a lam.

He asserts that, although he joked with James Dog in verse, no malice was intended. He merely wanted to entertain the Queen.

Thocht I in ballet did with him bourde,
In malice spack I nevir an woord,
Bot all, my dame, to do you gam.
He is na dog, he is a lam.

He dispenses more praise for Dog.

Your hienes can nocht gett ane meter,
To keip your wardrope nor discreter,
To rewle your robbis and dres the sam.
He is na dog, he is a lam.

Then with mock sympathy for the man he has just praised he prays that Dog's wife, who supposedly beats her husband, should be "drowned in a dam."

The wyff that he had in his innis,
That with the taingis wald braek his schinnis,
I wald schou drownet war in a dam.
He is na dog, he is a lam.

Mrs. Dog, who is also unfaithful to her husband, should be "thoroughly beaten with a rail".

The wyff that wald him kuckald mak,
I wald schou war bayth syd and back,
Weill batteret with ane barrou tram.
He is na dog, he is a lam.

Dunbar then seamlessly returns to his praise of the "obedient" James Dog and so concludes the poem.

He hes sa weill doin me obey,
In till all thing thairfoir I pray,
That nevir dolour mak him dram.
He is na dog, he is a lam.
