= The Complaint of the Black Knight =

1508 poem by John Lydgate

The Complaint of the Black Knight is a poem by the English monk John Lydgate.

One edition is the oldest surviving book printed in Scotland that displays the printing date: 4 April 1508 (see 1508 in poetry). In 2010 it was chosen by UNESCO to become part of its Memory of the World Register. Printed in Edinburgh by Chepman and Myllar, the book was often falsely attributed in Scotland as a work of Geoffrey Chaucer.

== See also ==
- The Flyting of Dumbar and Kennedie
- Global spread of the printing press
