= The Twa Cummeris =

Scots poem by William Dunbar

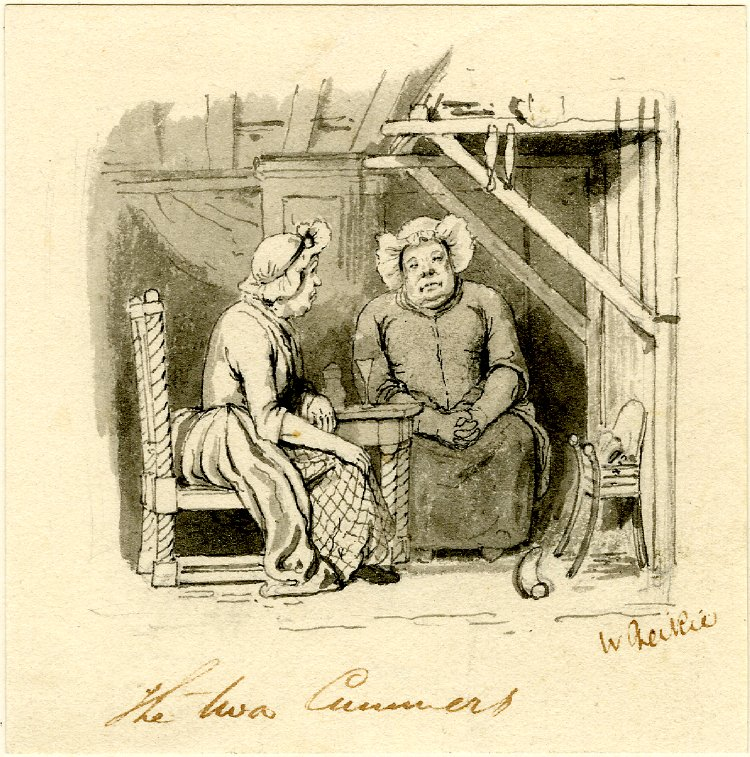
"The Twa Cummeris" illustrated by Walter Geikie in the early nineteenth century. (British Museum).

"The Twa Cummeris", also rendered as "The Twa Cumeris", is a short humorous poem in Middle Scots written at an unknown date by William Dunbar (born 1459 or 1460)

The poem takes the form of a dialogue during Lent between two close female confidants who have become indiscreet due to the drinking of wine.

The women are depicted as being insincere in their observation of Lent and of being manipulative with regard to their husbands.

The noun cummer has no precise equivalent in English. The Concise Scots Dictionary defines it, literally, as a godmother and, figuratively, as "a female intimate or friend; a gossip." It is spelt interchangeably as cumer.

The source texts of the poem are the Bannatyne Manuscript, the Maitland Folio and a side-note in the Minute Book of Sassines of Aberdeen. The texts vary in several respects and the version given in this article is that formulated by William Mackay Mackenzie in 1932.

== Synopsis ==
On the first day of Lent two friends are drinking wine and talking. One, groaning while she drinks, complains that This long Lent makes me lean.

Rycht airlie on Ask Weddinsday,
Drynkand the wyne satt cumeris tway.
The tane cowth to the tother complene,
Graneand and suppand cowd scho say,
"This lang Lentern makis me lene."

In spite of being large and fat she insists that she is feeling weak due to the Lenten fast. She affirms that This long Lent makes me lean.

On cowch besyd the fyre scho satt,
God wait gif scho wes grit and fatt,
Yit to be feble scho did hir fene,
And ay scho said "Latt preif of that,
This Lang Lentern makis me lene."

Her companion is supportive. She tells her friend that her austere tastes were inherited from her mother.

"My fair sweit cummer," quod the tuder,
"Ye tak that nigertnes of your mother,"

She says that the late mother would drink no wine except mavasy a strong, sweet, expensive, fortified beverage similar to madeira. This long Lent makes me lean she adds.

All wyne to test scho wald disdane,
Bot mavasy scho bad nane uder.
This lang Lentern makis me lene.

She tells the other that she should refrain from fasting and, suggestively, that her husband should suffer instead, then adds This long Lent makes me lean.

"Cummer, be glaid both evin and morrow,
Thocht ye suld bayth beg and borrow,
Fra our lang fasting ye yow refrene,
And latt your husband dre the sorrow.
This lang Lentern makis me lene."

The first cummer agrees with her friend's advice. She states that Everything I do is to annoy him then adds that he has little value in bed and proposes a toast; This long Lent makes me lean.

"Your counsale, cummer, is gud" quod scho,
"All is to tene him that I do,
In bed he is nocht wirth a bene,
Fill fow the glass and drynk me to,
This lang Lentern makis me lene."

The pair set to drinking a chopin jug of wine. They are determined That Lentrune suld nocht mak thame lene.

Off wyne owt of ane choppyne stowp,
They drank twa quartis, sowp and sowp,
Off drowth sic exces did thame strene.
Be than to mend thay had gud howp,
That Lentrune suld nocht mak thame lene.

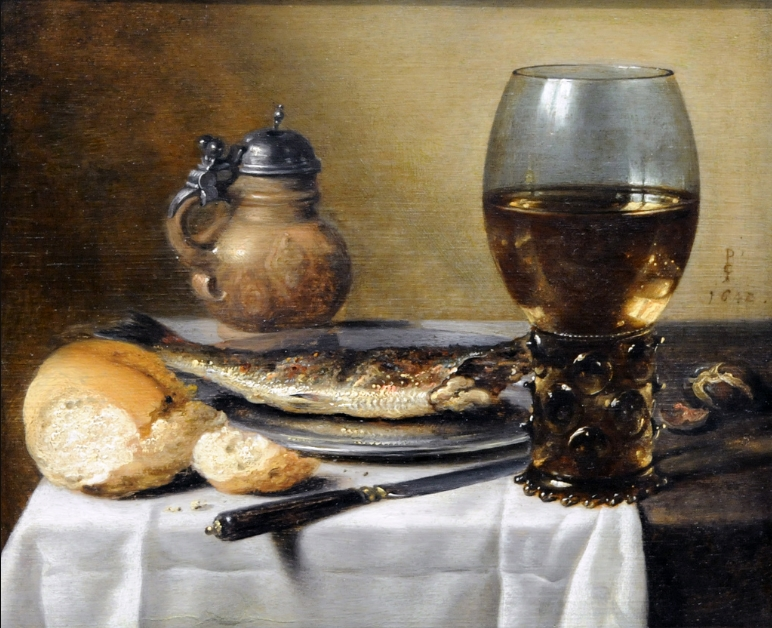
Fill fow the glass and drynk me to. A still-life by Pieter Claesz, 1642
