= Meditatioun In Wyntir =

Scots poem by William Dunbar

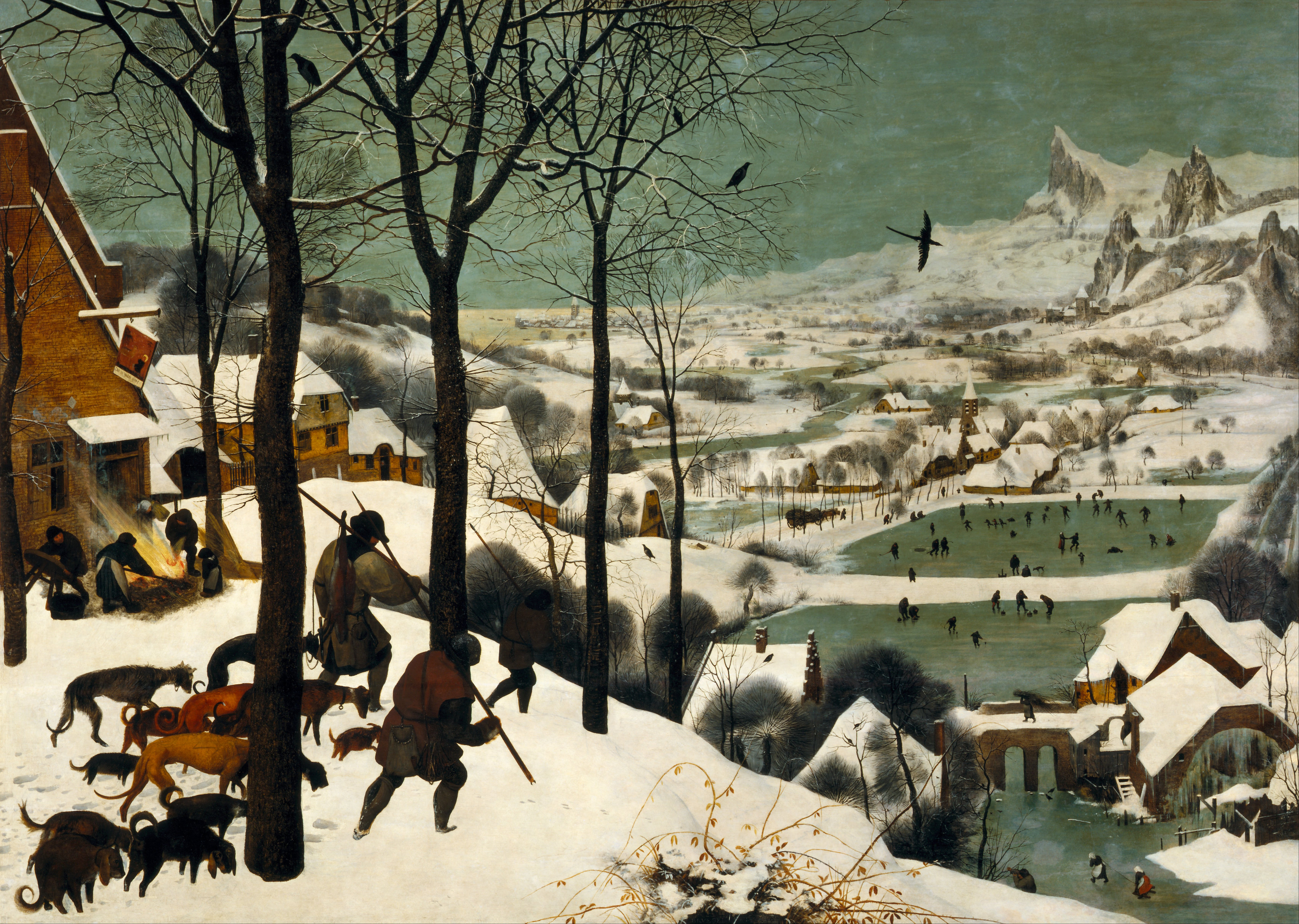
Into thir dirk and drublie dayis, Quhone sabill all the hevin arrayis. The Hunters in the Snow depicts Winter in Northern Europe during the sixteenth century.

Meditatioun In Wyntir is a contemplative poem in Scots by William Dunbar (born 1459 or 1460).

In the work, Dunbar describes how Winter lowers his spirits. While beset by melancholy and insomnia, he meditates indecisively on thwarted ambition, ageing and mortality, causing him to become depressed. The approaching end of Winter restores his sense of hope.

The poem seems to be inspired by Dunbar's personal experience; his brief reference to dissatisfaction of life "into this court" might be interpreted as referring to the royal court of King James IV.

The text is preserved in the Maitland Folio Manuscript.

== Synopsis ==
Meditatioun In Wyntir is composed in a sober, thoughtful style in ten stanzas of five lines each. It opens with a description of the season and the depressing effect of its weather and lengthening nights. The poet cannot find pleasure in songs, poetry or plays.

Into thir dirk and drublie dayis,
Quhone sabill all the hevin arrayis,
With mystie vapouris, cluddis, and skyis,
Nature all curage me denyis,
Of sangis, ballattis, and of playis.

Quhone that the nycht dois lenthin houris,
With wind, with haill, and havy schouris,
My dule spreit dois lurk for schoir,
My hairt for langour dois forloir,
For laik of symmer with his flouris.

Suffering from insomnia and the "heavy thoughts" that accompany it, his mind is troubled.

I walk, I turne, sleip may I nocht,
I vexit am with havie thocht,
'his warld all ovir I cast about,
And ay the mair I am in dout,
The mair that I remeid have socht.

He is visited by four personifications, who offer him conflicting advice. "Despair" tells him that he must find a reliable livelihood or face an unhappy and difficult life.

I am assayit on everie syde,
Despair sayis ay, In tyme provyde,
And get sumthing quhairon to leif,
Or with grit trouble and mischeif,
Thow sall into this court abyd.

"Patience" disagrees and urges the poet to be steady and hopeful that his luck will change. "Fortune's" anger can not be appeased with reason, she adds.

Than Patience sayis, Be not agast,
Hald Hoip and Treuthe within the fast,
And lat Fortoun wirk furthe hir rage,
Quhome that no rasoun may assuage,
Quhill that hir glas be run and past.

"Prudence" then accuses him of being inconsistent in his aims. He clings to things that cannot last. He is "tending to another place" and "making a journey every day."

And Prudence in my eir sayis ay,
Quhy wald thow hald that will away?
Or craif that thow may have no space,
Thow tending to ane uther place,
A journay going everie day.

"Age", in exceptionally friendly terms, invites the poet to take his hand then reminds him that he will eventually have to "make account" for his life.

And than sayis Age, My freind, cum neir,
And be not strange I thee requeir,
Cum, brodir, by the hand me tak,
Remember thow hes compt to mak,
Of all thi tyme thow spendit heir.

Death opens his gates and says bluntly, "Through there, you will abide", adding "You will stoop under this lintel, there is no other way".

Syne Deid castis upe his yettis wyd,
Saying Thir oppin sall the abyd,
Albeid that thow wer never sa stout,
Undir this lyntall sall thow lowt,
Thair is nane uther way besyde.

No pleasure can stop the poet from dwelling on his unhappy thoughts.

For feir of this all day I drowp,
No gold in kist nor wyne in cowp,
No ladeis bewtie nor luiffis blys,
May lat me to remember this,
How glaid that ever I dyne or sowp.

Only the shortening of the nights begins to restore his happiness. He longs for the arrival of Summer.

Yit quhone the nycht begynnis to schort,
It dois my spreit sum pairt confort,
Of thocht oppressit with the schowris,
Cum, lustie Symmer with thi flowris,
That I may leif in sum disport.
