= The Petition of The Gray Horse, Auld Dunbar =

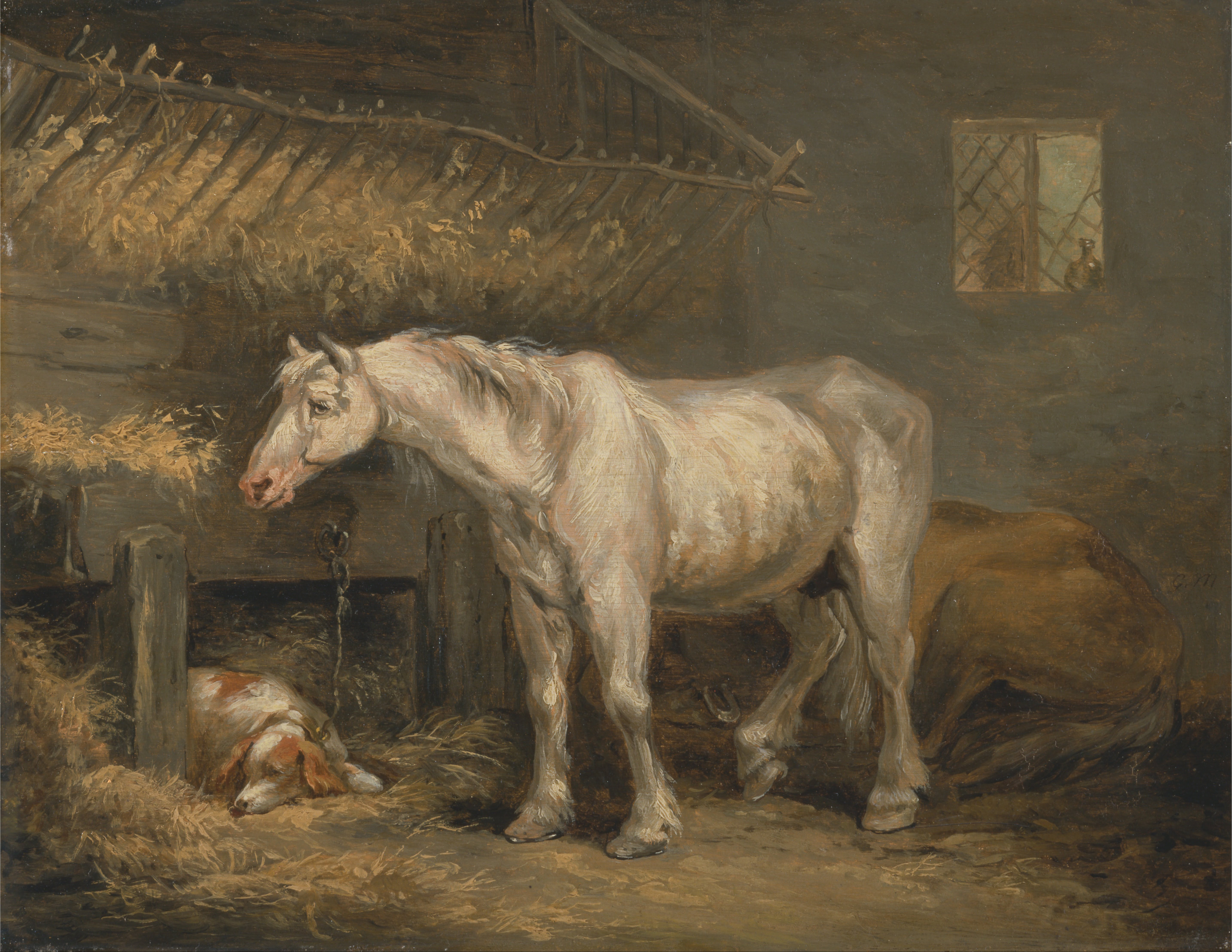
I am ane auld hors, as ye knaw, That ever in duill dois drug and draw.

The Petition Of The Gray Horse, Auld Dunbar is an appeal by the Scots poet William Dunbar to his patron King James IV of Scotland in which he requests a new gown to mark Christmas.

In the poem, Dunbar presents himself as an old, worn-out horse in need of a horsecloth to keep him warm during Yule. The equine metaphor is sustained throughout the poem. By comparing human affairs with those of horses, Dunbar depicts his career as being one of longstanding, loyal but poorly rewarded service to the King.

A royal gift of clothes, known as livery, was seen as a sign of special favour. It would have been valued for the prestige gained as well as for the garments themselves.

The petition may well have been successful. On two occasions Dunbar was recorded as receiving Christmas gifts of clothing from the King.

The poem is found in the Reidpeth Manuscript and as a fragment in the Maitland Folio Manuscript.

== The Petition ==
The poet opens with an appeal to the King which will occur as a refrain throughout the work,

Schir, lat it never in toune be tald,
That I suld be ane Yowllis yald.

A "yald" was a worn-out horse or jade and the phrase "yowllis yald" was apparently a disparaging term for someone dressed shabbily at Yule.

He claims that, even if he were old, jaded cart-horse, put out to pasture in distant Strathnaver, he would still be given a horsecloth ("hous") and stall at Christmas.

Suppois I war ane ald jaid aver,
Schott furth our clewch to squische the clever,
And hed the strenthis of all Strenever,
I wald at Youll be housit and stald:
Schir, lat it never in toune be tald
That I suld be ane Yowllis yald.

He then claims to be a dutiful old horse who has been driven away from the stalls by "great court horses" to subsist on moss in the open.

I am ane auld hors, as ye knaw,
That ever in duill dois drug and draw.
Gryt court hors puttis me fra the staw,
To fang the fog be firthe and fald.
Schir, lat it never in toune be tald
That I suld be ane Yowllis yald.

The white-maned Dunbar complains that while other horses were fed with bran he had to make do with grass. The poet is clearly alluding to a career at court which he believes has not been properly rewarded.

My maine is turned into quhyt,
And thairof ye heff all the wyt.
Quhen uthair hors hed brane to byt,
I gat bot gris, grype giff I wald.

The metaphor continues throughout the poem,

I was never dautit into stabell.
My lyff hes bein so miserabell,

The "stable" might represent the Church office which Dunbar often pleaded for.

He insists that, although court life has worn him down and made him "an over-burdened mule", he would be "spurred-on in every joint" if he could wear "trappings" at Yule.

The court hes done my curage cuill
And maid me ane forriddin muill.
Yett to weir trapperis at the Yuill,
I wald be spurrit at everie spald.

Dunbar concludes by recording that, although he may not be treated like "chargers in silk trappings" he would be content with a new "horsecloth" to protect him against the Christmas cold.

Thocht in the stall I be not clappit,
As cursouris that in silk beine trappit,
With ane new hous I wald be happit
Aganis this Crysthinmes for the cald.
Schir, lett it nevir in toun be tald
That I sould be ane Yuillis yald.

== Respontio Regis ==
Dunbar's petition is accompanied by a postscript entitled "Respontio Regis" or "The King's Response". It purports to be the King's poetic instructions to his treasurer that Dunbar's request should be granted. It commands that "Auld Dumbar" must be taken in and "dressed like a bishop's mule".

The "Respontio Regis" is composed in simple rhyming couplets and relatively plain language suggestive of an amateur poet. It is not clear whether it is genuinely the work of James IV.

Item, to Maister William Dunbar, be the Kingis command, for caus he wantit his goun at Yule. 5 pounds.

— Entry from the Accounts of the Lord High Treasurer. 27th of January 1506

Respontio Regis

Efter our wrettingis, thesaurer,
Tak in this gray hors, auld Dumbar,
Quhilk in my aucht with service trew
In lyart changeit is his hew.
Gar hows him new aganis this Yuill
And busk him lyk ane bischopis muill,
For with my hand I have indost
To pay quhatevir his trappouris cost.
