= The Dregy of Dunbar =

Humorous poem by William Dunbar

we folk of paradys, in Edinburgh with all merynes. A depiction of Edinburgh by John Slezer.

The Dregy Of Dunbar also known as Dumbaris Dirige to the King is a humorous poem in Scots and Latin composed by William Dunbar (born 1459 or 1460). at an unknown date.

The Dregy is apparently an appeal to James IV of Scotland asking him to return to Edinburgh from an extended period of residence in Stirling in order to make life more pleasant for his courtiers.

It takes the form of a parody of the Office of the Dead. This ritual was a prayer for the benefit of souls in Purgatory intended to help them into Heaven. Thus, Stirling is comically compared to purgatory and Edinburgh to Heaven.

The unflattering comparison is continued by the poet throughout the work. Stirling is repeatedly depicted as being dull, austere and uncomfortable when compared to the sophisticated pleasures of the capital.

The text is preserved in the Maitland Folio Manuscript and the Bannatyne Manuscript. In the latter it is subtitled Dumbaris dirige to the king bydand ouir lang in Stirling.

== Synopsis ==
=== The Introduction ===
Out of pity, the courtiers of Edinburgh, 'here in heaven's glory' are writing to their fellows in Stirling 'where neither pleasure nor delight is'.

We that ar heir in hevynnis glorie,
To you that ar in purgatorie,
Commendis us on hartlie wys,
I mene we folk of paradys.
In Edinburgh with all merynes,
To yow at Striveling in distres,
Quhair nowdir plesour nor delyt is,
For pietie this epistell wrytis.

The Stirling courtiers are addressed as if they were 'hermits and anchorites that combine penance with dining'.

O ye heremytis and ankirsadillis
That takkis your pennance at your tabillis
And eitis no meit restorative
Nor drinkis no wyne confortative
Nor aill, bot that is thin and small,
With few coursis into your hall,

In addition to their meagre diet, they have no good company nor any entertainment.

But cumpany of lordis and knychtis,
Or ony uther gudlie wychtis,
Solitar walking your alone,
Seing nothing bot stok and stone.

The people of Edinburgh declare that, in order to bring the Stirling folk out of their 'painfull purgatory', they will begin a Dirge to 'deliver them from their annoyance' and 'bring them soon to Edinburgh's joy to be merry among us'.

Out of your panefull purgatorie,
To bring yow to the blys and glorie,
Of Edinburcht, the myrrie town.
We sall begin ane cairfull sown,
Ane dirige devoit and meik,
The Lord of blys doing beseik
Yow to delyver out of your noy
And bring yow sone to Edinburgh joy,
For to be merye amangis us.
The dirige begynnis thus,

=== The Dregy ===
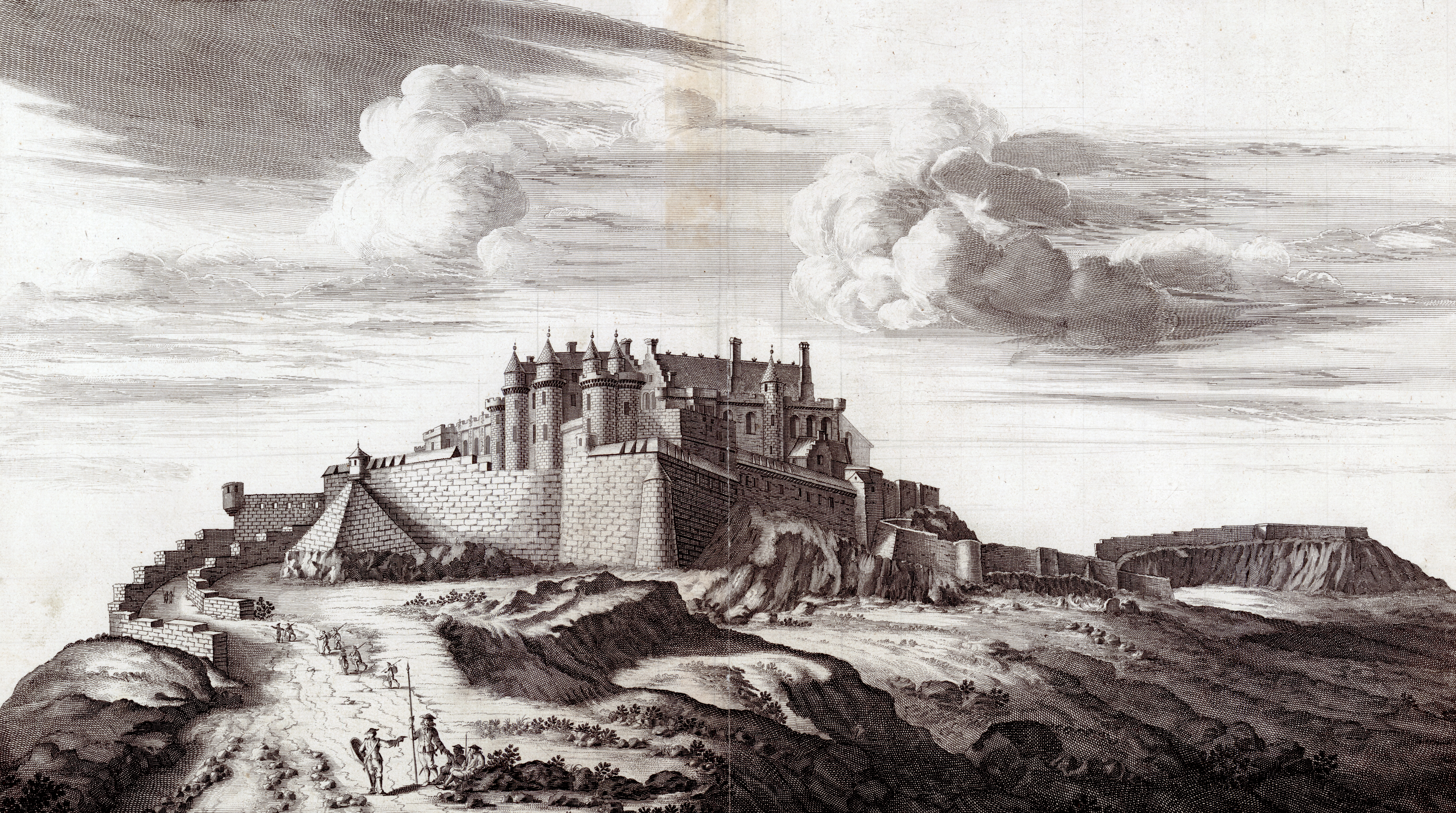
Striveling, everie court manis foo. Slezer's depiction of Stirling castle.

The dregy consists of three lessons and responses

The pretence of being addressed to the whole court is abandoned. Subsequently, the language is ambiguous as to whether it is addressing the entire court or the king alone.

==== The First Lesson and Response ====
The first lesson prays that 'all the heavenly court divine' will deliver the court from the 'pain and woe' of Stirling unto the many virtues of the capital.

Lectio prima

The Fader, the Sone, the Holie Gaist,
The blissit Marie, virgen chaist,
Of angellis all the ordour nyne,
And all the hevinlie court divyne,
Sone bring yow fra the pyne and wo,
Of Striveling, everie court manis foo,
Agane to Edinburchtis joy and blys,
Quhair wirschip, welthe, and weilfair is,
Play, plesance eik, and honestie.
Say ye amen, for chirritie.

The first response reinforces the message.

Responsio

Tak consolatioun in your payne,
In tribulatioun tak consolatioun,
Out of vexatioun cum hame agayne,
Tak consolatioun in your payne.
Out of distres of Stirling town
To Edinburgh blys God mak you bown.

==== The Second Lesson and Response ====
The second lesson makes another appeal for deliverance for the courtiers of Stirling. Various senior heavenly figures are invoked. The fine foods and wines available in Edinburgh are then dwelt upon at length.

Lectio secunda

Patriarchis, prophetis, apostillis deir,
Confessouris, virgynis, and martyris cleir,
And all the saitt celestiall,
Devoitlie we upone thame call,
That sone out of your paynis fell,
Ye may in hevin heir with us duell,
To eit swan, cran, peirtrik, and pluver,
And everie fische that swowmis in rever,
To drink withe us the new fresche wyne
That grew apone the revar of Ryne,
Fresche fragrant claretis out of France,
Of Angeo and of Orliance,
With mony ane cours of grit daynté.
Say ye amen, for chirrité.

The second response appeals to God and Saint Giles, a favourite saint of Edinburgh, to convey the Stirling court to 'solace and joy'.

Responsio

God and Sanct Geill heir yow convoy,
Baythe sone and weill, God and Sanct Geill,
To sonce and seill, solace and joy,
God and Sanct Geill heir yow convoy.
Out of Stirling paynis fell,
In Edinburgh joy sone mot ye dwell.

==== The Third Lesson and Response ====
The third lesson appeals to all the saints. It is the longest and most elaborate of the three. The remaining pretence of being addressed to the whole court seems to end. Dunbar appears to be speaking directly to his king.

Lectio tertia

We pray to all the sanctis in Hevin,
That ar abuif the sternis sevin,
Yow to delyver out of your pennance,
That ye may sone play, sing, and dance
And into Edinburgh mak gud cheir,
Quhair welthe and weilfair is, but weir.

Dunbar writes that he intends to visit Stirling, like Gabriel, to inform the inhabitants of 'purgatory' that their 'tribulation' was over, allowing them to pass to 'heaven'.

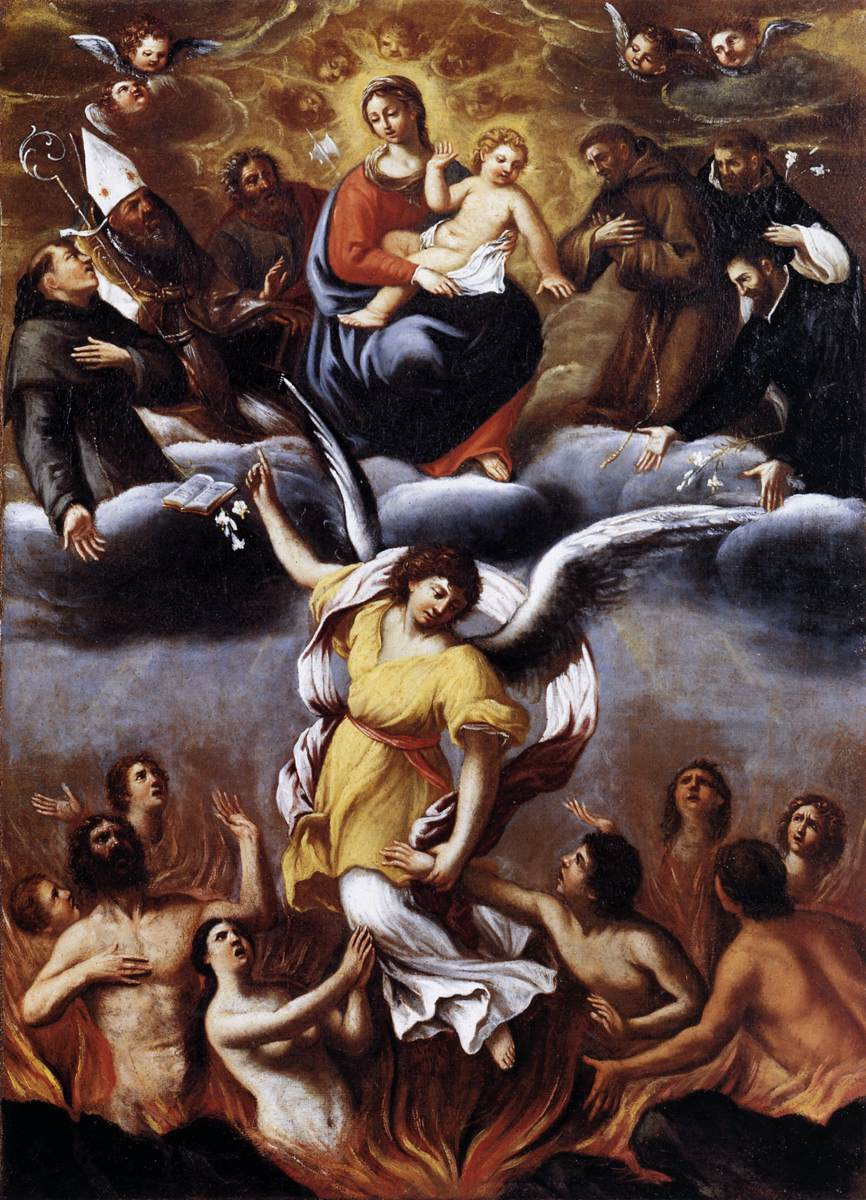
An angel releasing souls from purgatory. Ludovico Carracci. Sixteenth century.

And I that dois your paynis discryve,
Thinkis for to visie you belyve,
Nocht in desert with yow to duell,
Bot as the angell Gabriell,
Dois go betweyne fra Hevynis glorie,
To thame that ar in Purgatorie,
And in thair tribulatioun,
To gif thame consolatioun,
And schaw thame quhone thair pane is past,
Thay sall to Hevin cum at the last,
And how nane servis to have sweitnes
That never taistit bittirnes.

A final appeal is made to abandon 'penance and abstinence' and to return before the start of Christmas celebrations.

And thairfoir how sould ye considdir,
Of Edinburgh blys quhone ye cum hiddir,
Bot gif ye taistit had befoir,
Of Stirling toun the paynis soir
And thairfoir tak in patience,
Your pennance and your abstinence,
And ye sall cum or Yule begyn,
Into the blys that we ar in,
Quhilk grant the glorious Trinité.
Say ye amen, for chirrité.

The third response makes yet another dig at the 'hideous hell' of Stirling and its allegedly poor foods. The king is twice urged to 'cum hame'.

Responsio

Cum hame and duell no mair in Stirling,
Fra hyddows hell cum hame and duell,
Quhair fische to sell is nane bot spyrling,
Cum hame and duell na mair in Stirling.

=== The Conclusion ===
The poem concludes with a mock Latin prayer. In a style reminiscent of the Goliards, its language echoes that of the Office of the Dead as well as that of the Lord's Prayer and the Requiem. Stirling continues to be vilified for its gloom when compared to Edinburgh.

The translations given are those of the twentieth-century scholar of Dunbar, William Mackay Mackenzie.

Et ne nos inducas in tentationem de Stirling,
Sed libera nos a malo eiusdem.
(Lead us not into the temptation of Stirling, but deliver us from its evil.)

Requiem Edinburgi dona eis, Domine,
Et lux ipsius luceat eis.
(Give them the rest of Edinburgh, Lord, and let its light shine upon them.)
A porta tristitiae de Stirling,
Erue, Domine, animas et corpora eorum.
(From the dolourous gate of Stirling deliver, Lord, their souls and bodies.)
Credo gustare vinum Edinburgi,
In villa viventium.
(I believe that they will yet taste the wine of Edinburgh in the land of the living.)
Requiescant statim in Edinburgo. Amen.
(May they rest in Edinburgh at once. Amen.)

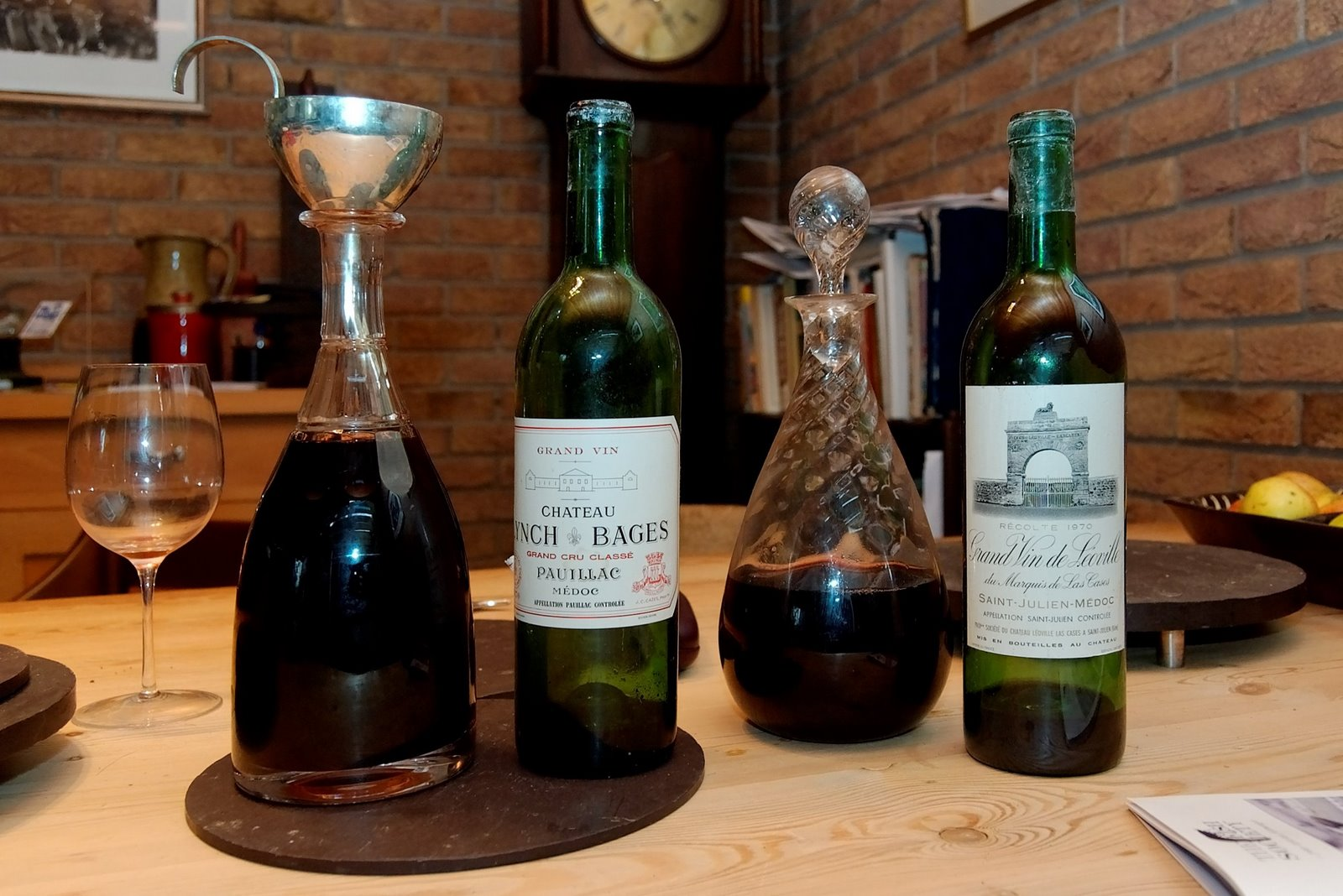
Fresche fragrant claretis.

Domine, exaudi orationem meam,
Et clamor meus ad te veniat.
Oremus.
(Lord, hear my prayer and let my cry come unto thee! Let us pray.)

Deus qui iustos et corde humiles ex eorum tribulatione,
liberare dignatus es. Libera famulos tuos apud villam,
de Stirling versantes a penis et tristitiis eiusdem, et ad
Edinburgi gaudia feliciter perducas. Amen.

(Oh God, who deignest to free the just and humble-of-heart from all their tribulation,
liberate thy children who live in the town of Stirling, from its pains and sorrows,
and bring them to the joys of Edinburgh, that Stirling may be at rest.)

== Historical Context ==
After Edinburgh, Stirling was the residence most favoured by James IV.

Stirling Castle underwent major building work during his reign.

His mistress Margaret Drummond had resided at the castle in 1496 and, after Drummond's death in 1502 until 1508, their illegitimate daughter was raised there.

The king spent regular Easter retreats at the burgh's Franciscan friary, which he had founded. Given that the Franciscans were famous for their frugal Mendicant conduct, it seems possible that the poem's many references to penance and abstinence are not entirely comical.
