= Remonstrance to the King =

16th-century poem by William Dunbar

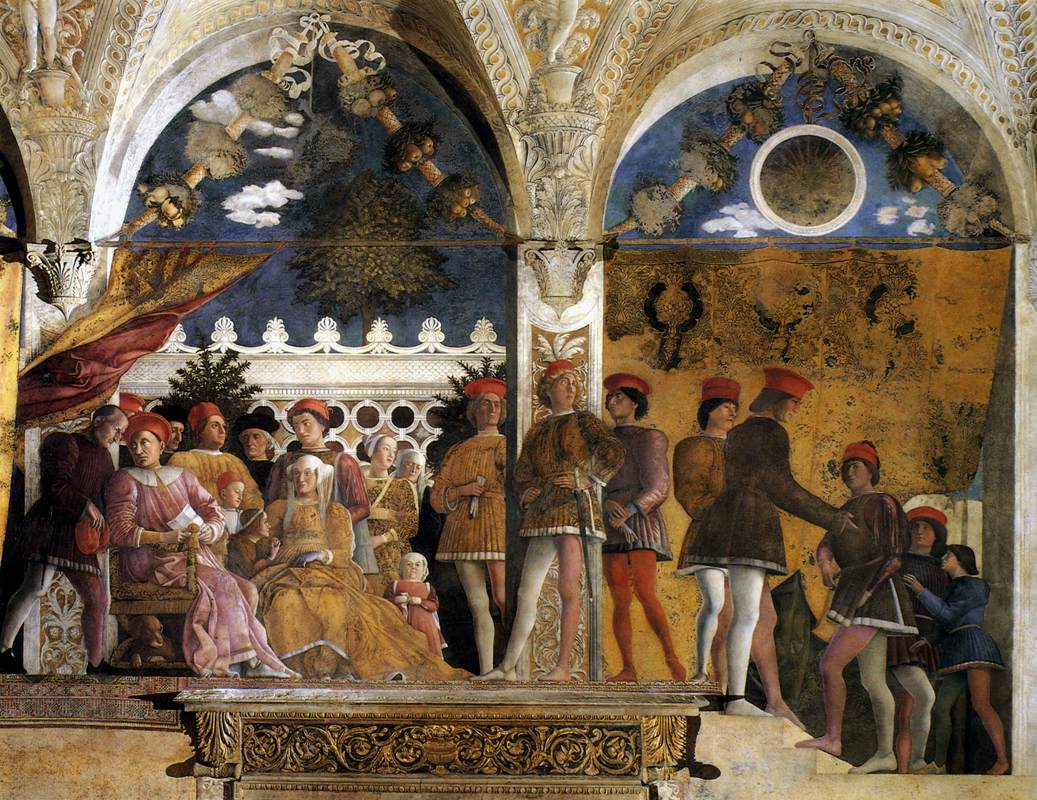
Schir, ye have mony servitouris and officiaris of dyvers curis.. An idealized depiction of a princely court in a fresco of Andrea Mantegna

Remonstrance to the King is a Scots poem of William Dunbar (born 1459 or 1460) composed in the early sixteenth century. The Remonstrance is one of Dunbar's many appeals to his patron James IV of Scotland asking for personal advancement. In this particular case, the unseemly personal pleading is combined with more dignified subject matter; lavish praise and pointed criticism of the King's court is delivered in an open manner.

The poem is written in simple iambic couplets. The plain metre is however offset by an exceptionally rich vocabulary. Many of the words used are not recorded in any other source and the meaning of several are now lost. Free use of alliteration is also made. The mood varies greatly from earnest advice through comedy to bitter anger. It seems to genuinely reflect Dunbar's feelings and opinions. Due to its vivid description of the court of James IV, the work serves as a useful historical document. Many of the details recorded can be confirmed by other sources.

The text of Remonstrance To The King is preserved in the Maitland Folio Manuscript.

== Synopsis ==
Dunbar addresses the King. He states that his monarch has Many servants and officers of diverse skill who are pleasing, honourable and profitable. He then lists these useful people at length. Scholars, soldiers, craftsmen and entertainers are named. Dunbar restates that they are all deserving of patronage.

Schir, ye have mony servitouris,
And officiaris of dyvers curis,
Kirkmen, courtmen, and craftismen fyne,
Doctouris in jure and medicyne,
Divinouris, rethoris, and philosophouris,
Astrologis, artistis, and oratouris,
Men of armes and vailyeand knychtis,
And mony uther gudlie wichtis,
Musicianis, menstralis, and mirrie singaris,
Chevalouris, cawandaris, and flingaris,
Cunyouris, carvouris, and carpentaris,
Beildaris of barkis and ballingaris,
Masounis lyand upon the land,
And schipwrichtis hewand upone the strand,
Glasing wrichtis, goldsmythis, and lapidaris,
Pryntouris, payntouris, and potingaris,
And all of thair craft cunning,
And all at anis lawboring,
Quhilk pleisand ar and honorable,
And to your hienes profitable,
And richt convenient for to be,
With your hie regale majestie,
Deservand of your grace most ding,
Bayth thank, rewarde, and cherissing.

Dunbar then, with fitting modesty, suggests that he might be associated with the people he has just named. His works, which are preserved in the mind and so free from decay, should last as long as the others' work. He adds, nonchalantly, that his rewards are small.

And thocht that I amang the laif,
Unworthy be ane place to have,
Or in thair nummer to be tald,
Als lang in mynd my work sall hald,
Als haill in everie circumstance,
In forme, in mater, and substance,
But wering or consumptioun,
Roust, canker, or corruptioun
As ony of thair werkis all,
Suppois that my rewarde be small.

Dunbar moves on. He claims that, because of the King's grace and meekness, another sort surrounds him. A catalogue of undesirable courtiers then follows. Many of the terms used are obscure.

Bot ye sa gracious ar and meik,
That on your hienes followis eik,
Aneuthir sort more miserabill,
Thocht thai be nocht sa profitable,
Fenyeouris, fleichouris, and flatteraris,
Cryaris, craikaris, and clatteraris,
Soukaris, groukaris, gledaris, gunnaris,
Monsouris of France gud clarat cunnaris,
Inopportoun askaris of Yrland kynd,
And meit revaris lyk out of mynd,
Scaffaris and scamleris in the nuke,
And hall huntaris of draik and duik,
Thrimlaris and thristaris as thai war woid,
Kokenis and kennis na man of gude,
Schulderaris and schovaris that hes no schame,
And to no cunning that can clame,
And can non uthir craft nor curis,
Bot to mak thrang, schir, in your duris,
And rusche in quhair thay counsale heir,
And will at na man nurtir leyr.

Among these hangers-on, special attention is given to alchemists. Dunbar's low opinion of alchemy was expressed forcefully elsewhere in his work.

In quintiscence eik, ingynouris joly,
That far can multiplie in folie,
Fantastik fulis, bayth fals and gredy,
Of toung untrew and hand evill diedie.

Few of the group of unworthy people receive the justice they deserve.

Few dar of all this last additioun,
Cum in Tolbuyth without remissioun.

Dunbar observes that the worthy courtiers are well-rewarded and that no man can object to this.

And thocht this nobill cunning sort,
Quhom of befoir I did report,
Rewardit be, it war bot ressoun,
Thairat suld no man mak enchessoun.

But he complains that those he considers to be unworthy also receive rewards while he does not. He compares them to characters in the contemporary poem Colkelbie Sow and in a bitterly angry outburst declares that his heart almost bursts due to these abuses.

Bot quhen the uther fulis nyce,
That feistit at Cokelbeis gryce,
Ar all rewardit, and nocht I,
Than on this fals warld I cry "Fy!"
My hart neir bristis than for teyne,
Quhilk may nocht suffer nor sustene,
So grit abusioun for to se,
Daylie in court befoir myn ee.

The angry tone continues mixed with some self-pity. He insists that he is enduring penance and, If I was rewarded like the rest, he would be somewhat satisfied; his unhappiness would be lessened and he would overlook many of the faults that he observes.

And yit more panence wald I have,
Had I rewarde amang the laif.
It wald me sumthing satisfie,
And les of my malancolie,
And gar me mony falt ourse,
That now is brayd befoir myn ee.

Dunbar, his mind in flight sees a choice. Either his heart must break or he must take revenge with his pen and send the most deserving into melancholy to die.

My mind so fer is set to flyt,
That of nocht ellis I can endyt.
For owther man my hart to breik,
Or with my pen I man me wreik,
And sen the tane most nedis be,
Into malancolie to de,

He warns that if he does not receive the remedy he will let the venom issue out.

Or lat the vennim ische all out,
Be war anone, for it will spout,
Gif that the tryackill cum nocht tyt,
To swage the swalme of my dispyt!

In these final lines Dunbar seems to threaten to satirise his opponents in his poetry unless his complaints are addressed.

== Historical Context ==
James IV reigned as King of Scots between 1488 and 1513.

William Dunbar was employed at the Scottish Court from 1500 until at least 1513.

The Remonstrance appears to be a largely authentic description of the Kingdom of Scotland during the reign of James IV. Several of Dunbar's observations agree with other sources:

"Carvouris; carpentaris; Masounis lyand upon the land; Glasing wrichtis." James' rule saw an extensive programme of building. Work was conducted at royal castles, royal palaces, religious sites and at new naval bases.

"Beildaris of barkis; schipwrichtis hewand upone the strand." One of James IV's policies was the creation of a Navy.

"Pryntouris." print was introduced to Scotland in 1508.

"Inopportoun askaris of Yrland kynd." Under King James IV, regular payments were made to Irish clerics for reasons which are unclear.

"gledaris, gunnaris" James regularly hunted with hawks and primitive handguns. These hunts may have attracted people of whom Dunbar disapproved.

"In quintiscence eik, ingynouris joly, That far can multiplie in folie." The King sponsored alchemists including John Damian.

"the uther fulis nyce, That feistit at Cokelbeis gryce." Colkelbie Sow is an anonymous Scots poem of the fifteenth century. One of its passages describes a feast based on a gryce or Suckling pig. The feast was attended by a variety of reprobates who are named in a colourful list. A contemporary reader would be likely to see a parallel in Dunbar's own list of undesirable characters who "feasted" at the King's court.
