= Of James Dog =

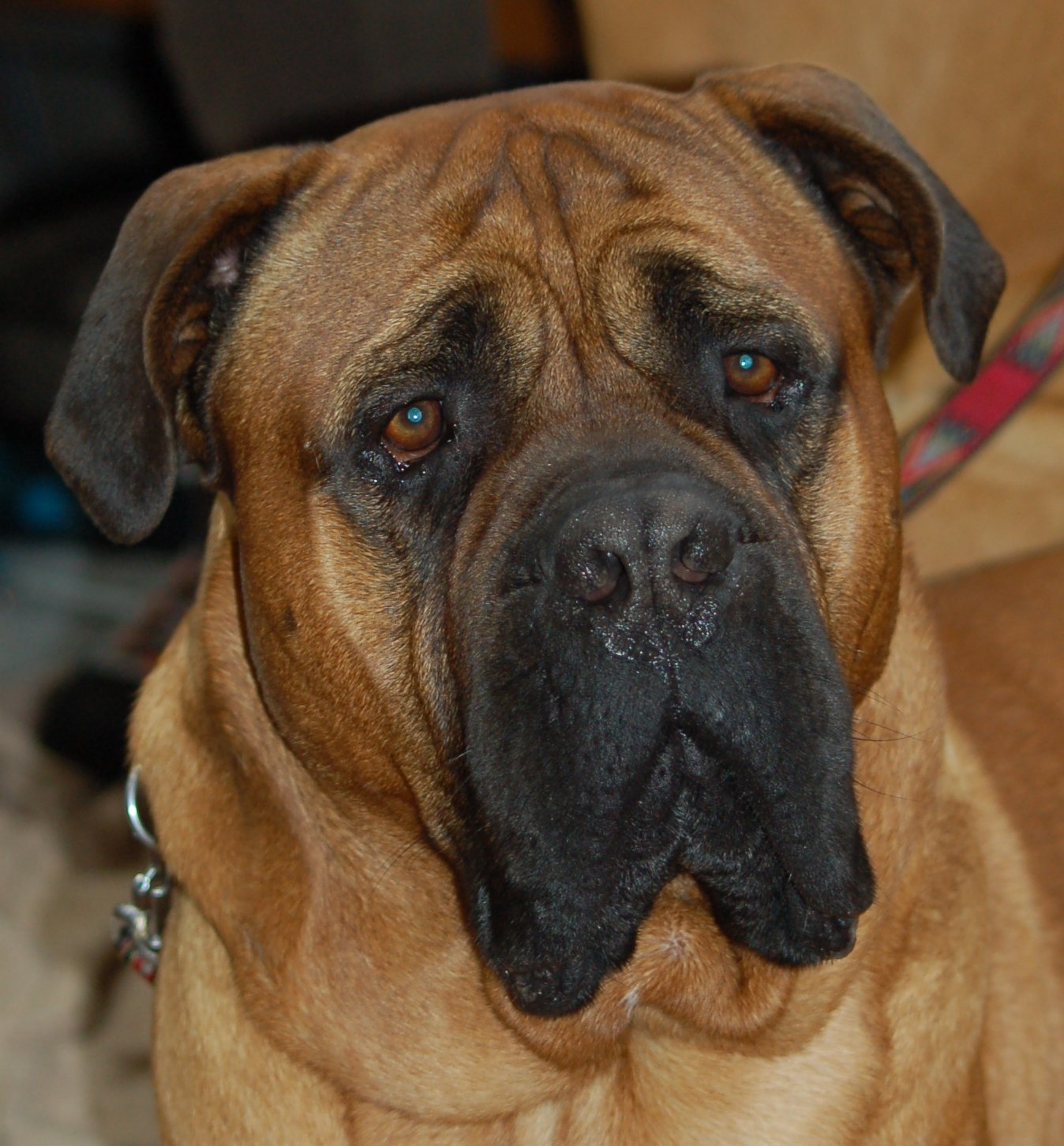
He is owre mekle to be your messan, Madam I red you get a less ane.

Of James Dog or, more fully, Of James Dog, Kepair of the Quenis Wardrop is a poem of William Dunbar in which the poet complains to Queen Margaret Tudor of Scotland about the keeper of her wardrobe, James Dog.

== Summary ==
In the work Dunbar claims to have asked Dog for a doublet which has been given to him by the Queen. He then claims that Dog treated him impolitely while dealing with the request.

Dunbar makes many uses of punning, canine references to Dog's surname. James Dog is depicted as being bad-tempered, uncooperative and self-important.

The text of the poem is found in the Maitland Folio Manuscript where it is entitled "To The Quene" and has the postscript "Quod Dunbar of James Dog Kepair of the Quenis wardrop".

Apparently Dunbar's complaint did not convince the Queen. The poem He Is Na Dog, He Is a Lam seems to represent a half-hearted change of the poet's mind.

== Historical Context ==
Queen Margaret of Scotland was the consort of James IV of Scotland. She was the eldest daughter of Henry VII of England and Elizabeth of York. She had married King James in 1503.

William Dunbar was a poet employed at the Scottish court during the reign of Margaret and James.

The royal "wardrobe" was a store of the Queen's possessions bearing little resemblance to a modern wardrobe. James Dog, or Doig, was a servant at the Scots court, first mentioned in the royal accounts in 1489. He was first employed in the royal kitchens, and was later an usher in the hall. His role in the wardrobe was to manage the store of textiles and clothes and direct the servants who worked there. He was in charge of the cloths of estate and canopies which were hung behind the king's throne. In 1495 he put up tapestries in the king's chamber at Holyrood Palace for the reception of the Chancellor of Denmark. When James IV was at Stirling Castle in April 1497, James Dog supplied him with footballs. He put up hooks in Holyrood Palace in 1503 and bought cords to suspend the bed canopies, for the reception of Margaret Tudor.

Like several other servants in the royal household, James Dog had a variety of skills and considerable influence. He is also known to have travelled and carried Margaret Tudor's letters.

Dog was given lands at Dunrobin in Perthshire in May 1500. His usual annual fee was 6 merks and his clothing allowance was 4.5 ells of rissilis (Lille) black and 2.5 ells of velvet.

He came with Margaret Tudor to London and served her at Baynard's Castle in 1516. He was still alive in 1523, and his son, James Dog younger, was appointed 'Yeoman of the Wardrobe' to James V on 17 September 1524. Margaret sent 'Jame Dokt' or 'Jamy Dog' as a messenger to the Duke of Norfolk at Brandspeth in October 1524, and in February 1525 she sent him to the English ambassador Thomas Magnus to ask for a loan of 300 crowns.

== The Poem ==
Dunbar declares himself to be offended by James Dog's dour response when the poet asked to be issued a doublet gifted to him by the Queen. Dog is accused of treating the matter with the same gravity as when dispensing a far-more-expensive full-length coat. Dunbar warns his mistress "You have a dangerous dog!"

The wardraipper of Venus boure,
To giff a doublett he is als doure,
As it war of ane futt syd frog:
Madame, ye heff a dangerous dog!

He then claims that, when shown the Queen's instructions, Dog "barked as if he was worrying a pig". Dunbar yearns for "the dangerous dog" to be punished with "a heavy stick."

Quhen that I schawe to him your markis,
He turnis to me again and barkis,
As he war wirriand ane hog:
Madame, ye heff a dangerous dog.

Quhen that I schawe to him your wrytin,
He girnis that I am red for bytin,
I wald he had ane havye clog:
Madame, ye heff an dangerous dog.

In spite of the poet's friendly approaches Dog "barks like a common mongrel chasing cattle".

Quhen that I speik till him freindlyk,
He barkis lyk an middling tyk,
War chassand cattell throu a bog,
Madam, ye heff a dangerous dog.

The wardrobe keeper is accused of being "A mighty mastiff" who could defend the Queen's property from even "The Great Sultan Gog Magog".

He is ane mastive, mekle of mycht,
To keip your wardroippe over nycht,
Fra the grytt sowdan Gog Magog:
Madam, ye heff a dangerous dog.

Dunbar closes with the following advice to the Queen: "He is too powerful to be your lapdog. Madam, I urge you to get a smaller one".

He adds, in parting, "His approach makes all your chambers shake. Madam, you have a dangerous dog."

He is ouer mekle to be your messan.
Madam, I red you, get a less an.
His gang garris all your chalmeris schog.
Madam, ye heff a dangerous dog.
