= Treaty of Perpetual Peace =

1502 treaty between England and Scotland

The Treaty of Perpetual Peace was signed by James IV of Scotland and Henry VII of England in 1502. It agreed to end the intermittent warfare between Scotland and England which had been waged over the previous two hundred years. Although it failed in this respect, as hostilities continued intermittently throughout the 16th century, it led to the Union of the Crowns 101 years later.

== Negotiations ==
As part of the treaty, a marriage was agreed upon between James IV and Margaret Tudor, the daughter of Henry VII. Andrew Forman and the poet William Dunbar were members of the Scottish embassy who negotiated the treaty in London. Peace between England and Scotland had already been established by the Treaty of Ayton, brokered by Pedro de Ayala in 1497. Apart from the marriage, the treaty sought to outline various rules and processes for administering the English and Scottish borders and prevent local cross-border conflicts from escalating to war. The treaty was signed at Richmond Palace on 24 January 1502 by Robert Blackadder, Archbishop of Glasgow, Patrick Hepburn, Earl of Bothwell and Andrew Forman.

== Ratification ==
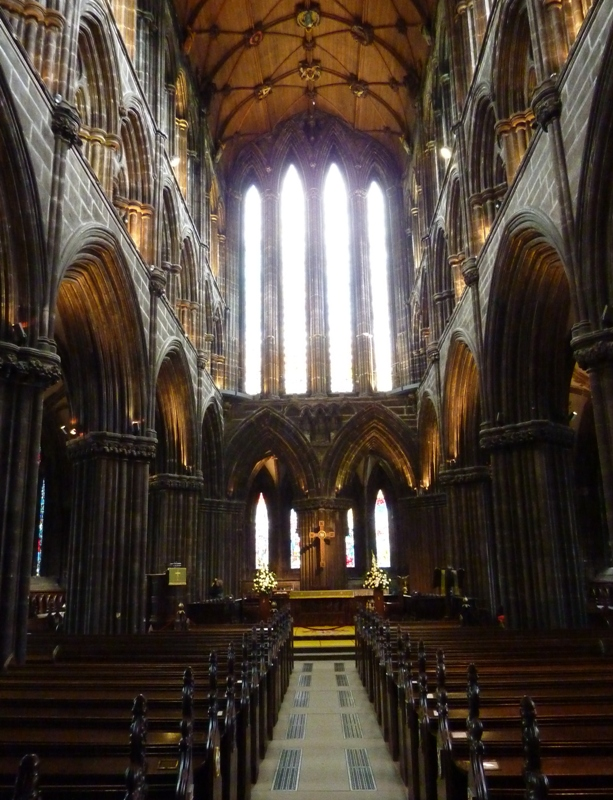
James IV ratified the treaty at the altar of Glasgow Cathedral on 10 December 1502

James IV gave his oath on 10 December 1502 at the right hand of the high altar of Glasgow Cathedral to keep to the terms of the treaty. The ceremony had to be repeated as the word "France" had been accidentally inserted into the text of the King's oath instead of "England". The English witnesses at Glasgow were Sir Thomas Darcy, Captain of Berwick, Sir Richard Hastyng, and Dr. Henry Babington, a professor of theology. The two attempts were recorded by the English cleric John Deyce and the Scottish notary Archibald Layng.

The kings then exchanged illuminated copies of the ratifications. Two of the Scottish manuscripts were painted and gilded by Sir Thomas Galbraith, a clerk of the Chapel Royal in Stirling Castle, who was given 59 shillings for materials and time. A few days later James IV gave Sir Thomas a present of 18 shillings on New Year's Day.

In April 1503, Henry VII sent the Bishops of Hereford and Worcester to Rome for the Pope's ratification. (Adrian Castellesi, Bishop of Hereford, had originally been sent from Italy to make peace between James III of Scotland and his son's supporters.)

== Terms ==
- There be "good, real and sincere, true, sound, and firm peace, friendship, league and confederation, to last all time coming" between England and Scotland;
- Neither king (or their successors) shall make war against the other
- If either king broke the treaty the pope would excommunicate them

== Consequences ==
The treaty was broken in 1513 when James declared war on England in support of the French who had lately been attacked by the English. James was acting according to Scotland's obligations to France under an older mutual defence treaty, the Auld Alliance. James was excommunicated by Pope Leo X and the English Cardinal Bainbridge for breaking his sworn treaty with England. The subsequent invasion by the Scots met defeat when James was killed on 9 September 1513 at the Battle of Flodden in Northumberland.

Despite this abrogation, the Treaty of Perpetual Peace had a long-lasting effect because of the marriage between James Stewart and Margaret Tudor: their great-grandson King James VI of Scotland was able to succeed to the English throne in 1603 at the Union of the Crowns.

== See also ==
- List of treaties

== Sources ==
- Bain, Joseph, ed., Calendar of Documents relating to Scotland, 1357-1509, vol. 4, HM Register House, Edinburgh (1888)
- Rymer, Thomas, ed., Foedera, vol. 12, (1740) p. 793, 797, Text of treaty etc., standard edition.
- Rymer, Thomas, ed, Foedera, conventiones, literae,... inter Reges Angliae et alios, vol. 5 part 1 & 2, Johannes Neaulm, Hague, (1741); (Latin) relevant material as in vol. 12 in English editions; part 2, pp. 182-202, includes the Glasgow Cathedral oath in English, part 2, p. 182
