= In Honour of the City of London =

In Honour of the City of London is a 1937 cantata by William Walton for mixed chorus and orchestra. The text is by the 15th–16th-century poet William Dunbar. It was written for the Leeds Triennial Festival for which Walton had composed Belshazzar's Feast in 1931, but it failed to gain the popularity of the earlier work and is comparatively infrequently performed.

== Background, premiere and later performances ==
To mark the coronation of George V in 1937 the organisers of the Leeds Triennial Festival commissioned a new choral work from Walton, whose cantata Belshazzar's Feast had been an immediate and lasting success when premiered at the 1931 festival. Unlike its predecessor, which has a prominent part for solo baritone, the new work was for chorus and orchestra only.

Walton set words by the Scottish poet William Dunbar, who wrote here not in Gaelic but in English of a broadly Chaucerian character. Walton retained the text in its original form and did not modernise the spelling. There are six verses, of which the first is:

London, thou art of townes A per se.
Soveraign of cities, semeliest in sight,
Of high renoun, riches, and royaltie;
Of lordis, barons, and many goodly knyght;
Of most delectable lusty ladies bright;
Of famous prelatis in habitis clericall;
Of merchauntis full of substaunce and myght:
London, thou art the flour of Cities all.

The poem had already been set by George Dyson in 1928, a cantata that was popular with choral societies. Eschewing Dyson's "fresh melodic sweetness and restraint" (according to Walton's biographer Neil Tierney), Walton wanted to compose "virile and compelling" music. The Festival chorus and orchestra coped well with the difficult score, and there were no reports of rebellion by the singers as there had been before Belshazzar's Feast in 1931. The premiere of the new work was given at Leeds Town Hall on 6 October 1937, by the Leeds Festival Chorus and the London Philharmonic Orchestra conducted by Malcolm Sargent. The composer conducted the first London performance, given at the Queen's Hall on 1 December 1937 by the BBC Choral Society and BBC Symphony Orchestra.

The piece was well received, but was not widely taken up by other performers. It was given at the Proms in 1947; since when it has (at 2021) been given in major London venues eight times. (Note: At a Festival of Britain season concert at the Royal Festival Hall in 1951; at the Royal Academy of Music and at St Paul's Cathedral in the City of London Festival, both in 1962; at the Festival Hall in 1974, at the Barbican Hall in 1982 and 1984; at the Festival Hall in 1992; the Barbican in 2002;)

== Structure ==
The orchestral parts are scored for two flutes, two oboes, two clarinets, two bassoons, four horns, three trumpets, three trombones, tuba, timpani, two percussionists (side drum, bass drum, cymbals, tambourine, glockenspiel, triangle and tubular bells), two harps, and strings. The chorus is in four parts, expanded in certain sections to eight.

Each of the six verses is in a different rhythm. The work begins with chordal cries of "London", followed by a brisk rising figure on the violins. The second verse is marked "con agilità e molto ritmico" (with agility and very rhythmically). The third verse, still energetic, contains much homophonic singing. The fourth verse, in 4/2, which is concerned with the Thames, is gentler; the women's voices sing long melodic lines and the men enter only for the last two lines; the verse ends in unaccompanied eight-part harmony. A brisk orchestral passage introduces a lively verse about London Bridge and the Tower, in which the men's voices are featured, first the basses and then the tenors. The last stanza, "Strong be thy walls", has what Tierney calls "a Belshazzar-like grandeur", ending with the jubilant ringing of bells.

== Critical reception ==
Contemporary press reviews were favourable, but later critics, including Frank Howes, Michael Kennedy and Tierney have been only moderately enthusiastic. Howes finds the music "too strenuous for the character of the poem, which calls for something more spacious if no less exuberant". For Kennedy, the piece is "short, laboured and somewhat hectic", and on the whole inferior to Dyson's setting. Tierney also finds the piece laboured and strenuous, though providing "a glowingly colourful" example of Walton's skill in writing celebratory pieces.

== Notes, references and sources ==
=== Sources ===
- Howes, Frank (1973). The Music of William Walton (second ed.). London: Oxford University Press. ISBN 978-0-19-315431-5.
- Kennedy, Michael (1989). Portrait of Walton. Oxford: Oxford University Press. ISBN 978-0-19-816705-1.
- Tierney, Neil (1984). William Walton: His Life and Music. London: Robert Hale. ISBN 978-0-70-901784-4.
