= On His Heid-Ake =

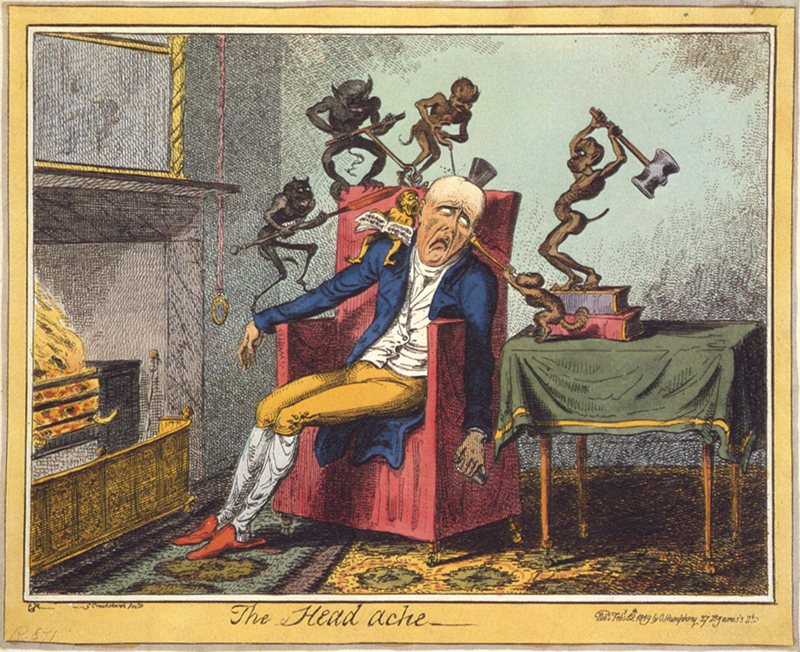
So sair the magryme dois me menyie, Perseing my brow as ony ganyie. A nineteenth-century depiction of a headache by George Cruikshank

On His Heid-Ake, also referred to as The Headache and My Heid Did Yak Yesternicht, is a brief poem in Scots by William Dunbar (born 1459 or 1460) composed at an unknown date.

The poem describes Dunbar's experience of a severe headache which he refers to as a "magryme". The symptoms described, such as pain, depression and photophobia are consistent with the modern diagnosis of migraine. The work consists of three short stanzas and is preserved in the Reidpeth Manuscript of the seventeenth century, now held by Cambridge University Library.

== Summary ==
William Dunbar was a poet employed at the court of King James IV of Scotland.

His poetry often adopted the traditional themes of court poets, such as religious subjects, satire and the marking of great events.

However On His Heid-Ake deals with the commonplace details of his private life.

The poem might be interpreted as an apology to his patron for failing to make progress in the composition of poetry.

== The Poem ==
Dunbar declares that he has recently suffered a headache which has prevented him from composing poetry. He compares the pain to being pierced by an arrow and adds that he finds it difficult to look at sources of light.

My heid did yak yester nicht,
This day to mak that I na micht.
So sair the magryme dois me menyie,
Perseing my brow as ony ganyie,
That scant I luik may on the licht.

He records that his attempts at writing were thwarted by his discomfort.

And now schir laitlie eftir mes,
To dyt thocht I begowthe to dres,
The sentence lay full evill till find,
Unsleipit in my heid behind,
Dullit in dulnes and distres.

He is unable to take pleasure in entertainments while affected by the migraine.

Full oft at morrow I upryse,
Quhen that my curage sleipeing lyis,
For mirth, for menstrallie and play,
For din nor danceing nor deray,
It will not walkin me no wise.
