= The Thrissil and the Rois =

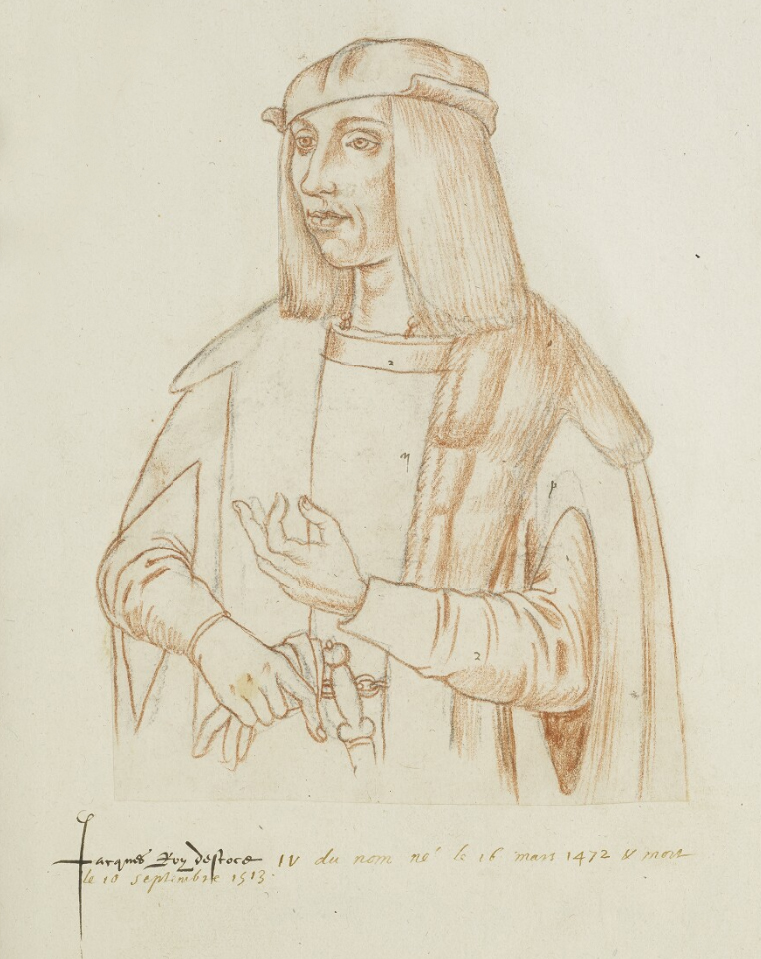
James IV sketched by Jacques Le Boucq. Middle sixteenth century.

The Thrissil and the Rois is a Scots poem composed by William Dunbar to mark the wedding, in August 1503, of King James IV of Scotland to Princess Margaret Tudor of England.

The poem takes the form of a dream vision in which Margaret is represented by a rose and James is represented variously by a lion, an eagle and a thistle. The episodes of the poem present in allegory King James' view of himself and of his kingdom. Princess Margaret receives lavish praise for her beauty, virtue and high birth.

The text of the poem is found only in the Bannatyne Manuscript. It is also known as The Thistle and the Rose.

== Historical Context ==
The marriage of James IV, King of Scots, and Margaret Tudor, the eldest daughter of Henry VII of England had been agreed in the Treaty of Perpetual Peace of 1502. This treaty was intended to effect a reconciliation between the kingdoms of Scotland and England which had been at war intermittently since 1296. The treaty would not be successful in establishing peace. Ten years after the marriage of James and Margaret Scotland and England aligned themselves with opposing alliances in the War of the League of Cambrai. The subsequent campaign ended with James' death in the Scots' defeat at Flodden.

The author, William Dunbar, was a prolific poet who had been employed at the Scots royal court since at least 1500. His work often recorded state events.

The thistle had first appeared in Scottish iconography on the coins of King James III. His son and successor James IV continued its use as a symbol of the Scottish monarchy.

A rose, coloured red and white, had been adopted as a dynastic symbol by Henry VII who had seized the throne of England in 1485. It represented a union of the Lancastrian and Yorkist factions of the Plantagenet dynasty which had fought a series of civil wars for the control of the English throne before being succeeded by Henry. A red rose was a badge of the Lancastrians; A white rose was a badge of the Yorkists.

== The Poem ==
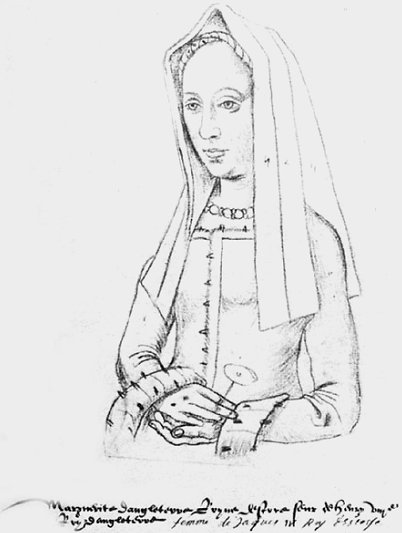
Princess Margaret of England sketched by an unknown artist. "Recueil d'Arras", sixteenth century.

The Thrissil and the Rois is composed in rhyme royal stanzas and makes free use of aureate vocabulary inspired by Latin and French. The narrative is presented in the common medieval device of a dream vision.

=== The Introduction ===
Dunbar begins with a description of Spring.

Quhen Merche wes with variand windis past,
And Appryll had with hir silver schouris
Tane leif at Nature with ane orient blast,
And lusty May, that muddir is of flouris,
Had maid the birdis to begyn thair houris,
Amang the tendir odouris reid and quhyt,
Quhois armony to heir it wes delyt,

The sleeping poet has a dream in which he is visited by the personification of May.

Me thocht fresche May befoir my bed upstude
In weid depaynt of mony divers hew,
Sobir, benyng, and full of mansuetude,
In brycht atteir of flouris forgit new,
Hevinly of color, quhyt, reid, broun, and blew,
Balmit in dew and gilt with Phebus bemys
Quhill all the hous illumynit of hir lemys.

She demands that he rises and compose a poem in her honour.

"Slugird," scho said, "Awalk annone, for schame,
And in my honour sumthing thow go wryt,

The poet complains that he can't meet her request. He claims to have had no inspiration recently.

Quhairto quod I, Sall I uprys at morrow,
For in this May few birdis herd I sing?
Thai haif moir caus to weip and plane thair sorrow,
Thy air it is nocht holsum nor benyng,

Patiently, May reminds him that he had previously promised her to write a poem about 'the most pleasant rose'.

With that this lady sobirly did smyll
And said, Uprys and do thy observance,
Thow did promyt in Mayis lusty quhyle
For to discryve the ros of most plesance.

May then departs into a beautiful garden and, dressed hurriedly, the poet follows her.

Quhen this wes said depairtit scho, this quene,
And enterit in a lusty gairding gent.
And than, me thocht, sa listely besene,
In serk and mantill, full haistely I went,
Into this garth, most dulce and redolent,
Of herb and flour and tendir plantis sueit,
And grene levis doing of dew doun fleit.

=== Dame Nature ===
In the garden Dame Nature is holding court attended by other mythological characters.

The birdis did with oppin vocis cry,
O luvaris fo, away thow dully nycht,
And welcum day that confortis every wicht.
Haill May, haill Flora, haill Aurora schene,
Haill princes Natur, haill Venus luvis quene.

Dame Nature sends messengers to assemble all the animals, birds and plants of the world.

Scho ordand eik that every bird and beist,
Befoir hir hienes suld annone compeir,
And every flour of vertew, most and leist,
And every herb be feild, fer and neir,

The assembly gathers quickly.

All present wer in twynkling of ane e,
Baith beist and bird and flour, befoir the quene.

=== The Lion ===
Dame Nature calls the Lion forward. He is described as resembling the Lion Rampant standard of the Scots Kings.

Reid of his cullour as is the ruby glance,
On feild of gold he stude full mychtely,
With flour delycis sirculit lustely.

Dame Nature crowns the lion as King of the animals and instructs him to exercise justice wisely.

This lady liftit up his cluvis cleir,
And leit him listly lene upone hir kne,
And crownit him with dyademe full deir,
Of radyous stonis most ryall for to se,
Saying, The king of beistis mak I thee,
And the chief protector in the woddis and schawis.
Onto thi leigis go furth, and keip the lawis.

Exerce justice with mercy and conscience,
And lat no small beist suffir skaith na skornis
Of greit beistis that bene of moir piscence.

The lion seems to symbolise the duty of the King of Scots to bring justice to his subjects both humble and powerful.

The animals acclaim their new King.

All kynd of beistis into thair degré
At onis cryit lawd, Vive le roy!
And till his feit fell with humilité,
And all thay maid him homege and fewté,

=== The Eagle ===
Dame Nature then crowns the Eagle as King of the birds and sharpens his feathers 'like steel darts'. He is commanded to let 'no ravening bird cause trouble'.

Syne crownit scho the Egle, king of fowlis,
And as steill dertis scherpit scho his pennis,
And bawd him be als just to awppis and owlis
As unto pacokkis, papingais, or crennis,
And mak a law for wycht fowlis and for wrennis,
And lat no fowll of ravyne do efferay,
Nor devoir birdis bot his awin pray.

The Eagle appears to symbolise the King's determination to keep the peace within Scotland and, perhaps, to keep the peace with England.

=== The Thistle ===
Dame Nature then inspects the plants and judges the spiked thistle to be 'able for war'. The thistle is crowned King of the plants with a 'radiant crown of rubys'.

Upone the awfull Thrissill scho beheld
And saw him kepit with a busche of speiris.
Concedring him so able for the weiris,
A radius croun of rubeis scho him gaif.

The thistle is commanded to 'go into the field and defend the others.'

And said, In feild go furth and fend the laif.

The thistle seems to represent the King's determination to defend his Kingdom.

Dame Nature then advises the Thistle to show discretion when judging other plants.

And sen thow art a king, thow be discreit,
Herb without vertew hald nocht of sic pryce
As herb of vertew and of odor sueit,
And lat no nettill vyle and full of vyce
Hir fallow to the gudly flour delyce,
Nor latt no wyld weid full of churlichenes
Compair hir till the lilleis nobilnes,

This passage appears to be a diplomatically worded appeal to the King to abandon his mistresses after his marriage.

Nature recommends the red-and-white rose to him above all other flowers.

Nor hald non udir flour in sic denty
As the fresche Ros of cullour reid and quhyt,
For gife thow dois, hurt is thyne honesty,
Conciddering that no flour is so perfyt,
So full of vertew, plesans, and delyt,
So full of blisfull angelik bewty,
Imperiall birth, honour, and dignité.

The rose clearly represents Margaret of England.

=== The Rose ===
Dame Nature then addresses the rose and, after praising her lavishly, asks her to approach and be crowned.

Than to the Ros scho turnyt hir visage
And said, O lusty dochtir most benyng,
Aboif the lilly illustare of lynnage,
Fro the stok ryell rysing fresche and ying,
But ony spot or macull doing spring,
Cum, blowme of joy, with jemis to be cround,
For our the laif thy bewty is renownd.

A coistly croun with clarefeid stonis brycht,
This cumly quene did on hir heid inclois,

The new Queen is acclaimed.

Quhairfoir me thocht all flouris did rejos,
Crying attonis, Haill be thow richest Ros,
Haill hairbis empryce, haill freschest quene of flouris!
To thee be glory and honour at all houris!

The birds join the acclamation of the new Queen who is compared to a pearl. The name 'Margaret' is derived from the Latin term for a pearl, 'margarita'.

The commoun voce uprais of birdis small
Apone this wys, O blissit be the hour,
That thow wes chosin to be our principall,
Welcome to be our princes of honour,
Our perle, our plesans, and our paramour,
Our peax, our play, our plane felicité:
Chryst thee conserf frome all adversité!

The birds' song merges with the dawn chorus which then wakes Dunbar. He looks around for the garden he saw in his dream but finds it gone. While 'half-frightened', he starts to write the poem.

Than all the birdis song with sic a schout,
That I annone awoilk quhair that I lay,
And with a braid I turnyt me about,
To se this court, bot all wer went away.
Than up I lenyt, halflingis in affrey,
And thus I wret, as ye haif hard to forrow,
Of lusty May upone the nynt morrow.

It is the ninth of May.
