= Chepman and Myllar Press =

First printing press established in Scotland

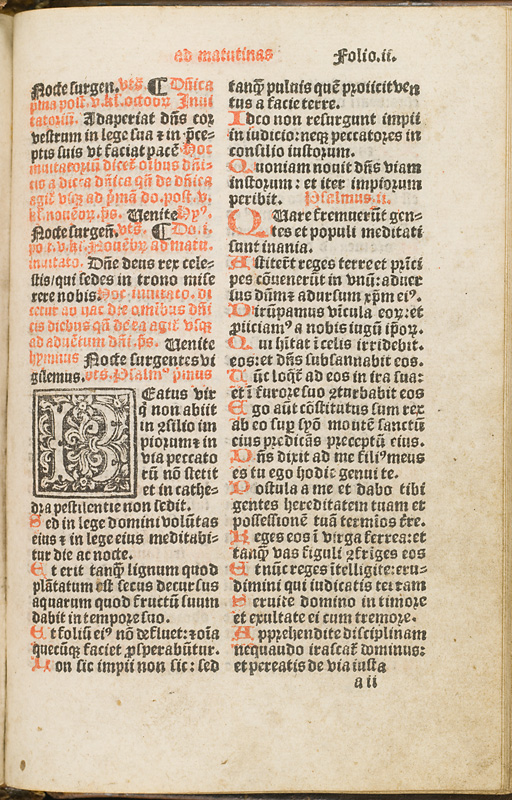
A page from the psalter of the Aberdeen Breviary. (National Library of Scotland).

The Chepman and Myllar Press was the first printing press to be established in Scotland.

The press was founded in 1508 in Edinburgh by Walter Chepman and Androw Myllar, both burgesses of the Scottish capital. The two partners operated under a charter of King James IV issued in 1507 which gave them a monopoly in printed books within Scotland.

Very few products of the press are preserved today. Those that have survived largely intact are nine chapbooks of vernacular literature known collectively as The Chepman and Myllar Prints and a Latin religious text known as The Aberdeen Breviary. Fragments of two other publications also exist. These were editions of The Wallace and The Buke of the Howlat.

The press seems to have had a brief existence. The earliest surviving example of its work dates to 1508 and the latest to 1510.

Chepman and Myllar's press is also referred to as The Southgait Press.

== Historical context ==
Johannes Gutenberg developed printing with moveable type in Germany in the decade after 1440. The new technology spread rapidly.

Scots began to commission the printing of books in other countries. France, with its strong diplomatic and intellectual connection to Scotland, was favoured.

== Foundation by Royal Charter ==
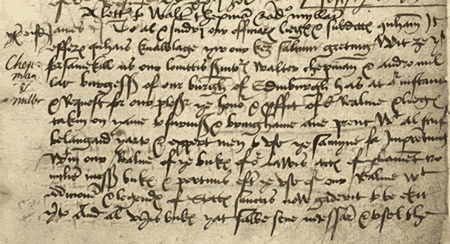
The entry in the Register of The Privy Seal of Scotland, 15 September 1507, which established the press. (National Archives of Scotland).

King James IV authorised the creation of a press in a proclamation of 15 September 1507. He charged his "beloved servants" Chepman and Myllar to "acquire and bring home a press with all accessories and skilled men required to use it".

Wit ye that forsamekill as our lovittis servitouris Walter Chepman and Andro Myllar burgessis of our burgh of Edinburgh, has at our instance and request, for our plesour, the honour and proffit of our Realme and Liegis, takin on thame to furnis and bring hame ane prent, with all stuff belangand tharto, and expert men to use the samyne,

The King intended the press to publish books of laws, acts of parliament, histories and religious texts.

for imprenting within our Realme of the bukis of our Lawis, actis of parliament, croniclis, mess bukis, and portuus efter the use of our Realme, with addiciouns and legendis of Scottis sanctis, now gaderit to be ekit tharto, and al utheris bukis that salbe sene necessar,

The King would determine "competitive prices" for the books.

and to sel the sammyn for competent pricis, be our avis and discrecioun thair labouris and expens being considerit.

Chepman and Myllar were awarded a monopoly in print within Scotland. The commissioning of imported printed books would be prohibited.

And because we understand that this can not be perfurnist without Rycht greit cost labour and expens, we have grantit and promittit to thame that thai sal nocht be hurt nor prevenit thairin be ony utheris to tak copyis of ony bukis furtht of our Realme, to ger imprent the samye in utheris cuntreis, to be brocht and sauld agane within our Realme, to cause the said Walter and Androu tyne thair gret labour and expens,

The charter then specifies a key purpose for the press: the production of liturgical books with a distinctive Scottish character. These were intended to replace the service books of the English Use of Salisbury which was the rite commonly used throughout Scotland at the time. Eventually the importation of books of the English rite would be outlawed.

And als it is divisit and thocht expedient be us and our counsall, that in tyme cuming mess bukis, manualis, matyne bukis and portuus bukis efter our awin Scottis use, and with legendis of Scottis sanctis, as is now gaderit and ekit be ane Reverend fader in God, and our traist counsalour Williame bischope of abirdene and utheris, be usit generaly within al our Realme alssone as the sammyn may be imprentit and providit, and that na maner of sic bukis of Salusbery use be brocht to be sauld within our Realme in tym cuming; and gif ony dois in the contrare, that thai sal tyne the sammyne.

The Aberdeen Breviary, compiled by the King's "traist counsalar" Bishop William Elphinstone of Aberdeen, is apparently an example of this policy.

== Career of the Press ==
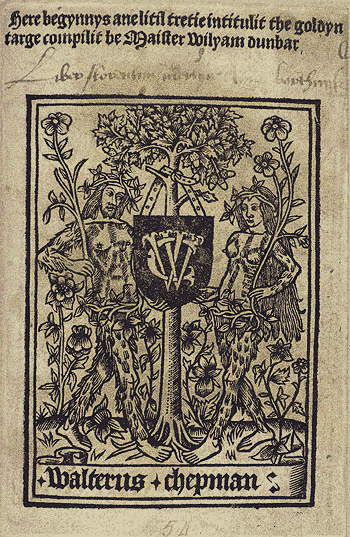
The device of Walter Chepman from the chapbook of 'The Goldyn Targe' in the 'Chepman and Myllar prints'. (National Library of Scotland).

Androw Myllar was a bookseller who had supplied volumes to the King. He had also published books, printed at Rouen in 1505 and 1506. As such, he can be assumed to have had some knowledge of printing technology.

Walter Chepman was a prosperous textile merchant who had supplied goods to the Crown and also carried out clerical duties at the Royal Court. It might be supposed that he provided the bulk of the capital for the enterprise.

It is not known where or when Chepman and Myllar acquired their printing press and staff, but in the months following the Royal charter, they established themselves in the Southgait of Edinburgh, now known as The Cowgate. Their earliest surviving publication dates to 4 April 1508.

It not known when the press closed, but the latest surviving copies of the Aberdeen Breviary date to 1510.

== Surviving Publications of the Press ==
=== The Chepman and Myllar Prints ===
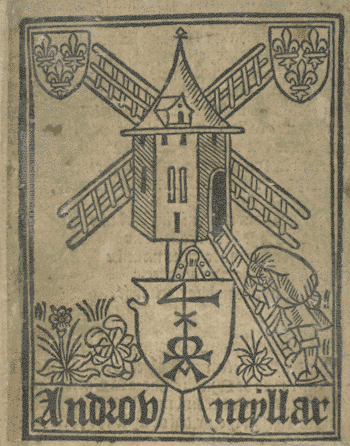
The device of Androw Myllar from the chapbook of 'The Porteous of Nobleness' in the 'Chepman and Myllar prints'. The windmill is apparently a pun on his surname. (National Library of Scotland).

The Chepman and Myllar Prints are nine of Chepman and Myllar's chapbooks bound into a single volume alongside two other pamphlets from Scotland in the sixteenth century. This volume was acquired by the Advocates' Library of Edinburgh and is now held in the National Library of Scotland.

The volume contains the following texts of Chepman and Myllar's press, all written in vernacular, either Scots or English.

Book 1
- "The Porteous of Nobleness". An anonymous Scots translation of Alain Chartier's "Breviaire des Nobles". A guide to courtly manners.

Book 2
- "Golagrus and Gawain". An anonymous chivalric romance.
- "Rhyme Without Accord". A work of John Lydgate's.

Book 3
- Eglamour. An anonymous chivalric romance.
- "Balade". A fragment of an anonymous ballad.

Book 4
- Dunbar's "The Golden Targe" An allegory of love.

Book 5
- '"De regimine principum bonum consilium" or "Ane Buke of Gude Counsale to the King". A commentary on statecraft.

Book 6
- Lydgate's The Complaint of the Black Knight.
- "When by Divine Deliberation". A short religious poem.

Book 7
- The Flyting of Dunbar and Kennedy.
- Henryson's "The Praise of Age".
- "Device, Prowess and eke Humility." A fragmentary anonymous poem.

Book 8
- Henryson's Orpheus and Eurydice.
- "The Want of Wise Men." A short anonymous moral piece.

Book 9
- Dunbar's "The Ballade of Lord Bernard Stewart".

The same volume contains two other Scottish booklets from the Sixteenth Century.

Book 10
- Dunbar's The Tua Mariit Wemen and the Wedo, Lament for the Makaris and "The Testament of Mr Andro Kennedy".
- "Kynd Kittok". Erroneously ascribed to Dunbar.

Book 11
- "A Gest of Robin Hood". A ballad of Robin Hood.

The prints have a page height of approximately 15 cm and include the woodcut devices of Myllar and Chepman.

The National Library of Scotland speculates that these chapbooks may have been test-pieces for the press. Their sale would also have provided a source of income for the new enterprise.

=== The Aberdeen Breviary ===
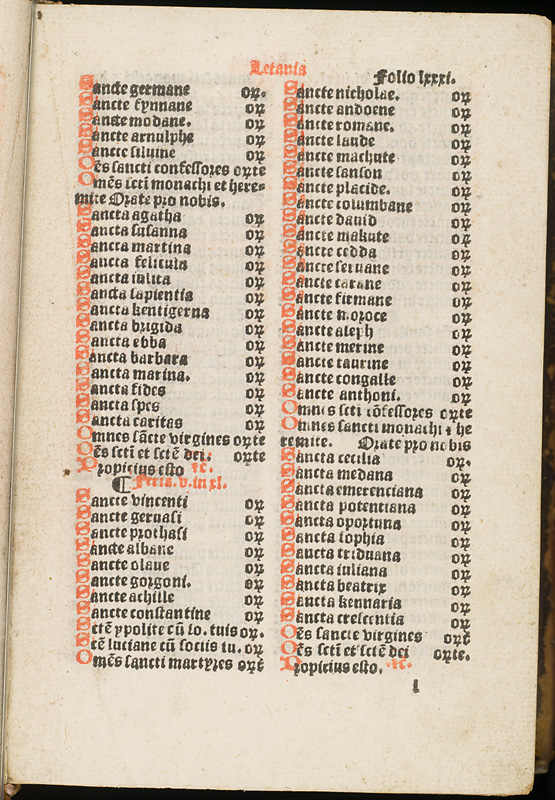
A litany of saints from the Aberdeen Breviary. Scottish Saints are prominent including, Kentigern, Ebba and Triduana. (Edinburgh University Library).

The Aberdeen Breviary or "Brevarium Aberdonense" is the largest surviving product of Chepman and Myllar's press.

Produced between 1509 and 1510, it is a substantial Latin text consisting of two volumes printed in black and red.

Breviaries are handbooks intended to guide priests in conducting Catholic religious ceremonies. They include a psalter and prayers to mark particular festivals and saints' days. The content of breviaries varied across Catholic Europe, with the English Salisbury or Sarum Rite dominant throughout the British Isles.

The Breviary was compiled by Bishop William Elphinstone of Aberdeen and aimed to give the rituals of the Scottish Church a character distinctive from that in England and its dependencies. More than seventy of the saints honoured by it are identified with Scotland. As such, it forms part of the policy set out in the charter which established the press;

that in tyme cuming mess bukis, manualis, matyne bukis and portuus bukis efter our awin Scottis use, and with legendis of Scottis sanctis, be usit generaly within al our Realme alssone as the sammyn may be imprentit and providit.

Copies of the Aberdeen Breviary survive, in varying degrees of completeness, at Edinburgh University, Aberdeen University, The National Library of Scotland, The British Library and a private collection.

=== Fragments ===
Fragmentary remains of two further publications survive whose typeface matches that of the Chepman and Myllar press.

These were Blind Harry's The Wallace and Holland's The Buke of the Howlat.

The fragments of The Wallace are preserved at Glasgow's Mitchell Library and Cambridge University Library. The fragment of The Howlat is kept at Cambridge.

== See also ==
- Global spread of the printing press
