= The Flyting of Dunbar and Kennedie =

The Flyting of Dunbar and Kennedie is the earliest surviving example of the Scottish version of the flyting genre in poetry. The genre takes the form of a contest, or "war of words", between two poets, each trying to outclass the other in vituperation and verbal pyrotechnics. It is not certain how the work was composed, but it is likely to have been publicly performed, probably in the style of a poetic joust by the two combatants, William Dunbar and Walter Kennedy, before the court of James IV of Scotland.

The precise date of the event is not certain, but thought to have been around 1500. There are clues in the poem that suggest some of the features that the show must have contained. Each of the combatants had a commissar, both of whom are named in the work and sometimes directly addressed by the performers. These are (respectively) Sir John the Ross for Dunbar and Quentin Shaw for Kennedy, both of whom were actual persons. Shaw (certainly) and Ross (probably) were also poets, and it seems possible that they played some material part in the performance.

Ross, Shaw, and Kennedy are all three named as a group in the closing stanzas of Dunbar's Lament for the Makaris.

== Outline and performance ==
Cuntbitten crawdon Kennedy, coward of kind,
Ill-fared and dried as Danesman on the ratts,
Like as the gledds had on thy gules snout dined,
Mismade monster, each moon out of thy mind,
Renounce, ribald, thy rhyming: thou but roys [raves].
Thy treacher tongue has ta'en a Highland strynd [tone];
A Lowland arse would make a better noise.

— Dunbar to Kennedy, ll. 50–56

In the poem as it survives, there are two exchanges. Dunbar opens with a three-stanza address to his commissar which pours lofty scorn on the poetic pretensions of Kennedy and his commissar, describing what must happen if their self-promotion should move him to reluctantly unleash his own far superior powers; which boast Kennedy answers, also in three stanzas, with a direct, highly personalised address to Dunbar, knocking his claims down to size and commanding him to bide his wheesht. Needless to say, Dunbar does not obey the injunction and a sustained poetic attack follows (25 stanzas) which Kennedy matches with a longer and equally sustained reply thirteen stanzas longer again (38).

In keeping with the genre there is a great show of outrageous verbal dexterity and invention by both combatants. Each makar eventually closes their performance with a showy verbal climax involving doubling and tripling of rhymes and much-intensified alliteration.

Wanfucked foundling that Nature made an yrle [midget],
Both John the Ross and thou shall squeal and skirle
An' ever I hear aught of your making more.

— Kennedy to Dunbar, ll. 38–40

The content of the insults involves a wide range of strategies in mock character assassination, from the low scatological to the high political. Many accusations involve the capital crimes of theft, treason, and heresy, which, at moments (especially if the context was the royal court), add a potentially dangerous sense of political frisson (Kennedy goes so far as to describe the Dunbar coat of arms as being a noose with "Hang Dunbar" written underneath). Both combatants took great relish describing the terrible punishments that would be meted out upon their opponent and the pictures evoked imply the proximity of instruments of execution in the medieval landscape as bleak as that in many images of the time in art.

Most of the insults thrown by Dunbar are returned or matched in kind by Kennedy, which gives the poem a balance in overall structure. The insults are graphic and personal, and were not necessarily arbitrary. Dunbar characterises Kennedy, a Gael and native speaker of Galwegian Gaelic, as "of the Irishry" who speaks a barbarous Highland dialect, as physically hideous and withered like a sort of living memento mori, as poor and hungry, and of committing bestiality with mares. Kennedy, by contrast, tells Dunbar to go over to England if he wants to speak English, suggests that Dunbar was descended from Beelzebub, is a dwarf, and has no control of his bowel movements (to the point of almost sinking a ship on which he was travelling).

Both cast doubt on the other's poetic skill; Kennedy claims to ascend Mount Parnassus to drink of the inspirational waters of the Castalian Spring, Dunbar goes "in Marche or Februere" to a farm pond and drinks the frogspawn. The satire may perhaps give us caricature impressions of the physical appearance and moral vulnerabilities of the two men, even if no actual portraits of either man are known to have survived.

Anthologies often print Dunbar's contribution alone, but the contest was evenly matched; Dunbar may seem stronger on "fireworks", but Kennedy employs greater tonal subtlety.

George Bannatyne, in his manuscript copy, added the postscript Iuge ye now heir quha gat the war.

Though Dunbar uses the standard eight-line ballade stanza for his major attack, his opening stanzas use the variant rhyme scheme ABABBCCB, and it is this variant that Kennedy employs throughout in both of his replies. The lines are pentameter.

== Influence ==
Kennedy and Dunbar's Flyting seems to have been a popular and influential poem and was almost a de rigueur inclusion in Scottish anthologies of verse for the next two centuries. It was one of the earliest works to be printed by Chepman and Myllar after they were granted the King's licence to operate as printers in Edinburgh (1507). The bardic bout seems to have inspired a legacy of similar contests, most famous of which are the flyting between Lyndsay and King James V (c. 1536), and the flyting of Montgomerie and Polwarth (c. 1598).

Commentators of the 19th and 20th centuries tended to be less favourable towards the poem. The makar and critic Tom Scott regarded it as a crude and offensive work unworthy of critical attention.
