= Irish Remonstrance =

Irish Remonstrance may refer to

- Irish Remonstrance of 1317
- Peter Valesius Walsh's Remonstrance of the 1640s
