= William Dunbar =

Scottish court poet (1459/60 ~ 1530)

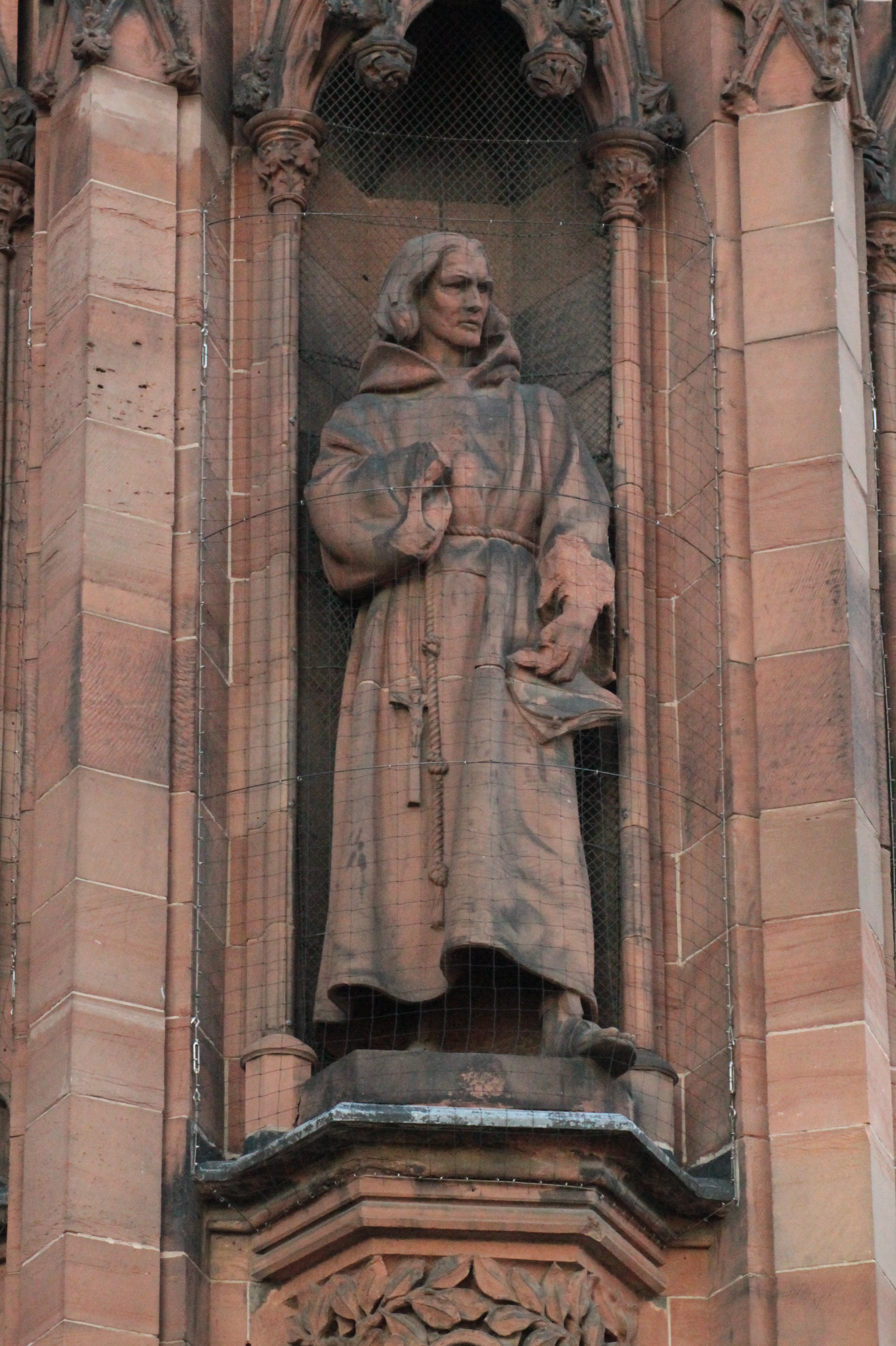
Statue of William Dunbar, Scottish National Portrait Gallery

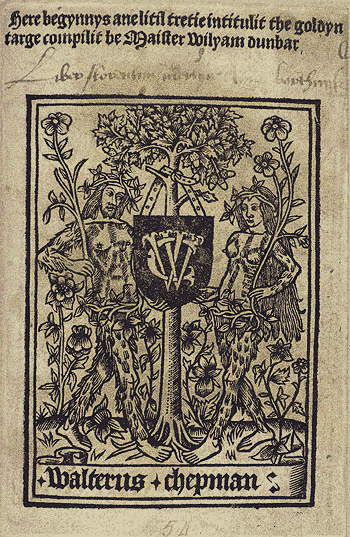
Title page of Dunbar's The Goldyn Targe in the Chepman and Myllar Prints of 1508. (National Library of Scotland).

William Dunbar (1459 or 1460 – by 1530) was a Scottish makar, or court poet, active in the late fifteenth and early sixteenth centuries. He was closely associated with the court of King James IV and produced a large body of work in Scots distinguished by its great variation in themes and literary styles. He was probably a native of East Lothian, as assumed from a satirical reference in The Flyting of Dumbar and Kennedie. His surname is also spelt Dumbar.

== Biography ==
Dunbar first appears in the historical record in 1474 as a new student or determinant of the Faculty of Arts at the University of St Andrews. Since the customary age for entering a Scottish university at this time was fourteen, a birth-date of 1459 or 1460 has been assumed. At St Andrews, he obtained a bachelor's degree in 1477 and a master's degree in 1479. Details from his later life suggest that he was ordained as a priest at some point, but the date is unknown.

In 1491 and 1492, Dunbar accompanied an embassy to Denmark and France in an unknown capacity. In 1501 and 1502, he participated in an embassy to England in the staff of Andrew Forman, Bishop of Moray.

From 1500 the poet was employed at the court of King James in a role for which he received an annual pension. His duties are not recorded; he is referred to only as a servitour or servant; but it is to this period that the bulk of his poetry can be dated. Several of Dunbar's poems were included in the Chepman and Myllar prints of 1508, the first books to be printed in Scotland.

In 1510, his pension was set at the substantial annual sum of eighty pounds Scots. In comparison, Dunbar's contemporary Hector Boece received an annual salary of £26 13s for his role as Principal of King's College, Aberdeen.

The last reliable reference to Dunbar is in the Treasurer's Accounts for May 1513, where he is recorded receiving payment of his pension. James died at Flodden in September of the same year. In the dislocation that followed, the Treasurer's accounts cease for a period and, when resumed in 1515, Dunbar is no longer recorded as being employed by the crown.

A poem, Quhen the Governour Past in France, describing the departure of the Regent Albany for France in 1517, is attributed to Dunbar in the Maitland Manuscripts, suggesting that he was still active at the time. But in Sir David Lyndsay's work The Testament and Complaynt of the Papyngo of 1530, Dunbar is referred to as being deceased. The exact date of his death remains unknown.

== Dunbar's poetry ==
William Dunbar's poetry contained a wide variety of subjects, moods and metres. He wrote many devout religious works and noble courtly pieces but he also produced comic pieces which often made use of scurrilous elements and uninhibited language.

=== Commemorative and occasional works ===
Some of Dunbar's poems were clearly commissioned to mark public events. His allegory The Thrissil and the Rois commemorated the marriage of Margaret of England to King James in 1503, while the Eulogy to Bernard Stewart, Lord of Aubigny welcomed the arrival of a distinguished Franco-Scottish soldier as the French ambassador in 1508. Local events were also marked, such as the visit of Queen Margaret to the 'blyth and blissful burgh of Aberdein' in 1511.

The poem "In Honour of the City of London", of the medieval urban description genre, was made into a cantata of the same name by William Walton in 1937.

=== Religious and moral works ===
Dunbar was an ordained priest of the Roman Catholic Church in Scotland and several of his works have religious subject matter. Rorate Celi Desuper, Of the Passioun of Christ and Done is a Battell on the Dragon Blak deal with the Nativity, Passion and Resurrection respectively. Ane Ballat of Our Lady is a hymn in praise of the Blessed Virgin. The Table of Confession discusses sin and confession.

Poems with a secular moral theme also occur in his work such as Of Deming and the trilogy of short pieces Of Discretioun in Asking, Of Discretioun in Geving and Of Discretioun in Taking.

Dunbar's poems The Tabill Of Confessioun, Rorate Celi Desuper and Done Is A Battell On The Dragon Blak were included in the "Ballatis of Theologie" section of the Bannatyne Manuscript.

=== Court entertainment ===
Many of the poet's pieces appear to provide entertainment for the King, the Queen and his fellow courtiers with comic elements as a recurring theme. The well known Ane Dance in the Quenis Chalmer is a comic satire of court life. The notorious flyting with Kennedy was an exchange of outrageous poetic insults with his fellow makar Walter Kennedy while The Dance of the Seven Deadly Sins is a series of comic scenes set in Hell.

Poems in the tradition of courtly love are represented in Dunbar's work including a short lyric Sweit Rois of Vertew and the extended allegory The Goldyn Targe.

Other court entertainments were more personal. Of James Dog and its sequel He Is Na Dog, He Is a Lam describe the poet's dealings with the keeper of the Queen's wardrobe.

=== Satires and commentary on public life ===
A recurring theme in Dunbar's work is satire. He satirised colleagues of whom he disapproved such as in The Fenyeit Freir of Tungland and he urged the burgesses of Edinburgh to show greater civic pride in To the Merchantis of Edinburgh. Tydings Fra The Sessioun criticised corruption in the Court of Session. In The Treatise of Mr. Andro Kennedy, he directs satire at a member of the court of James IV.

Some of Dunbar's satirical poems are preserved in the Bannatyne Manuscript, including The Dregy of Dunbar, The Twa Cummeris, and The Flyting of Dumbar and Kennedie to name a few.

=== Petitions to the King and personal affairs ===
William Dunbar was willing to reveal his personal affairs in his poetry and a number of his works are petitioned to the King asking for personal advancement. He often requested to be appointed to an office in the church, which he refers to as a benefice. A typical example is Quone Mony Benefices Vakit. On other occasions, his requests were more modest. In The Petition of The Gray Horse, Auld Dunbar the poet asked the King for a new suit of clothes to mark Christmas. The poem Schir, Ye Have Mony Servitouris makes clear his comparative value to the king and country.

Elsewhere, Dunbar seemed to reveal other aspects of his private life. His famous Memento mori poem Lament for the Makaris eulogised his fellow Scottish poets who had died. Meditatioun In Wyntir considers ageing and the poet's frustrated ambitions while On His Heid-Ake is apparently an attempt to excuse a lack of productivity by recounting a migraine.

== Work and influence ==
Dunbar's reputation among his immediate successors was considerable. By later criticism, stimulated in some measure by Scott's eulogy that he is "unrivalled by any which Scotland has produced", he has held the highest place among the makars.

One hundred and one poems have been ascribed to Dunbar. Of these at least ninety are generally accepted as his; of the remaining eleven that are attributed to him, it would be hard to say that they should not be considered authentic. Most doubt has clung to his verse tale The Freiris of Berwik, so much so that it seems unlikely that he was the author. The only copy manuscript of this text is in French, and although the style is very close to that of Dunbar's, it is unlikely that he was the author of this anonymous text.

Dunbar's chief allegorical poems are The Goldyn Targe and The Thrissil and the Rois. The motif of the former is the poet's futile endeavour, in a dream, to ward off Dame Beauty's arrows by Reason's "scheld of gold." When wounded and made prisoner, he discovers the true beauty of the lady: when she leaves him, he is handed over to Heaviness. The noise of the ship's guns, as the company sails off, wakes the poet to the real pleasures of a May morning. Dunbar works on the same theme in a shorter poem, known as Beauty and the Prisoner. The Thrissil and the Rois is a prothalamium in honour of King James and Queen Margaret.

The greater part of Dunbar's work is occasional – personal and social satire, complaints, orisons and pieces of a humorous character. His best-known orison, usually remembered as Timor mortis conturbat me which is repeated as the fourth line of each verse, is titled Lament for the Makaris and takes the form of prayer in memory of the medieval Scots poets.

The humorous works show Dunbar at his finest. The best specimen of this work, of which the outstanding characteristics are sheer whimsicality and topsy-turvy humour, is The Ballad of Kynd Kittok. This strain runs throughout many of the occasional poems, and is not wanting in odd passages in Dunbar's contemporaries; and it has the additional interest of showing a direct historical relationship with the work of later Scottish poets, and chiefly with that of Robert Burns. Dunbar's satire often becomes invective. Examples of this type are The Satire on Edinburgh, The General Satire, the Epitaph on Donald Owre, and the powerful vision of The Dance of the Sevin Deidlie Synnis. Two satirical ballads lampoon a colleague at court, the would-be aviator John Damian. In The Flyting of Dunbar and Kennedy, an outstanding specimen of a favourite northern form, analogous to the continental estrif, or tenzone, he and his rival reach a height of scurrility which is certainly without parallel in English literature. This poem has the additional interest of showing the antipathy between the Middle Scots-speakers in the Lothians and the Galwegian Gaelic-speaking population of Carrick, in the south of Ayrshire, where Walter Kennedy was from.

== "Back to Dunbar" ==
For the Scottish Literary Renaissance in the mid-twentieth century, Dunbar was a touchstone. Many tried to imitate his style and "high-brow" subject matter, such as Hugh MacDiarmid and Sydney Goodsir Smith. As MacDiarmid himself said, they had to go "back to Dunbar". To make Dunbar more accessible to the modern reader, Selected Poems of William Dunbar: An Interlinear Translation was published by Lawrence Siegler in 2010.

Dunbar is commemorated in Makars' Court, outside The Writers' Museum, Lawnmarket, Edinburgh.

== Works ==
- Ane Dance in the Quenis Chalmer
- The Dregy Of Dunbar
- The Fenyeit Freir of Tungland
- The Flyting of Dumbar and Kennedie
- The Twa Cummeris
- The Goldyn Targe
- He Is Na Dog, He Is a Lam
- On His Heid-Ake
- Of Ane Blak-Moir
- Of James Dog
- Lament for the Makaris (Timor mortis conturbat me)
- Meditatioun In Wyntir
- The Petition of The Gray Horse, Auld Dunbar
- Remonstrance to the King (Schir, ye have mony servitouris)
- The Thrissil and the Rois
- The Tua Mariit Wemen and the Wedo

== See also ==
- Lament for the Makaris, in which Dunbar discusses his 'poetic facultie'
