= Maitland Manuscripts =

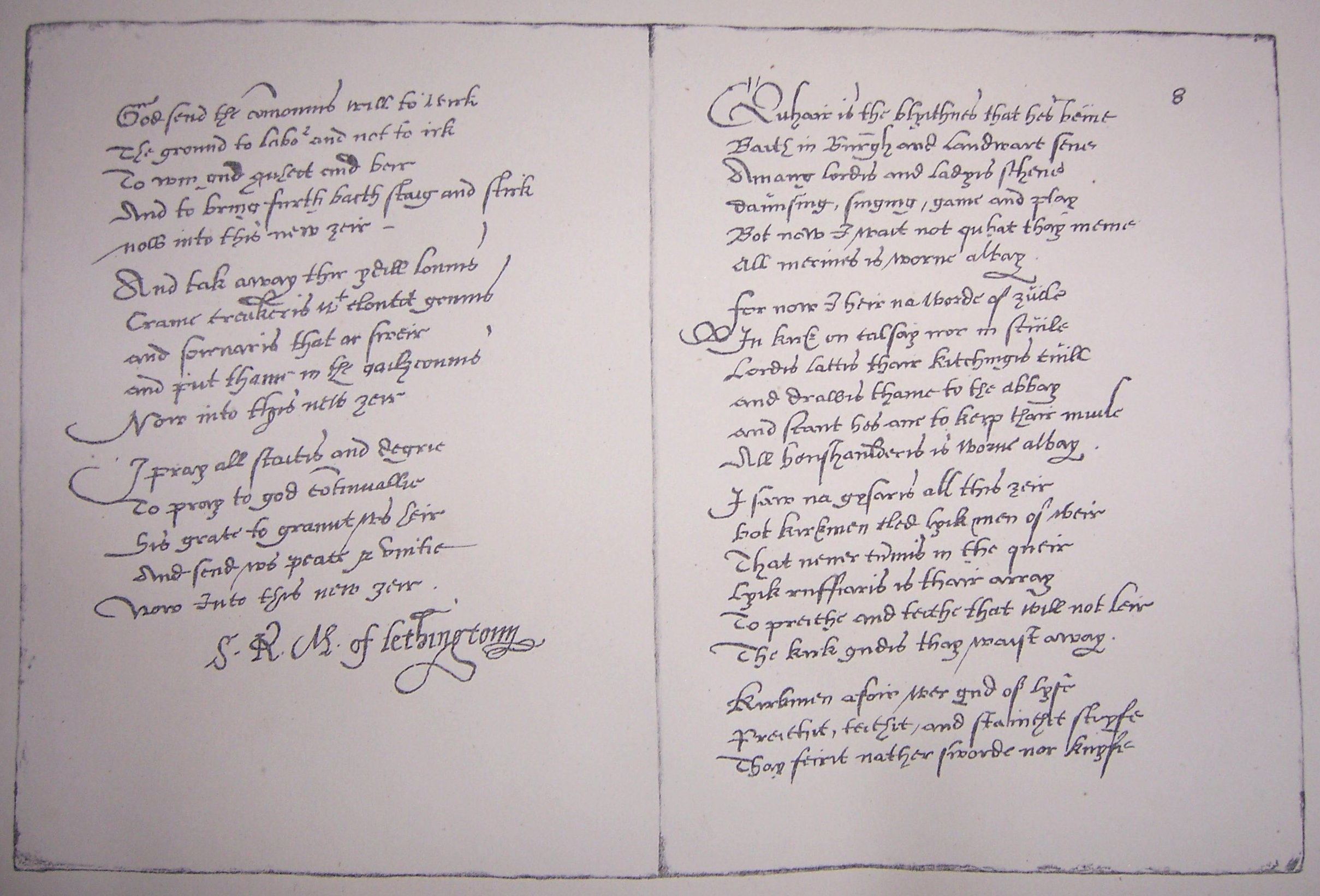
Pages from The Maitland Quarto Manuscript held by the Pepys Library. Maitland's signature is prominent.

The Maitland Manuscripts are an important source for the Scots literature of the Fifteenth and Sixteenth Centuries. They contain texts of the work of the makars of the period and much material which is not attributed to any author.

There are two manuscripts, one in quarto form and another in folio form.

The folio manuscript largely consists of works by the leading authors of the era. The quarto manuscript is dominated by Maitland's own writing.

Both volumes were compiled by the judge, statesman and author Richard Maitland of Lethington during the Sixteenth Century. Many of the pieces in the manuscripts are his own work.

The manuscripts are held in the Pepys Library of Magdalene College, Cambridge

== Authors represented in the manuscripts ==
Among the named authors whose works are contained in the manuscripts are;

- Robert Henryson
- William Dunbar
- Gavin Douglas

Some verse is attributed to Maitland's daughter, Marie Maitland.
