= Scots-language literature =

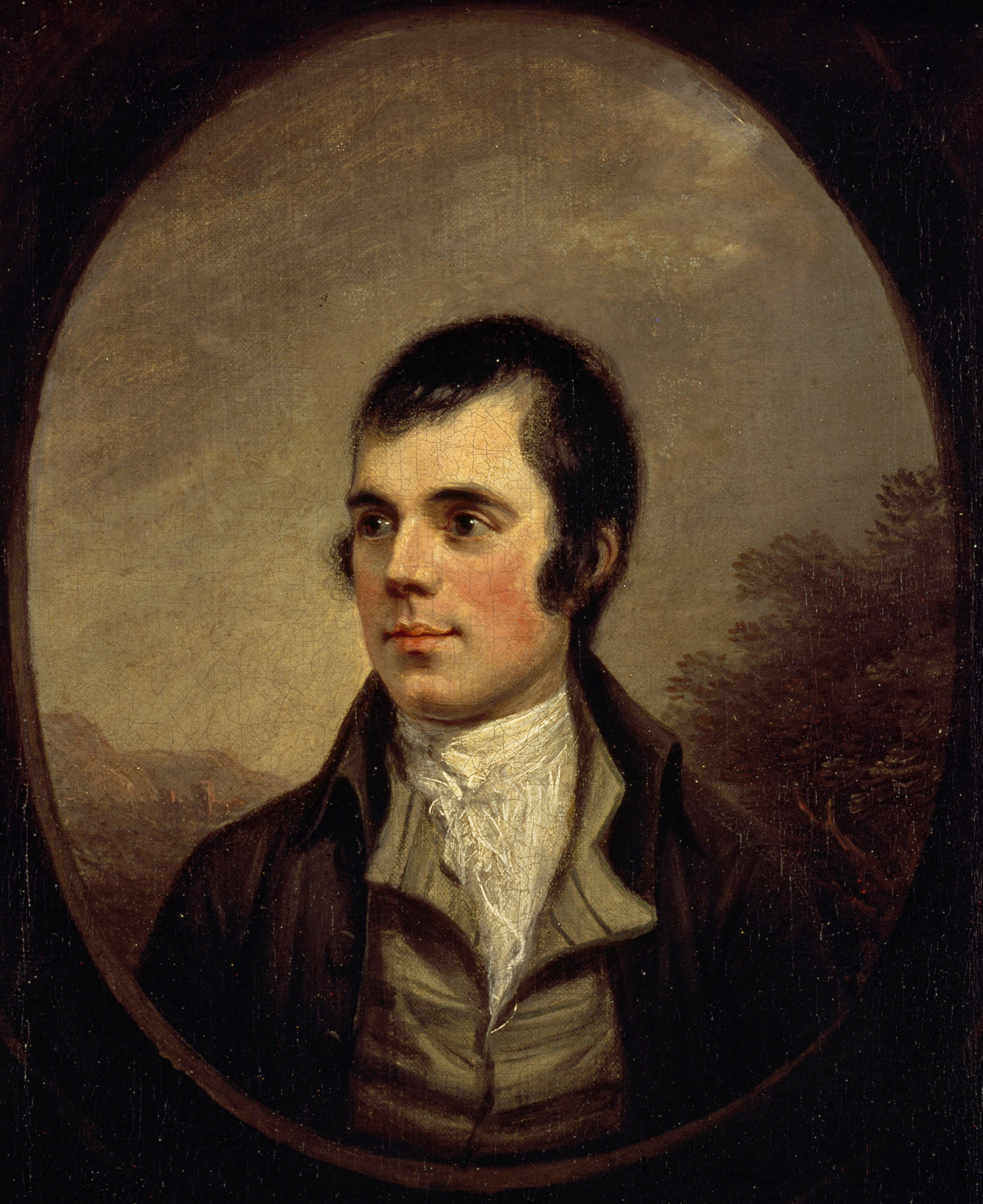
1787 portrait of Robert Burns by Alexander Nasmyth

Scots-language literature is literature, including poetry, prose and drama, written in the Scots language in its many forms and derivatives. Middle Scots became the dominant language of Scotland in the late Middle Ages. The first surviving major text in Scots literature is John Barbour's Brus (1375). Some ballads may date back to the thirteenth century, but were not recorded until the eighteenth century. In the early fifteenth century Scots historical works included Andrew of Wyntoun's verse Orygynale Cronykil of Scotland and Blind Harry's The Wallace. Much Middle Scots literature was produced by makars, poets with links to the royal court, which included James I, who wrote the extended poem The Kingis Quair. Writers such as William Dunbar, Robert Henryson, Walter Kennedy and Gavin Douglas have been seen as creating a golden age in Scottish poetry. In the late fifteenth century, Scots prose also began to develop as a genre. The first complete surviving work is John Ireland's The Meroure of Wyssdome (1490). There were also prose translations of French books of chivalry that survive from the 1450s. The landmark work in the reign of James IV was Gavin Douglas's version of Virgil's Aeneid.

James V supported William Stewart and John Bellenden, who translated the Latin History of Scotland compiled in 1527 by Hector Boece, into verse and prose. David Lyndsay wrote elegiac narratives, romances and satires. From the 1550s cultural pursuits were limited by the lack of a royal court and the Kirk heavily discouraged poetry that was not devotional. Nevertheless, poets from this period included Richard Maitland of Lethington, John Rolland and Alexander Hume. Alexander Scott's use of short verse designed to be sung to music, opened the way for the Castilan poets of James VI's adult reign. who included William Fowler, John Stewart of Baldynneis, and Alexander Montgomerie. Plays in Scots included Lyndsay's The Thrie Estaitis, the anonymous The Maner of the Cyring of ane Play and Philotus. After his accession to the English throne, James VI increasingly favoured the language of southern England and the loss of the court as a centre of patronage in 1603 was a major blow to Scottish literature. The poets who followed the king to London began to anglicise their written language and only significant court poet to continue to work in Scotland after the king's departure was William Drummond of Hawthornden.

After the Union in 1707 the use of Scots was discouraged. Allan Ramsay (1686–1758) is often described as leading a "vernacular revival" and he laid the foundations of a reawakening of interest in older Scottish literature. He was part of a community of poets working in Scots and English that included William Hamilton of Gilbertfield, Robert Crawford, Alexander Ross, William Hamilton of Bangour, Alison Rutherford Cockburn and James Thomson. Also important was Robert Fergusson. Robert Burns is widely regarded as the national poet of Scotland, working in both Scots and English. His "Auld Lang Syne" is often sung at Hogmanay, and "Scots Wha Hae" served for a long time as an unofficial national anthem. Scottish poetry is often seen as entering a period of decline in the nineteenth century, with Scots-language poetry criticised for its use of parochial dialect. Conservative and anti-radical Burns clubs sprang up around Scotland, filled with poets who fixated on the "Burns stanza" as a form. Scottish poetry has been seen as descending into infantalism as exemplified by the highly popular Whistle Binkie anthologies, leading into the sentimental parochialism of the Kailyard school. Poets from the lower social orders who used Scots included the weaver-poet William Thom. Walter Scott, the leading literary figure of the early nineteenth century, largely wrote in English, and Scots was confined to dialogue or interpolated narrative, in a model that would be followed by other novelists such as John Galt and Robert Louis Stevenson. James Hogg provided a Scots counterpart to the work of Scott. However, popular Scottish newspapers regularly included articles and commentary in the vernacular and there was an interest in translations into Scots from other Germanic languages, such as Danish, Swedish and German, including those by Robert Jamieson and Robert Williams Buchanan.

In the early twentieth century there was a new surge of activity in Scottish literature, influenced by modernism and resurgent nationalism, known as the Scottish Renaissance. The leading figure in the movement was Hugh MacDiarmid who attempted to revive the Scots language as a medium for serious literature, developing a form of Synthetic Scots that combined different regional dialects and archaic terms. Other writers that emerged in this period, and are often treated as part of the movement, include the poets Edwin Muir and William Soutar. Some writers that emerged after the Second World War followed MacDiarmid by writing in Scots, including Robert Garioch, Sydney Goodsir Smith and Edwin Morgan, who became known for translations of works from a wide range of European languages. Alexander Gray is chiefly remembered for this translations into Scots from the German and Danish ballad traditions into Scots. Writers who reflected urban contemporary Scots included Douglas Dunn, Tom Leonard and Liz Lochhead. The Scottish Renaissance increasingly concentrated on the novel. George Blake pioneered the exploration of the experiences of the working class. Lewis Grassic Gibbon produced one of the most important realisations of the ideas of the Scottish Renaissance in his trilogy A Scots Quair. Other writers that investigated the working class included James Barke and J. F. Hendry. From the 1980s Scottish literature enjoyed another major revival, particularly associated with a group of Glasgow writers that included Alasdair Gray and James Kelman were among the first novelists to fully utilise a working class Scots voice as the main narrator. Irvine Welsh and Alan Warner both made use of vernacular language including expletives and words from the Scots language.

== Background ==
In the late Middle Ages, Middle Scots, often simply called English, became the dominant language of the country. It was derived largely from Old English, with the addition of elements from Gaelic and French. Although resembling the language spoken in northern England, it became a distinct dialect from the late fourteenth century onwards. It began to be adopted by the ruling elite as they gradually abandoned French. By the fifteenth century it was the language of government, with acts of parliament, council records and treasurer's accounts almost all using it from the reign of James I (1406–1437) onwards. As a result, Gaelic, once dominant north of the Tay, began a steady decline.

== Development ==
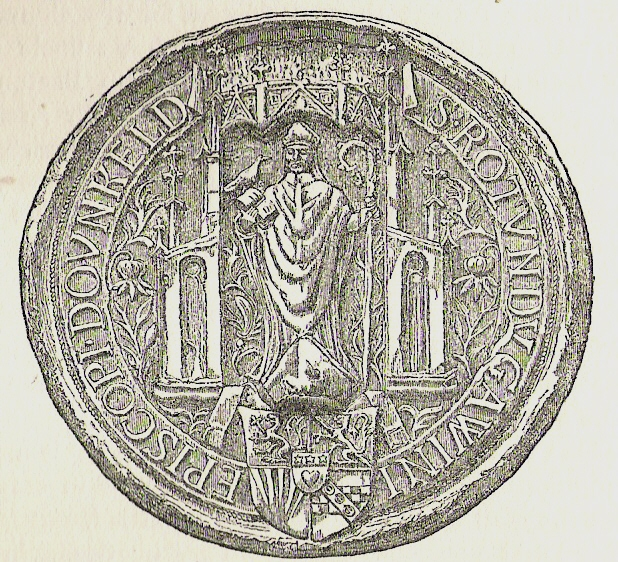
The seal of Gavin Douglas as Bishop of Dunkeld

The first surviving major text in Scots literature is John Barbour's Brus (1375), composed under the patronage of Robert II and telling the story in epic poetry of Robert I's actions before the English invasion until the end of the first war of independence. The work was extremely popular among the Scots-speaking aristocracy and Barbour is referred to as the father of Scots poetry, holding a similar place to his contemporary Chaucer in England. Some Scots ballads may date back to the late medieval era and deal with events and people that can be traced back as far as the thirteenth century, including "Sir Patrick Spens" and "Thomas the Rhymer", but which are not known to have existed until they were collected and recorded in the eighteenth century. They were probably composed and transmitted orally and only began to be written down and printed, often as broadsides and as part of chapbooks, later being recorded and noted in books by collectors including Robert Burns and Walter Scott. In the early fifteenth century Scots historical works included Andrew of Wyntoun's verse Orygynale Cronykil of Scotland and Blind Harry's The Wallace, which blended historical romance with the verse chronicle. They were probably influenced by Scots versions of popular French romances that were also produced in the period, including The Buik of Alexander, Launcelot o the Laik, The Porteous of Noblenes by Gilbert Hay.

Much Middle Scots literature was produced by makars, poets with links to the royal court, which included James I, who wrote the extended poem The Kingis Quair. Many of the makars had university education and so were also connected with the Kirk. However, William Dunbar's (1460–1513) Lament for the Makaris (c. 1505) provides evidence of a wider tradition of secular writing outside of Court and Kirk now largely lost. Writers such as Dunbar, Robert Henryson, Walter Kennedy and Gavin Douglas have been seen as creating a golden age in Scottish poetry. Major works include Richard Holland's satire the Buke of the Howlat (c. 1448). Dunbar produced satires, lyrics, invectives and dream visions that established the vernacular as a flexible medium for poetry of any kind. Robert Henryson (c. 1450-c. 1505), re-worked Medieval and Classical sources, such as Chaucer and Aesop in works such as his Testament of Cresseid and The Morall Fabillis. Gavin Douglas (1475–1522), who became Bishop of Dunkeld, injected Humanist concerns and classical sources into his poetry. Much of their work survives in a single collection. The Bannatyne Manuscript was collated by George Bannatyne (1545–1608) around 1560 and contains the work of many Scots poets who would otherwise be unknown.

In the late fifteenth century, Scots prose also began to develop as a genre. Although there are earlier fragments of original Scots prose, such as the Auchinleck Chronicle, the first complete surviving work is John Ireland's The Meroure of Wyssdome (1490). There were also prose translations of French books of chivalry that survive from the 1450s, including The Book of the Law of Armys and the Order of Knychthode and the treatise Secreta Secetorum, an Arabic work believed to be Aristotle's advice to Alexander the Great. The landmark work in the reign of James IV was Gavin Douglas's version of Virgil's Aeneid, the Eneados, which was the first complete translation of a major classical text in an Anglic language, finished in 1513, but overshadowed by the disaster at Flodden in the same year.

== Golden age ==
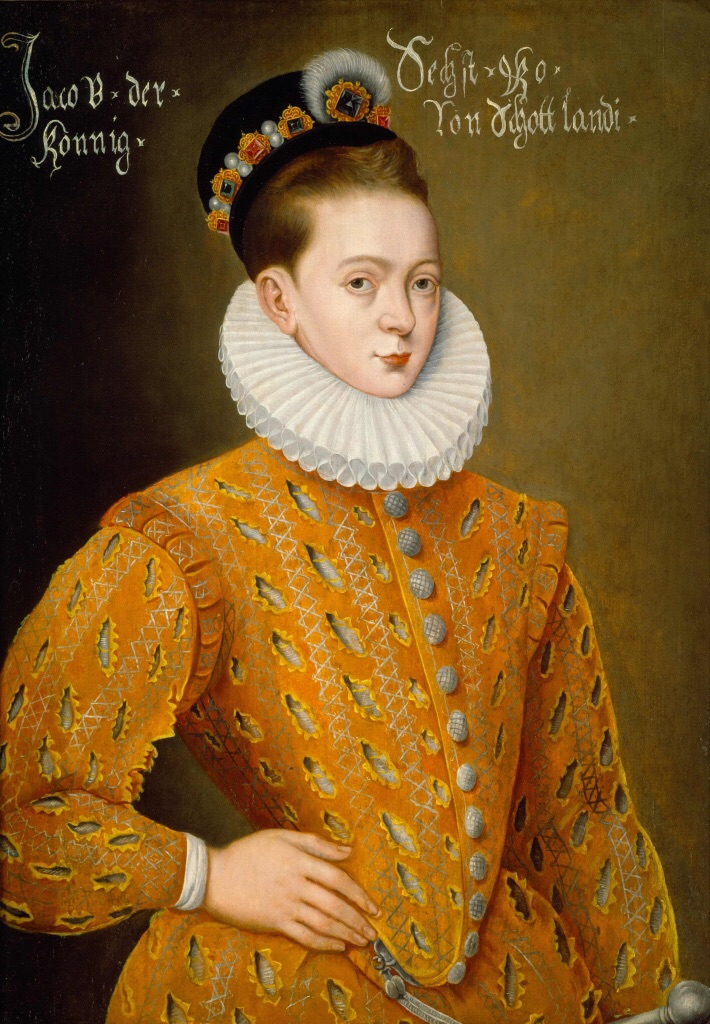
James VI in 1585, aged 19. He promoted poetry in his native Scots but abandoned it after he acceded to the English throne in 1603.

As a patron of poets and authors James V (r. 1513–42) supported William Stewart and John Bellenden, who translated the Latin History of Scotland compiled in 1527 by Hector Boece, into verse and prose. David Lyndsay (c. 1486 – 1555), diplomat and the head of the Lyon Court, was a prolific poet. He wrote elegiac narratives, romances and satires. From the 1550s, in the reign of Mary, Queen of Scots (r. 1542–67) and the minority of her son James VI (r. 1567–1625), cultural pursuits were limited by the lack of a royal court and by political turmoil. The Kirk, heavily influenced by Calvinism, also discouraged poetry that was not devotional in nature. Nevertheless, poets from this period included Richard Maitland of Lethington (1496–1586), who produced meditative and satirical verses in the style of Dunbar; John Rolland (fl. 1530–75), who wrote allegorical satires in the tradition of Douglas and courtier and minister Alexander Hume (c. 1556–1609), whose corpus of work includes nature poetry and epistolary verse. Alexander Scott's (?1520–82/3) use of short verse designed to be sung to music, opened the way for the Castilan poets of James VI's adult reign.

From the mid sixteenth century, written Scots was increasingly influenced by the developing Standard English of Southern England due to developments in royal and political interactions with England. The English supplied books and distributing Bibles and Protestant literature in the Lowlands when they invaded in 1547. With the increasing influence and availability of books printed in England, most writing in Scotland came to be done in the English fashion. Leading figure of the Scottish Reformation John Knox was accused of being hostile to Scots because he wrote in a Scots-inflected English developed while in exile at the English court.

In the 1580s and 1590s James VI strongly promoted the literature of the country of his birth in Scots. His treatise, Some Rules and Cautions to be Observed and Eschewed in Scottish Prosody, published in 1584 when he was aged 18, was both a poetic manual and a description of the poetic tradition in his mother tongue, to which he applied Renaissance principles. He became patron and member of a loose circle of Scottish Jacobean court poets and musicians, later called the Castalian Band, which included William Fowler (c. 1560 – 1612), John Stewart of Baldynneis (c. 1545 – c. 1605), and Alexander Montgomerie (c. 1550 – 1598). They translated key Renaissance texts and produced poems using French forms, including sonnets and short sonnets, for narrative, nature description, satire and meditations on love. Later poets that followed in this vein included William Alexander (c. 1567 – 1640), Alexander Craig (c. 1567 – 1627) and Robert Ayton (1570–1627). By the late 1590s the king's championing of his native Scottish tradition was to some extent diffused by the prospect of inheriting of the English throne.

In drama Lyndsay produced an interlude at Linlithgow Palace for the king and queen thought to be a version of his play The Thrie Estaitis in 1540, which satirised the corruption of church and state, and which is the only complete play to survive from before the Reformation. The anonymous The Maner of the Cyring of ane Play (before 1568) and Philotus (published in London in 1603), are isolated examples of surviving plays. The latter is a vernacular Scots comedy of errors, probably designed for court performance for Mary, Queen of Scots or James VI.

== Decline ==
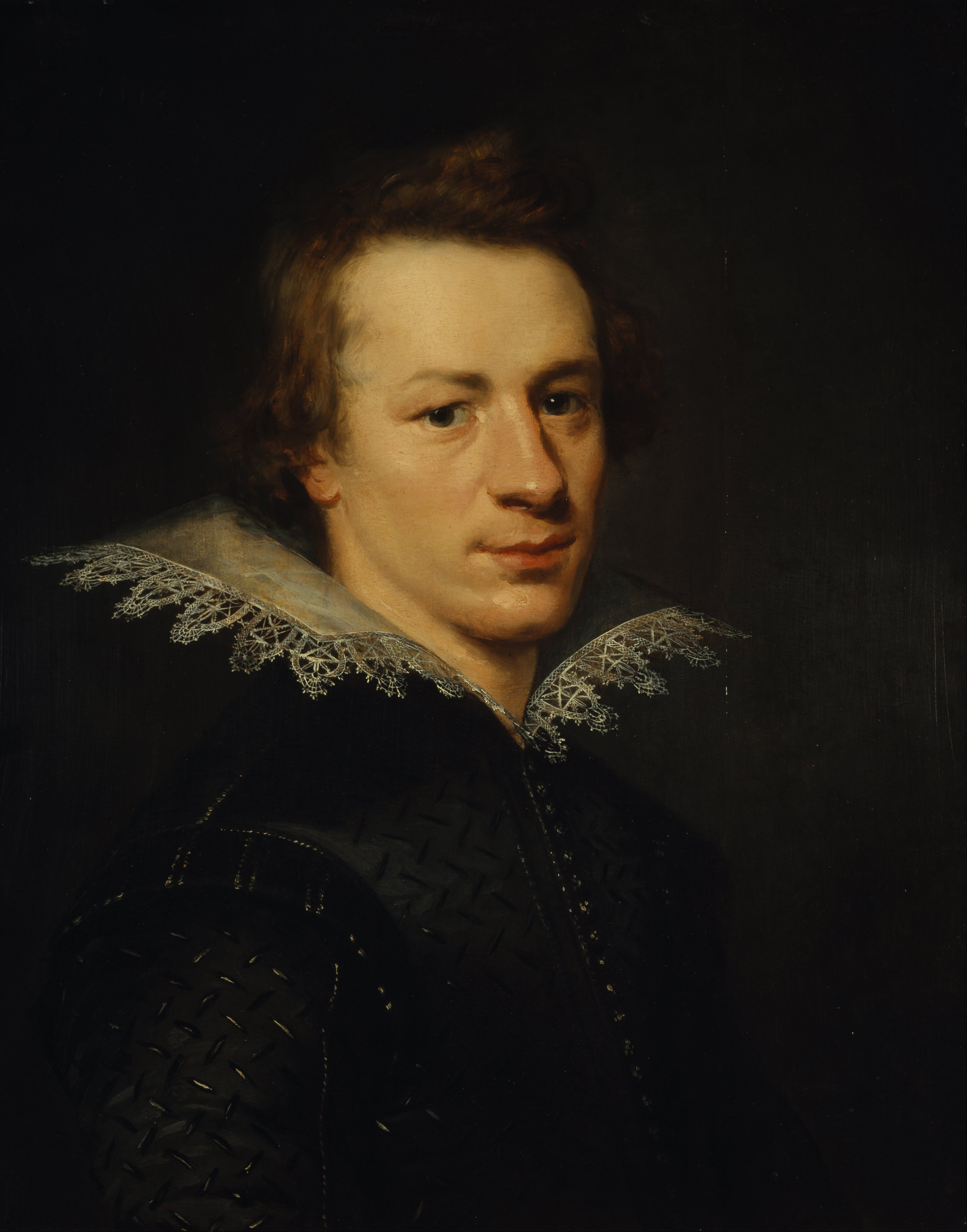
William Drummond of Hawthornden

Having extolled the virtues of Scots "poesie", after his accession to the English throne, James VI increasingly favoured the language of southern England. In 1611 the Kirk adopted the English Authorised King James Version of the Bible. In 1617 interpreters were declared no longer necessary in the port of London because Scots and Englishmen were now "not so far different bot ane understandeth ane uther". Jenny Wormald, describes James as creating a "three-tier system, with Gaelic at the bottom and English at the top". The loss of the court as a centre of patronage in 1603 was a major blow to Scottish literature. A number of Scottish poets, including William Alexander, John Murray and Robert Aytoun accompanied the king to London, where they continued to write, but they soon began to anglicise their written language. James's characteristic role as active literary participant and patron in the English court made him a defining figure for English Renaissance poetry and drama, which would reach a pinnacle of achievement in his reign, but his patronage for the high style in his own Scottish tradition largely became sidelined. The only significant court poet to continue to work in Scotland after the king's departure was William Drummond of Hawthornden (1585–1649), and he largely abandoned Scots for a form of court English. The most influential Scottish literary figure of the mid-seventeenth century, Thomas Urquhart of Cromarty (1611 – c. 1660), who translated The Works of Rabelais, worked largely in English, only using occasional Scots for effect. In the late seventeenth century it looked as if Scots might disappear as a literary language.

== Revival ==
Following the Acts of Union 1707 which united Scotland and England, the use of Scots was discouraged by leading figures in Scottish authority and education. Intellectuals of the Scottish Enlightenment like David Hume and Adam Smith, went to great lengths to get rid of every Scotticism from their writings. Following such examples, many well-off Scots took to learning English through the activities of those such as Thomas Sheridan, who in 1761 gave a series of lectures on English elocution. Charging a guinea at a time (about £200 in today's money,) they were attended by over 300 men, and he was made a freeman of the City of Edinburgh. Following this, some of the city's intellectuals formed the Select Society for Promoting the Reading and Speaking of the English Language in Scotland. From such eighteenth-century activities grew Scottish Standard English. Scots remained the vernacular of many rural communities and the growing number of urban working class Scots.

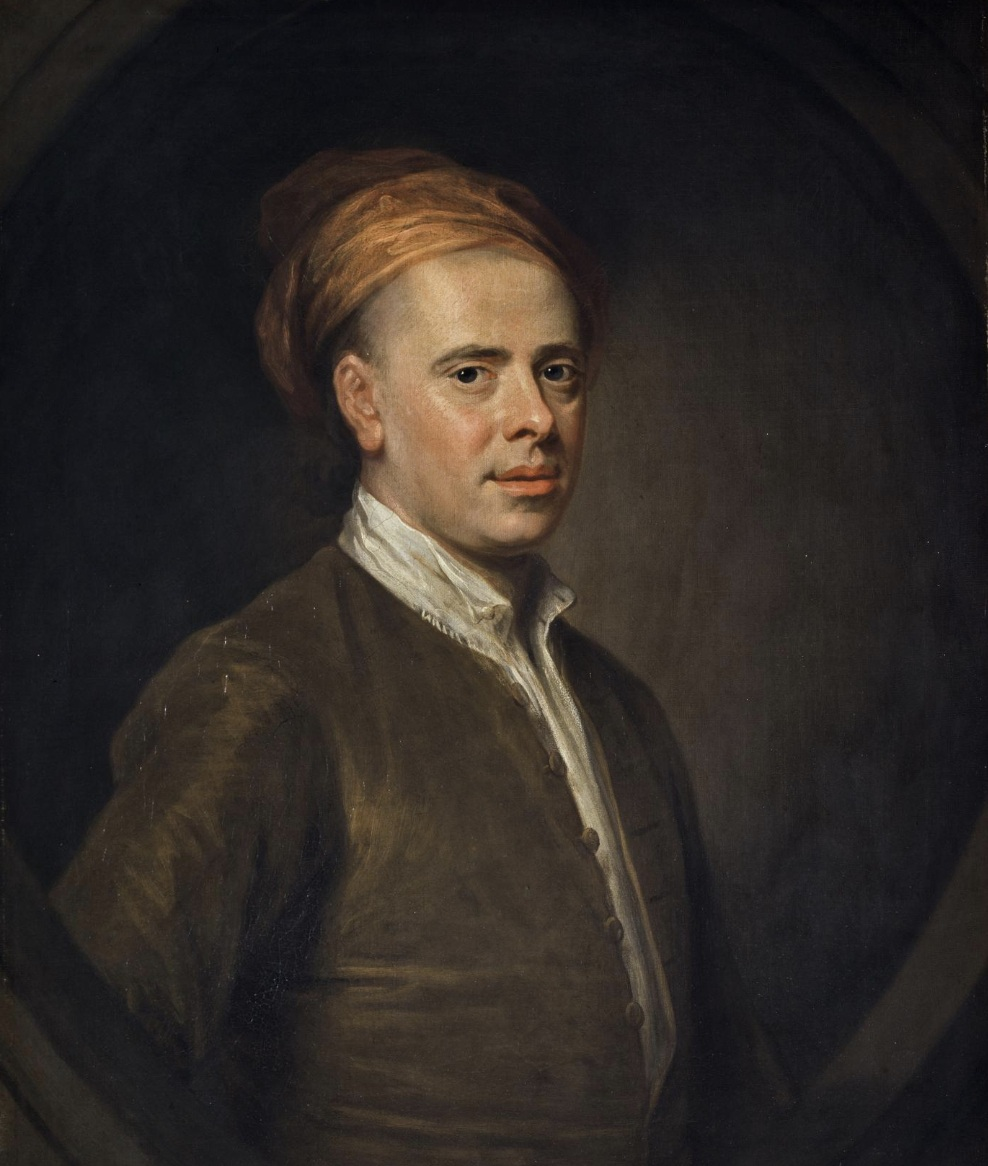
Allan Ramsay who led a vernacular revival in the eighteenth century

Allan Ramsay (1686–1758) was the most important literary figure of the era, often described as leading a "vernacular revival". He laid the foundations of a reawakening of interest in older Scottish literature, publishing The Ever Green (1724), a collection that included many major poetic works of the Stewart period. He led the trend for pastoral poetry, helping to develop the Habbie stanza, which would be later be used by Robert Burns as a poetic form. His Tea-Table Miscellany (1724–37) contained poems old Scots folk material, his own poems in the folk style and "gentilizings" of Scots poems in the English neo-classical style. Ramsay was part of a community of poets working in Scots and English. These included William Hamilton of Gilbertfield (c. 1665 – 1751), Robert Crawford (1695–1733), Alexander Ross (1699–1784), the Jacobite William Hamilton of Bangour (1704–1754), socialite Alison Rutherford Cockburn (1712–1794), and poet and playwright James Thomson (1700–1748). Also important was Robert Fergusson (1750–1774), a largely urban poet, recognised in his short lifetime as the unofficial "laureate" of Edinburgh. His most famous work was his unfinished long poem, Auld Reekie (1773), dedicated to the life of the city. His borrowing from a variety of dialects prefigured the creation of Synthetic Scots in the twentieth century and he would be a major influence on Robert Burns.

Burns (1759–1796), an Ayrshire poet and lyricist, is widely regarded as the national poet of Scotland and a major figure in the Romantic movement. As well as making original compositions, Burns also collected folk songs from across Scotland, often revising or adapting them. His poem (and song) "Auld Lang Syne" is often sung at Hogmanay (the last day of the year), and "Scots Wha Hae" served for a long time as an unofficial national anthem of the country. Burns's poetry drew upon a substantial familiarity with and knowledge of Classical, Biblical, and English literature, as well as the Scottish Makar tradition. Burns was skilled in writing not only in the Scots language but also in the Scottish English dialect of the English language. Some of his works, such as "Love and Liberty" (also known as "The Jolly Beggars"), are written in both Scots and English for various effects. His themes included republicanism, radicalism, Scottish patriotism, anticlericalism, class inequalities, gender roles, commentary on the Scottish Kirk of his time, Scottish cultural identity, poverty, sexuality, and the beneficial aspects of popular socialising.

== Marginalisation ==
Scottish poetry is often seen as entering a period of decline in the nineteenth century, with Scots-language poetry criticised for its use of parochial dialect. Conservative and anti-radical Burns clubs sprang up around Scotland, filled with members that praised a sanitised version of Robert Burns' life and work and poets who fixated on the "Burns stanza" as a form. Scottish poetry has been seen as descending into infantalism as exemplified by the highly popular Whistle Binkie anthologies, which appeared 1830–90 and which notoriously included in one volume "Wee Willie Winkie" by William Miler (1810–1872). This tendency has been seen as leading late-nineteenth-century Scottish poetry into the sentimental parochialism of the Kailyard school. Poets from the lower social orders who used Scots included the weaver-poet William Thom (1799–1848), whose his "A chieftain unknown to the Queen" (1843) combined simple Scots language with a social critique of Queen Victoria's visit to Scotland.

Walter Scott (1771–1832), the leading literary figure of the era began his career as a ballad collector and became the most popular poet in Britain and then its most successful novelist. His works were largely written in English and Scots was largely confined to dialogue or interpolated narrative, in a model that would be followed by other novelists such as John Galt (1779–1839) and later Robert Louis Stevenson (1850–1894). James Hogg (1770–1835) worked largely in Scots, providing a counterpart to Scott's work in English. Popular Scottish newspapers regularly included articles and commentary in the vernacular.

There was an interest in translations into Scots from other Germanic languages, such as Danish, Swedish and German. These included Robert Jamieson's (c. 1780–1844) Popular Ballads And Songs From Tradition, Manuscripts And Scarce Editions With Translations Of Similar Pieces From The Ancient Danish Language and Illustrations of Northern Antiquities (1814) and Robert Williams Buchanan's (1841–1901) Ballad Stories of the Affections (1866).

== Twentieth-century renaissance ==
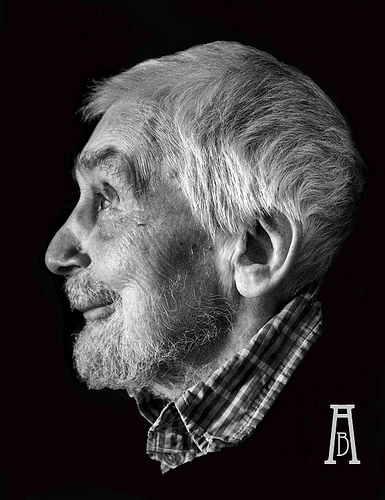
Edwin Morgan, poet, playwright and the first official Scots Makar

In the early twentieth century there was a new surge of activity in Scottish literature, influenced by modernism and resurgent nationalism, known as the Scottish Renaissance. The leading figure in the movement was Hugh MacDiarmid (the pseudonym of Christopher Murray Grieve, 1892–1978). MacDiarmid attempted to revive the Scots language as a medium for serious literature in poetic works including "A Drunk Man Looks at the Thistle" (1936), developing a form of Synthetic Scots that combined different regional dialects and archaic terms. Other writers that emerged in this period, and are often treated as part of the movement, include the poets Edwin Muir (1887–1959) and William Soutar (1898–1943), who pursued an exploration of identity, rejecting nostalgia and parochialism and engaging with social and political issues. Some writers that emerged after the Second World War followed MacDiarmid by writing in Scots, including Robert Garioch (1909–1981) and Sydney Goodsir Smith (1915–1975). The Glaswegian poet Edwin Morgan (1920–2010) became known for translations of works from a wide range of European languages. He was also the first Scots Makar (the official national poet), appointed by the inaugural Scottish government in 2004. Alexander Gray was an academic and poet, but is chiefly remembered for this translations into Scots from the German and Danish ballad traditions into Scots, including Arrows. A Book of German Ballads and Folksongs Attempted in Scots (1932) and Four-and-Forty. A Selection of Danish Ballads Presented in Scots (1954).

The generation of poets that grew up in the postwar period included Douglas Dunn (born 1942), whose work has often seen a coming to terms with class and national identity within the formal structures of poetry and commenting on contemporary events, as in Barbarians (1979) and Northlight (1988). His most personal work is contained in the collection of Elegies (1985), which deal with the death of his first wife from cancer. Tom Leonard (born 1944), works in the Glaswegian dialect, pioneering the working class voice in Scottish poetry. Liz Lochhead (born 1947) also explored the lives of working-class people of Glasgow, but added an appreciation of female voices within a sometimes male dominated society. She also adapted classic texts into Scots, with versions of Molière's Tartuffe (1985) and The Misanthrope (1973–2005), while Edwin Morgan translated Cyrano de Bergerac (1992).

The Scottish Renaissance increasingly concentrated on the novel, particularly after the 1930s when Hugh MacDiarmid was living in isolation in Shetland and many of these were written in English and not Scots. However, George Blake pioneered the exploration of the experiences of the working class in his major works such as The Shipbuilders (1935). Lewis Grassic Gibbon, the pseudonym of James Leslie Mitchell, produced one of the most important realisations of the ideas of the Scottish Renaissance in his trilogy A Scots Quair (Sunset Song, 1932, Cloud Howe, 1933 and Grey Granite, 1934), which mixed different Scots dialects with the narrative voice. Other works that investigated the working class included James Barke's (1905–1958), Major Operation (1936) and The Land of the Leal (1939) and J. F. Hendry's (1912–1986) Fernie Brae (1947).

From the 1980s Scottish literature enjoyed another major revival, particularly associated with a group of Glasgow writers focused around meetings in the house of critic, poet and teacher Philip Hobsbaum (1932–2005). Also important in the movement was Peter Kravitz, editor of Polygon Books. These included Alasdair Gray (born 1934), whose epic Lanark (1981) built on the working class novel to explore realistic and fantastic narratives. James Kelman’s (born 1946) The Busconductor Hines (1984) and A Disaffection (1989) were among the first novels to fully utilise a working class Scots voice as the main narrator. In the 1990s major, prize winning, Scottish novels that emerged from this movement included Gray's Poor Things (1992), which investigated the capitalist and imperial origins of Scotland in an inverted version of the Frankenstein myth, Irvine Welsh's (born 1958), Trainspotting (1993), which dealt with the drug addiction in contemporary Edinburgh, Alan Warner’s (born 1964) Morvern Callar (1995), dealing with death and authorship and Kelman's How Late It Was, How Late (1994), a stream of consciousness novel dealing with a life of petty crime. These works were linked by a reaction to Thatcherism that was sometimes overtly political, and explored marginal areas of experience using vivid vernacular language (including expletives and Scots dialect). But'n'Ben A-Go-Go (2000) by Matthew Fitt is the first cyberpunk novel written entirely in Scots. One major outlet for literature in Lallans (Lowland Scots) is Lallans, the magazine of the Scots Language Society.
