= Poetry of Scotland =

Poetry written within the boundaries of modern Scotland

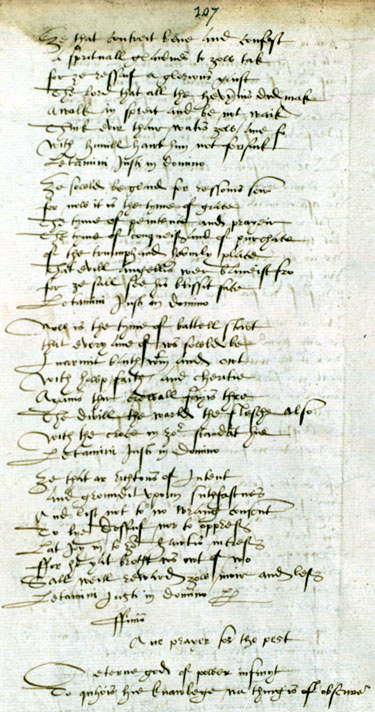
A page from The Bannatyne Manuscript, the major source for Scottish Medieval and Early Modern poetry

Poetry of Scotland includes all forms of verse written in Brythonic, Latin, Scottish Gaelic, Scots, French, English and Esperanto and any language in which poetry has been written within the boundaries of modern Scotland, or by Scottish people.

Much of the earliest Welsh literature was composed in or near Scotland, but only written down in Wales much later. These include The Gododdin, considered the earliest surviving verse from Scotland. Very few works of Gaelic poetry survive from this period and most of these in Irish manuscripts. The Dream of the Rood, from which lines are found on the Ruthwell Cross, is the only surviving fragment of Northumbrian Old English from early Medieval Scotland. In Latin early works include a "Prayer for Protection" attributed to St Mugint, and Altus Prosator ("The High Creator") attributed to St Columba. There were probably filidh who acted as poets, musicians and historians. After the "de-gallicisation" of the Scottish court from the twelfth century, bards continued to act in a similar role in the Highlands and Islands. What survives of their work was only recorded from the sixteenth century. This includes poems composed by women, including Aithbhreac Nighean Coirceadail. The first surviving major text in Scots literature is John Barbour's Brus (1375). In the early fifteenth century Scots historical works included Andrew of Wyntoun's verse Orygynale Cronykil of Scotland and Blind Harry's The Wallace. They were probably influenced by Scots versions of popular French romances that were produced in the period. Much Middle Scots literature was produced by makars, poets with links to the royal court, which included James I, who wrote the extended poem The Kingis Quair.

Makars at the court of James IV included Robert Henryson, William Dunbar and Gavin Douglas. Douglas's Eneados (1513) was the first complete translation of a major classical text in an Anglian language. James V supported William Stewart and John Bellenden. David Lyndsay wrote elegiac narratives, romances and satires. George Buchanan founded a tradition of neo-Latin poetry that would continue into the seventeenth century. From the 1550s cultural pursuits were limited by the lack of a royal court, political turmoil and discouragement from the Kirk. Poets from this period included Richard Maitland of Lethington, John Rolland), Alexander Hume and Alexander Scott. James VI promoted the literature in Scots and became patron and member of a loose circle of court poets and musicians, later called the Castalian Band, which included William Fowler, John Stewart of Baldynneis, and Alexander Montgomerie. After his accession to the English throne in 1603 James VI increasingly favoured the language of southern England and the loss of the court as a centre of patronage was a major blow to Scottish literature. A new tradition of vernacular Gaelic poetry began to emerge, including work by women such as Mary MacLeod of Harris. The tradition of neo-Latin poetry reached its fruition with the publication of the anthology of the Deliciae Poetarum Scotorum (1637). This period was marked by the work of female Scottish poets including Elizabeth Melville, whose Ane Godlie Dream (1603) was the first book published by a woman in Scotland. The ballad became a recognised literary form by aristocratic authors including Robert Sempill, Lady Elizabeth Wardlaw and Lady Grizel Baillie.

After the Union in 1707 Scottish literature developed a distinct national identity. Allan Ramsay led a "vernacular revival", the trend for pastoral poetry and developed the Habbie stanza. He was part of a community of poets working in Scots and English who included William Hamilton of Gilbertfield, Robert Crawford, Alexander Ross, William Hamilton of Bangour, Alison Rutherford Cockburn, and James Thomson. The eighteenth century was also a period of innovation in Gaelic vernacular poetry. Major figures included Rob Donn Mackay, Donnchadh Bàn Mac an t-Saoir, Uilleam Ross and Alasdair mac Mhaighstir Alasdair, who helped inspire a new form of nature poetry. James Macpherson was the first Scottish poet to gain an international reputation, claiming to have found poetry written by Ossian. Robert Burns is widely regarded as the national poet. The most important figure in Scottish Romanticism, Walter Scott, began his literary career as a poet and also collected and published Scottish ballads. Scottish poetry is often seen as entering a period of decline in the nineteenth century, with Scots poetry criticised for its use of parochial dialect, and for its lack of Scottishness in the English tongue. Successful poets included William Thom, Lady Margaret Maclean Clephane Compton Northampton and Thomas Campbell. Among the most influential poets of the later nineteenth were James Thomson and John Davidson. The Highland Clearances and widespread emigration weakened Gaelic language and culture and had a profound impact on the nature of Gaelic poetry. Particularly significant was the work of Uilleam Mac Dhun Lèibhe, Seonaidh Phàdraig Iarsiadair and Màiri Mhòr nan Óran.

In the early twentieth century there was a new surge of activity in Scottish literature, influenced by modernism and resurgent nationalism, known as the Scottish Renaissance. The leading figure, Hugh MacDiarmid, attempted to revive the Scots language as a medium for serious literature in poetic works including "A Drunk Man Looks at the Thistle" (1936) which developed a form of Synthetic Scots. Other writers connected with the movement included Edwin Muir and William Soutar. Writers that emerged after the Second World War who wrote in Scots included Robert Garioch and Sydney Goodsir Smith. Those working in English included Norman MacCaig, George Bruce and Maurice Lindsay and George Mackay Brown. The parallel revitalisation of Gaelic poetry, known as the Scottish Gaelic Renaissance was largely due to the work of Sorley Maclean. The generation of poets that grew up in the postwar period included Douglas Dunn, Tom Leonard, and Liz Lochhead. The 1980s and 1990s saw the emergence of a new generation of Scottish poets who became leading figures on the UK stage including Don Paterson, Robert Crawford, Carol Ann Duffy, Kathleen Jamie and Jackie Kay.

== Early Middle Ages ==
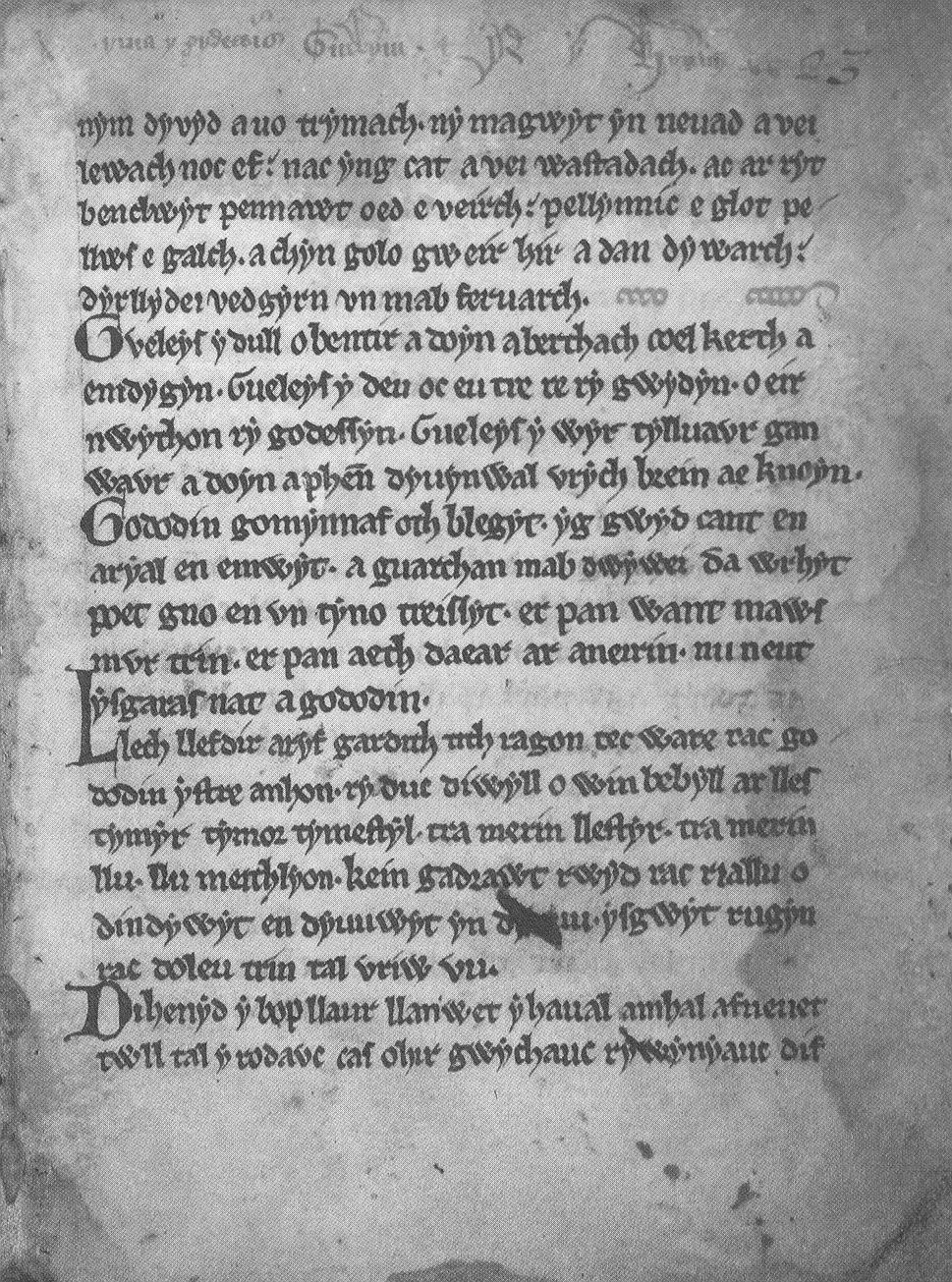
The first part of the text from the Gododdin from the Book of Aneirin, sixth century

Much of the earliest Welsh literature was actually composed in or near the country now called Scotland, in the Brythonic speech, from which Welsh would be derived. These works were only written down in Wales much later. These include The Gododdin, considered the earliest surviving verse from Scotland, which is attributed to the bard Aneirin, said to have been resident in Bythonic kingdom of Gododdin in the sixth century. It is a series of elegies to the men of the Gododdin killed fighting at the Battle of Catraeth around 600 AD. Similarly, the Battle of Gwen Ystrad is attributed to Taliesin, traditionally thought to be a bard at the court of Rheged in roughly the same period. Very few works of Gaelic poetry survive from the early medieval period, and most of these are in Irish manuscripts. These include poems in praise of Pictish kings contained within Irish annals.

In Old English there is The Dream of the Rood, from which lines are found on the Ruthwell Cross, making it the only surviving fragment of Northumbrian Old English from early Medieval Scotland. It has also been suggested on the basis of ornithological references that the poem The Seafarer was composed somewhere near the Bass Rock in East Lothian. In Latin early works include a "Prayer for Protection" attributed to St Mugint, thought to be from the mid-sixth century and Altus Prosator ("The High Creator") attributed to St Columba (c. 597). The most important piece of Scottish hagiography after Adomnán's Vita Columbae, is the verse Life of St. Ninian, written in Latin in Whithorn, perhaps as early as the eighth century.

== High Middle Ages ==
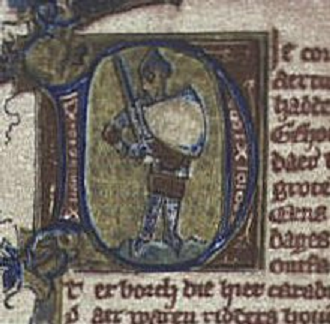
Picture from a fourteenth-century illuminated manuscript of the Roman de Fergus

The Kingdom of Alba was overwhelmingly an oral society dominated by Gaelic culture. Our fuller sources for Ireland of the same period suggest that there would have been filidh, who acted as poets, musicians and historians, often attached to the court of a lord or king, and passed on their knowledge and culture in Gaelic to the next generation. At least from the accession of David I (r. 1124–53), as part of a Davidian Revolution that introduced French culture and political systems, Gaelic ceased to be the main language of the royal court and was probably replaced by French. After this "de-gallicisation" of the Scottish court, a less highly regarded order of bards took over the functions of the filidh and they would continue to act in a similar role in the Highlands and Islands into the eighteenth century. They often trained in bardic schools, of which a few, like the one run by the MacMhuirich dynasty, who were bards to the Lord of the Isles, existed in Scotland and a larger number in Ireland, until they were suppressed from the seventeenth century. Members of bardic schools were trained in the complex rules and forms of Gaelic poetry. Much of their work was never written down and what survives was only recorded from the sixteenth century.

It is possible that more Middle Irish literature was written in Medieval Scotland than is often thought, but has not survived because the Gaelic literary establishment of eastern Scotland died out before the fourteenth century. Works that have survived include that of the prolific poet Gille Brighde Albanach (fl. 1200–30). His Heading for Damietta (c. 1218) dealt with his experiences of the Fifth Crusade. In the thirteenth century, French flourished as a literary language, and produced the Roman de Fergus, the earliest piece of non-Celtic vernacular literature to survive from Scotland. Many other stories in the Arthurian Cycle, written in French and preserved only outside Scotland, are thought by some scholars, including D. D. R. Owen, to have been written in Scotland. In addition to French, Latin was a literary language, with works that include the "Carmen de morte Sumerledi", a poem which exults triumphantly the victory of the citizens of Glasgow over the warlord Somairle mac Gilla Brigte.

== Late Middle Ages ==
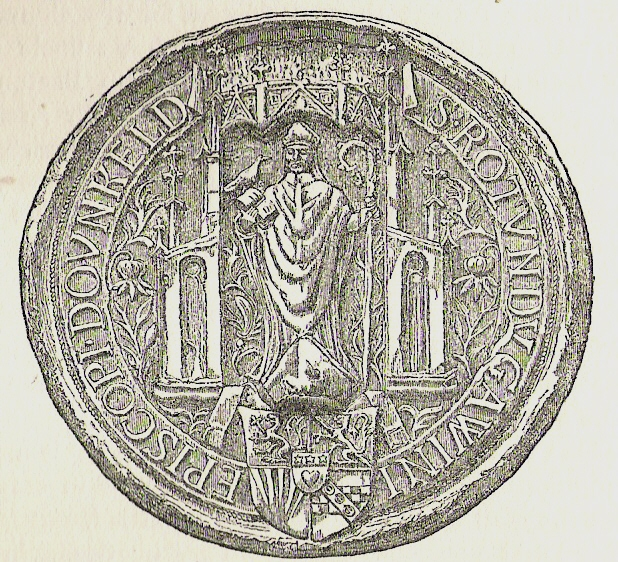
The seal of Gavin Douglas as Bishop of Dunkeld

The major corpus of Medieval Scottish Gaelic poetry, The Book of the Dean of Lismore was compiled by the brothers James and Donald MacGregor in the early decades of the sixteenth century. Beside Scottish Gaelic verse it contains a large number of poems composed in Ireland as well verse and prose in Scots and Latin. The subject matter includes love poetry, heroic ballads and philosophical pieces. It also is notable for containing poetry by at least four women. These include Aithbhreac Nighean Coirceadail (f. 1460), who wrote a lament for her husband, the constable of Castle Sween. The first surviving major text in Scots literature is John Barbour's Brus (1375), composed under the patronage of Robert II and telling the story in epic poetry of Robert I's actions before the English invasion until the end of the war of independence. The work was extremely popular among the Scots-speaking aristocracy and Barbour is referred to as the father of Scots poetry, holding a similar place to his contemporary Chaucer in England.

In the early fifteenth century Scots historical works included Andrew of Wyntoun's verse Orygynale Cronykil of Scotland and Blind Harry's The Wallace, which blended historical romance with the verse chronicle. They were probably influenced by Scots versions of popular French romances that were also produced in the period, including The Buik of Alexander, Launcelot o the Laik, The Porteous of Noblenes by Gilbert Hay and Greysteil, which would remain popular in to the late sixteenth century. Much Middle Scots literature was produced by makars, poets with links to the royal court, which included James I, who wrote the extended poem The Kingis Quair. Many of the makars had a university education and so were also connected with the Kirk. However, William Dunbar's Lament for the Makaris (c. 1505) provides evidence of a wider tradition of secular writing outside of Court and Kirk now largely lost. Major works include Richard Holland's satire the Buke of the Howlat (c. 1448). Much of their work survives in a single collection. The Bannatyne Manuscript was collated by George Bannatyne (1545–1608) around 1560 and contains the work of many Scots poets who would otherwise be unknown.

== Sixteenth century ==
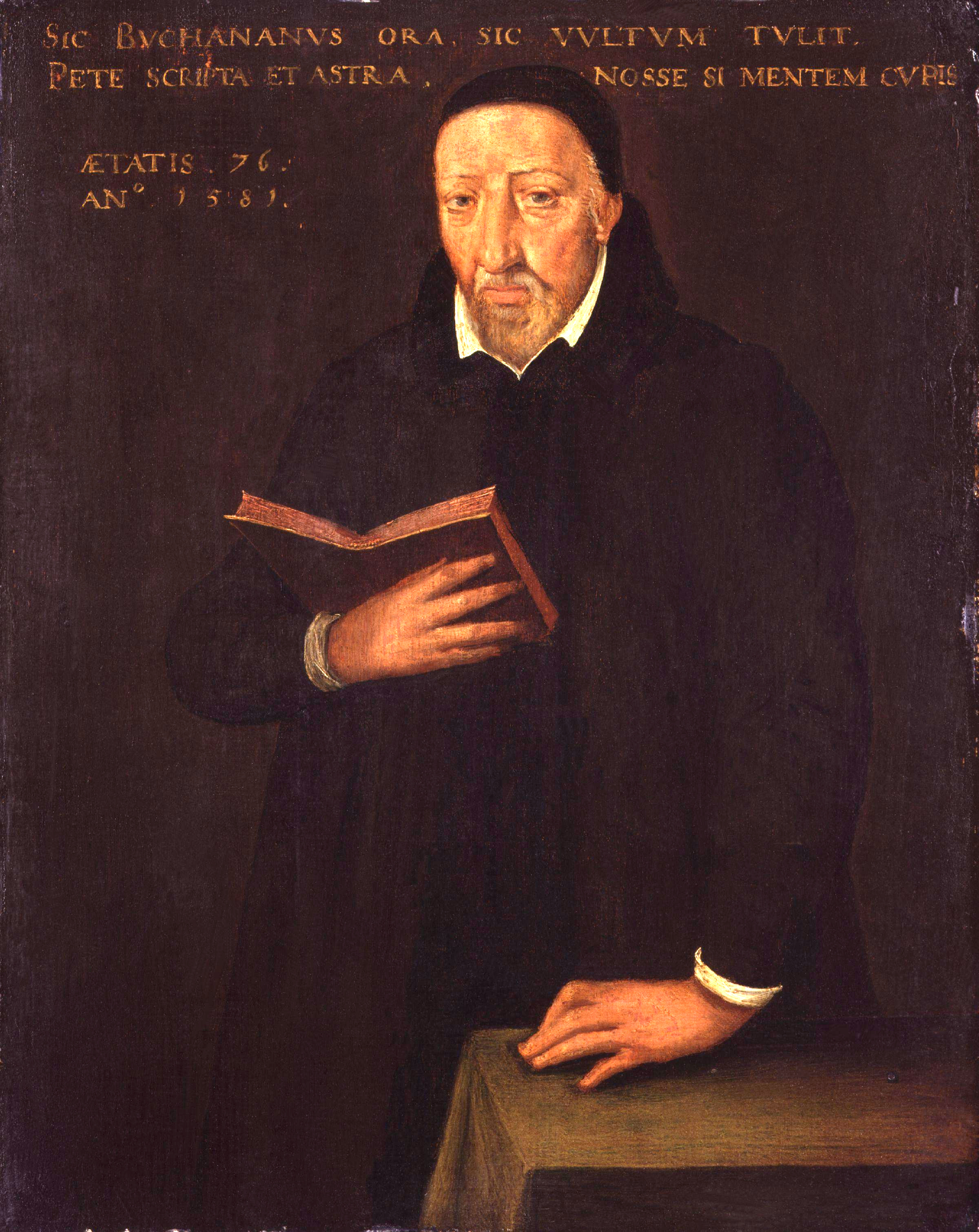
George Buchanan, playwright, poet and political theorist, by Arnold Bronckorst

James IV's (r. 1488–1513) creation of a Renaissance court included the patronage of makars who were mainly clerics. These included Robert Henryson (c. 1450-c. 1505), who re-worked medieval and Classical sources, such as Chaucer and Aesop in works such as his Testament of Cresseid and The Morall Fabillis. William Dunbar (1460–1513) produced satires, lyrics, invectives and dream visions that established the vernacular as a flexible medium for poetry of any kind. Gavin Douglas (1475–1522), who became Bishop of Dunkeld, injected Humanist concerns and classical sources into his poetry. The landmark work in the reign of James IV was Douglas's version of Virgil's Aeneid, the Eneados. It was the first complete translation of a major classical text in an Anglian language, finished in 1513, but overshadowed by the disaster at Flodden that brought the reign to an end.

As a patron of poets and authors James V (r. 1513–42) supported William Stewart and John Bellenden, who translated the Latin History of Scotland compiled in 1527 by Hector Boece, into verse and prose. David Lyndsay (c. 1486–1555), diplomat and the head of the Lyon Court, was a prolific poet. He wrote elegiac narratives, romances and satires. George Buchanan (1506–82) had a major influence as a Latin poet, founding a tradition of neo-Latin poetry that would continue in to the seventeenth century. Contributors to this tradition included royal secretary John Maitland (1537–95), reformer Andrew Melville (1545–1622), John Johnston (1570?–1611) and David Hume of Godscroft (1558–1629).

From the 1550s, in the reign of Mary, Queen of Scots (r. 1542–67) and the minority of her son James VI (r. 1567–1625), cultural pursuits were limited by the lack of a royal court and by political turmoil. The Kirk, heavily influenced by Calvinism, also discouraged poetry that was not devotional in nature. Nevertheless, poets from this period included Richard Maitland of Lethington (1496–1586), who produced meditative and satirical verses in the style of Dunbar; John Rolland (fl. 1530–75), who wrote allegorical satires in the tradition of Douglas and courtier and minister Alexander Hume (c. 1556–1609), whose corpus of work includes nature poetry and epistolary verse. Alexander Scott's (?1520-82/3) use of short verse designed to be sung to music, opened the way for the Castilian poets of James VI's adult reign.

Unlike many of his predecessors, James VI actively despised Gaelic culture. However, in the 1580s and 1590s he strongly promoted the literature of the country of his birth in Scots. His treatise, Some Rules and Cautions to be Observed and Eschewed in Scottish Prosody, published in 1584 when he was aged 18, was both a poetic manual and a description of the poetic tradition in his mother tongue, to which he applied Renaissance principles. He became patron and member of a loose circle of Scottish Jacobean court poets and musicians, later called the Castalian Band, which included William Fowler (c. 1560–1612), John Stewart of Baldynneis (c. 1545–c. 1605), and Alexander Montgomerie (c. 1550–98). They produced poems using French forms, including sonnets and short sonnets, for narrative, nature description, satire and meditations on love. Later poets that followed in this vein included William Alexander (c. 1567–1640), Alexander Craig (c. 1567–1627) and Robert Ayton (1570–1627). By the late 1590s the king's championing of his native Scottish tradition was to some extent diffused by the prospect of inheriting of the English throne.

== Seventeenth century ==
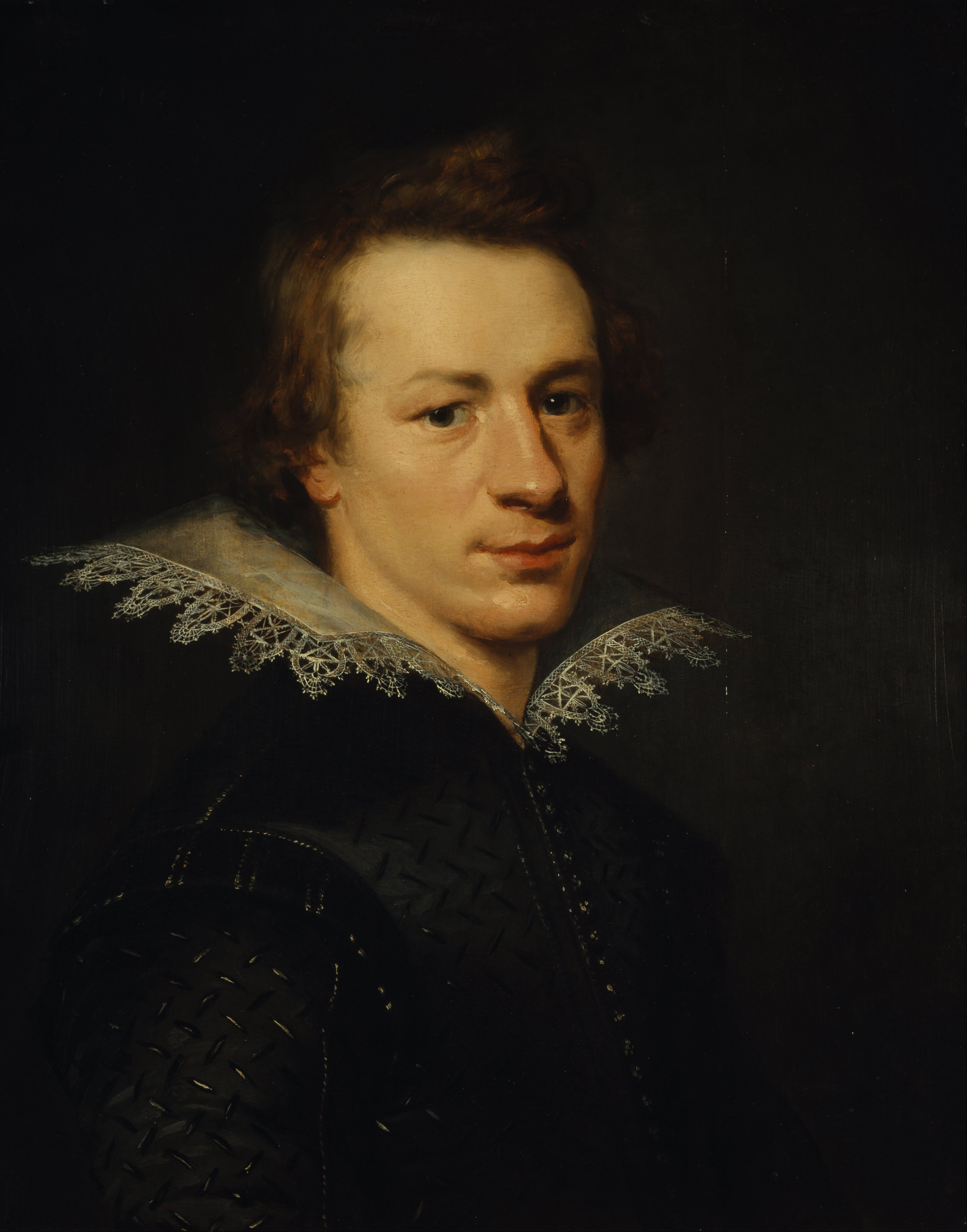
William Drummond of Hawthornden by Abraham Blyenberch, the only significant poet to remain in Scotland after James VI's departure for England

Having extolled the virtues of Scots "poesie", after his accession to the English throne, James VI increasingly favoured the language of southern England. The loss of the court as a centre of patronage in 1603 was a major blow to Scottish literature. A number of Scottish poets, including William Alexander, John Murray and Robert Aytoun accompanied the king to London, where they continued to write, but they soon began to anglicise their written language. James's characteristic role as active literary participant and patron in the Scottish court made him a defining figure for English Renaissance poetry and drama, which would reach a pinnacle of achievement in his reign, but his patronage for the high style in his own Scottish tradition largely became sidelined. The only significant court poet to continue to work in Scotland after the king's departure was William Drummond of Hawthornden (1585–1649).

As the tradition of classical Gaelic poetry declined, a new tradition of vernacular Gaelic poetry began to emerge. While Classical poetry used a language largely fixed in the twelfth century, the vernacular continued to develop. In contrast to the Classical tradition, which used syllabic metre, vernacular poets tended to use stressed metre. However, they shared with the Classic poets a set of complex metaphors and a common role, as the verse was still often panegyric. A number of these vernacular poets were women, such as Mary MacLeod of Harris (c. 1615–1707).

The tradition of neo-Latin poetry reached its fruition with the anthology of the Deliciae Poetarum Scotorum (1637), published in Amsterdam by Arthur Johnston (c.1579–1641) and Sir John Scott of Scotstarvet (1585–1670) and containing work by the major Scottish practitioners since Buchanan. This period was marked by the work of female Scottish poets. Elizabeth Melville's (f. 1585–1630) Ane Godlie Dream (1603) was a popular religious allegory and the first book published by a woman in Scotland. Anna Hume, daughter of David Hume of Godscroft, adapted Petrarch's Triumphs as Triumphs of Love: Chastitie: Death (1644).

This was the period when the ballad emerged as a significant written form in Scotland. Some ballads may date back to the late medieval era and deal with events and people, such as "Sir Patrick Spens" and "Thomas the Rhymer", that can be traced back as far as the thirteenth century, but in verses that were not recorded until the modern era. They were probably composed and transmitted orally and only began to be written down and printed, often as broadsides and as part of chapbooks, later being recorded and noted in books by collectors including Robert Burns and Walter Scott. From the seventeenth century they were used as a literary form by aristocratic authors including Robert Sempill (c. 1595-c. 1665), Lady Elizabeth Wardlaw (1627–1727) and Lady Grizel Baillie (1645–1746).

== Eighteenth century ==
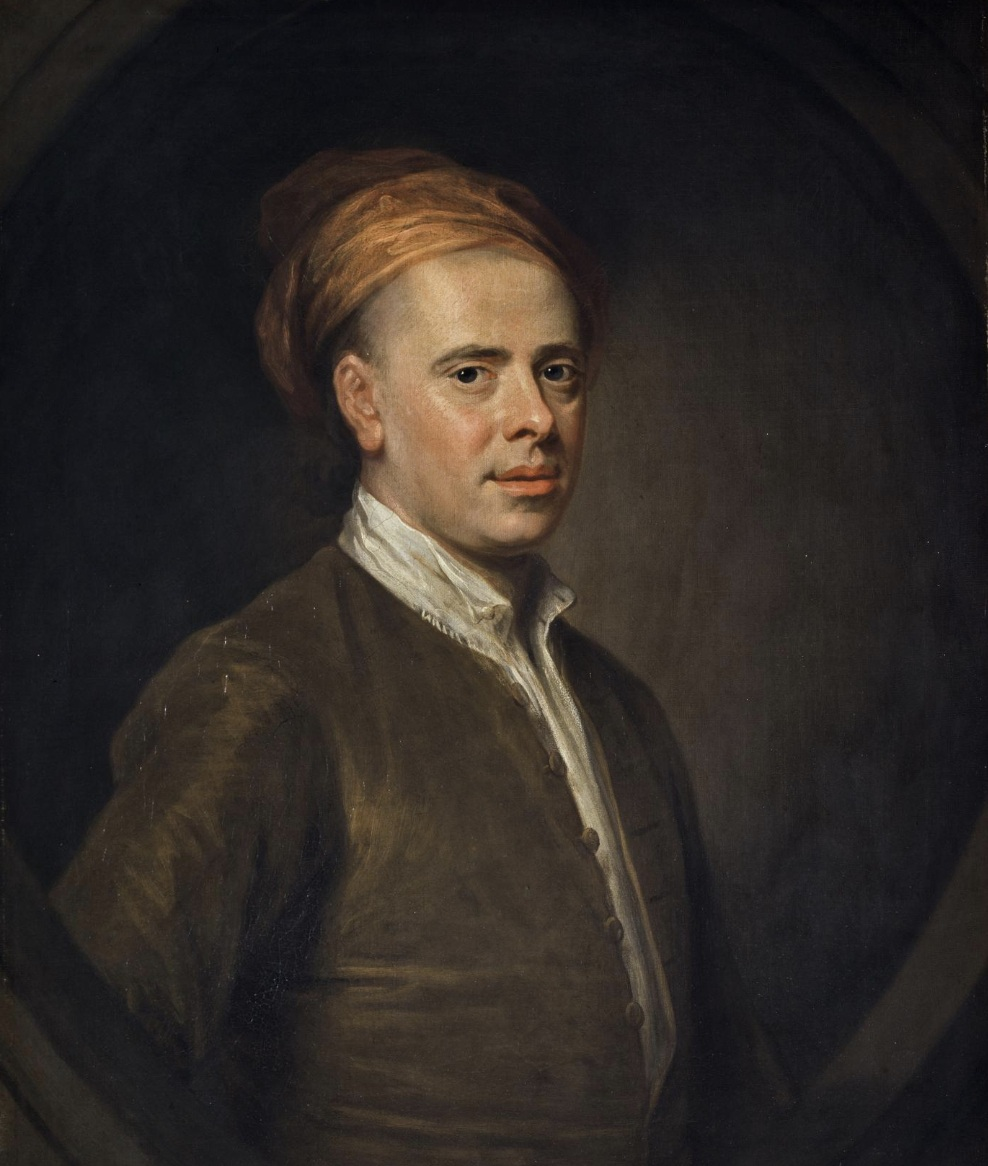
Allan Ramsay, the most influential literary figure in early eighteenth-century Scotland

After the Union in 1707 Scottish literature developed a distinct national identity and began to enjoy an international reputation. Allan Ramsay (1686–1758) was the most important literary figure of the era, often described as leading a "vernacular revival". He laid the foundations of a reawakening of interest in older Scottish literature, publishing The Ever Green (1724), a collection that included many major poetic works of the Stewart period. He led the trend for pastoral poetry, helping to develop the Habbie stanza, which would be later be used by Robert Burns as a poetic form. His Tea-Table Miscellany (1724–37) contained old Scots folk material, his own poems in the folk style and "gentilizings" of Scots poems in the English neo-classical style. Ramsay was part of a community of poets working in Scots and English. These included William Hamilton of Gilbertfield (c. 1665–1751), Robert Crawford (1695–1733), Alexander Ross (1699–1784), the Jacobite William Hamilton of Bangour (1704–54), socialite Alison Rutherford Cockburn (1712–94), and poet and playwright James Thomson (1700–48), most famous for the nature poetry of his Seasons.

The eighteenth century was also a period of innovation in Gaelic vernacular poetry. Major figures included the satirist Rob Donn Mackay (Robert Mackay, 1714–78), the hunter-poet Donnchadh Bàn Mac an t-Saoir (Duncan Ban MacIntyre, 1724–1812) and Uilleam Ross (William Ross, 1762–90), most noted for his anguished love songs. The most significant poet in the language during this era was Alasdair mac Mhaighstir Alasdair (Alasdair MacDonald, c. 1698–1770), who emerged as the Scottish nationalist poet of the Jacobite cause and whose poetry marks a shift away from the Scottish clan-based tradition of both war and praise poetry. His interest in traditional forms can be seen in his immram poem Clanranald's Gallery. He also mixed these traditions with influences from the Lowlands, including Thompson's Seasons, which helped inspire a new form of nature poetry in Gaelic, which was not focused on their relations to human concerns.

James Macpherson (1736–96) was the first Scottish poet to gain an international reputation, by claiming to have collected and translated Gaelic poetry written by the demigod Ossian from the Fenian Cycle of Celtic mythology. Macpherson's published translations immediately acquired international popularity, being proclaimed as a Gaelic equivalent to the Classical epics of Homer and Virgil. Fingal was speedily translated into many European languages, and its deep appreciation of natural beauty and the melancholy tenderness of its treatment of the ancient legends did more than any single work to bring about the Romantic movement in European, and especially in German, literature, influencing Herder and Goethe. Eventually it became clear that the poems were not direct translations from the Gaelic, but were an adaptation made to suit the aesthetic expectations of his audience.

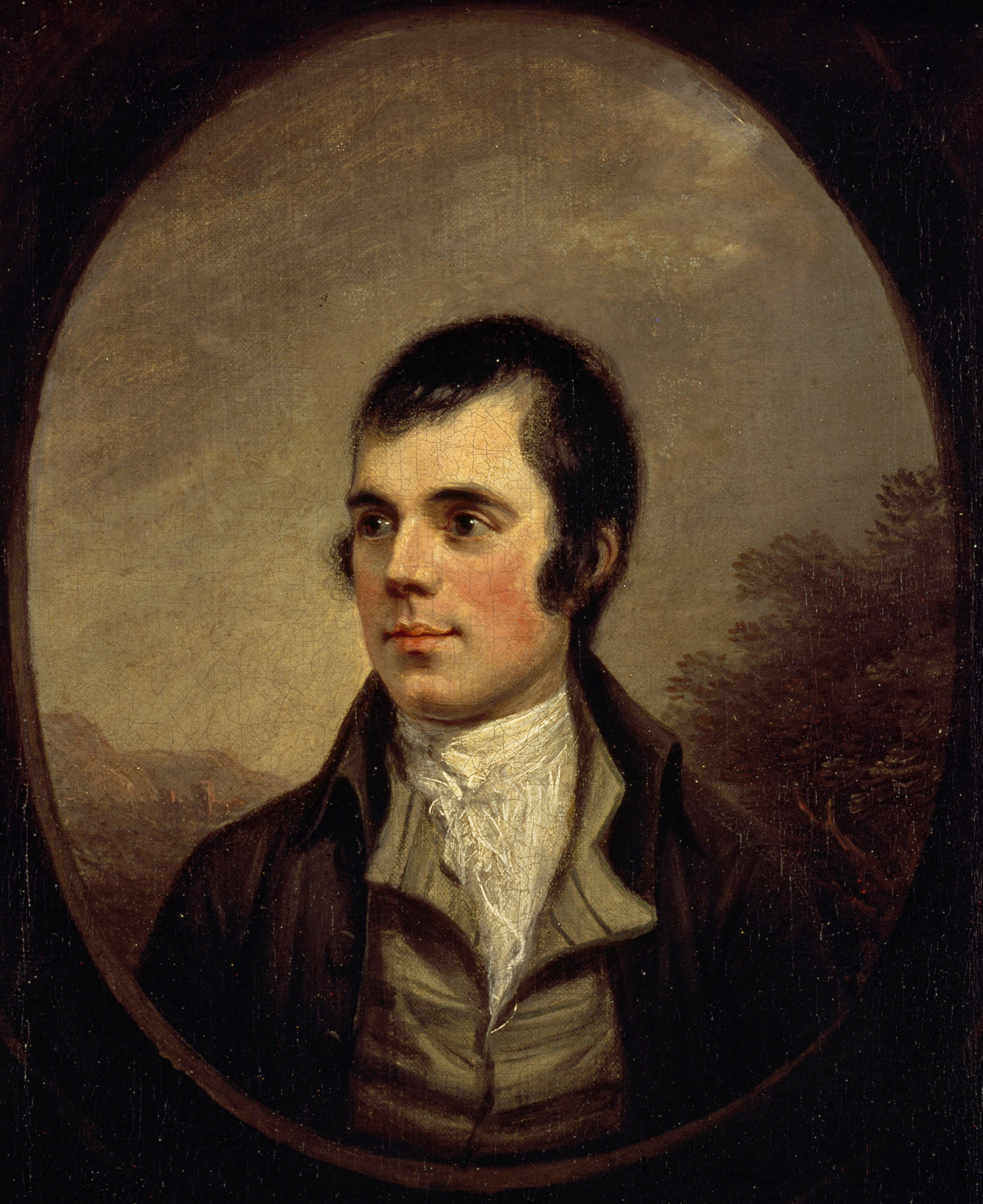
Robert Burns, considered the national poet, in Alexander Nasmyth's portrait of 1787

Before Robert Burns the most important Scottish language poet was Robert Fergusson (1750–74), who also worked in English. His work often celebrated his native Edinburgh, as in his best known poem "Auld Reekie" (1773). Burns (1759–96) was highly influenced by the Ossian cycle. An Ayrshire poet and lyricist, he is widely regarded as the national poet of Scotland and a major figure in the Romantic movement. As well as making original compositions, Burns also collected folk songs from across Scotland, often revising or adapting them. His poem (and song) "Auld Lang Syne" is often sung at Hogmanay (the last day of the year), and "Scots Wha Hae" served for a long time as an unofficial national anthem of the country. Burns's poetry drew upon a substantial familiarity with and knowledge of Classical, Biblical, and English literature, as well as the Scottish Makar tradition. Burns was skilled in writing not only in the Scots language but also in the Scottish English dialect of the English language. Some of his works, such as "Love and Liberty" (also known as "The Jolly Beggars"), are written in both Scots and English for various effects. His themes included republicanism, radicalism, Scottish patriotism, anticlericalism, class inequalities, gender roles, commentary on the Scottish Kirk of his time, Scottish cultural identity, poverty, sexuality, and the beneficial aspects of popular socialising.

Major poets writing in the radical tradition of Burns include Alexander Wilson (1766–1813), whose outspoken views forced him into emigration to the US. Major literary figures connected with Romanticism include the poets James Hogg (1770–1835) and Allan Cunningham (1784–1842). The most important figure in Scottish Romanticism, Walter Scott (1771–1832), began his literary career as a poet, producing medieval revival pieces in English such as "The lay of the last minstrel" (1805), and also collected and published Scottish ballads, before the success of his first prose work, Waverley in 1814, launched his career as a novelist.

== Nineteenth century ==
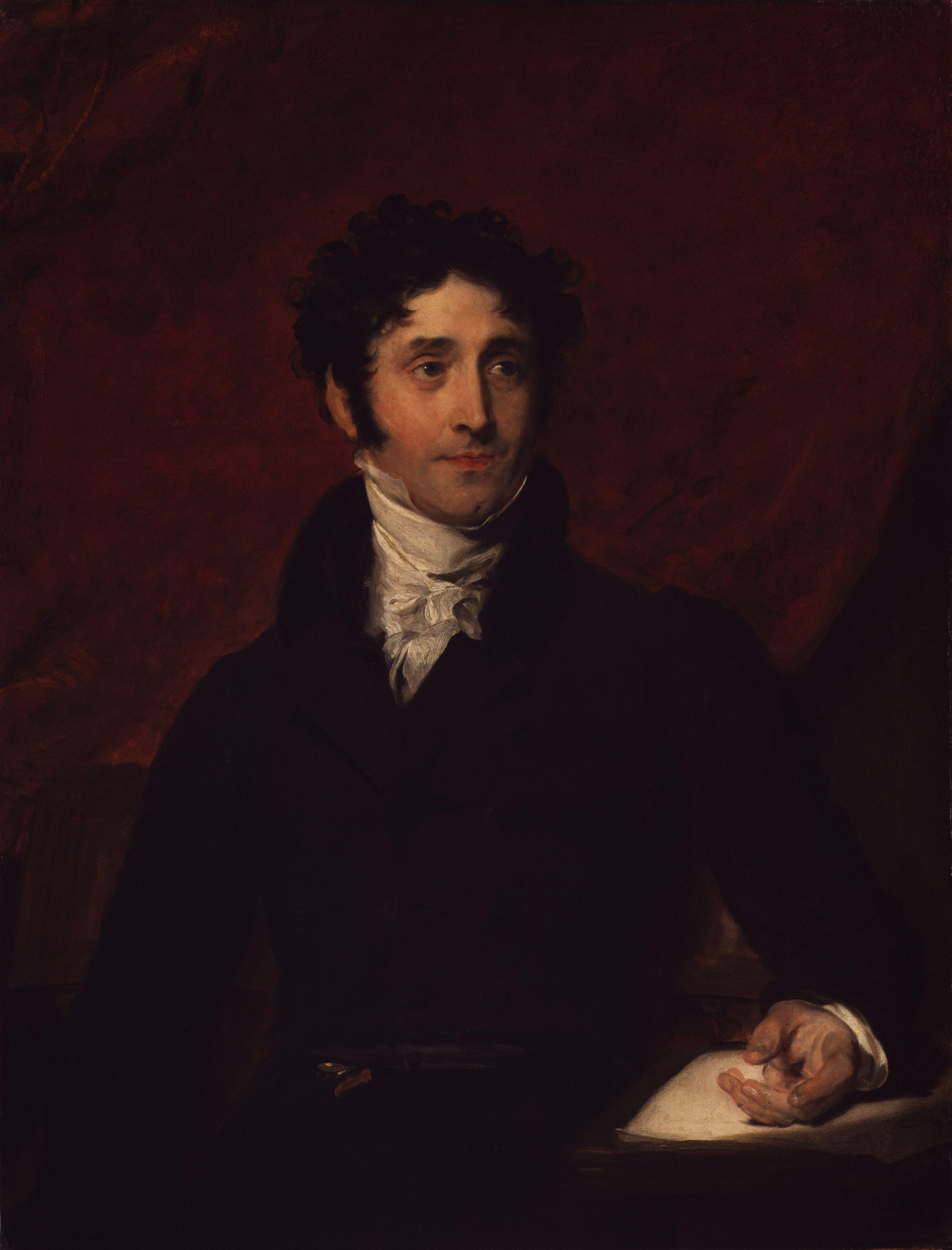
Thomas Campbell, among the most successful Scottish poets of the nineteenth century. Portrait of Thomas Campbell by Thomas Lawrence, 1820

Scottish poetry is often seen as entering a period of decline in the nineteenth century, with Scots language poetry criticised for its use of parochial dialect and English poetry for its lack of Scottishness. The main legacy of Burns were the conservative and anti-radical Burns clubs that sprang up around Scotland, filled with members that praised a sanitised version of Burns and poets who fixated on the "Burns stanza" as a form. William Tennant's (1784–1848) "Anster Fair" (1812) produced a more respectable version of folk revels. Standard critical narratives have seen the descent of Scottish poetry into infantalism as exemplified by the highly popular Whistle Binkie anthologies, which appeared 1830–90 and which notoriously included in one volume "Wee Willie Winkie" by William Miler (1810–72). This tendency has been seen as leading late nineteenth-century Scottish poetry into the sentimental parochialism of the Kailyard school.

However, Scotland continued to produce talented and successful poets. Poets from the lower social orders included the weaver-poet William Thom (1799–1848), whose "A chieftain unknown to the Queen" (1843) combined simple Scots language with a social critique of Queen Victoria's visit to Scotland. From the other end of the social scale Lady Margaret Maclean Clephane Compton Northampton (d. 1830), translated Jacobite verse from the Gaelic and poems by Petrarch and Goethe as well as producing her own original work. Her poem Irene adapts the Spenserian stanza to reflect natural patterns of speech. William Edmondstoune Aytoun (1813–65), eventually appointed Professor of belles lettres at the University of Edinburgh, is best known for The lays of the Scottish Cavaliers and made use of the ballad form in his poems, including Bothwell. Among the most successful Scottish poets was the Glasgow-born Thomas Campbell (1777–1844), whose produced patriotic British songs, including "Ye Mariners of England", a reworking of "Rule Britannia!", and sentimental but powerful epics on contemporary events, including Gertrude of Wyoming. His works were extensively reprinted in the period 1800–60.

Among the most influential poets of the later nineteenth century that rejected the limitations of Kailyard School were James Thomson (1834–82), whose most famous poem "City of Dreadful Night" broke many of the conventions of nineteenth-century poetry and John Davidson (1857–1909), whose work, including "The Runable Stag" and "Thirty Bob a Week" were much anthologised, would have a major impact on modernist poets including Hugh MacDiarmid, Wallace Stevens and T. S. Eliot.

The Highland Clearances and widespread emigration significantly weakened Gaelic language and culture and had a profound impact on the nature of Gaelic poetry. The theme of homeland became prominent. The best poetry in this vein contained a strong element of protest, including William Livingston (poet) (Uilleam Macdhunleibhe) (1808–70) protest against the Islay clearances in "Fios Thun a' Bhard" ("A Message for the Poet") and Seonaidh Phàdraig Iarsiadair's (John Smith, 1848–81) long emotional condemnation of those responsible for the clearances Spiord a' Charthannais. The best known Gaelic poet of the era was Màiri Mhòr nan Óran (Mary MacPherson, 1821–98), whose verse was criticised for a lack of intellectual weight, but which embodies the spirit of the land agitation of the 1870s and 1880s and whose evocation of place and mood has made her among the most enduring Gaelic poets.

== Twentieth century to the present ==
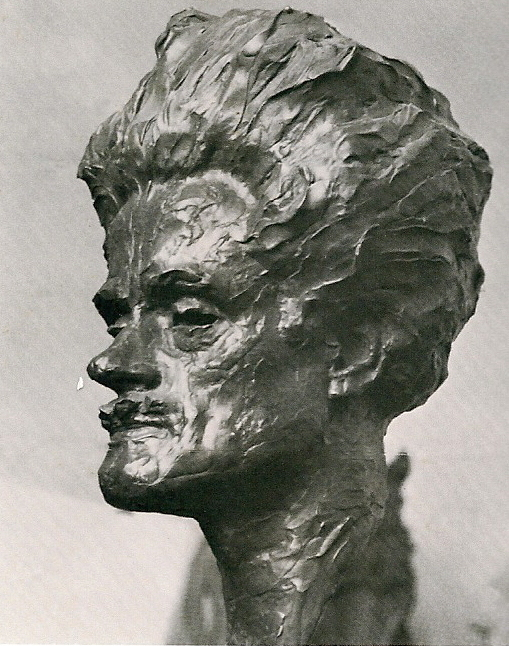
A bust of Hugh MacDiarmid sculpted in 1927 by William Lamb

In the early twentieth century there was a new surge of activity in Scottish literature, influenced by modernism and resurgent nationalism, known as the Scottish Renaissance. The leading figure in the movement was Hugh MacDiarmid (the pseudonym of Christopher Murray Grieve, 1892–1978). MacDiarmid attempted to revive the Scots language as a medium for serious literature in poetic works including "A Drunk Man Looks at the Thistle" (1936), developing a form of Synthetic Scots that combined different regional dialects and archaic terms. Other writers that emerged in this period, and are often treated as part of the movement, include the poets Edwin Muir (1887–1959) and William Soutar (1898–1943), who pursued an exploration of identity, rejecting nostalgia and parochialism and engaging with social and political issues. Some writers that emerged after the Second World War followed MacDiarmid by writing in Scots, including Robert Garioch (1909–81) and Sydney Goodsir Smith (1915–75). Others demonstrated a greater interest in English language poetry, among them Norman MacCaig (1910–96), George Bruce (1909–2002) and Maurice Lindsay (1918–2009). George Mackay Brown (1921–96) from Orkney, wrote both poetry and prose fiction shaped by his distinctive island background. The Glaswegian poet Edwin Morgan (1920–2010) became known for translations of works from a wide range of European languages. He was also the first Scots Makar (the official national poet), appointed by the inaugural Scottish government in 2004.

The parallel revitalisation of Gaelic poetry, known as the Scottish Gaelic Renaissance was largely due to the work of Sorley Maclean (Somhairle MacGill-Eain, 1911–96). A native of Skye and a native Gaelic speaker, he abandoned the stylistic conventions of the tradition and opened up new possibilities for composition with his poem Dàin do Eimhir (Poems to Eimhir, 1943). His work inspired a new generation to take up nea bhardachd (the new poetry). These included George Campbell Hay (Deòrsa Mac Iain Dheòrsa, 1915–84), Lewis-born poets Derick Thomson (Ruaraidh MacThòmais, 1921–2012) and Iain Crichton Smith (Iain Mac a' Ghobhainn, 1928–98). They all focused on the issues of exile, the fate of the Gaelic language and bi-culturalism.

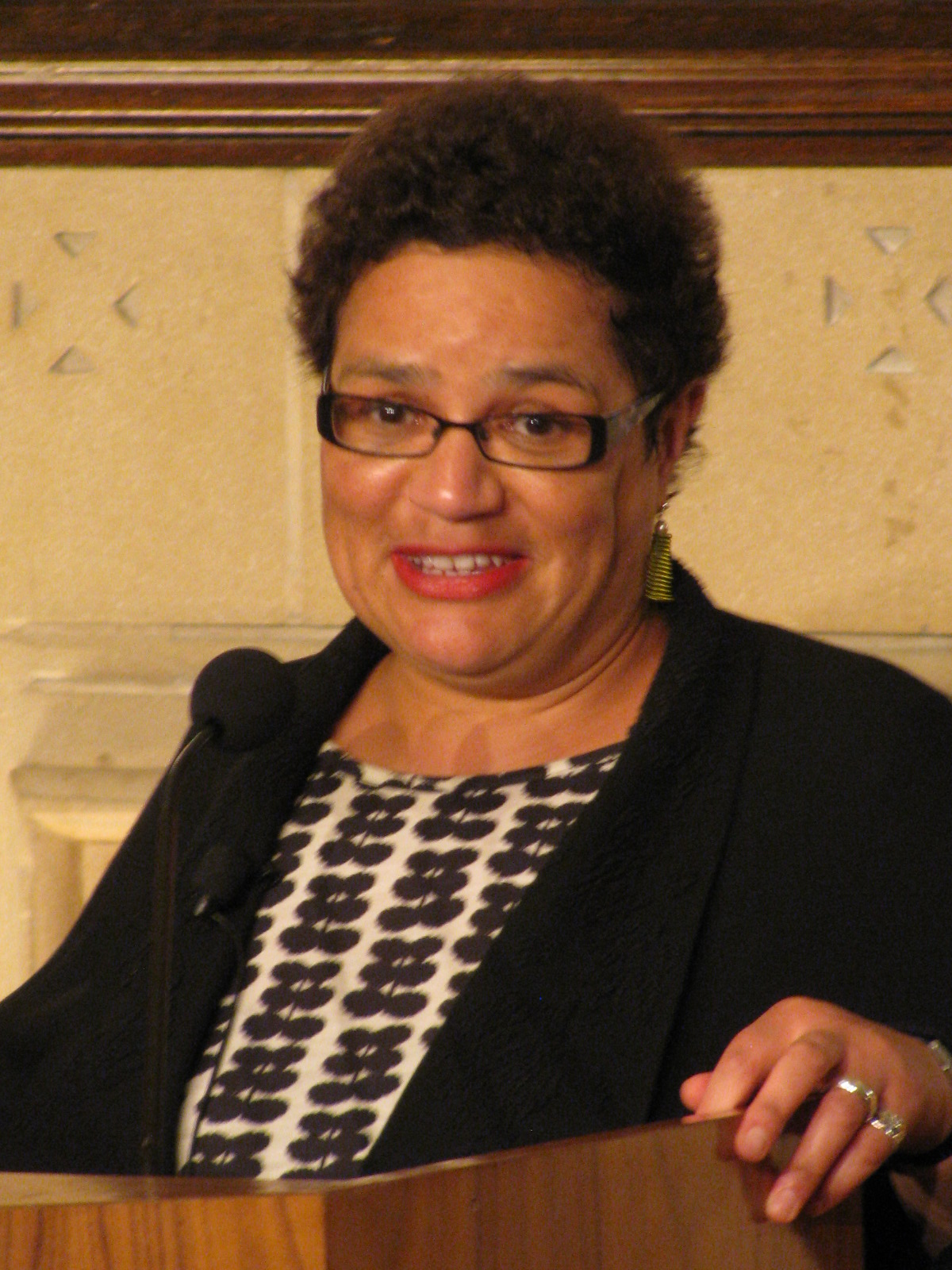
Poet and novelist Jackie Kay

The mid-twentieth century also saw some much acclaimed poetry being written in Esperanto by what would become known as the "Skota Skolo" (Scottish School), which included William Auld (1924–2006), John Dinwoodie (1904–80), Reto Rossetti (1909–94), and John Francis (1924–2012). Influenced by the Hungarian poet Kálmán Kalocsay (1891–1976), they published an important collection, Kvaropo, together in 1952. Inspired in part by the Cantos of American poet Ezra Pound, Auld would publish La infana raso in 1956, widely regarded as one of the most important literary works in the language, for which he was nominated for the Nobel Prize for Literature on three occasions, the first esperantist to be nominated.

The generation of poets that grew up in the postwar period included Douglas Dunn (b. 1942), whose work has often seen a coming to terms with class and national identity within the formal structures of poetry and commenting on contemporary events, as in Barbarians (1979) and Northlight (1988). His most personal work is contained in the collection of Elegies (1985), which deal with the death of his first wife from cancer. Tom Leonard (b. 1944), works in the Glaswegian dialect, pioneering the working class voice in Scottish poetry, although what has been described as his finest work "A priest came on at Merkland Street" is in English. Like his friend Leonard, Aonghas MacNeacail (Angus Nicolson, b. 1942), amongst the most prominent post-war Gaelic poets, was influenced by new American poetry, particularly the Black Mountain School. Liz Lochhead (b. 1947) also explored the lives of working-class people of Glasgow, but added an appreciation of female voices within a sometimes male dominated society. The 1980s and 1990s saw the emergence of a new generation of Scottish poets that became leading figures on the UK stage, including Don Paterson (b. 1953), Robert Crawford (b. 1959), Carol Ann Duffy (b. 1955), Kathleen Jamie (b. 1962) and Jackie Kay (b. 1961). Dundonians Paterson and Crawford have both produced esoteric work, which includes Paterson's ironically self-aware verse and Crawford's a metaphorically colourful re-imagining of Scottish history. Kathleen Jamie has explored female aspirations, drawing on her experiences growing up in rural Renfrewshire and Jackie Kay has drawn on her experiences as a black child adopted by a working class Glasgow family. Glasgow-born Duffy was named as Poet Laureate in May 2009, the first woman, the first Scot and the first openly gay poet to take the post.
