= James Forbes (portrait painter) =

Scottish portrait painter (1797–1881)

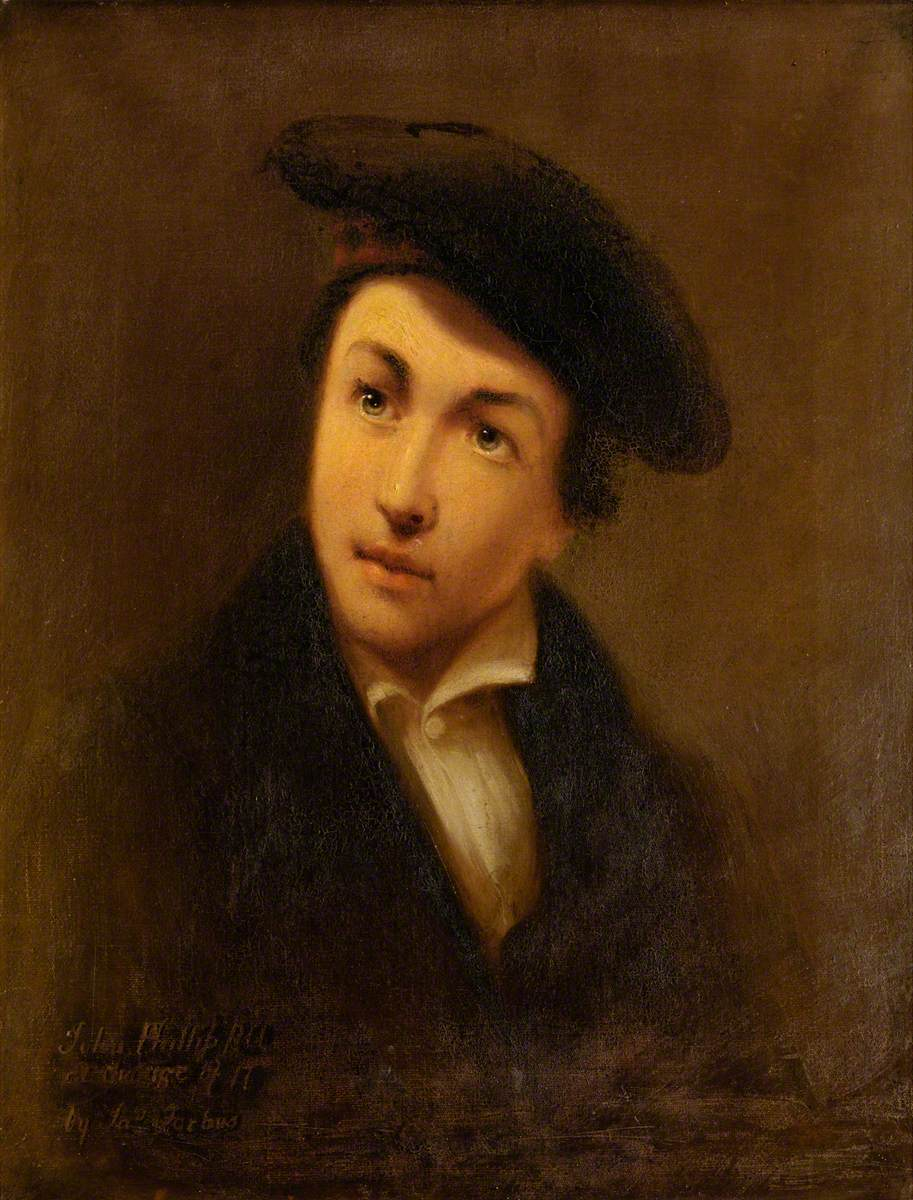
Portrait of his student, John Phillip

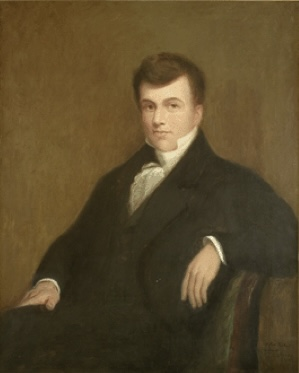
Portrait of Jonathan Jennings

James Forbes (1 October 1797, Peterhead, Scotland – 25 March 1881, Plainwell, Michigan) was a Scottish portrait painter who later moved to and worked in the United States.

== Biography ==
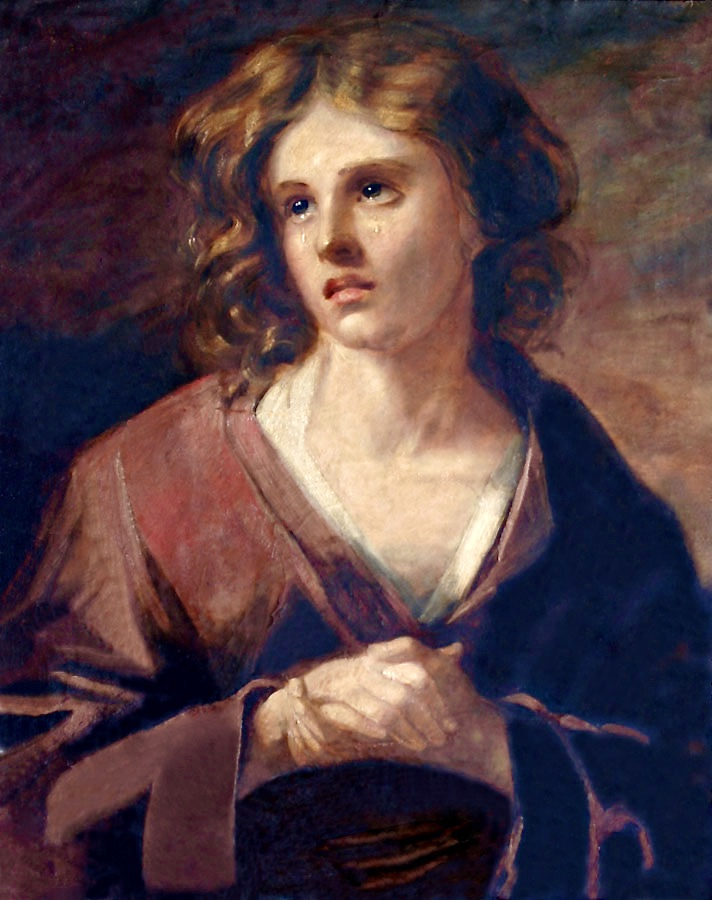
Painted in 1828 - a girl came to 'Invernettie' - the home of James Forbes to beg. He asked the girl if she might be willing to sit for a portrait. Forbes asked the girl to drape her red skirt around her shoulders to highlight her face. (The painting was originally advertised for sale for 3 pounds).

His artistic education is not a matter of record. He originally worked in Aberdeen, where he was also an art teacher. John Phillip was among his best known students. In 1824, he married Mary Waters (1797–1853). They had eight children. Their eldest, Mary Forbes, also became a portrait painter.

He produced numerous portraits of famous men in that area of Scotland, including the poet William Thom and the folklorist Peter Buchan. During the 1850s, he exhibited at the Royal Scottish Academy, the Royal Academy in London and the British Institution.

In 1859, despite his great success there, he and his six surviving children emigrated to the United States and settled in Chicago. He is believed to have left there sometime in 1868, although there is evidence that he maintained a studio that was destroyed in the Great Chicago Fire. Either way, he seems to have been induced to relocate to Indiana by his friendship with Col. Henry F. Blount (1829–1917), who owned a plow factory in Evansville and may have been a source for commissions.

== Works ==
His first portrait was of Mayor William H. Baker (1813–1872), which led to a meeting with Governor Conrad Baker, the Mayor's brother. This resulted in a commission to paint official portraits of six Indiana Governors; three posthumous (Jonathan Jennings, Ratliff Boon and James Whitcomb), three from life (Baker, Paris Dunning and Oliver Morton).

Later, he bought a farm near Kalamazoo from his brother John, where he lived with his daughter Mary and her husband William until his death in 1881.
