= William Hamilton (comic poet) =

Scottish poet

William Hamilton (c.1665 – 24 May 1751) was a Scottish poet. He wrote comic, mock-tragic poetry such as "The Last Dying Words of Bonny Heck": a once-champion hare coursing greyhound in the East Neuk of Fife who was about to be hanged, for growing too slow. It is written in anglified Scots, with a sprightly narrative and wry comic touches.

== Life ==
Hamilton was born in Ladyland, Ayr (now North Ayrshire), Scotland. In the Familiar Epistles he exchanged with Allan Ramsay, he modestly acknowledges the limitations of his own muse. Ramsay singles out Heck as he suggests there is room for all sorts in poetry. Ramsay's Epistles in return are certainly more skillful, more self-consciously Scots and with lots more allusions to other authors, Ancient and Modern, but they are consequently, less direct than those of Hamilton. Another of Hamilton's poems, Willie was a Wanton Wag, - about a young man who appears at a wedding feast, and enraptures bride and bridesmaids by his "leg" at dancing - appeared in Ramsay's Tea-Table Miscellany.

The references in the Familiar Epistles to their delight in drinking in the taverns of Edinburgh, and references to thinly disguised mutual acquaintances, point up how well Hamilton was integrated into the literary world of the capital. He is praised by Burns in one of his poems. In his Epistle to William Simpson, Burns mentions Ramsay, Gilbertfield and Fergusson, as poets in whose company fame would be a pleasure.

My senses wad be in a creel

Should I but dare a hope to speel
Wi’ Allan, or wi Gilbertfield,
The braes o fame;
Or Fergusson, the writer chiel

A deathless name.

Hamilton tried his hand at epic poetry in an abridgment in 18th century English of Blind Harry's The Actes and Deidis of the Illustre and Vallyeant Campioun Schir William Wallace.

"...wherein the Old, obsolete words are rendered more intelligible and adapted to the understanding of such who have not leisure to study the Meaning and Import of such Parases (sic) without the aid of a Glossary."

This enthused the young Burns, who records, in his Autobiographical Letter, that it

"...poured a Scottish prejudice in my veins which will boil along there till the flood gates of life shut in eternal rest."

He also served in the army and retired with the rank of Lieutenant.

== Sources ==
- Duncan Glen Four Scottish Poets of Cambuslang and Dechmont Hill 1626-1990: Patrick Hamilton, Minister at Cambuslang 1626-1645; Lieutenant William Hamilton of Gilbertfield, ... (Paperback) Akros Publications (Mar 1996) ISBN 0-86142-062-4
- See the online Burns Encyclopaedia in
- Bayne, Thomas Wilson (1890). "Hamilton, William (1665?-1751)" . In Stephen, Leslie; Lee, Sidney (eds.). Dictionary of National Biography. Vol. 24. London: Smith, Elder & Co.
