= William Hamilton (Jacobite poet) =

Scottish poet

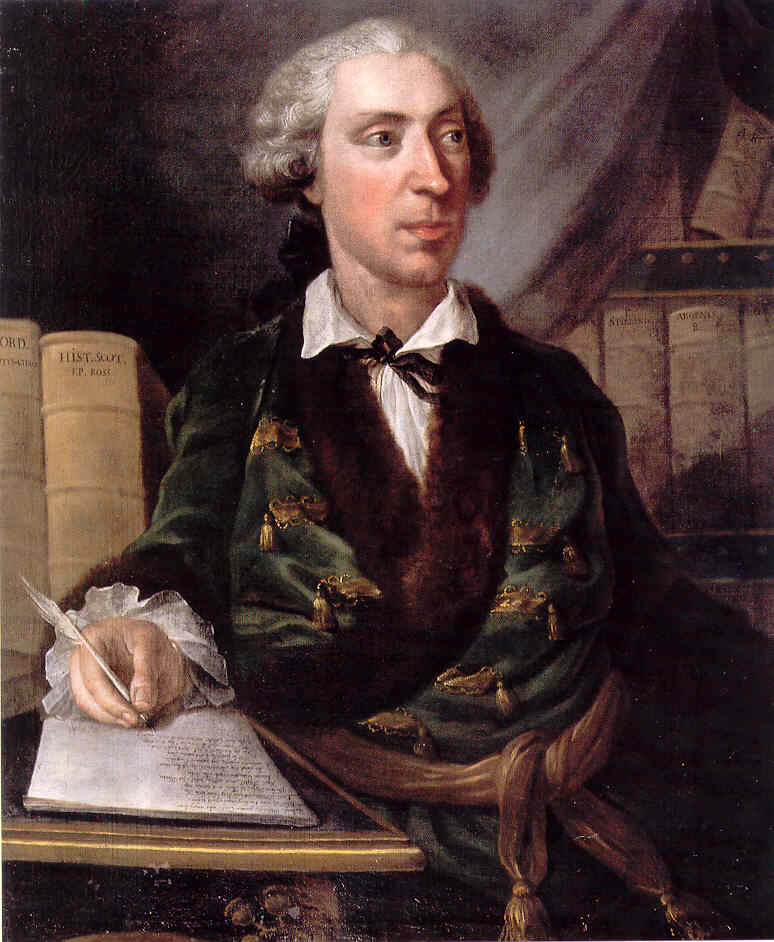
- Born: 1704; Ecclesmachan, West Lothian
- Died: 25 March 1754; Lyon
- Resting place: Abbey Church, Holyrood
- Writing career
- Language: English
- Genre: Poetry

William Hamilton (1704–1754) was a Scottish poet associated with the Jacobite movement.

== Life ==
Hamilton was born at the family seat in Ecclesmachan, West Lothian. He was the second son of James Hamilton of Bangour, advocate, whose grandfather, James, second son of John Hamilton of Little Earnock, Lanarkshire, founded the Bangour family. On the death of his elder brother, without heir, in 1750, Hamilton succeeded to the estate.

His naturally delicate constitution, as well as his tastes, had all along prevented him from going much into fashionable society, and from his early years he started writing poetry, receiving ready commendation from his friends. Between 1724 and 1727, he contributed lyrics to Allan Ramsay's Tea Table Miscellany, and he showed a practical interest in the success of the Gentle Shepherd. This poem is dedicated, 25 June 1725, to the beautiful and much admired Susanna Montgomery, Countess of Eglinton, whose favourable consideration of Ramsay's merits is further solicited by Hamilton in a set of spirited heroic couplets following the dedication. The poet's ardour in his love-songs led, at least in one case, to a feeling of resentment on the part of a lady, who consulted his close friend Henry Home, Lord Kames in her dilemma, and, acting on his advice to profess a return of affection, quickly startled Hamilton into an attitude of distant reserve.

Heartily espousing the cause of the Stuarts, Hamilton in his Gladsmuir celebrated the Jacobite victory at Prestonpans. After Culloden he was for a time in hiding in the highlands, and A Soliloquy wrote in June 1746 is charged with a deep feeling of his troubles. Ultimately he succeeded along with others in reaching France. On the intercession of influential friends, he was allowed to return to Scotland, but the great strain had deeply affected his weak constitution, and he found it impossible to remain at home. His last days were spent at Lyons, where he died of consumption [now called tuberculosis], 25 March 1754. His body was brought to Scotland, and buried in the Abbey Church, Holyrood.

== Family ==
Hamilton was twice married, and James, his son by his first wife, a daughter of Sir James Hall, 2nd bart.of Dunglass, succeeded to the estate.
