= Alexander Ross (poet) =

Scottish poet

- Born: April 13, 1699; Aberdeenshire
- Died: May 20, 1784 (aged 85); Lochlee, Glen Esk, Angus
- Occupations: teacher, poet
- Known for: Helenore, or the Fortunate Shepherdess

Alexander Ross (13 April 1699 – 20 May 1784) was a Scottish poet.

== Biography ==
Alexander Ross was born to a farming family at Torphins in Aberdeenshire. He was educated at Marischal College, Aberdeen and worked as private tutor for the children of Sir William Forbes of Craigievar. In 1732 he became a headmaster in Lochlee, Angus, where he would live until his death in 1784. He had been in the habit of writing verse for his own amusement when, in 1768, at the suggestion of James Beattie, he published Helenore, or the Fortunate Shepherdess.

Ross was an admirer of the 16th Century makar Alexander Montgomerie and in around 1753 he composed a poem entitled "A Dream in Imitation of the Cherrie and the Slae" which has never been published.

A memorial was erected in his honour c. 1854 in the old churchyard of Lochlee in Glen Esk, Angus, where he is buried.

== Reputation ==
Robert Burns praised Alexander Ross, writing "There is I know not what of wild happiness of thought and expression peculiarly beautiful in the old Scottish song style, of which his Grace, old venerable Skinner, the author of Tullochgorum etc., and the late Ross at Lochlee, of true Scottish poetic memory, are the only modern instances that I recollect, since Ramsay, with his contemporaries, and poor Bob Fergusson, went to the world of deathless existence and truly immortal song."
