= John Rolland =

Scottish poet and priest (fl. 1560)

John Rolland (fl. 1560), Scottish poet, appears to have been a priest of the diocese of Glasgow, and to have been known in Dalkeith in 1555.

He is the author of two poems, the Court of Venus and a translation of the Seven Wise Masters. The former, which was printed by John Ros in 1575, may have been written before 1560. The latter was translated from a Scots prose version at the suggestion of an aunt ("ane proper wenche"), who had found his treatment of the courtly allegory involved and uninteresting.

The Court of Venus was edited by Walter Gregor for the S.T.S. in 1884. See W. A. Craigie's long list of corrections of that edition in the Modern Language Quarterly (March 1898).

In The Allegory of Love (1936), C. S. Lewis refers to Rolland as "a very minor poet" but credits him with "truly allegorical power", and particularly points to the tournament scene in Book 4 of Court of Venus which, "when once its significacio has been seen, can hardly be quoted without indecorum", that is, it has a sexual meaning. He adds that the poem displays a "peculiarly Scottish and medieval blend of gallantry, satire, fantasy, and pedantry".

The Seven Sages was printed in 1578, and frequently during the earlier decades of the 17th century. It was reprinted by David Laing for the Bannatyne Club (1837).

Robert Sibbald, in his Chronicle of Scottish Poetry (iii. 287), hinted that Rolland may be the author of the Thrie Priestis of Peblis though no other evidence has been found to support this claim.
