= William Thom (poet) =

Scottish poet

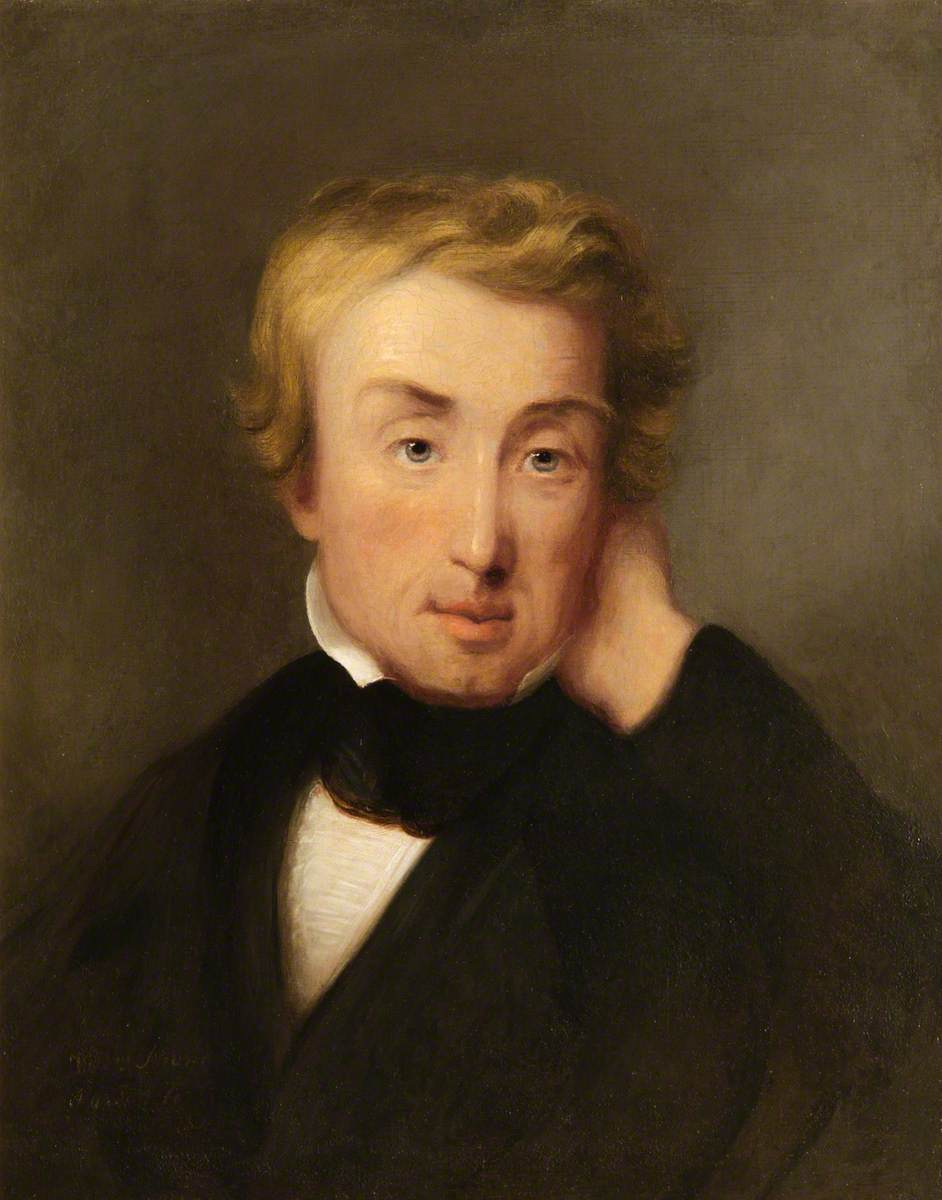
William Thom; portrait by James Forbes

William Thom (1788 – 29 February 1848) was a Scottish poet who wrote in the Scots language. He was author of The Mitherless Bairn and other works. He was known as the "Inverury Poet".

== Life and work ==
Thom was a native of Aberdeen, where he worked as a handloom weaver, enduring considerable hardship and poverty.

He was born in Sinclair's Close, Justice Port, Aberdeen, in 1799 or 1800. His mother was a widow. He was educated at a school run by Elspet Davie before becoming apprenticed as a weaver. At the age of fourteen, he began work at the School Hill Mill, where he was employed until 1830. He sang in his workplace, and some of his early poems were published in the Aberdeen Herald, Aberdeen Journal and Whistle-Binkie.

By 1837 he was working in Newtyle in Angus, but a trade slump resulted in him losing his job. With his family, he walked to Aberdeen in search of work, his daughter Jeanie dying in a farm outhouse on the way. After a year in Aberdeen, the family moved to Inverurie, where Thom found employment as a 'customary weaver'. His partner, Jean Whitecross, died there in childbirth in 1840.

His most notable work is Blind Boy's Pranks. In 1841, with the encouragement of Robert Chambers, he published Rhymes and Recollections of a Handloom Weaver. Further editions were published in 1845, 1847 and 1880.

In 1844, Thom travelled to London to prepare the second edition of his book, remaining there until 1847. During his time in the city he was fêted in literary and Chartist circles. In February 1845, a celebratory dinner was held in his honour at the Crown and Anchor in the Strand. He developed a friendship with the journalist George Julian Harney and was a guest at Chartist social gatherings.

Thom's health deteriorated in the two years before his death. He returned to Scotland in December 1847 and died in Dundee on 29 February 1848. According to the death record on the site scotlandspeople.gov.uk, Thom died of "consumption" and was interred on 3 March. He is interred at Western Cemetery, Dundee, where a memorial monument was erected by admirers of the poet.

A biography of Thom appears in the book James Hogg by Sir George Douglas (Edinburgh: Oliphant, Anderson & Ferrier, 1899) in the Famous Scots Series.
