= William Miller (poet) =

Scottish poet

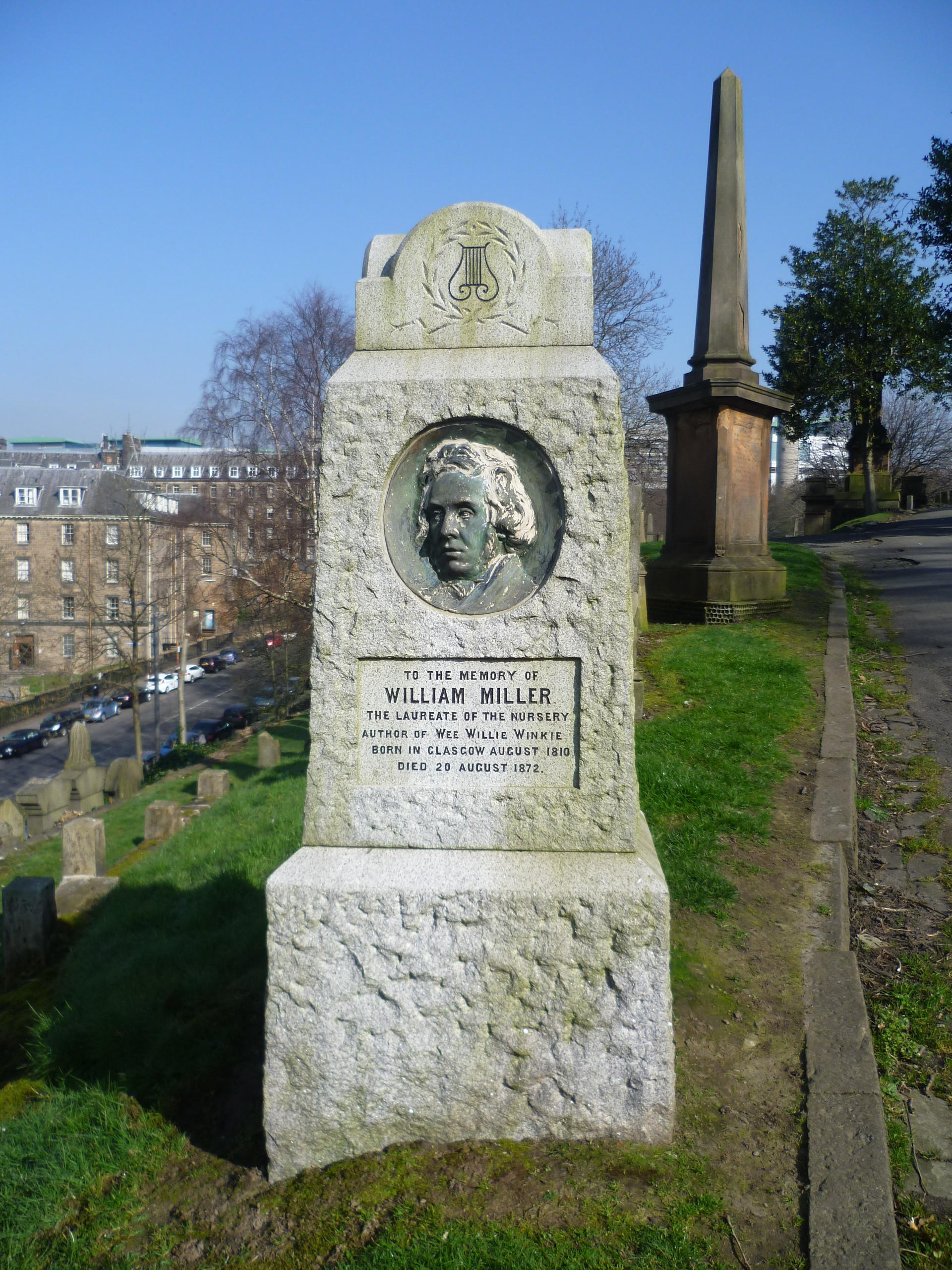
Miller Memorial on the Glasgow Necropolis

William Miller (August 1810 – 20 August 1872) was a Scottish poet best known for the nursery rhyme Wee Willie Winkie.

Miller, known as "The Laureate of the Nursery", was born in Glasgow and lived in Dennistoun, Scotland. He suffered from ill health and was unable to become a surgeon and instead took up woodturning and cabinet making. At the same time he began writing poetry and children's rhymes, mainly in the Scots language. His poetry was published in various works including the Whistle-binkie books.

In 1842, Whistle-binkie: Stories for the Fireside was published and contained the rhyme Wee Willie Winkie. The poem would go on to become known in other countries, in translation, and made Miller famous at the time. In 1871, Miller's leg became ulcerated and he had to retire from cabinet making. The leg became infected and led to his death in 1872 aged 62. By then Miller was destitute and was buried at Tollcross. Later a memorial to Miller was erected on the Glasgow Necropolis.
