= George Clapperton =

16th c. Scottish nobleman and poet

George Clapperton was a Scottish nobleman, vernacular poet, and a patron of the Bannatyne Manuscript living in the 1500s.

== Biography ==
Clapperton worked in the Chapel Royal from 1535 to 1574 after being put forward to the subdeanery. Clapperton was named as the provost of Trinity College in 1540 following the death of James Kincragy. Due to his connections with both Trinity college and the Chapel Royal he benefitted from his position with royals. Clapperton took on a number of roles outside of his work with Trinity College and the Chapel Royal including being the titular vicar of Wemyss, a parson of Kirkinner, and an almoner to the King, a position which he maintained from 1538 until 1542 when James V died. Clapperton's connection to the Bannatyne Manuscript stems from his presentation to the subdeanery of the Chapel Royal. Clapperton's connection with royalty is consistent with much of the Bannatyne connections. Clapperton's name is included among a number of influential names in Scottish literature in George Bannatyne's 'Memoriall Buik'.

== Works ==
Clapperton's poem "Wa worth marriage" is included in the Maitland Folio, identifying him as a vernacular poet.

== See also ==
- Bannatyne Manuscript
- George Bannatyne
