= John Barleycorn =

English/Scottish folk song

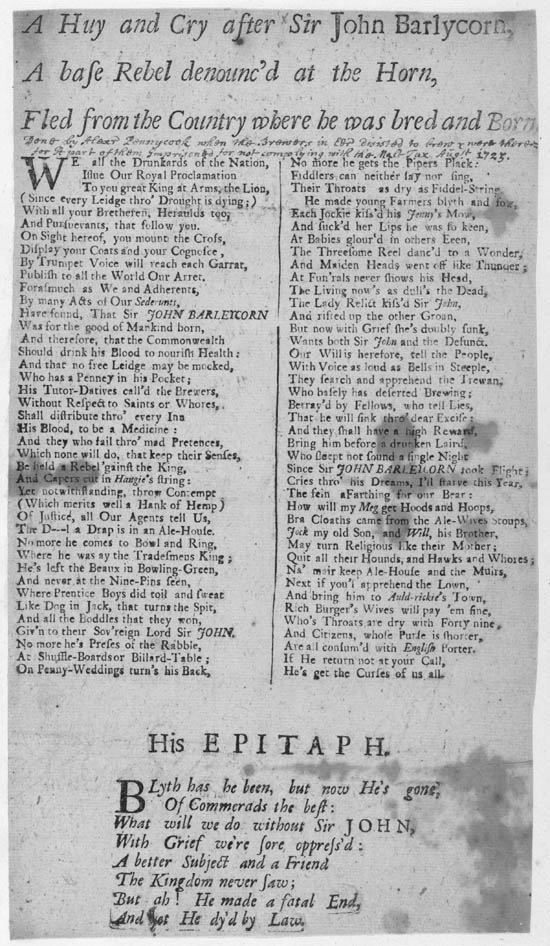
Broadside ballad titled "A Huy and Cry After Sir John Barlycorn" by Alexander Pennecuik, 1725

"John Barleycorn" is an English and Scottish folk song. The song's protagonist is John Barleycorn, a personification of barley and of the beer made from it. In the song, he suffers indignities, attacks, and death that correspond to the various stages of barley cultivation, such as reaping and malting.

The song may have its origins in ancient English or Scottish folklore, with written evidence of the song dating it at least as far back as the Elizabethan era. It is listed as number 164 in the Roud Folk Song Index. The oldest versions are Scottish and include the Scots poem "Quhy Sowld Nocht Allane Honorit Be". In 1782, the Scottish poet Robert Burns published his own version of the song, which influenced subsequent versions.

The song survived into the twentieth century in the oral folk tradition, primarily in England, and many popular folk revival artists have recorded versions of the song. In most traditional versions, including the sixteenth century Scottish version titled Alan-a-Maut, the plant's ill-treatment by humans and its re-emergence as beer to take its revenge are key themes.

== History ==
=== Possible ancient origins ===
The Penguin Book of English Folk Songs (London, 1959), edited by the folk singer A. L. Lloyd and the composer Ralph Vaughan Williams, ponders whether the ballad is "an unusually coherent folklore survival" or "the creation of an antiquarian revivalist, which has passed into popular currency and become 'folklorised'". It has been theorised that the figure could have some relation to the semi-mythical wicker man ritual, which involves burning a man in effigy.

A link between the mythical figure Beowa (a figure from Anglo-Saxon paganism, appearing in early Anglo-Saxon royal genealogies; his name means "barley") and John Barleycorn is suggested by the author Kathleen Herbert. In her 1994 book Looking for the Lost Gods of England, she suggests that Beowa and Barleycorn are one and the same, noting that the folksong details the suffering, death, and resurrection of Barleycorn, yet celebrates the "reviving effects of drinking his blood".

=== Written versions ===
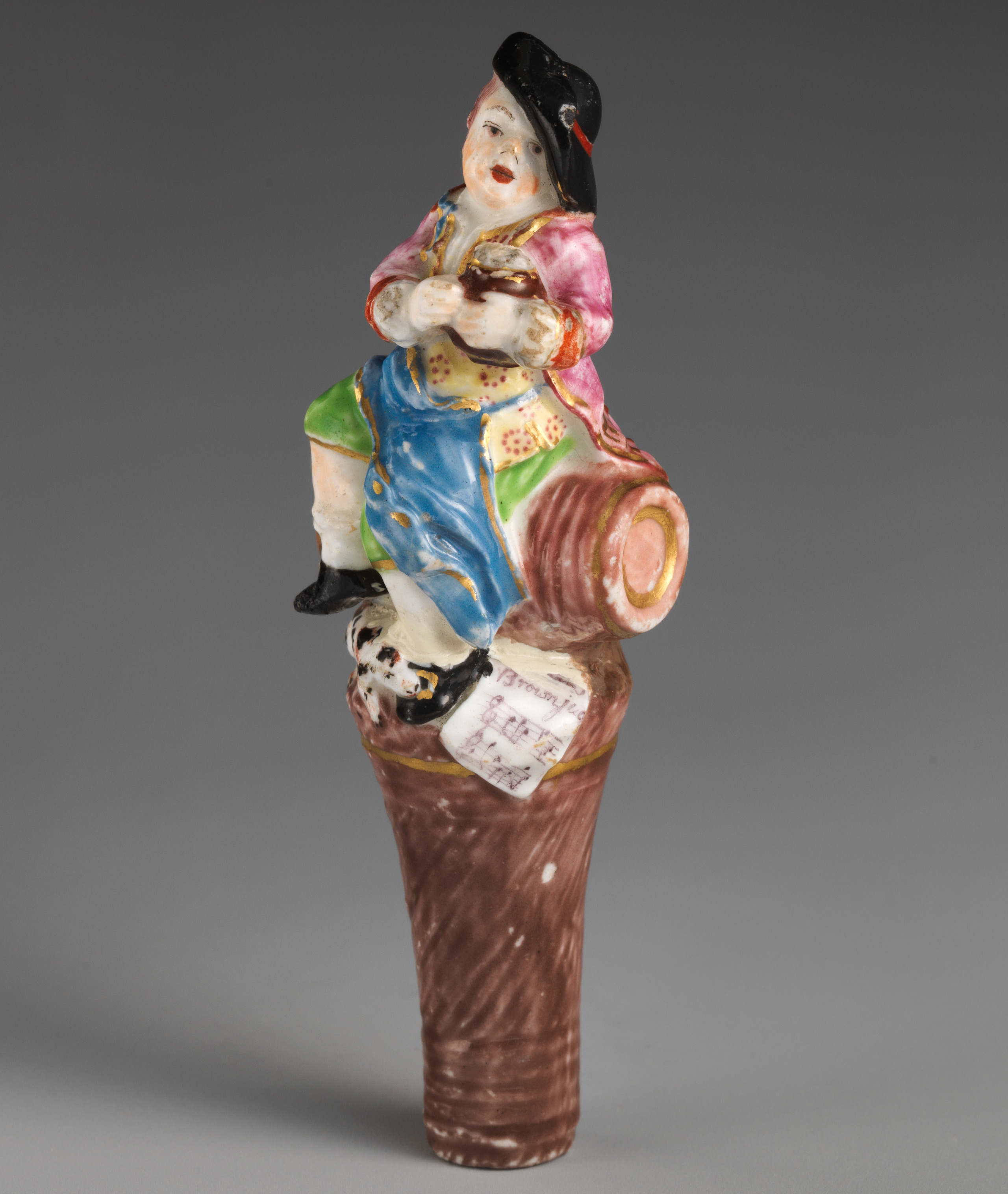
Porcelain image of John Barleycorn, c .1761

The first song to personify Barley was called Allan-a-Maut ('Alan of the malt'), a Scottish song written prior to 1568.

Allan is also the subject of "Quhy Sowld Nocht Allane Honorit Be", a fifteenth or sixteenth century Scots poem included in the Bannatyne Manuscript of 1568 and 17th century English broadsides.

==== "A Pleasant New Ballad" (1624) ====
The first mention of "John Barleycorn" as the character was in a 1624 London broadside, in which he was introduced as "A Pleasant New Ballad to sing Evening and morn, / Of the Bloody murder of Sir John Barley-corn". The following two verses are from this 1624 version:

Yestreen, I heard a pleasant greeting
A pleasant toy and full of joy, two noblemen were meeting
And as they walked for to sport, upon a summer's day,
Then with another nobleman, they went to make affray

Whose names was Sir John Barleycorn, he dwelt down in a dale,
Who had a kinsman lived nearby, they called him Thomas Good Ale,
Another named Richard Beer, was ready at that time,
Another worthy knight was there, called Sir William White Wine.

The final two verses of this 1624 version show Barleycorn's vengeance through intoxicating his killers:

When Sir John Goodale he came with mickle might
Then he took their tongues away, their legs or else their sight
And thus Sir John in each respect, so paid them all their hire
That some lay sleeping by the way, some tumbling in the mire

Some lay groaning by the walls, some in the streets downright,
The best of them did scarcely know, what they had done oernight
All you good wives that brew good ale, God turn from you all teen
But if you put too much liquor in, the Devil put out your een.

==== Robert Burns (1782) ====
Robert Burns published his own version in 1782, which adds a more mysterious undertone and became the model for most subsequent versions of the ballad. Burns's version begins:

There was three kings unto the east,
Three kings both great and high,
And they hae sworn a solemn oath
John Barleycorn should die.

They took a plough and plough'd him down,
Put clods upon his head,
And they hae sworn a solemn oath
John Barleycorn was dead.

Unlike other versions, Robert Burns makes John Barleycorn into a saviour:

And they hae taen his very heart's blood,
And drank it round and round;
And still the more and more they drank,
Their joy did more abound.

John Barleycorn was a hero bold,
Of noble enterprise;
For if you do but taste his blood,
'Twill make your courage rise.

'Twill make a man forget his woe;
'Twill heighten all his joy;
'Twill make the widow's heart to sing,
Tho' the tear were in her eye.

Then let us toast John Barleycorn,
Each man a glass in hand;
And may his great posterity
Ne'er fail in old Scotland!

=== Field recordings ===
Many field recordings of the song were made of traditional singers performing the song, mostly in England. In 1908, Percy Grainger used phonograph technology to record a Lincolnshire man named William Short singing the song; the recording can be heard on the British Library Sound Archive website. James Madison Carpenter recorded a fragment sung by a Harry Wiltshire of Wheald, Oxfordshire in the 1930s, which is available on the Vaughan Williams Memorial Library website as well as another version probably performed by a Charles Phelps of Avening, Gloucestershire. The Shropshire singer Fred Jordan was recorded singing a traditional version in the 1960s.

A version recorded in Doolin, Co. Clare, Ireland from a Michael Flanagan in the 1970s is available courtesy of the County Clare Library.

The Scottish singer Duncan Williamson also had a traditional version which was recorded.

Helen Hartness Flanders recorded a version sung by a man named Thomas Armstrong of Mooers Forks, New York, USA in 1935.

== Musical adaptations ==
Ralph Vaughan Williams used a version of the song in his English Folk Song Suite (1923). Many versions of the song have been recorded, including popular versions by the rock groups Traffic (appearing on their 1970 album John Barleycorn Must Die) and Jethro Tull (appearing first on their 1992 album A Little Light Music and then on various other albums). The song is a central part of Simon Emmerson's The Imagined Village project. Martin and Eliza Carthy perform the song alongside Paul Weller on the Imagined Village album. Billy Bragg sang in Weller's place on live performances. Rock guitarist Joe Walsh performed the song live in 2007 as a tribute to Jim Capaldi. English folk musician Sam Lee recorded a version on his album "Old Wow", accompanied by a video filmed at Stonehenge. English black metal band Winterfylleth recorded a version included in the folk compilation One & All, Together, For Home.

== In popular culture ==
"John Barleycorn" has been used as a symbol or a slang term for alcohol, and its association with alcohol has been used in various areas of life. Several pubs in the South of England are called "John Barleycorn", in places including Duxford, Harlow, Goring, and Southampton. Jack London's 1913 autobiographical novel John Barleycorn takes its name from the song and discusses his enjoyment of drinking and struggles with alcoholism. The use of the term to symbolise alcohol misuse was so widespread that it was used as a headline on court reports about drunkenness in late Victorian times.

In the climax of the Inside No. 9 episode "Mr King" (2022), the song is performed by a class of schoolchildren as they prepare to ritualistically sacrifice their teacher for their harvest festival.

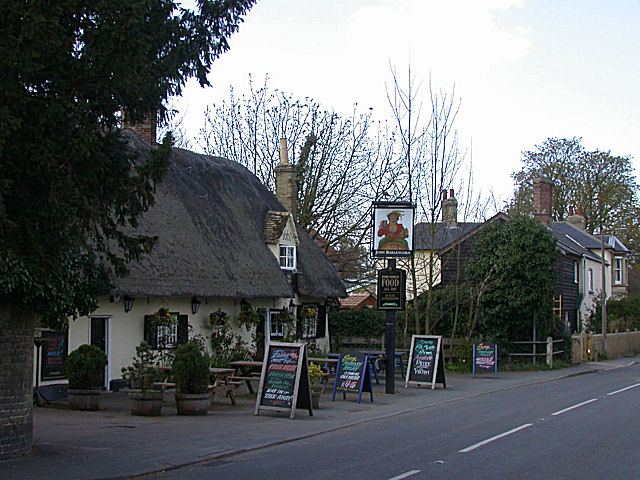
The John Barleycorn, Duxford, Cambridgeshire

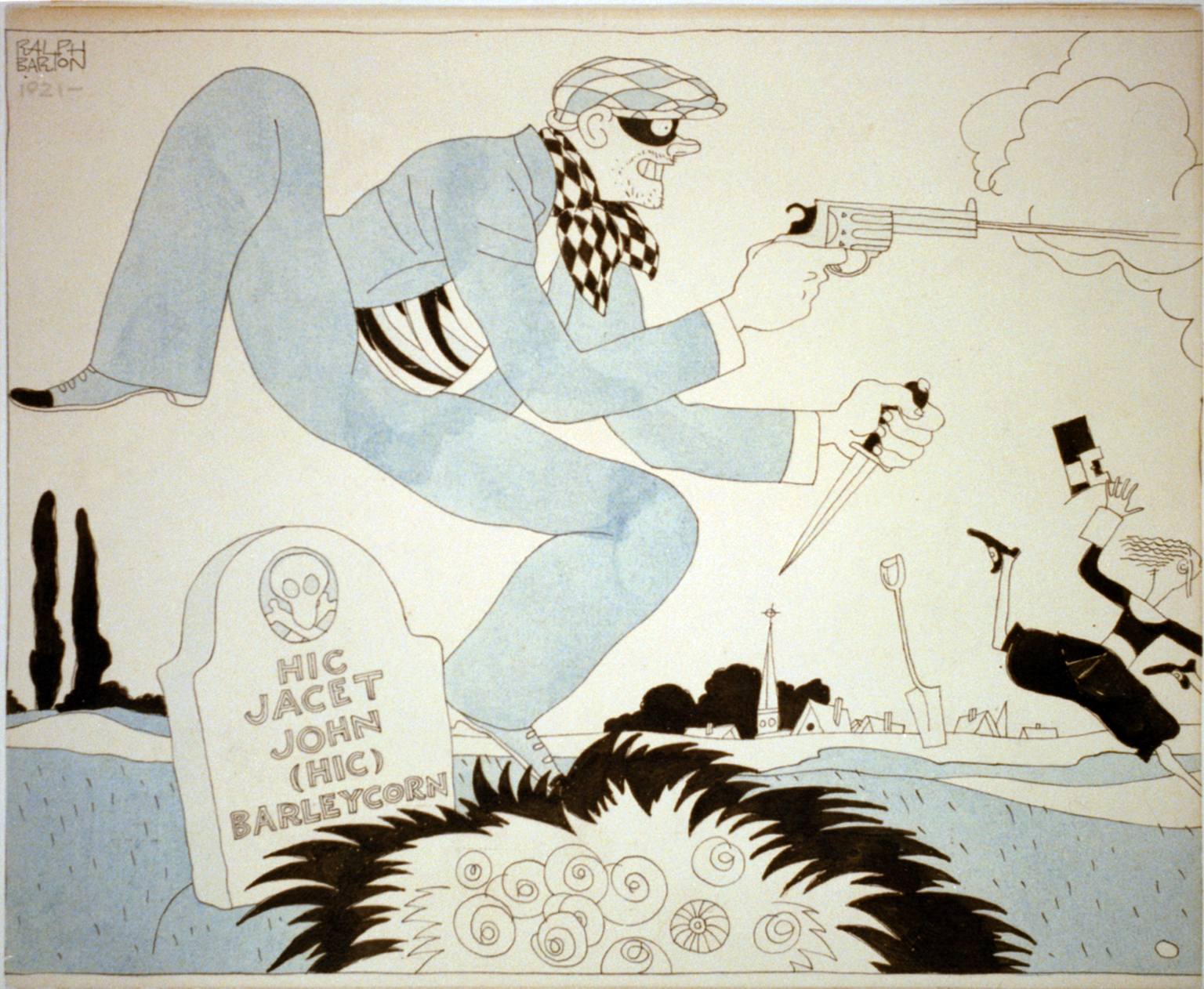
Use of "John Barleycorn" to symbolise alcohol in an anti-prohibition illustration

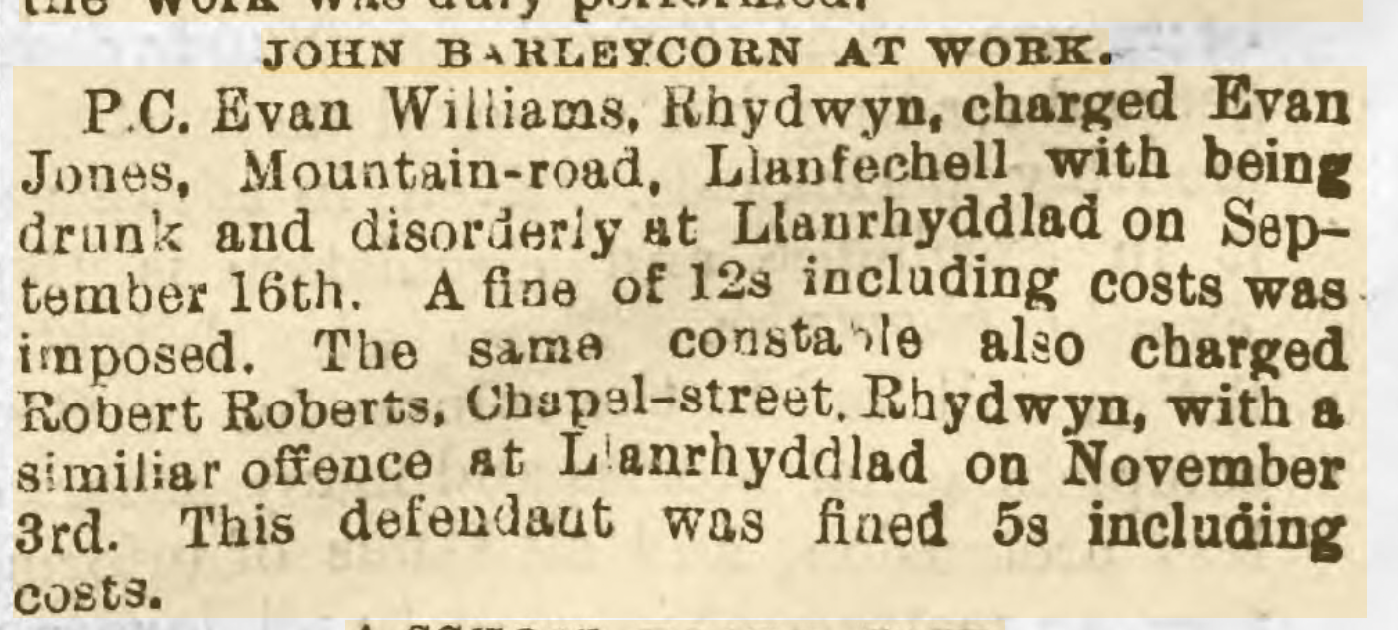
Headline: "John Barleycorn at Work"

== See also ==
- Corn dolly
- Harvest

== Sources ==
- The Function of Song in Contemporary British Drama by Elizabeth Hale Winkler On line book
- British Folk Music – John Barleycorn
- "John Barleycorn: The evolution of a folk-song family", Peter Wood, Folk Music Journal, Vol. 8 no. 4, 438-455.
