= The Wife of Auchtermuchty =

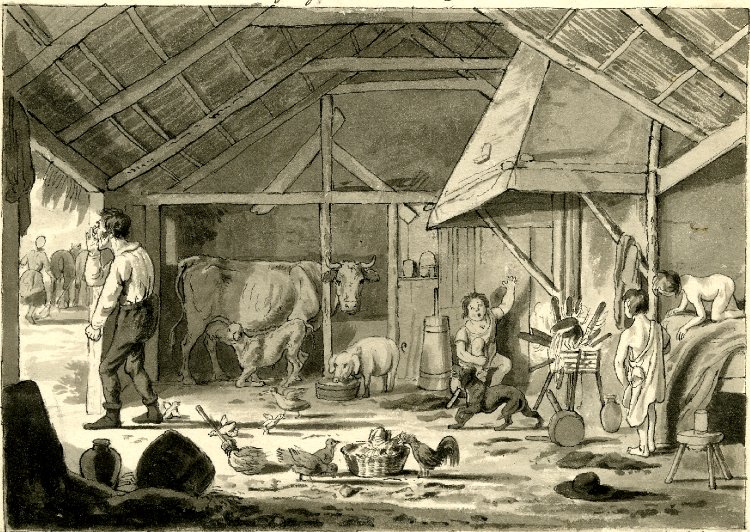
Scho hard him and scho hard him not, Bot stowtly steird the stottis abowt. "The Wife of Auchtermuchty" illustrated by Walter Geikie, early nineteenth century.

"The Wife of Auchtermuchty" is a Scots poem of the fifteenth or sixteenth centuries.

The poem narrates how a farmer, envious of his wife's apparently easy life, proposes that the couple exchange their normal responsibilities. She will work the fields and he will take care of the home.

The wife agrees to the proposal and proves to be quite capable with a plough.

Meanwhile, under her husband's supervision, the housework descends into comical chaos. At the end of the day, with some encouragement from his shrewd and strong-willed wife, the husband decides that he has learnt a valuable lesson and will return to his plough.

"The Wife of Auchtermuchty" is characterised by physical humour and wry observations on the relationship between husband and wife. In contrast to most of the works of the contemporary makars it concentrates on the life and circumstances of ordinary people.

The poem gives a vivid depiction of domestic life in rural Scotland during the late medieval era.

== The text ==
"The Wife of Auchtermuchty" is of uncertain date and authorship. The text is found only in the Bannatyne Manuscript which dates to the latter sixteenth century and contains works of the sixteenth and fifteenth centuries. As such the poem is most likely to be of this era.

In the manuscript an unidentified scribe, not George Bannatyne himself, attributes the piece to an author called only "Mofat".

The poem's first modern publication, with many modifications, was in The Ever Green of Allan Ramsay between 1724 and 1727.

The text given in this article is that from the Bannatyne Manuscript.

== Historical context ==
The family depicted in the poem are tenant farmers in the lowlands of Scotland. They live with their livestock in a two-roomed cottage of the but and ben design. The but was an outer room, with external access, used for cooking, storage and other household work. The ben was an interior room, warmer and more comfortable than the but, used to accommodate the family.

The poem predates the introduction of draught horses in Scottish agriculture. The family's plough is pulled by oxen.

== Synopsis ==
=== The husband's proposal ===
The narrator opens by describing a tenant farmer of Auchtermuchty who enjoys the small comforts of life. He attempts a day of ploughing in bad weather.

In Auchtermuchty thair dwelt ane man,
Ane husband as I heard it tawld,
Quha weill could tippill out a can,
And nathir luvit hungir nor cawld.
Quhill anis it fell upoun a day,
He yokkit his pluch upoun the plane,
Gif it be trew as I hard say,
The day was fowl for wind and rane.

At the day's end he arrives home, "weary, wet and cold", to find his wife warming herself by the fire, clean and dry, with a bowl of soup.

He lowsit the pluch at the landis end,
And draif his oxin hame at evin,
When he come in he lookit ben,
And saw the wyf baith dry and clene,
And sittand at ane fyre beikand bawld,
With ane fat soup as I hard say,
The man being wery, weit and cauld,
Between thay twa it was na play.

He demands that the couple exchange their duties on the next day. The wife shall plough while he keeps the house.

Dame, ye mon to the pluch to morne,
I salbe hussy gif I may,

The wife agrees and then describes what work will be required of him. The husband must tend to the livestock, sift, knead, keep their infant children clean, maintain the hearth and protect their goslings. In passing she reminds him that "We have a costly farm on our head."

Husband, quho scho, content am I,
To tak the pluch my day abowt,
And ye will rowll baith kavis and ky,
And all the hous baith in and owt.
But sen that ye will husyskep ken,
First ye sall sift and syne sall kned,
And ay as ye gang but and ben,
Luk that the bairnis dryt not the bed,
Yeis lay ane soft wisp to the kill,
We haif ane deir ferme on our heid,
And ay as ye gang furth and in,
Keip weill the gaislingis fra the gled.

The wife spends the rest of the evening churning a batch of butter and leaves only buttermilk instead of cream for her husband.

Scho kyrnd the kyrne and skumd it clene,
And left the gudman bot the bledoch bair,

=== The wife and husband at work ===
The wife rises early the next morning and sets off for the fields carrying an unusually hearty lunch.

Than in the mornyng up scho gatt,
And on hir hairt laid hir disjune,
Scho put alsmekle in hir lap,
As micht haif servd thame baith at nune.

The husband rises next and his day starts badly when five out of seven goslings are taken by a hawk. Before he can recover his composure, some calves escape their pen and start to suckle at the cattle. While separating them he is gored in the buttock by an "ill willy cow". He returns home and attempts some spinning but spoils his work by sitting too close to the fire.

Quod he, this wark has ill begynning.

He moves on to the churning, previously sabotaged by his wife, and unsurprisingly does not produce much butter. While he is distracted by this a sow starts to drink the buttermilk. While driving it off with a stick he accidentally bludgeons the two remaining goslings. A series of other mishaps occur before he attends to the babies and discovers that they have soiled the bed.

The first that he gat in his armis,
It was all dirt up to its ene,
The divill cutt of thair handis quod he,
That fild yow all sa fow this strene.

He drags the dirty bedclothes to a burn for cleaning but they are washed away in the spate. In despair, the husband shouts to his wife in the fields for help. She pretends not to hear him and continues her ploughing until evening.

Scho hard him and scho hard him not,
Bot stowtly steird the stottis abowt,
Scho draif the day unto the nicht,
Scho lowsit the pluch and syne come hame.

=== The conclusion ===
Upon arriving home the wife observes the chaos wrought by her husband.

Scho fand all wrang that sowld bene richt,
I trow the man thocht richt grit schame,

After a quarrel the husband decides, with some persuasion from his cudgel-wielding wife, to return to his usual work.

Than up scho gat ane mekle rung,
And the gudeman maid to the dur,
Quod he, deme, I sall hald my tung,
For and we fecht ill get the woir
Quod he, quhen I forsuk my pluche,
I trow I but forsuk my seill,
And I will to my pluch agane,
For I and this hous will nevir do weill.

== Resource ==
- A printed edition of 1803 which differs somewhat from the Bannatyne text. It is accompanied by a Latin translation.
