= Quha Hes Gud Malt And Makis Ill Drynk =

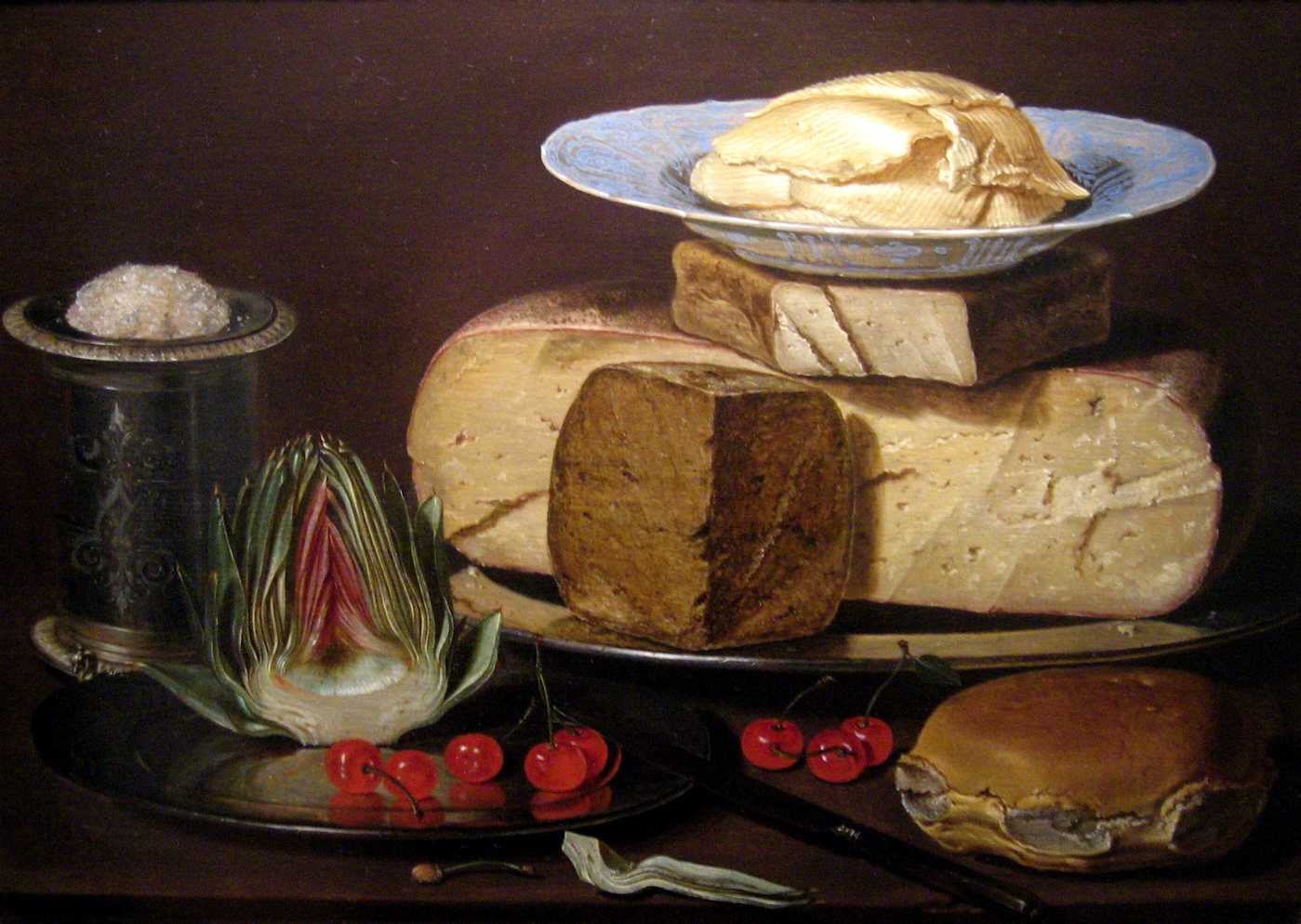
A meal with a tankard of Ale. "Still Life with Cheeses, Artichoke, and Cherries". Clara Peeters, Early seventeenth Century.

Quha Hes Gud Malt And Makis Ill Drynk is a brief, anonymous Scots poem of the sixteenth century which praises skillful brewers and curses unskillful ones. Throughout the poem, the brewers are assumed to be female. The poem is found in the Bannatyne Manuscript.

== Attribution ==
No author is named in the manuscript. Instead, the poem is given the post-script "Quod Allanis Suddart" or, in English, "So Said Allan's Soldier."

The post-script is similar to that of the poem Quhy Sowld Nocht Allane Honorit Be, which is also found in the Bannatyne Manuscript. Both poems share the theme of ale-drinking.

== Synopsis ==
Quha Hes Gud Malt And Makis Ill Drynk consists of two verses. The first stanza declares that women who brew a poor ale, despite having good malt, should be damned in the worst of circumstances.

Original Text

Quha hes gud malt and makis ill drynk,
Wa mot be hir wird.
I pray to God Scho rott and stynk,
Sevin yeir abone the erd,
Abowt hir beir na bell to clink,
Nor clerk sing, lawd nor lerd,
Bot quytt to hell that scho may sink.
The taptre quhyll scho steird.

This beis my prayer,
For that man sleyar,
Quhill Christ in Hevin sall heird.

A Translation Into English

Who has good malt and makes poor drink,
Woe must be her fate.
I pray to God that she rot and stink,
Seven years above the earth,
About her bier no bell to ring,
Nor cleric to sing loud nor learned,
But quit to hell so that she may sink,
While working her cask.

This is my prayer,
To that man-slayer,
Who Christ in heaven shall keep.

In contrast, the second stanza wishes that skillful brewers should enjoy a happy funeral followed by salvation in heaven.

Original Text

Quha brewis and gevis me of the best,
Sa it be stark and staill.
Quhyt and cleir weill to degest,
In hevin meit hir that aill,
Lang mot scho leif, lang mot scho lest,
In lyking ane gude saill.
In hevin or erd that wyfe be best,
Without barcett or bail.

Quhen scho is deid,
Withowttin pleid,
Scho pass to hevin all haill.

A Translation Into English

Who brews and gives me the best of it,
So that it is strong and flat,
Pale, clear and easy to digest,
May she meet that ale in heaven!
Long may she live, long may she spend,
Her wake as a peaceful journey,
In Heaven or earth that woman is best,
Without exception.

When she is dead,
With no argument,
May she pass to heaven intact.
