= List of listed buildings in Auchtermuchty, Fife =

This is a list of listed buildings in the parish of Auchtermuchty in Fife, Scotland.

== List ==
Name	Location	Date listed	Grid ref. (Note: Sometimes known as OSGB36, the grid reference (where provided) is based on the British national grid reference system used by the Ordnance Survey. • "Guide to National Grid". Ordnance Survey. • "Get-a-map". Ordnance Survey.)	Geo-coordinates	Notes	LB number (Note: Historic Environment Scotland assign a unique alphanumeric identifier to each designated site in Scotland, for listed buildings this always begins with "LB", for example "LB12345".)	Image
Avondale, Burnside				56°17′28″N 3°13′44″W	Category C(S)	21438	Upload Photo
House (Eric T King) Burnside (Cupar Road In Valuation Roll				56°17′30″N 3°13′45″W	Category C(S)	21441	Upload Photo
Bank Of Scotland, Burnside				56°17′30″N 3°13′46″W	Category C(S)	21442	Upload another image
Eden Cottage Arnott Street And Distillery Street				56°17′39″N 3°14′07″W	Category B	21455	Upload Photo
2 and 4 Newburgh Road, Auchtermuchty				56°17′40″N 3°14′09″W	Category C(S)	21461	Upload Photo
Malt Barn And Kiln Behind The Cross (21 High Street)				56°17′33″N 3°13′57″W	Category B	21464	Upload Photo
Parish Churchyard Including Bridge Over Auchtermuchty Burn				56°17′31″N 3°13′50″W	Category C(S)	21362	Upload Photo
Parish Church Manse Including Offices And Garden Walls. Kirk Wynd				56°17′28″N 3°13′50″W	Category B	21364	Upload Photo
Wanlock, High Street				56°17′31″N 3°13′56″W	Category C(S)	21370	Upload Photo
Auchtermuchty Co-Operative Premises, Eastern Section Adjoining Macduff House Only High Street				56°17′31″N 3°14′01″W	Category C(S)	21377	Upload Photo
Craigowan, High Street				56°17′31″N 3°13′55″W	Category B	21384	Upload Photo
Millflat House High Street And Millflat				56°17′30″N 3°14′13″W	Category C(S)	21402	Upload Photo
Kilburn, High Road				56°17′28″N 3°14′17″W	Category C(S)	21407	Upload Photo
Ardloe, High Road				56°17′25″N 3°14′25″W	Category C(S)	21409	Upload Photo
10 Orchard Flat, Auchtermuchty				56°17′26″N 3°13′47″W	Category C(S)	21423	Upload another image
8 Orchard Flat, Auchtermuchty				56°17′26″N 3°13′47″W	Category C(S)	21424	Upload another image
Walls On North Side Of Cupar Road, From Victoria Hall To Austina And Eastbrook				56°17′31″N 3°13′41″W	Category C(S)	21429	Upload Photo
Shangri-La And Helenslea Cupar Road				56°17′30″N 3°13′41″W	Category C(S)	21430	Upload another image
Myres Castle				56°17′07″N 3°13′35″W	Category B	2658	Upload another image
Myres Castle Walled Garden, Sundial And Statue Of Mercury				56°17′07″N 3°13′39″W	Category B	2660	Upload Photo
Broombrae Farmhouse				56°17′52″N 3°13′50″W	Category B	140	Upload Photo
Beveridge Hall Kilnheugh				56°17′32″N 3°13′59″W	Category C(S)	21444	Upload Photo
House (J Haxton) Kilnheugh				56°17′33″N 3°13′58″W	Category C(S)	21448	Upload Photo
House (Mrs A S Rennie) Upper Greens				56°17′40″N 3°14′05″W	Category C(S)	21451	Upload Photo
Nordean Arnott Street				56°17′39″N 3°14′05″W	Category C(S)	21454	Upload Photo
Madras Road, Simpson Terrace, House(G Carmichael)				56°17′39″N 3°14′08″W	Category C(S)	21459	Upload Photo
Fairmount High Street, Including Garden Walls				56°17′31″N 3°13′55″W	Category C(S)	21367	Upload Photo
Shop (Helen Carmichael) The Cross				56°17′32″N 3°13′57″W	Category C(S)	21387	Upload Photo
Brae House, 25 and 27 High Street, Auchtermuchty				56°17′32″N 3°13′59″W	Category B	21390	Upload Photo
Ringwood, High Street				56°17′32″N 3°14′01″W	Category C(S)	21391	Upload Photo
Haw Bank, Parliament Square High Street				56°17′31″N 3°14′05″W	Category C(S)	21396	Upload Photo
Rennie's Foodmarket, Store Building Adjoining Ramleh, High Street				56°17′30″N 3°14′06″W	Category C(S)	21398	Upload Photo
Braehead House, High Street				56°17′30″N 3°14′08″W	Category B	21400	Upload Photo
Fernbank, High Road				56°17′28″N 3°14′17″W	Category C(S)	21406	Upload Photo
Dovecot House Crosshills				56°17′26″N 3°14′05″W	Category C(S)	21414	Upload Photo
Hollies Hotel, Low Road				56°17′27″N 3°13′50″W	Category B	21419	Upload Photo
Bridge Over Auchtermuchty Burn, Eden Place Junction With Station Road				56°17′25″N 3°13′47″W	Category C(S)	21426	Upload Photo
Myres Castle East Lodge And Gatepiers				56°17′08″N 3°13′30″W	Category C(S)	2659	Upload Photo
3 And 5 Burnside				56°17′26″N 3°13′45″W	Category C(S)	49902	Upload Photo
Cameron Farm Cottages (Pairsie Cottage, Cameron Cottage And One Other) Cupar Road				56°17′31″N 3°13′38″W	Category C(S)	21433	Upload Photo
House (D Ford) Upper Greens				56°17′40″N 3°14′06″W	Category B	21452	Upload Photo
Auchtermuchty Parish Church				56°17′30″N 3°13′51″W	Category B	21361	Upload another image
Kirklea (House And Shop, Anne B Gray) High Street, Including Garden Walls				56°17′30″N 3°13′56″W	Category C(S)	21368	Upload Photo
Macduff House, High Street Including Garden Walls				56°17′31″N 3°14′01″W	Category B	21375	Upload Photo
House And Shop (Mrs Forgan) High Street				56°17′30″N 3°13′54″W	Category C(S)	21382	Upload Photo
Orchard Cottage, High Street				56°17′32″N 3°14′02″W	Category B	21393	Upload Photo
Eden Place (Shop And House, John Whyte)				56°17′27″N 3°13′49″W	Category C(S)	21421	Upload Photo
12 Orchard Flat, Auchtermuchty				56°17′26″N 3°13′48″W	Category C(S)	21422	Upload another image
House (Nunziato Valente), Cupar Road				56°17′29″N 3°13′47″W	Category C(S)	21428	Upload Photo
Cameron House And Garage (Wlodzimierz Krzyzanowski) Cupar Road, Corner Of Bow Road				56°17′30″N 3°13′40″W	Category B	21431	Upload another image
9 And 11 Burnside				56°17′27″N 3°13′44″W	Category C(S)	49903	Upload Photo
11 Bow Road, St Johns				56°17′29″N 3°13′35″W	Category B	21435	Upload Photo
Southfield, Station Road				56°17′22″N 3°13′43″W	Category B	21436	Upload Photo
Parapet Walls And Bridges Over Auchtermuchty Burn, Burnside Newburgh Road And Upper Greens From North Side Of Cupar Road To Arnott Street Bridge				56°17′36″N 3°14′00″W	Category B	21439	Upload Photo
Old United Free Church Now Workshop (Peter Fordyce) Including Front Wall And Gatepiers, Burnside				56°17′31″N 3°13′46″W	Category C(S)	21443	Upload another image
Houses (Jean Robertson) Kilnheugh				56°17′34″N 3°13′57″W	Category C(S)	21449	Upload Photo
Madras Road, Simpson Terrace, Ivy Cottage				56°17′38″N 3°14′08″W	Category C(S)	21457	Upload Photo
Madras Road, Simpson Terrace, House (Mckendrick)				56°17′39″N 3°14′08″W	Category C(S)	21458	Upload Photo
The Cottage, Middleflat				56°17′34″N 3°13′36″W	Category C(S)	21462	Upload Photo
Former Free And Baptist Churches, (Now Parish And Foresters Halls) The Croft				56°17′31″N 3°13′52″W	Category B	21363	Upload another image
House And Shop (A P Whitehead), High Street				56°17′30″N 3°13′56″W	Category B	21369	Upload Photo
House, Sh0P, Etc (James R Allan James M Allan & Son) High Street, The Cross				56°17′31″N 3°13′59″W	Category C(S)	21374	Upload Photo
Strathview, High Road				56°17′28″N 3°14′15″W	Category C(S)	21404	Upload Photo
Fernbank House, High Road				56°17′28″N 3°14′16″W	Category C(S)	21405	Upload Photo
Dunrobin, Pitmedden Wynd				56°17′28″N 3°14′05″W	Category C(S)	21412	Upload Photo
Rocklea And Craiginver, Crosshills				56°17′25″N 3°14′08″W	Category C(S)	21413	Upload Photo
Victoria Hall Burnside				56°17′30″N 3°13′45″W	Category C(S)	21440	Upload another image
Madras Road, Parliament Place, Innervar				56°17′32″N 3°14′06″W	Category B	21456	Upload Photo
Wyoming And Adjoining House (Scott) Parliament Square, High Street				56°17′30″N 3°14′04″W	Category B	21378	Upload Photo
Spynie, Parliament Square, High Street				56°17′30″N 3°14′05″W	Category C(S)	21379	Upload Photo
Broomfield High Street				56°17′30″N 3°14′05″W	Category C(S)	21380	Upload Photo
Hall (Girl Guides) High Street				56°17′32″N 3°14′01″W	Category C(S)	21392	Upload another image
Orchard House, High Street				56°17′32″N 3°14′02″W	Category B	21394	Upload Photo
Kinbrae, Parliament Square High Street				56°17′31″N 3°14′04″W	Category C(S)	21395	Upload Photo
Ramleh, High Street				56°17′30″N 3°14′07″W	Category B	21399	Upload Photo
Lochybank, House, Garden Wall And Gatepiers, High Road				56°17′29″N 3°14′18″W	Category C(S)	21403	Upload Photo
The Bield, High Road				56°17′25″N 3°14′24″W	Category C(S)	21408	Upload Photo
Royal Hotel, Cupar Road, Including Garaging And Stabling				56°17′27″N 3°13′47″W	Category C(S)	21427	Upload another image
Pitmenzie Old Farmhouse				56°18′34″N 3°15′54″W	Category B	6569	Upload Photo
Donsbank				56°17′31″N 3°14′30″W	Category C(S)	2656	Upload Photo
Gasworks House Burnside				56°17′26″N 3°13′45″W	Category C(S)	21437	Upload another image
Kilcairn Kilnheugh				56°17′34″N 3°13′59″W	Category C(S)	21446	Upload Photo
Premises (Wm Mcbain) Upper Greens				56°17′38″N 3°14′03″W	Category C(S)	21450	Upload Photo
Macduff House Dovecot, High Street				56°17′29″N 3°14′01″W	Category B	21376	Upload Photo
Mo Dhachaidh, High Street				56°17′30″N 3°14′06″W	Category C(S)	21381	Upload Photo
House And Surgery (Drs Muir, Millar And White) The Cross				56°17′32″N 3°13′56″W	Category C(S)	21386	Upload Photo
Queen's Hotel, The Cross Including Outbuildings				56°17′32″N 3°13′58″W	Category C(S)	21389	Upload another image
Fernlea, Low Road				56°17′25″N 3°14′09″W	Category C(S)	21415	Upload Photo
Southport House, Low Road				56°17′27″N 3°13′49″W	Category C(S)	21420	Upload another image
6 And 6A Orchard Flat, Auchtermuchty				56°17′26″N 3°13′48″W	Category C(S)	21425	Upload Photo
House, Cameron Farm, Cupar Road				56°17′31″N 3°13′39″W	Category B	21432	Upload another image
House And Garage (Edward S A Carley) Bow Road				56°17′29″N 3°13′36″W	Category C(S)	21434	Upload Photo
8 and 10 Kilnheugh including former smiddy to rear, Auchtermuchty				56°17′34″N 3°13′58″W	Category C(S)	21447	Upload Photo
Madras Road And Newburgh Road, Simpson Terrace, House (Mckendrick)				56°17′40″N 3°14′09″W	Category B	21460	Upload Photo
6 Middleflat, Auchtermuchty (Street Elevation Only)				56°17′37″N 3°13′37″W	Category C(S)	21463	Upload Photo
Mayfield (House And Joseph Maltman's Shop And Offices) Kirk Wynd				56°17′29″N 3°13′54″W	Category C(S)	21366	Upload Photo
War Memorial, The Cross				56°17′32″N 3°13′58″W	Category B	21373	Upload another image
House (Livingstone) The Cross, High Street				56°17′31″N 3°13′55″W	Category C(S)	21383	Upload Photo
Georgeville, High Street				56°17′31″N 3°13′55″W	Category B	21385	Upload Photo
Cross House, The Cross				56°17′32″N 3°13′57″W	Category C(S)	21388	Upload another image
Rose Cottage, Low Road				56°17′25″N 3°14′10″W	Category C(S)	21416	Upload Photo
Redwood, With Garden Walls, Low Road And Gladgate				56°17′27″N 3°14′00″W	Category C(S)	21417	Upload Photo
Garden Walls Of Bellevue And Orton, Low Road And Gladgate				56°17′26″N 3°13′58″W	Category C(S)	21418	Upload Photo
Cunrebank Kilnheugh				56°17′33″N 3°13′59″W	Category C(S)	21445	Upload Photo
Westford Upper Greens				56°17′41″N 3°14′06″W	Category B	21453	Upload Photo
Ashbank, Kirk Wynd Including Outbuildings And Garden Walls				56°17′29″N 3°13′54″W	Category B	21365	Upload Photo
Post Office, (House And Shop, D L Wallace) High Street				56°17′31″N 3°13′57″W	Category C(S)	21371	Upload another image
Auchtermuchty Town House And Council Chambers, High Street				56°17′31″N 3°13′58″W	Category B	21372	Upload another image
House (M W Peters) High Street, Corner Of Madras Road				56°17′30″N 3°14′05″W	Category B	21397	Upload Photo
Braehead House Annexe, High Street				56°17′30″N 3°14′09″W	Category B	21401	Upload Photo
Myrtle Cottage, Pitmedden Wynd				56°17′29″N 3°14′07″W	Category C(S)	21411	Upload Photo
Leckiebank Farmhouse				56°17′44″N 3°15′19″W	Category C(S)	2657	Upload Photo

== Key ==
The scheme for classifying buildings in Scotland is:

- Category A: "buildings of national or international importance, either architectural or historic; or fine, little-altered examples of some particular period, style or building type."
- Category B: "buildings of regional or more than local importance; or major examples of some particular period, style or building type, which may have been altered."
- Category C: "buildings of local importance; lesser examples of any period, style, or building type, as originally constructed or moderately altered; and simple traditional buildings which group well with other listed buildings."

In March 2016 there were 47,288 listed buildings in Scotland. Of these, 8% were Category A, and 50% were Category B, with the remaining 42% being Category C.

== See also ==
- List of listed buildings in Fife
