= Wilson Wilson =

Wilson Wilson may refer to:

- Wilson Dobie Wilson (1803–1838), Scottish antiquary
- Wilson Wilson, Jr, a fictional character in the television program Home Improvement
- Wilson Wilson, a fictional character in Utopia (TV series)
