= The Hunterian Club =

Hunterian Club
- Formation: 1871
- Founded at: Glasgow
- Dissolved: 1902?
- Region served: Scotland

The Hunterian Club was a Scottish literary and text publication society, founded in Glasgow in 1871.

The club was founded for "the reproduction of the works of Scottish writers of Elizabethan times" and described itself as a "reprinting club", modelled on the Maitland Club. It was named in honour of William Hunter's gift of his large collection of papers and books to the University of Glasgow upon his death in 1783, many of which the club reprinted, as well as the funding to set up the Hunterian Museum and Art Gallery.

The club used subscription fees to reprint old or out-of-print texts which they considered to be of importance to Scottish history and culture, including collected editions of poets whose works had hitherto been largely inaccessible, such as Samuel Rowlands and Thomas Lodge. The club published the Bannatyne Manuscript in 1873, under the editorship first of the Reverend George A. Panton and then of James Barclay Murdoch, which, although some of its contents had been lately republished, was generally unavailable to the public in its entirety.

Their final report was published in 1902.
