= Maitland Club =

Literary club based in Glasgow

The Maitland Club was a Scottish historical and literary club and text publication society, modelled on the Roxburghe Club and the Bannatyne Club. It took its name from Sir Richard Maitland (later Lord Lethington), the Scottish poet. The club was founded in Glasgow in 1828, to edit and publish early Scottish texts. Since the distribution of the publications was usually limited to members, the typical print run was between seventy and a hundred copies. The club was wound up in 1859, after publishing its own history as its 80th volume. The later Hunterian Club modelled themselves on the Maitland Club.

== Presidents ==
- The Earl of Glasgow (around 1835)

== Notable members ==
- Sir Michael Shaw-Stewart, 7th Baronet
- Robert Pitcairn
- Prince Augustus Frederick, Duke of Sussex
- John Campbell, 7th Duke of Argyll
- Walter Montagu Douglas Scott, 5th Duke of Buccleuch
- John Crichton-Stuart, 2nd Marquess of Bute
- Henry Cockburn, Lord Cockburn
- Sir David Hunter-Blair, 3rd Baronet
- Sir Thomas Makdougall-Brisbane
- Patrick Fraser Tytler
- Wilson Dobie Wilson
- Beriah Botfield
- James Dennistoun
- James Dunlop
- John Gibson Lockhart

== Items published ==
- Scalacronica, 1836, edited by Joseph Stevenson from the MS at Corpus Christi College, Cambridge.
- Chronicon de Lanercost, 1839.
