= How The First Helandman of God Was Maid =

Anonymous comic poem in Scots

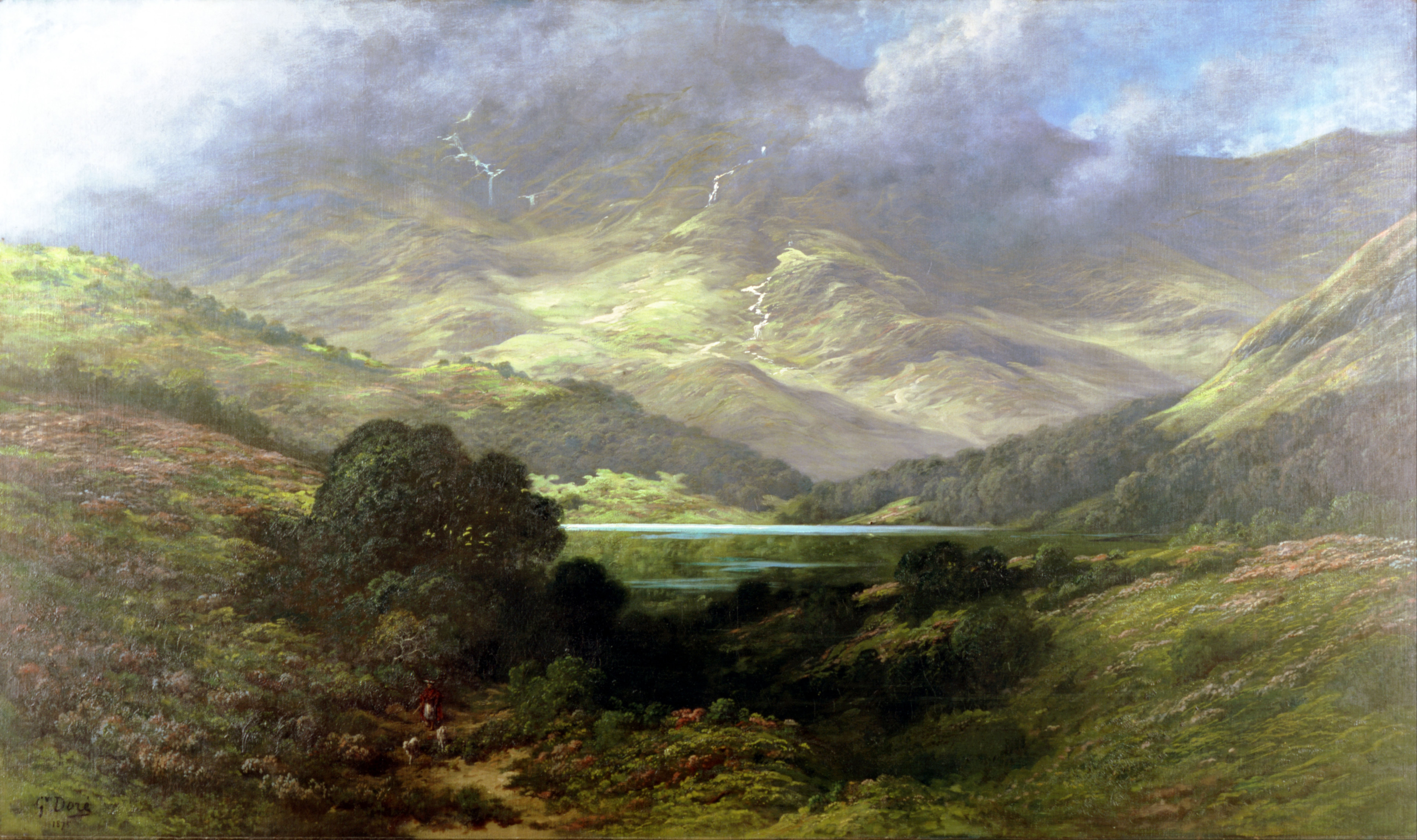
A Highland landscape. Gustave Doré, 1875.

How the First Helandman of God Was Maid is an anonymous comic poem in Scots preserved in the Bannatyne Manuscript of the sixteenth century.

The poem narrates how, following a wager proposed to him by Saint Peter, God creates the first Highlander from a piece of horse manure. The prototype Highlander is depicted as a petty thief and a stealer of Lowlanders' cattle.

In the Bannatyne Manuscript the poem's full title is given as How the first Helandman of God was maid, Of ane Horss Turd, in Argylle, as is said. The piece is attributed to no author.

== Synopsis ==
=== The Wager ===
The poem opens with God and Saint Peter walking "High up in Argyll, where their path lay." Peter asks the Lord "Can you not make a Highlandman out of this horse turd?"

God and Sanct Petir was gangand be the way,
Heiche up in Ardgyle quhair thair gait lay;
Sanct Petir said to God in a sport word,
Can ye nocht mak a Heilandman of this horss tourd?

=== The Highlander is Created ===
With a touch of his staff, God creates a Highlander from the piece of dung and asks him "Where do you want to go?"

God turnd owre the horss turd with his pykit staff,
And up start a Helandman blak as ony draff.
Quod God to the Helandman, Quhair wilt thow now?

The Highlander replies that he will go to the Lowlands to steal livestock.

I will doun in the Lawland, Lord, and thair steill a kow.

When God points out to the Highlander that he will be hanged for this crime the man claims to be indifferent. "I must die one day" he says.

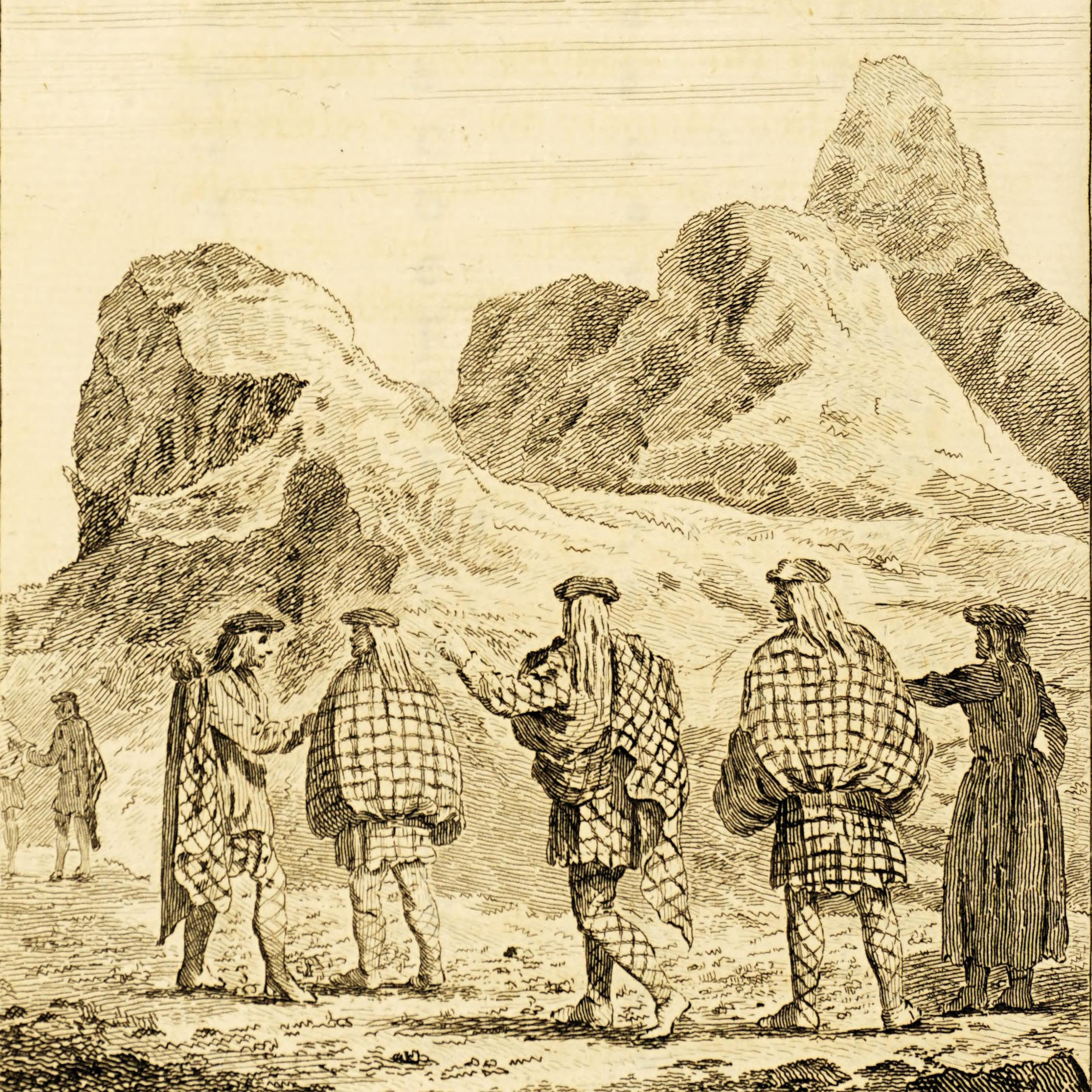
Plaided Highlanders in an 18th century engraving

And thow steill a cow, cairle, thair they will hang the.
Quattrack, Lord, of that, for anis mon I die?

God is amused by this and then departs by leaping over a wall. While doing so his knife falls from its sheath.

God than he lewch, and owre the dyke lap,
And owt of his scheith his gowlly owtgatt.

=== The Missing Knife ===
Peter searches thoroughly but unsuccessfully for the lost knife.

Sanct Petir socht this gowly fast up and doun,
Yit cowld not find it in all that braid rownn.

God observes "Here's a marvel! How can it be that my knife is missing when there are only three of us here?"

Now, quod God, heir a mervell, how can this be,
That I sowld want my gowly, and we heir bot thre?

The Highlander does not reply but, while turning to leave, the lost knife falls from a fold of his plaid.

Humff, quod the Helandman, and turnd him abowtt,
And at his plaid nuk the guly fell owt.

Saint Peter reprimands him. "You will never do well. You, new-made, so soon turning to theft."

Fy, quod Sanct Petir, thow will nevir do weill,
And thow but new maid sa sone gais to steill.

The Highlander is unrepentant. The poem ends with him swearing an oath upon a nearby church. "As long as I may find goods to steal, I will never work!"

Umff, quod the Helandman, and swere be yon kirk,
Sa lang as I may geir gett to steill, will I nevir wirk.
