= Quhy Sowld Nocht Allane Honorit Be =

"Quhy Sowld Nocht Allane Honorit Be" ("Why Should Not Allan Honoured Be?") is an anonymous allegorical poem of the fifteenth or sixteenth century written in Scots.

Literally the poem recounts the strange life and adventures of a man called "Allane" who grows from a youth to a powerful adult. Figuratively each of its stanzas also represents an aspect of the production or consumption of ale.

Obliquely it describes the cultivation of barley, malting, brewing and the various effects of drinking. "Allane" is a personification of ale.

Although some attention is paid to the undesirable consequences of drunkenness, the tone of the poem is mostly one of praise for the drink.

== Text ==
The text of Quhy Sowld Nocht Allane Honorit Be is found in the Bannatyne Manuscript of the late sixteenth century in which no author is named.

The poem is however given the postscript Finis Quod Allane Matsonis Suddartis. This may be translated as End. Thus spoke Allane Maltson's soldiers.

== Synopsis ==
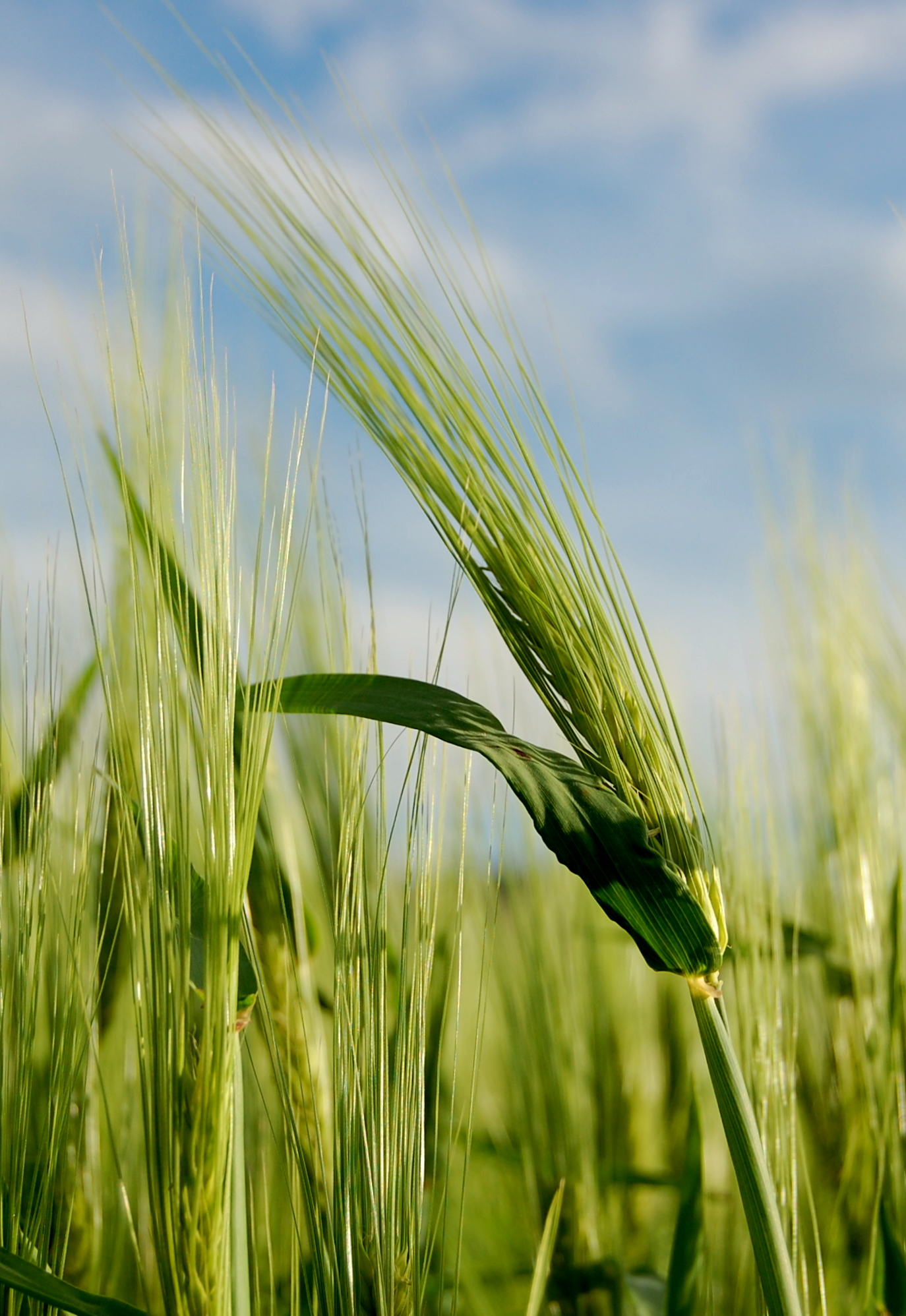
Quhen he was yung and cled in grene, haifand his air about his ene. Young stalks of barley.

"Allane" is introduced as a youth, "Clad in green, with his hair around his eyes." The allusion is to unripe stalks of barley.

Quhen he was yung and cled in grene,
Haifand his air about his ene,
Baith men and wemen did him mene,
Quhen he grew on yon hillis hie,
Quhy sowld nocht Allane honorit be?

His "foster father", the farmer of the barley, visits and finds him "lying in a swoon". This refers to the drooping heads of mature barley.

His foster faider fure of the toun,
To vissy Allane he maid boun,
He saw him lyand, alace, in swoun,

Allane's head "begins to split." A nurse is sent for who brings fifty-five "Men of War" with her.

Thay saw his heid begin to ryfe,
Syne for ane nureis they send belyfe,
Quha brocht with hir fyfty and fyve,
Of men of war full prevely,
Quhy sowld nocht Allane honorit be?

In other words, the barley is ripe and harvesting has begun.

Thay rushit furth like hellis rukis,
And every ane of them had hukis,
Thay caucht him schortly in their clukis,

After being brought indoors, everyone pledges to stand close to Allane. This may be an allusion to the laborious work of malting and brewing.

Syne every freind made him his band,
Quwill they micht owdir gang or stand,
Nevir ane fute fra him to flee,

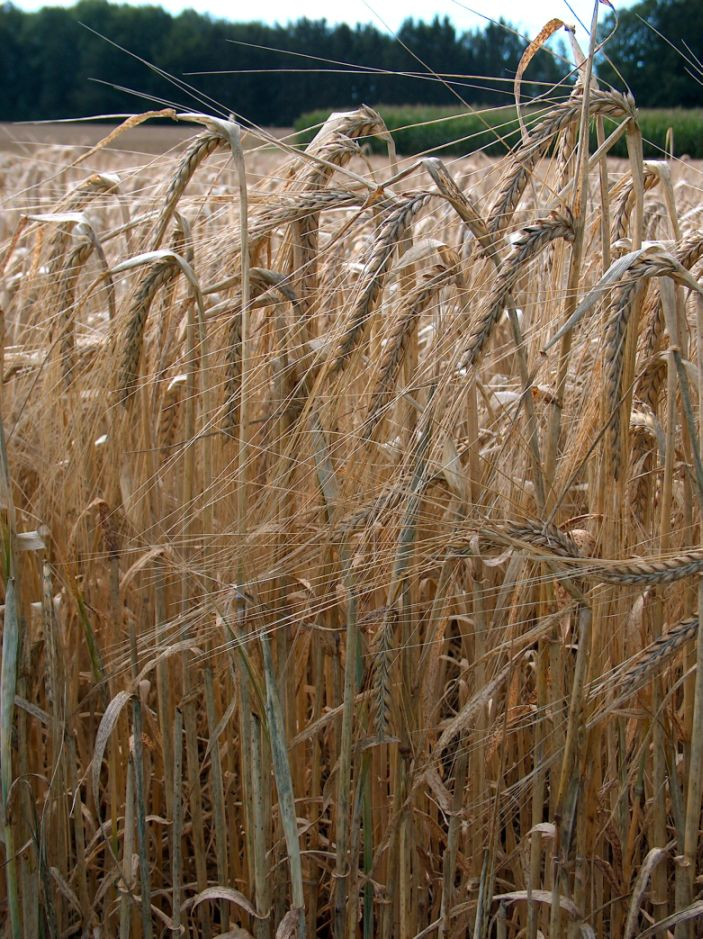
He saw him lyand, alace, in swoun. Ripe Stalks of Barley.

The effects of drinking ale are dealt with in the remaining verses. The themes discussed are,

- Dutch courage. "The greatest cowart in the land, Frae he with Allane enter in band, Yit forty sall nocht gar him flee"
- Conviviality. "Fra hand to hand so dois he hop, Quhill sum may nowdir speik nor se."
- Celebration. "In Yule quwen ilk man singis his carrell, gude Allane lyis in to ane barell"
- Incapacitation. "Backwart on the floor fallis he."
- Physical side-effects. "Upoun their fais he settis his mark, A blude reid nose beside their ee".
- Expense. My maistir Allane I may sair curse, He levis no mony in my purse."

The poem concludes with a round of unqualified praise for "Allane" who, alongside his other virtues, "provides us with our daily food."

Ale was the most common beverage in medieval Scotland and barley was also a staple food.

And last, of Allane to conclude,
He is bening, courtas and gude,
And servis us of our daily fude,
And that with liberalitie,
Quhy sowld nocht Allane honorit be?

== Related works ==
- Quha Hes Gud Malt And Makis Ill Drynk, another poem in the Bannatyne Manuscript which discusses the drinking of ale
- John Barleycorn, a folksong from England with a similar theme
