= Alexander Scott (16th-century poet) =

Alexander Scott (Scots: Sanderris Scott: 1520? – 1582/1583) was a Scottish Court poet. He is believed to have spent most of his time in or near Edinburgh. Thirty-six short poems are attributed to him, including Ane New Yeir Gift to Quene Mary, The Rondel of Love, and a satire, Justing at the Drum. His poems are included in the Bannatyne Manuscript (1568) complied by George Bannatyne. According to an older view, "he has great variety of metre, and is graceful and musical, but his satirical pieces are often extremely coarse".

According to the modern viewpoint of the Oxford Dictionary of National Biography, "Because of its range, explicitness, and open-endedness, Scott's work has been described as ethically incoherent, but recent revisions of such essentialist readings have restored his multilayered texts as attractively complex poems, an appealing alternative to contemporary English poetry as anthologized in Tottel's Miscellany (1557)."
