= Ane New Yeir Gift to Quene Mary =

- by Alexander Scott
- Country: Scotland
- Publication date: 1562
- Lines: 224

Ane New Yeir Gift to Quene Mary is a poem written by Alexander Scott (1520?-1582/1583) in 1562, as a New Year's gift to Mary, Queen of Scots. Mary had recently returned to Scotland from France following the death of her first husband, Francois II of France (d.1560). The poem was written in an effort to placate Mary's displeasure following her official reception into the City of Edinburgh organised by its burgh council in August 1561, at which Protestant imagery was highlighted. As a committed Catholic Mary had taken offence.

During her absence in France, Scotland had undergone a Protestant Reformation in 1559–1560, against Mary's wishes and those of her mother, Marie de Guise, Regent of Scotland (d.1560). The imagery used in her formal entry into Edinburgh was deliberately used to impress the authority claimed by the reformed kirk over the practice of religion in Scotland. Scott's poem was designed to redress the bluntness of the royal entry's message, suggesting a more moderate middle way in the interest of the 'common weill' of the realm. It contained a 'mixture of advice to and support of Mary'. That Scott was able to do this suggests his status and the recognition by the court and the burgh of him as someone suitable to articulate this advice to the young queen.

On New Year's day 1562 Mary travelled from Holyrood Palace to Seton Palace, and perhaps the poem was presented at the home of a leading courtier and her Master of Requests, George Seton, 7th Lord Seton.

'Ane New Yeir Gift' is Scott's longest poem at 224 lines, and it is written in Middle Scots. It is a lyrical poem in 28 stanzas of 8 lines each. It starts in a suitably deferential and laudatory manner addressing Mary (text modernised):

'Welcome! illustrious lady, and our queen;/ Welcome! our lion with the fleur de lis;/ Welcome! our thistle with the Lorraine green;/ Welcome! our ruby rose upon the stem;/ Welcome! our precious and joyful mother;/ Welcome! our flame of Albion to bear;/ Welcome! our pleasant princess, most prized;/ God give your Grace against this good new year.'

The poem expresses hopes for marriage and the arrival of an heir, as well as a period of peace following the religious and political upheavals of preceding years. It also refers to efforts to resolve disputes and includes references to the Church of Scotland. The poem was written in Older Scots.

It has been preserved in the Bannatyne Manuscript, a large manuscript collection of mainly Scottish poetry compiled around 1568. The Bannatyne MS Project is currently in the process of digitising this long manuscript.
