= Auchtermuchty Town House =

Municipal building in Auchtermuchty, Scotland

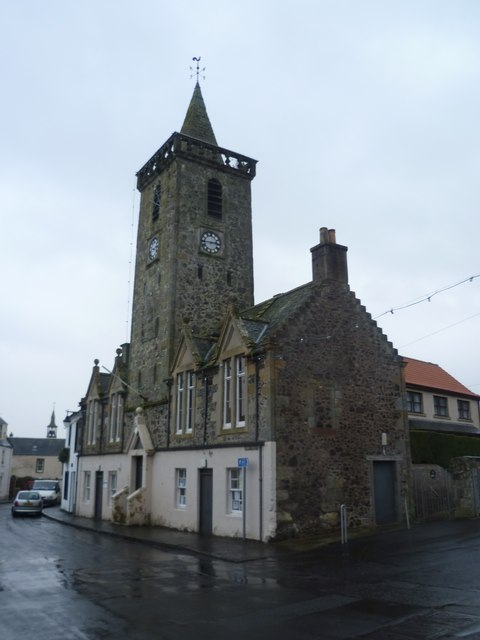
- Auchtermuchty Town House

- Shown in Fife
- 56.2919°N 3.2326°W
- Location: High Street, Auchtermuchty

History
- Built: 1729

Site notes
- Architectural style: Scottish medieval style

Listed Building – Category B
- Official name: Auchtermuchty Town House and Council Chambers, High Street
- Designated: 18 August 1972
- Reference no.: LB21372

Auchtermuchty Town House is a municipal structure in the High Street, Auchtermuchty, Fife, Scotland. The structure, which accommodates the local public library, is a Category B listed building.

== History ==
The town of Auchtermuchty was granted a charter by James IV of Scotland in 1517: the charter gave the burgh council the right to erect a tolbooth but it seems that a purpose-built structure was not contemplated until the early 18th century. At that time the burgh leaders decided that the lack of a traditional tolbooth was "uneasy and troublesome".

The new building was designed in the Scottish medieval style, built in rubble masonry and was completed in 1729. The design involved a symmetrical main frontage of seven bays facing the High Street. The central bay was formed by a tall three-stage tower: there was a doorway flanked by pilasters supporting a triangular fanlight in the first stage, three pairs of lancet windows in the second stage and a belfry with louvres in the third stage. The tower was surmounted by a parapet, a spire and a weather vane. The wings flanking the tower contained doorways in the central bays on either side and were originally fenestrated by sash windows on both floors. Internally, the principal rooms were the prison cells on the ground floor and the council chamber on the first floor.

In the early 19th century, after commissioning four new bridges across the Calsay Burn, the burgh council got into financial difficulties and declared itself bankrupt; the borough treasurer, John Beverage, who had signed a personal guarantee in favour of the bank, was imprisoned as a debtor in the town house for nearly three weeks in May 1818. He subsequently sued the members of the local masonic lodge, who had asked for his incarceration, for damages of £5,000. After the numbers of persons being held in the cells reduced in the 1820s and 1830s, the ground floor was converted for retail use and, in the second half of the 19th century the first floor windows were replaced by bi-partite mullioned windows which were surmounted by gables and finials. A new bell, cast by John Warner & Sons of London, was installed in the tower in 1874 and new clock faces were added in 1897.

The building continued to serve as the headquarters of the burgh council for much of the 20th century, but ceased to be the local seat of government when the enlarged North-East Fife District Council was formed in 1975. The building was subsequently converted for use as the local public library. A detailed map of the town, prepared by the Dundee architect, George Jamieson, in 1883, which had been re-discovered in an antiques shop in Cupar, was returned to the people of Auchtermuchty and placed on a wall in the library in March 2019.

== See also ==
- List of listed buildings in Auchtermuchty, Fife
