= Wilson Dobie Wilson =

Scottish antiquary, author and traveller (1803–1838)

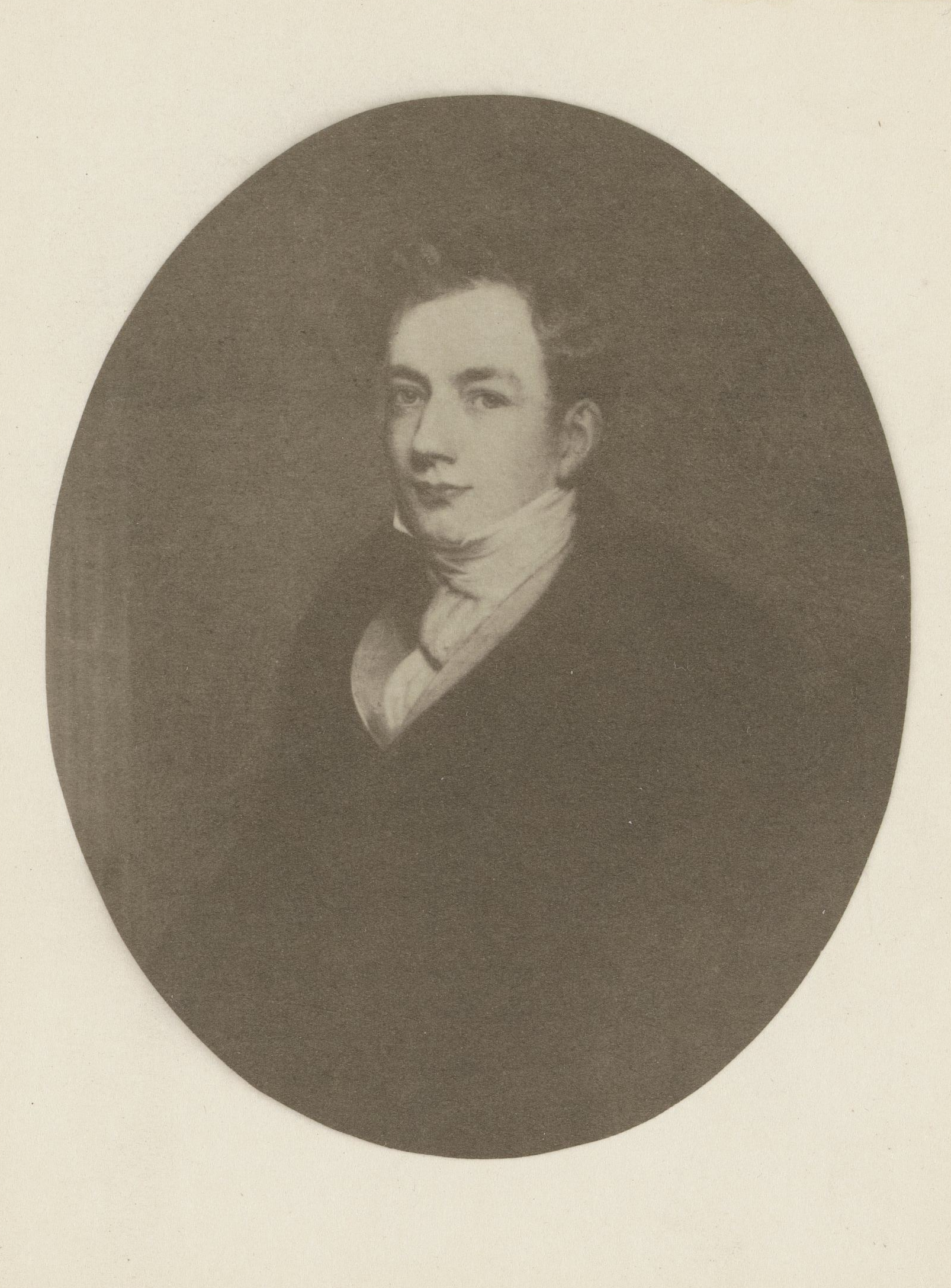
Portrait of Wilson Dobie Wilson from Memoir of William Wilson of Crummock, from a portrait by James Tannock, taken in 1823, when Wilson was 20

Wilson Dobie Wilson FRSE FSA (Scot) (30 November 1803 – 1 June 1838) was a nineteenth-century Scottish writer, editor and traveller. He was a member of the Maitland Club council, and a member of the Honourable Faculty of Advocates though he did not practise.

He lived in Gleverebach.

== Family ==
Wilson was christened Wilson Dobie - Wilson for his mother's surname, seventh child of James Dobie, and Janet Wilson, eldest daughter of William Wilson. His older brother, James Dobie FSA (Scot) (d. 1819), writer and bank agent, married Margaret Shedden.

Wilson took the additional surname Wilson from "his maternal uncle, Robert Wilson, M.D., of Chapel Place, Cavendish Square, London, for many years Resident Surgeon in the Presidency of Bengal and at Oude," when he died and Wilson "succeeded to his fortune, by destination and royal sign manual.

Wilson married Georgiana Summer, daughter of John Bird Sumner, then Bishop of Chester (later Archbishop of Canterbury). They had one son, Robert Dobie, barrister, and one daughter, Mary who died in 1851.

== Life ==
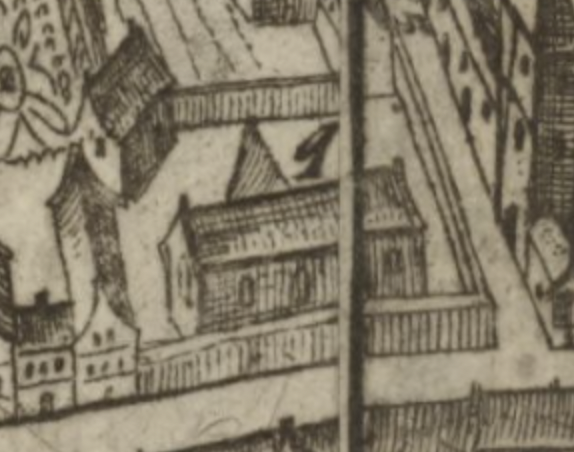
Lady Yester's Kirk, Edinburgh, on James Gordon of Rothiemay's 1647 map

Wilson was born at Granglevale, near Beith on 30 November 1803. He inherited a "very handsome fortune" in April 1822. He studied at the University of Edinburgh, where he lived with Rev. Dr. Thomas Fleming, minister of Lady Yester's Kirk.

He travelled widely in Europe, visiting natural and scenic landmarks, as well as centres of ancient and contemporary art. On his return he became a member of the Honourable Faculty of Advocates.

He retired to Glenarbarch, a "delightfully romantic" house on the Clyde in Dunbartonshire. Here he studied extensively building a substantial library. He was especially concerned with French literature and the Anglos-Saxon language. His favourite subjects of research were antiquities and history of Scotland.

== Death ==
Wilson died suddenly in Grangevale, in 1838.

== Bibliography ==
- Description of an Ancient Cross: at Kilmory in Argyleshire (1839)

== Bookplates ==
Five bookplates are listed in the Augustus Wollaston Franks collection held by the British Museum, items 52153-7. Four are described as armorial and one as pictorial armorial, the first and last by William Home Lizars. The bearings are described as Wilson quartering Dobie. The Society of Antiquaries of London lists a number of bookplates in the Charles Hall Crouch collection of bookplates.
