= Auchtermuchty =

Town in Fife, Scotland

Coordinates: 56.289754°N 3.237450°W

Auchtermuchty: Scottish Gaelic: Uachdar Mucadaidh; Scots: Auchtermuchtie, Muchtie
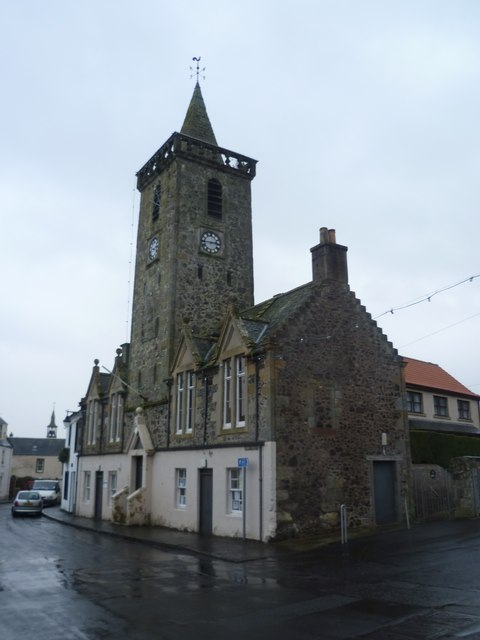
- Auchtermuchty Town House

- Location within Fife
- Population: 2,042 (2022)
- OS grid reference: NO235115
- Council area: Fife
- Lieutenancy area: Fife
- Country: Scotland
- Sovereign state: United Kingdom
- Post town: CUPAR
- Postcode district: KY14
- Dialling code: 01337
- Police: Scotland
- Fire: Scottish
- Ambulance: Scottish
- UK Parliament: North East Fife
- Scottish Parliament: North East Fife

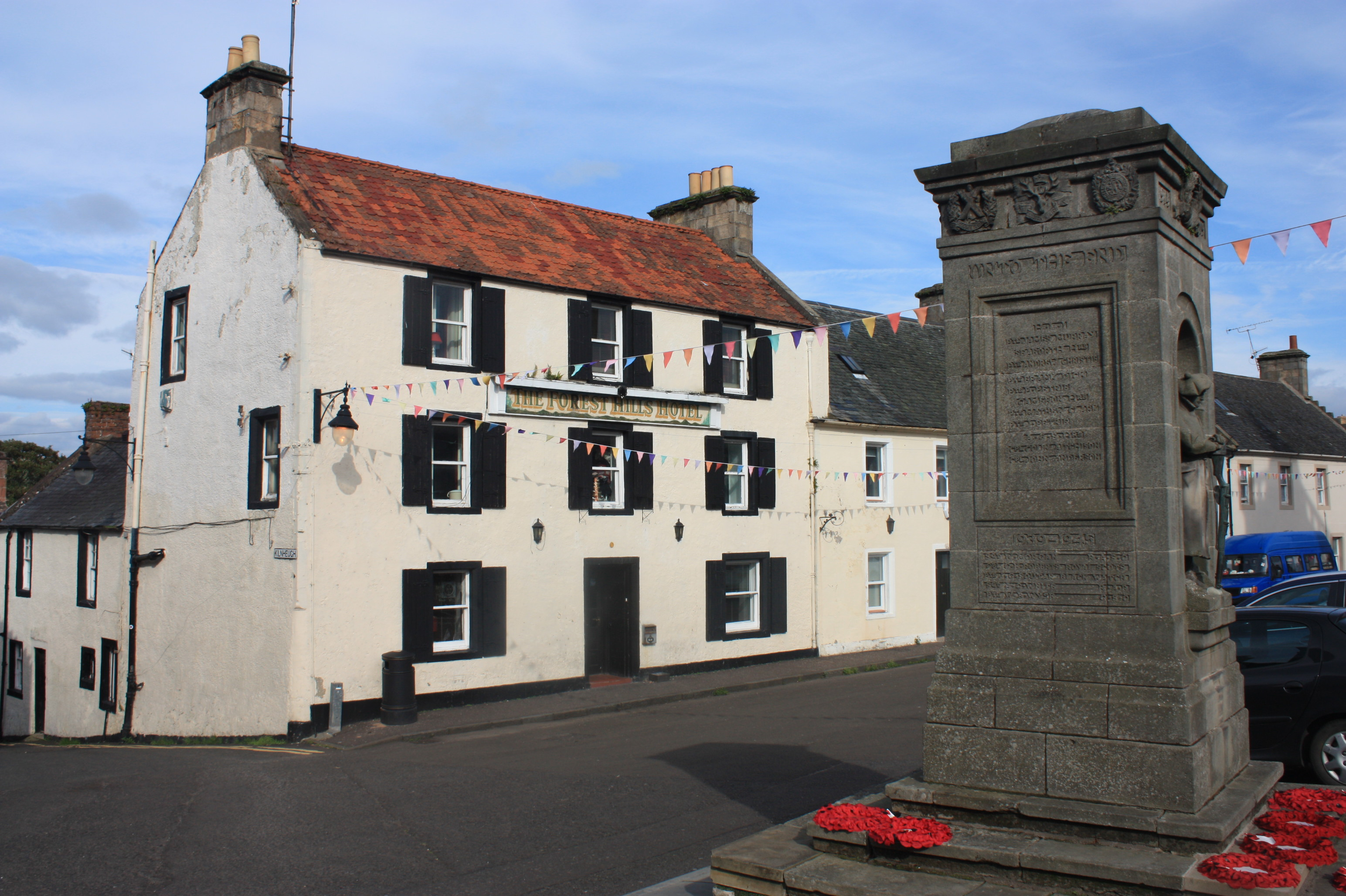
Auchtermuchty war memorial in the old market square (by Reginald Fairlie)

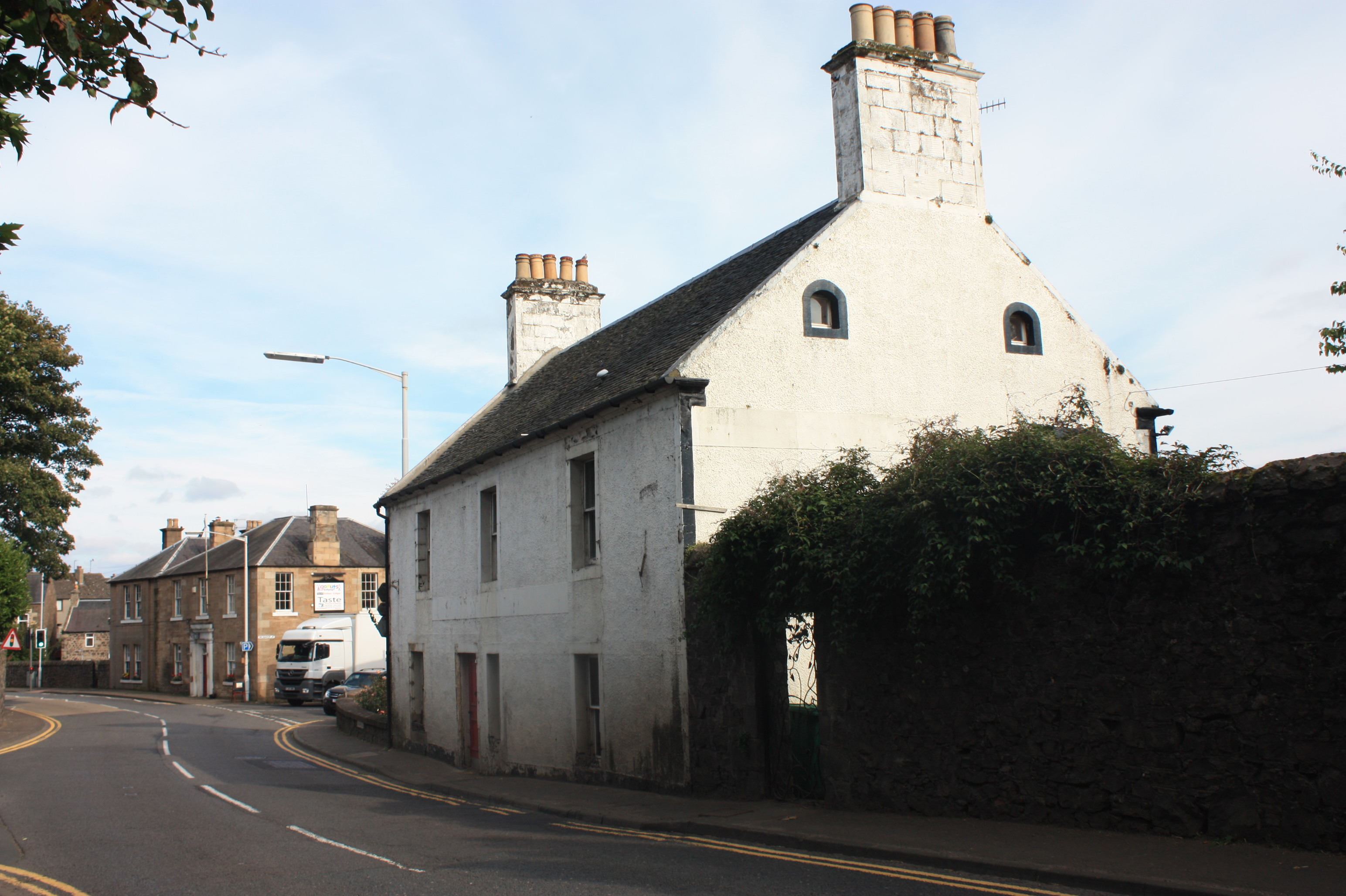
The former hotel in Auchtermuchty was a roadside coaching inn c.1750

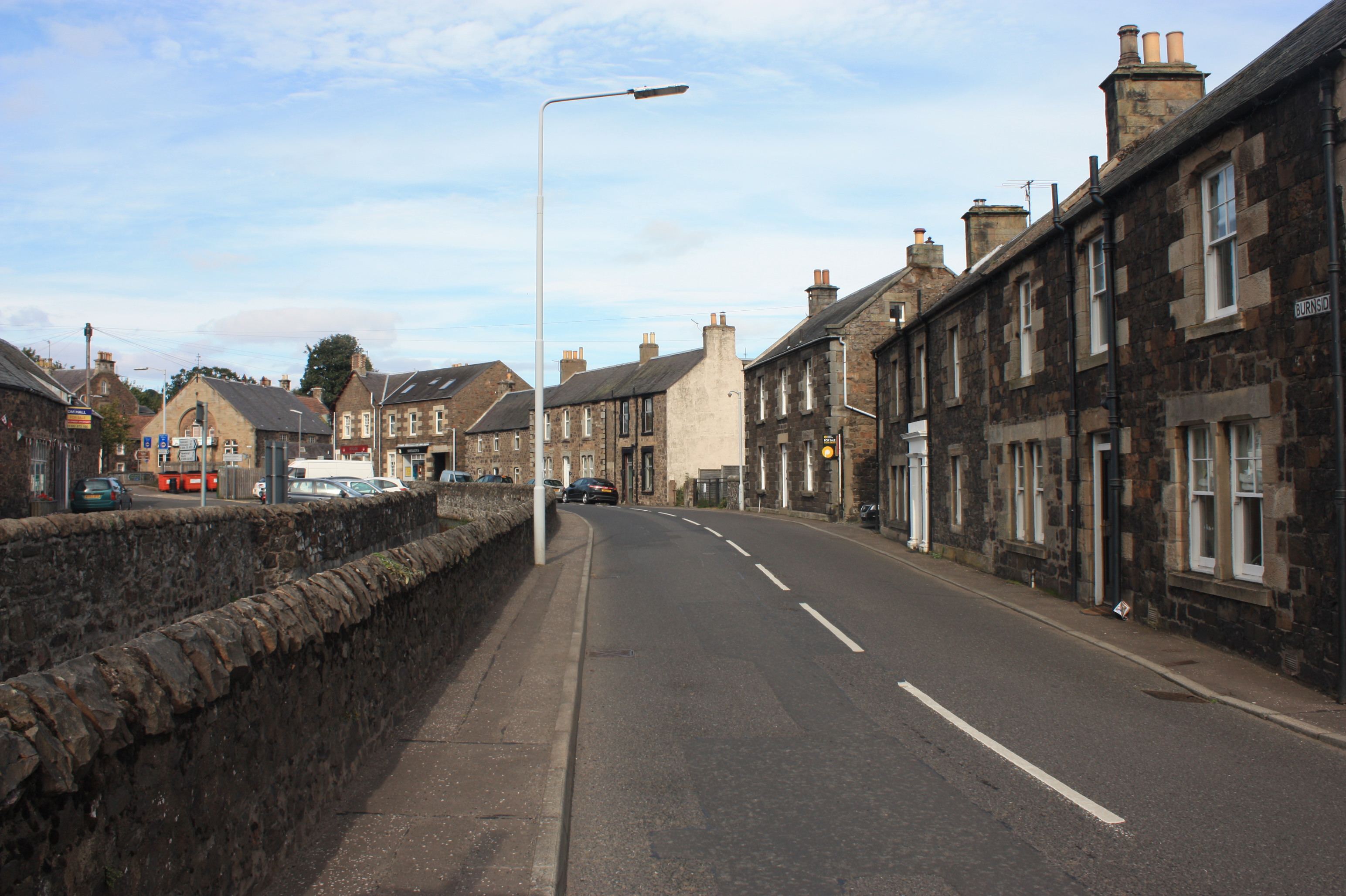
The southern part of old Auchtermuchty

Auchtermuchty (/ˌɔːxtərˈmʌxti/; Scottish Gaelic: Uachdar Mucadaidh, 'upland of the pigs/boar') is a historic market town and royal burgh in Fife, Scotland. It is beside Pitlour Hill, and is approximately 23 miles (37 km) north of Edinburgh, 49 miles (79 km) northeast of Glasgow, and 9 miles (14 km) north of Glenrothes. It had a population of 2,042 in 2022.

== History ==
Until 1975 Auchtermuchty was a royal burgh, established under charter of King James V in 1517. There is evidence of human habitation in the area dating back over 2,000 years, and the Romans are known to have established a camp in the southeast corner of the town. In the past, the linen industry was a major source of work in the town, but in the early 18th century the firm of John White was established, bringing the town its first foundry (there were two eventually). The town also had a distillery – Stratheden Whisky Distillery, set in the town centre – from 1829 to 1926, but it had to close when Prohibition in the United States drastically reduced the demand for its products. The town nowadays is a quiet but thriving community, situated in the Scottish countryside, where there are several local recreational footpaths. There is a modest range of local industry, but most people of working age travel out of the town for employment.

There was a town festival held each year in August, but this has now ceased.

As in many parts of Fife, there is much evidence of the impact of both World Wars on the village. To the North East of the town, a concrete observation platform was built on what is thought to be a long used site of strategical and defensive importance, as it overlooks the entire village and the remains of earlier walls and structures are evident. During the Second World War the flat farmland of the glacial valley in which Auchtermuchty sits made a prime target for glider landings in the event of an invasion, and it may still be possible to see the remains of trenches dug and obstacles built to prevent this, though these have largely been erased by farming throughout Fife.

== Buildings ==
The old part of the town is based around a hill. The twisting streets here have a wealth of buildings dating from the 17th and 18th century, centred on a medieval peel tower (now forming part of the town library).

The church (on the east side of the hill) is a simple Georgian box chapel, but with an interesting double bell within its western bellcote. Gravestones date back to the 17th century. A more modern cemetery dating from around 1910 lies to the south-east of the town, partly concealed by industrial units. Maps from the mid-19th century show no less than five churches in use at one time.

The town war memorial is of note, and is an unusual design by the architect Reginald Fairlie, portraying a Scottish soldier with head bowed, rather than the triumphant and victorious figures of other memorials in neighbouring villages, reflecting the huge loss of the village during the Great War.

== Amenities ==
Auchtermuchty Golf Club (now defunct) was founded in 1902. The club ceased to exist following WW2.

== In popular culture ==
Auchtermuchty was the setting for The Wife of Auchtermuchty, a comic Scots poem of the late Middle Ages.

The town was used as the location for Tannochbrae in the 1990s ITV series Dr. Finlay.

The town's church is mentioned in James Hogg's The Private Memoirs and Confessions of a Justified Sinner, as was Herald Law, a hill to the north if the village, in an area known historically as "The Holy Land".

In The Family Ness theme song, You'll Never Find A Nessie In The Zoo, the refrain states "You can go to Auchtermuchty and to Drumnadrochit too, but you'll never find a Nessie in the zoo".

Auchtermuchty was often referred to by John Junor in the Sunday Express: "John Junor's editorial approach was simple: articulate the fears and preoccupations of Middle England and liven them up with dollops of hokey Scottish folk wisdom. In his column for the paper, Junor lit upon the small Scottish town of Auchtermuchty and made it into his own personal Brigadoon, a place of solemn courtesy to one's betters and implacable hostility to outsiders."

Auchtermuchty is mentioned in a song from the album Legends from Beyond the Galactic Terrorvortex by symphonic metal band Gloryhammer.

In a popular 1999 beer advertisement, an actor plays a tourist wearing a foxtail cap, explaining, "When I told the folks back home I was coming to Auchtermuchty, they said wear the fox hat" (which sounds like "Where the fuck's that"). Ten years later, the town hosted its first "Wear The Fox Hat" comedy festival.

== Notable people ==
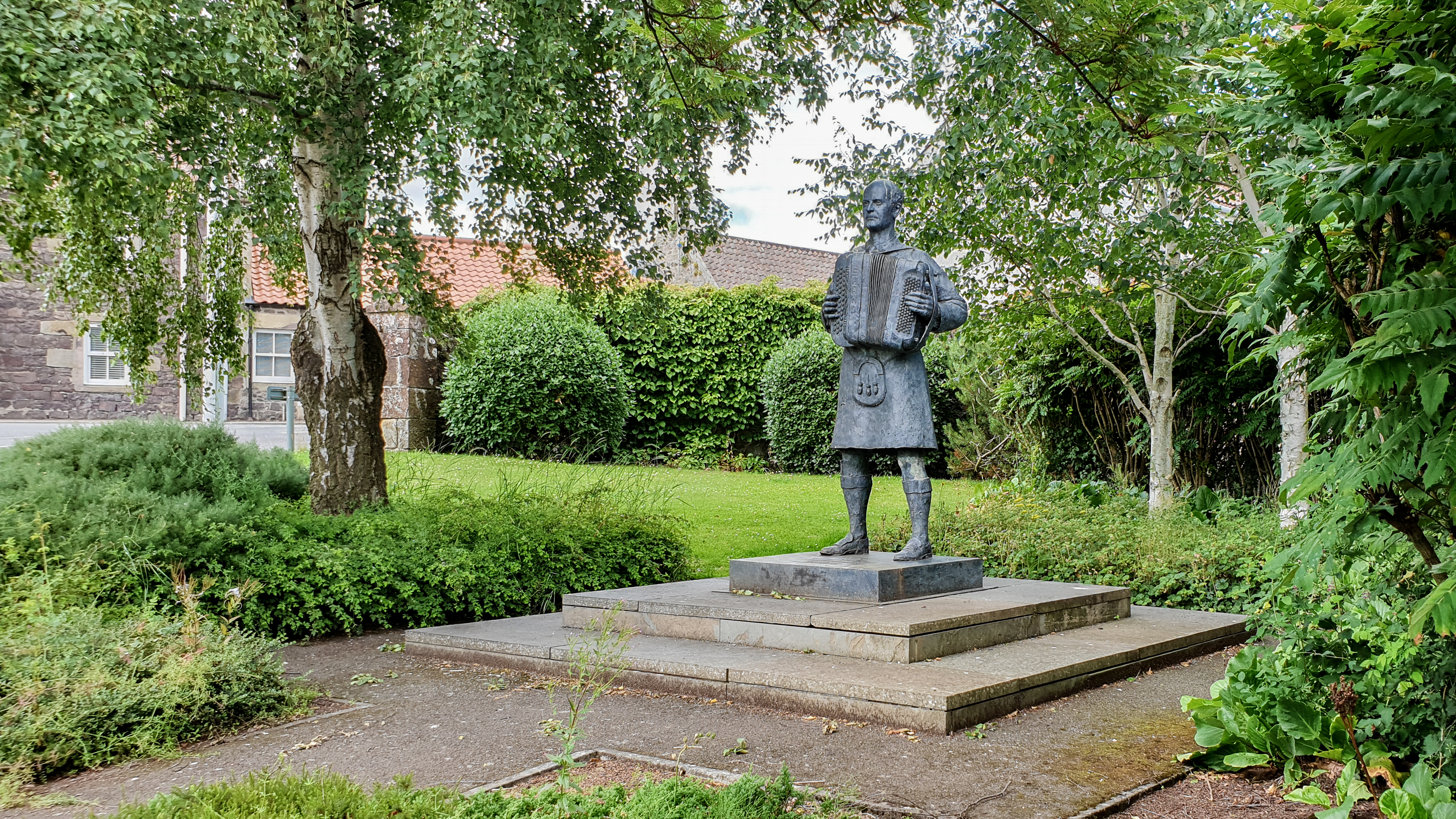
Statue of Jimmy Shand in Auchtermuchty

- Sir John Arnott, MP and founder of Arnotts department stores in Dublin
- James Ferrier, 4th Mayor of Montréal, Canada
- John Glas, founder of the Glasite religious sect
- Marian Leven, artist
- Captain George Moodie, first captain of the clipper ship Cutty Sark, lived his final years in Auchtermuchty
- Charlie and Craig Reid (born 1962), musicians and founders of folk/rock group The Proclaimers
- Sir Jimmy Shand (1908–2000), folk musician
- Dr John Shoolbred (1766–1831), naval surgeon
- James Campbell Walker, architect
- Stan Patterson Four times Uckers World Champion

== See also ==
- List of places in Fife
