= George Bannatyne =

Scottish merchant and collector of Scottish poems (1545–1608)

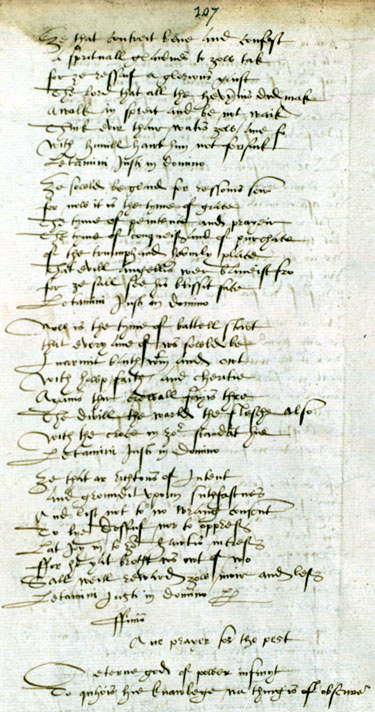
A page from The Bannatyne Manuscript. (National Library of Scotland)

George Bannatyne (1545–1608), a native of Angus, Scotland, was an Edinburgh merchant and burgess. He was the seventh of twenty-three children, including Catherine Bannatyne, born of James Bannatyne of Kirktown of Newtyle in Forfarshire and Katherine Tailefer. He is most famous as a collector of Scottish poems. He compiled an anthology of Scots poetry while in isolation during a plague in 1568. His work extended to eight hundred folio pages, divided into five parts. The anthology includes works from Scottish Chaucerians as well as many anonymous writers.

== The Bannatyne manuscript ==
Bannatyne began compiling his manuscript in 1568 while isolated in his home in Edinburgh during an outbreak of the plague. He was inspired to create the anthology as a means to preserve Scottish Literary heritage.

The Bannatyne Manuscript is, with the Asloan and Maitland manuscripts, one of the great sources of Middle Scots literature. It contains many works by Henryson, Dunbar, Lyndsay, Alexander Scott and Alexander Montgomerie.

The document was passed by Bannatyne to his descendants, Janet and her husband George Foulis of Woodhall and Ravelston, and then, via several private owners, to the Advocates' Library of Edinburgh. It is now held by the National Library of Scotland.

== The Bannatyne Club ==
The Bannatyne Club was founded by Sir Walter Scott in honour of George Bannatyne for the purpose of promoting and studying Scottish history and literature.

== Recent Scholarship ==
More recent scholarship on the Bannatyne Manuscript suggests an earlier date of 1565 for its composition. 9A. A. MacDonald, 'The Bannatyne Manuscript: a Marian Anthology', IR xxxvii (1986), 36–47) demonstrate this and Michael Lynch points out that its compilation at this time was appropriate given that it contains a great deal of love poetry and was put together at the time of the royal marriage between Mary I and Lord Darnley. Lynch, M. A New History of Scotland, Pimlico, 1991, p. 213.
