= Bannatyne Manuscript =

16th-century Scots anthology

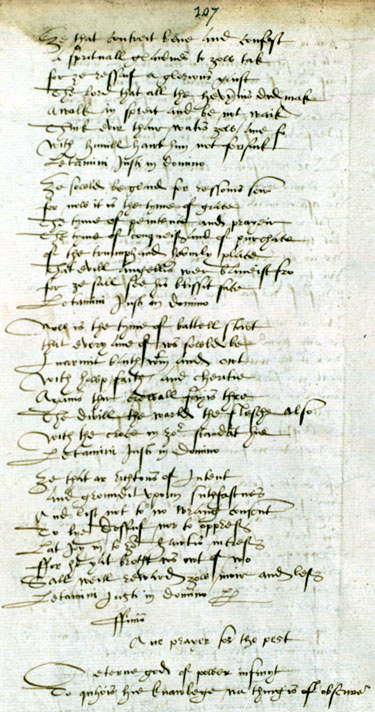
A page from The Bannatyne Manuscript. (National Library of Scotland) At the foot of the page is the opening of Henryson's Ane Prayer for the Pest.

The Bannatyne Manuscript is an anthology of literature compiled in Scotland in the sixteenth century. It is an important source for the Scots poetry of the fifteenth and sixteenth centuries. The manuscript contains texts of the poems of the great makars, many anonymous Scots pieces and works by medieval English poets.

== History ==
It was collected in 1568 by the Edinburgh merchant George Bannatyne when he was isolated in his home, escaping the plague that had reached Edinburgh. Bannatyne was motivated by his desire to preserve Scottish literary heritage when compiling this anthology and also included some of his own writing in the manuscript. Contrary to popular claims, it is not the earliest surviving record of the word "fuck".

According to the text of the manuscript itself, it represents;

Ane most godlie mirrie and lustie rapsodie made be sundrie learned Scots poets and written be George Bannatyne in the tyme of his youth.

A note in the manuscript records that it was presented by William Foulis of Woodhall, a descendant of Bannatyne, to William Carmichael of Skirling in 1712.

In the early Eighteenth Century, Allan Ramsay reproduced pieces from the manuscript in his compilation The Ever Green between 1724 and 1727.

The manuscript was acquired by the Advocates' Library of Edinburgh in 1772.

Walter Scott took an interest in the document and participated in an eponymous club dedicated to the study and publication of historic Scots literature. The first printed transcript of the manuscript was published by the Bannatyne Club, in three volumes, between 1827 and 1855.

The Hunterian Club published a new transcript in 1896.

The manuscript is now held by the National Library of Scotland with the shelfmark Adv.MS.1.1.6. A digital version of the manuscript is available to view online.

== Contents ==
The Bannatyne Manuscript is currently bound as two volumes, with each leaf mounted separately. Volume I comprising 192 leaves is paginated 1–385, while volume II comprising 205 leaves is paginated 387–795. The volumes were rebound in 19th-century green morocco.

The Bannatyne Manuscript was divided by its compiler into five principal sections. It also contains a series of unclassified appendices which were partly written by scribes other than Bannatyne himself.

=== Ballattis Of Theologie ===
The first section contains pieces with a religious theme, many of which predate the Reformation.

It includes Robert Henryson's "Ane Prayer for the Pest", Alexander Scott's translations of the first and fifty-first psalms, William Dunbar's "The Tabill Of Confessioun", "Rorate Celi Desuper" and "Done Is A Battell On The Dragon Blak" and John Lydgate's "O Creaturis Creat{sic} Of Me Your Creator."

=== Verry Singular Ballatis, full of Wisdome And Moralitie Etc. ===
The "Secound Pairt" of the manuscript contains poems with moral or philosophical themes. Among the pieces in the section are Henrysons's "The Abbay Walk", "The Ressoning Betwix Aige and Yowth", "The Ressoning Betwix Deth and Man" and "The Praise of Age".

Dunbar's work is well-represented by "All Erdly Joy Returnis In Pane", "Of Manis Mortalitie", "Tydings Fra The Sessioun", "A General Satire", "Of Deming", "Of Covetyce", "Rewl Of Anis Self", "None May Assure In This Warld", "Schir Yet Remembir As Of Befoir", and the trilogy consisting of "Of Discretioun In Asking", "Of Discretioun In Geving" and "Of Discretioun in Taking".

The second section also contains the prologue to the ninth book of Gavin Douglas' Eneados and Alexander Scott's "Ane New Yeir Gift to Quene Mary".

=== Ballettis Mirry, And Uther Solatius Consaittis, Set Furth Be Divers Ancient Poyettis ===
The third section of the manuscript is dedicated to comic entertainment with a heavy bias toward satire.

It includes a largely-complete text of Sir David Lyndsay's Ane Satyre of the Thrie Estaitis. Bannatyne records performances of Lyndsay's play at Cupar, Fife, on 7 June 1552, and at Greenside, near Edinburgh, in 1554.

Scott's work is represented by "The Slicht Remeid Of Luve", "Ane Ballat Maid To The Derisioun And Scorne Of Wantoun Wemen", "The Justing And Debait Up At The Drum" and "Of May".

William Dunbar's poetry dominates the section. Among the works of his to be included are "Best To Be Blyth", The Dregy Of Dunbar, Lament for the Makaris, "The Dance Of The Seven Deadly Sins", "My Panefull Purs So Priclis Me", "The Wowing Of The King Quhen He Was In Dunfermeling", The Fenyeit Freir of Tungland, "The Birth Of Antichrist", The Twa Cummeris, The Flyting of Dumbar and Kennedie and "The Testament Of Master Andro Kennedy".

"The Thrid Pairt" also contains The Wife of Auchtermuchty, "Kynd Kittock", How The First Helandman of God Was Maid, "Christis Kirk On The Green" and Quhy Sowld Nocht Allane Honorit Be.

Three poems in this section address specific women: Margaret Fleming, Grisel 'Crissell' Sandilands, and Jonet Reid, all of which are attributed to Robert Sempill.

=== Ballatis Of Luve Devydit in Four Pairtis ===
Bannatyne divided this section into four subsections:

- "Songis Of Luve"
- "Contemptis Of Luve and Evill Wemen"
- "Contempis Of Evill Fals Vicius Men"
- "Ballatis Detesting Of Luve And Lichery"

Most of the poems in the section are anonymous. Alexander Scott's poetry is predominant among the named poets.

The section contains Dunbar's "Gude Counsale", "Bewty And The Presoneir", "Of The Lady Solistaris At Court","In Prais Of Wemen", "Quha Will Behald Of Luve The Chance" and "Inconstancy Of Luve". Henryson is represented by "The Garment of Gud Ladeis" and Douglas by the prologue to the fourth book of The Eneados.

=== Contenyng The Fabillis Of Esop, With Diverss Uther Fabillis And Poeticall Works ===
The "Fyift Pairt" of the manuscript is given over to fables and other allegories. Ten of Henryson's Morall Fabillis are included alongside the same author's Orpheus and Euridice, "Robene And Makyne" and "The Bludy Serk".

Dunbar is represented by "The Goldyn Targe" and The Thrissil and the Rois.

The fifth section also contains The Howlat, "The Freiris Of Berwick" and "Colkelbie Sow".

=== Appendices ===
The manuscript's appendices, often written by anonymous scribes other than Bannatyne, contain works which are not classified according to the compiler's five-part scheme.

Alexander Montgomerie is represented by several poems including "Lyk as the dum Solsequium". Dunbar's "In vice most vicius he excelsis" is also included.

A poem added to the appendices by Allan Ramsay in 1726 pays tribute to the poetry of the Bannatyne Manuscript and records his use of it in compiling "The Ever Green" of 1724, while borrowed from Carmichael of Skirling. It would be the last addition to the manuscript.

In Seventeen hundred twenty-four,
Did Allan Ramsay keen,
gather from this book that store,
Which fills his Ever Green.

Thrice fifty and sax towmonds neat,
Frae when it was colected,
Let worthy poets hope good fate,
Throw time they'll be respected.

Fashions of words and witt may change,
And rob in part their fame,
And make them to dull fops look strange,
But sense is still the same.

And will bleez bright in that clear mind,
That loves the antient strains,
Like good Carmichael, patron kind,
To whom this book pertains.

== People associated with the manuscript ==
=== Catherine Bannatyne ===
Catherine Bannatyne, a Scottish noblewoman who lived during the late fifteenth and early sixteenth century and was the sister of George Bannatyne, may have been part of the collection's original audience. Prosopographers believe this to be the case because her husband's name is included in an appendix of relatives and acquaintances that George attached to the manuscript. Catherine was the daughter of James Bannatyne of Kirktown of Newtyle (1512–1584), a lawyer and burgess of Edinburgh. She was one of 23 children born to him and his first wife, Catherine Telfer (1522–1570). Catherine married William Stewart, and they had a son named Sir Lewis Stewart of Kirkhill. He became a servant to the royal Stewarts, and a collector of manuscripts.
