= Stocqueler =

Stocqueler is a surname. Notable people with the surname include:

- Edwin Roper Loftus Stocqueler (1829–1895), British artist
- Joachim Hayward Stocqueler (1801–1886), British journalist, author and lecturer with interests in the theatre and in Indian and military affairs
- Giovanna Sestini (married name Joanna Stocqueler, 1749–1814), Italian-born soprano singer
