= Literature in early modern Scotland =

Literature written in Scotland or by Scottish writers

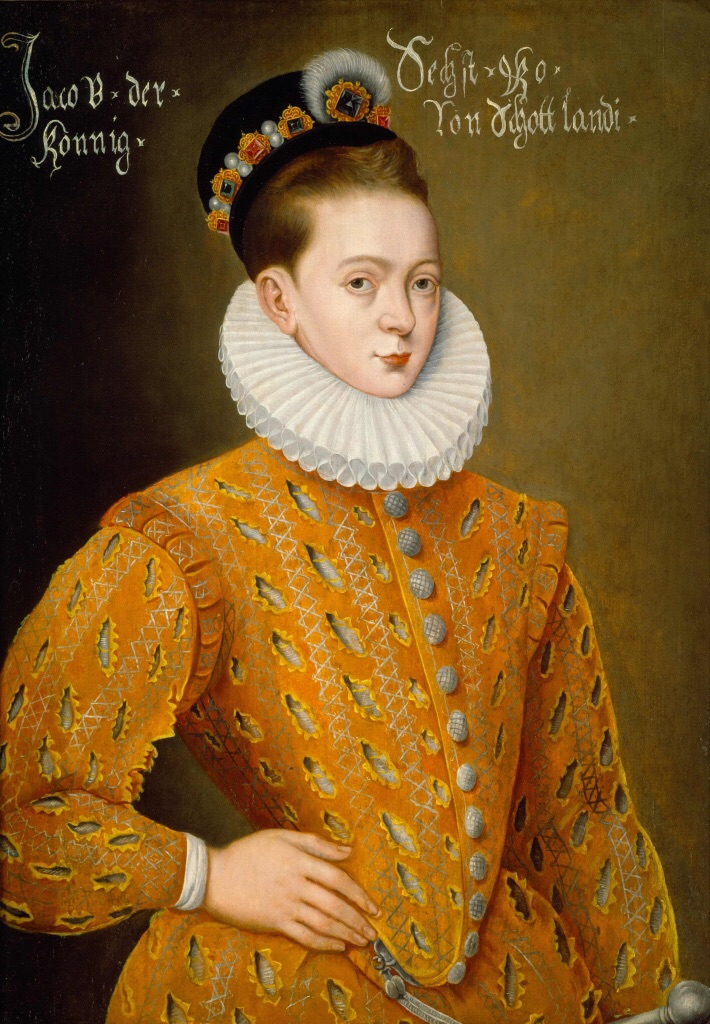
James VI in 1580, aged 14. A major patron of poetry as well as a poet and commentator, his accession to the English throne in 1603 had profound effects on the patronage of Scottish literature and the Scots language

Literature in early modern Scotland is literature written in Scotland or by Scottish writers between the Renaissance in the early sixteenth century and the beginnings of the Enlightenment and Industrial Revolution in mid-eighteenth century. By the beginning of this era Gaelic had been in geographical decline for three centuries and had begun to be a second-class language, confined to the Highlands and Islands, but the traditions of Bard poetry in the Classical Gaelic literary language continued to survive. Middle Scots became the language of both the nobility and the majority population. The establishment of a printing press in 1507 made it easier to disseminate Scottish literature and was probably aimed at bolstering Scottish national identity.

James IV's creation of a Renaissance court included the patronage of poets, or makars, who were mainly clerics. These included Gavin Douglas, whose Eneados (1513) was the first complete translation of a major classical text in an Anglian language. James V was also a major patron of poets. George Buchanan founded a tradition of neo-Latin poetry. In the reign of Mary, Queen of Scots and the minority of her son James VI, cultural pursuits were limited by the lack of a royal court and by political turmoil. The Kirk discouraged poetry that was not devotional in nature but secular poetry survived. In the 1580s and 1590s James VI promoted literature in Scots. He became patron and member of a loose circle of Scottish court poets and musicians, later called the Castalian Band. David Lyndsay's The Thrie Estaitis (1540) is the only complete play to survive from before the Reformation. Buchanan was major influence on Continental theatre, but his impact in Scotland was limited by his choice of Latin as a medium. There were isolated Scottish plays, but the system of professional companies of players and theatres that developed in England in this period was absent in Scotland.

The accession of James VI to the English throne in 1603 meant a loss of the court as a centre of patronage and he increasingly favoured the language of southern England. A number of Scottish poets accompanied the king to London, where they began to anglicise their written language. As the tradition of classical Gaelic poetry declined, a new tradition of vernacular Gaelic poetry began to emerge, often undertaken by women. The tradition of neo-Latin poetry reached its fruition with the publication of the anthology of the Deliciae Poetarum Scotorum (1637). This period was marked by the work of the first named female Scottish poets, such as Elizabeth Melville, whose Ane Godlie Dream (1603) was the first book published by a woman in Scotland. This was the period when the ballad emerged as a significant written form in Scotland. From the seventeenth century they were used as a literary form by aristocratic authors.

After the Union in 1707, the use of Scots was discouraged by many in authority and education. Allan Ramsay led a "vernacular revival" that laid the foundations of a reawakening of interest in older Scottish literature. He also led the trend for pastoral poetry and his pastoral opera The Gentle Shepherd was one of the most influential works of the era. Ramsay was part of a community of poets working in Scots and English. Tobias Smollett was a poet, essayist, satirist and playwright, but is best known for his picaresque novels, for which he is often seen as Scotland's first novelist. The early eighteenth century was also a period of innovation in Gaelic vernacular poetry that mixed traditional forms with influences from the Lowlands. Drama was pursued by Scottish playwrights in London. In Scotland drama was supplied by visiting English players and actors, but there were clashes with the Kirk. Ramsay was instrumental in establishing a small theatre in Edinburgh, but it closed soon after the passing of the 1737 Licensing Act. A new theatre was opened at Cannongate in 1747 and operated without a licence into the 1760s.

== Sixteenth century ==
=== Background ===
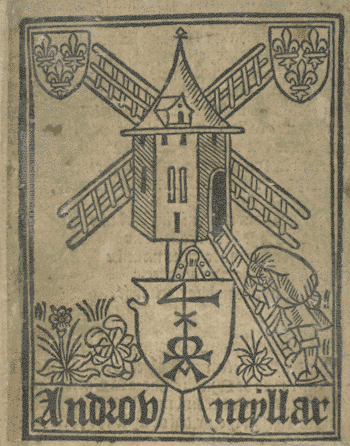
The device of the printer Andrew Myllar from The Porteous of Nobleness

By the early modern era Gaelic had been in geographical decline for three centuries and had begun to be a second class language, confined to the Highlands and Islands. The tradition of classic Gaelic poetry survived longer in Scotland than in Ireland, with the last fully competent member of the MacMhuirich dynasty, who were hereditary poets to the Lords of the Isles and then the Donalds of Clanranald, still working in the early eighteenth century. Nevertheless, interest in the sponsorship of panegyric Gaelic poetry was declining among the clan leaders. Gaelic was gradually being overtaken by Middle Scots, which became the language of both the nobility and the majority population. Middle Scots was derived substantially from Old English, with Gaelic and French influences. It was usually called Inglyshe and was very close to the language spoken in northern England, but by the sixteenth century it had established orthographic and literary norms largely independent of those developing in England. From the mid sixteenth century, written Scots was increasingly influenced by the developing Standard English of Southern England due to developments in royal and political interactions with England. With the increasing influence and availability of books printed in England, most writing in Scotland came to be done in the English fashion.

The establishment of a printing press under royal patent in 1507 would begin to make it easier to disseminate Scottish literature and was probably aimed at bolstering Scottish national identity. The first Scottish press was established in Southgait in Edinburgh by the merchant Walter Chepman (c. 1473–c. 1528) and the bookseller Andrew Myllar (fl. 1505–08). Although the first press was relatively short lived, beside law codes and religious works, the press also produced editions of the work of Scottish makars before its demise, probably about 1510. The next recorded press was that of Thomas Davidson (f. 1532–42), the first in a long line of "king's printers", who also produced editions of works of the makars.

=== Makars ===
James IV's (r. 1488–1513) creation of a Renaissance court included the patronage of poets. These court poets, or makars, who were mainly clerics included Robert Henryson (c. 1450-c. 1505), who re-worked Medieval and Classical sources, such as Chaucer and Aesop in works such as his Testament of Cresseid and The Morall Fabillis. William Dunbar (1460–1513) produced satires, lyrics, invectives and dream visions that established the vernacular as a flexible medium for poetry of any kind. Gavin Douglas (1475–1522), who became Bishop of Dunkeld, injected Renaissance humanism and Classics into his poetry. The landmark work in the reign of James IV was Douglas's version of Virgil's Aeneid, the Eneados. It was the first complete translation of a major classical text in an Anglian language, finished in 1513, but overshadowed by the disaster at Flodden that brought the reign to an end.

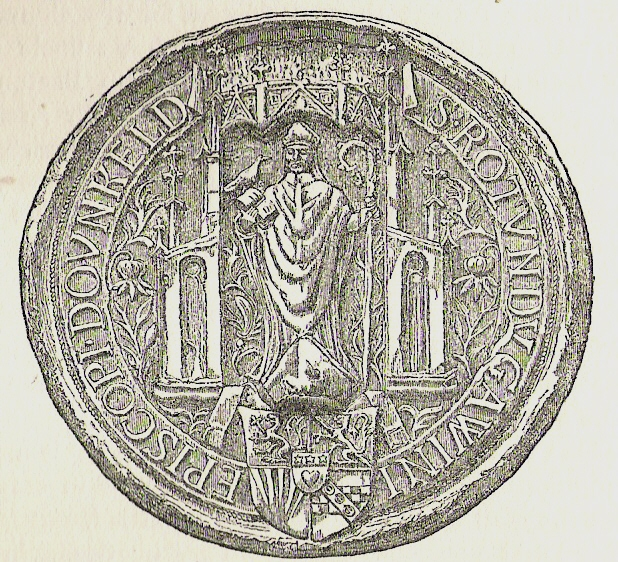
The seal of Gavin Douglas as Bishop of Dunkeld

As a patron of poets and authors James V (r. 1513–42) supported William Stewart and John Bellenden, who translated the Latin History of Scotland compiled in 1527 by Hector Boece, into verse and prose. David Lyndsay (c. 1486–1555), diplomat and the head of the Lyon Court, was a prolific poet. He wrote elegiac narratives, romances and satires. George Buchanan (1506–82) had a major influence as a Latin poet, founding a tradition of neo-Latin poetry that would continue in to the seventeenth century. Contributors to this tradition included royal secretary John Maitland (1537–95), reformer Andrew Melville (1545–1622), John Johnston (1570?–1611) and David Hume of Godscroft (1558–1629).

From the 1550s, in the reign of Mary, Queen of Scots (r. 1542–67) and the minority of her son James VI (r. 1567–1625), cultural pursuits were limited by the lack of a royal court and by political turmoil. The Kirk, heavily influenced by Calvinism, also discouraged poetry that was not devotional in nature. Nevertheless, poets from this period included Richard Maitland of Lethington (1496–1586), who produced meditative and satirical verses in the style of Dunbar; John Rolland (fl. 1530–75), who wrote allegorical satires in the tradition of Douglas and courtier and minister Alexander Hume (c. 1556–1609), whose corpus of work includes nature poetry and epistolary verse. Alexander Scott's (?1520–82/3) use of short verse designed to be sung to music, opened the way for the Castalian poets of James VI's adult reign.

Unlike many of his predecessors, James VI actively despised Gaelic culture. However, in the 1580s and 1590s he strongly promoted the literature of the country of his birth in Scots. His treatise, Some Rules and Cautions to be Observed and Eschewed in Scottish Prosody, published in 1584 when he was aged 18, was both a poetic manual and a description of the poetic tradition in his mother tongue, to which he applied Renaissance principles. He became patron and member of a loose circle of Scottish Jacobean court poets and musicians, later called the Castalian Band, which included William Fowler (c. 1560–1612), John Stewart of Baldynneis (c. 1545–c. 1605), and Alexander Montgomerie (c. 1550–98). They translated key Renaissance texts and produced poems using French forms, including sonnets and short sonnets, for narrative, nature description, satire and meditations on love. Later poets that followed in this vein included William Alexander (c. 1567–1640), Alexander Craig (c. 1567–1627) and Robert Ayton (1570–1627). By the late 1590s the king's championing of his native Scottish tradition was to some extent diffused by the prospect of inheriting of the English throne.

=== Dramatists ===
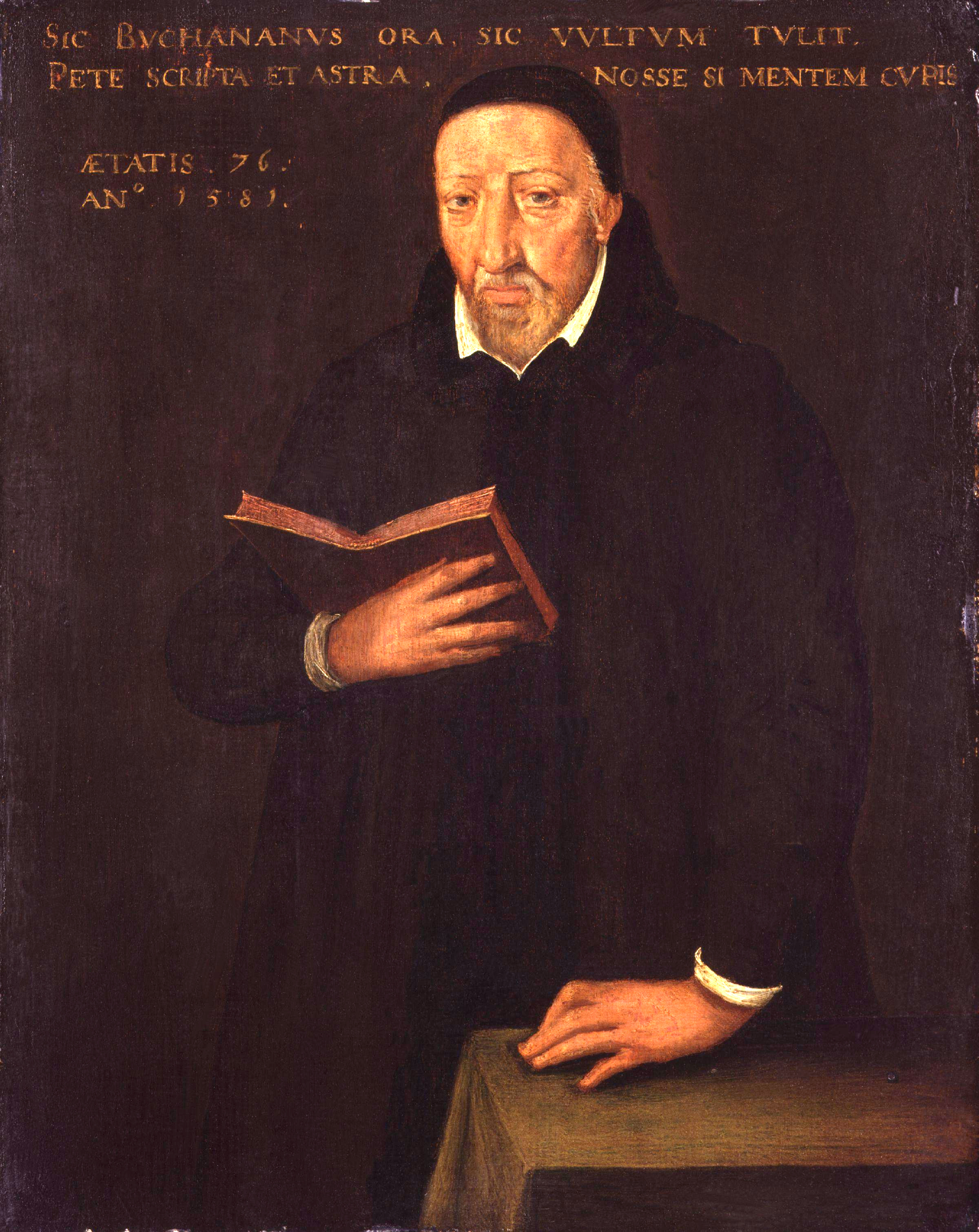
George Buchanan, playwright, poet and political theorist, by Arnold Bronckorst

Lyndsay produced an interlude at Linlithgow Palace for the king and queen thought to be a version of his play The Thrie Estaitis in 1540, which satirised the corruption of church and state, and which is the only complete play to survive from before the Reformation. Buchanan was major influence on Continental theatre with plays such as Jepheths and Baptistes, which influenced Pierre Corneille and Jean Racine and through them the neo-classical tradition in French drama, but his impact in Scotland was limited by his choice of Latin as a medium. The anonymous The Maner of the Cyring of ane Play (before 1568) and Philotus (published in London in 1603), are isolated examples of surviving plays. The latter is a vernacular Scots comedy of errors, probably designed for court performance for Mary, Queen of Scots or James VI.

James VI and his wife Anne of Denmark personally dressed in costume and took part in masques, performances at weddings that typically involved music, dance, and disguise. The system of professional companies of players and theatres that developed in England in this period was absent in Scotland, but James VI signalled his interest in drama by arranging for a company of English players to erect a playhouse and perform in 1599.

== Seventeenth century ==
=== Poetry ===
Having extolled the virtues of Scots "poesie", after his accession to the English throne, James VI increasingly favoured the language of southern England. In 1611 the Kirk adopted the English Authorised King James Version of the Bible. In 1617 interpreters were declared no longer necessary in the port of London because Scots and Englishmen were now "not so far different bot ane understandeth ane uther". Jenny Wormald described James as creating a "three-tier system, with Gaelic at the bottom and English at the top". The loss of the court as a centre of patronage in 1603 was a major blow to Scottish literature. A number of Scottish poets, including William Alexander, John Murray and Robert Aytoun, accompanied the king to London, where they continued to write, but they soon began to anglicise their written language. James's characteristic role as active literary participant and patron in the English court made him a defining figure for English Renaissance poetry and drama, which would reach a pinnacle of achievement in his reign, but his patronage for the high style in his own Scottish tradition largely became sidelined. The only significant court poet to continue to work in Scotland after the king's departure was William Drummond of Hawthornden (1585–1649).

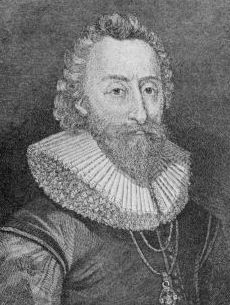
William Alexander, statesman and author

As the tradition of classical Gaelic poetry declined, a new tradition of vernacular Gaelic poetry began to emerge. While Classical poetry used a language largely fixed in the twelfth century, the vernacular continued to develop. In contrast to the Classical tradition, which used syllabic metre, vernacular poets tended to use stressed metre. However, they shared with the Classic poets a set of complex metaphors and role, as the verse was still often panegyric. A number of these vernacular poets were women, such as Mary MacLeod of Harris (c. 1615–1707).

The tradition of neo-Latin poetry reached its fruition with the publication of the anthology of the Deliciae Poetarum Scotorum (1637), published in Amsterdam by Arthur Johnston (c.1579–1641) and Sir John Scott of Scotstarvet (1585–1670) and containing work by the major Scottish practitioners since Buchanan. This period was marked by the work of the first named female Scottish poets. Elizabeth Melville's (f. 1585–1630) Ane Godlie Dream (1603) was a popular religious allegory and the first book published by a woman in Scotland. Anna Hume, daughter of David Hume of Godscroft, adapted Petrarch's Triumphs as Triumphs of Love: Chastitie: Death (1644).

This was the period when the ballad emerged as a significant written form in Scotland. Some ballads may date back to the late medieval era and deal with events and people that can be traced back as far as the thirteenth century, including "Sir Patrick Spens" and "Thomas the Rhymer", but which are not known to have existed until the eighteenth century. They were probably composed and transmitted orally and only began to be written down and printed, often as broadsides and as part of chapbooks, later being recorded and noted in books by collectors including Robert Burns and Walter Scott. From the seventeenth century they were used as a literary form by aristocratic authors including Robert Sempill (c. 1595-c. 1665), Lady Elizabeth Wardlaw (1627–1727) and Lady Grizel Baillie (1645–1746).

=== Theatre ===
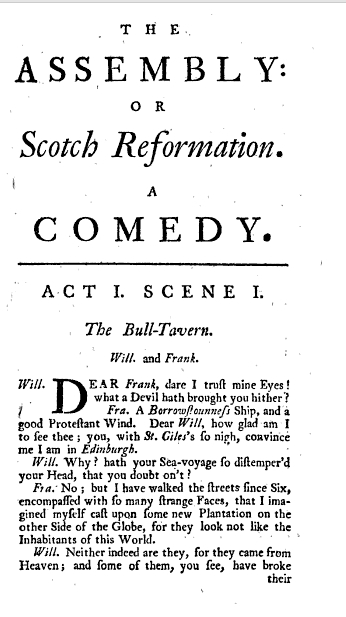
The first page of The Assembly by Archibald Pitcairne from the 1766 edition

The loss of a royal court also meant there was no force to counter the Kirk's dislike of theatre, which struggled to survive in Scotland. However, it was not entirely extinguished. The Kirk used theatre for its own purposes in schools and was slow to suppress popular folk dramas. Surviving plays for the period include William Alexander's Monarchicke Tragedies, written just before his departure with the king for England in 1603. They were closet dramas, designed to be read rather than performed, and already indicate Alexander's preference for southern English over the Scots language. There were some attempts to revive Scottish drama. In 1663 Edinburgh lawyer William Clerke wrote Marciano or the Discovery, a play about the restoration of a legitimate dynasty in Florence after many years of civil war. It was performed at the Tennis-Court Theatre at Holyrood Palace before the parliamentary high commissioner John Leslie, Earl of Rothes. Thomas Sydsurf's Tarugo's Wiles or the Coffee House, was first performed in London in 1667 and then in Edinburgh the year after and drew on Spanish comedy. A relative of Sydsurf, physician Archibald Pitcairne (1652–1713) wrote The Assembly or Scotch Reformation (1692), a ribald satire on the morals of the Presbyterian Kirk, circulating in manuscript, but not published until 1722, helping to secure the association between Jacobitism and professional drama that discouraged the creation of professional theatre.

== Early eighteenth century ==
=== Vernacular revival ===
After the Union in 1707 and the shift of political power to England, the use of Scots was discouraged by many in authority and education. Nevertheless, Scots remained the vernacular of many rural communities and the growing number of urban working-class Scots. Literature developed a distinct national identity and began to enjoy an international reputation. Allan Ramsay (1686–1758) was considered the most important literary figure of the era, often described as leading a "vernacular revival". He laid the foundations of a reawakening of interest in older Scottish literature, publishing The Ever Green (1724), a collection that included many major poetic works of the Stewart period. He led the trend for pastoral poetry, helping to develop the Habbie stanza, which would be later be used by Robert Burns as a poetic form. His Tea-Table Miscellany (1724–37) contained poems old Scots folk material, his own poems in the folk style and "gentilizings" of Scots poems in the English neo-classical style. His pastoral opera The Gentle Shepherd was one of the most influential works of the era. He would also play a leading role in supporting drama in Scotland and the attempt to found a permanent theatre in the capital.

=== Verse and prose ===
Ramsay was part of a community of poets working in Scots and English. These included William Hamilton of Gilbertfield (c. 1665–1751), Robert Crawford (1695–1733), Alexander Ross (1699–1784), the Jacobite William Hamilton of Bangour (1704–54), socialite Alison Rutherford Cockburn (1712–94), and poet and playwright James Thomson's (1700–48), most famous for the nature poetry of his Seasons. Tobias Smollett (1721–71) was a poet, essayist, satirist and playwright, but is best known for his picaresque novels, such as The Adventures of Roderick Random (1748) and The Adventures of Peregrine Pickle (1751) for which he is often seen as Scotland's first novelist. His work would be a major influence on later novelists such as Thackeray and Dickens.

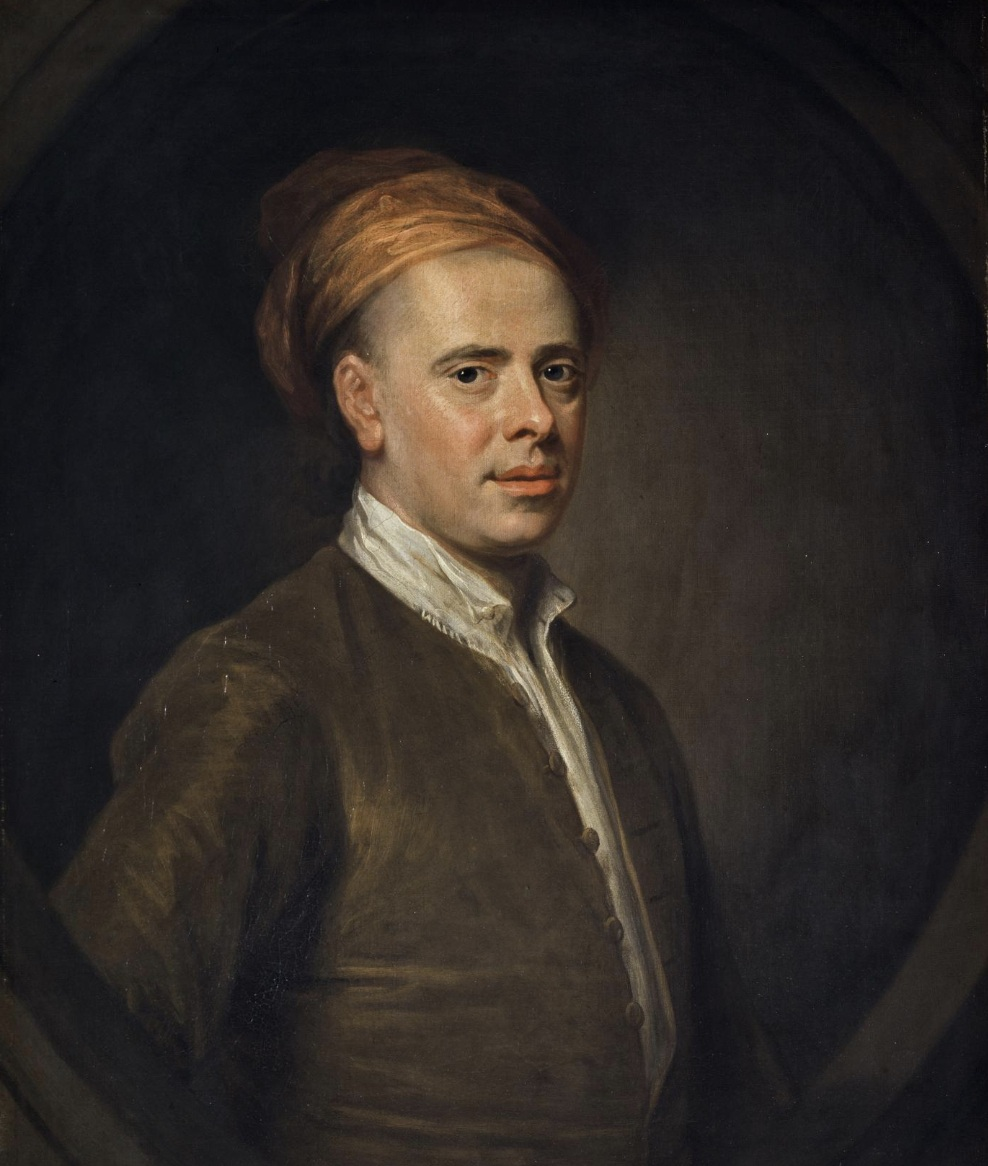
Alan Ramsay, the most influential literary figure in early eighteenth-century Scotland

The early eighteenth century was also a period of innovation in Gaelic vernacular poetry. Major figures included Rob Donn Mackay (1714–78) and Donnchadh Bàn Mac an t-Saoir (Duncan Ban MacIntyre) (1724–1812). The most significant figure in the tradition was Alasdair mac Mhaighstir Alasdair (Alasdair MacDonald) (c. 1698–1770). His interest in traditional forms can be seen in his most significant poem Clanranald's Gallery. He also mixed these traditions with influences from the Lowlands, including Thompson's Seasons, which helped inspire a new form of nature poetry in Gaelic, which was not focused on their relations to human concerns.

=== Drama ===
Drama was pursued by Scottish playwrights in London such as Catherine Trotter (1679–1749), born in London to Scottish parents and later moving to Aberdeen. Her plays and included the verse-tragedy Fatal Friendship (1698), the comedy Love at a Loss (1700) and the history The Revolution in Sweden (1706). David Crawford's (1665–1726) plays included the Restoration comedies Courtship A-la-Mode (1700) and Love at First Sight (1704). These developed the character of the stage Scot, often a clown, but cunning and loyal. Newburgh Hamilton (1691–1761), born in Ireland of Scottish descent, produced the comedies The Petticoat-Ploter (1712) and The Doating Lovers or The Libertine (1715). He later wrote the libretto for Handel's Samson (1743), closely based on John Milton's Samson Agonistes. James Thomson's plays often dealt with the contest between public duty and private feelings, included Sophonisba (1730), Agamemnon (1738) and Tancrid and Sigismuda (1745), the last of which was an international success. David Mallet's (c. 1705–65) Eurydice (1731) was accused of being a coded Jacobite play and his later work indicates opposition to the Walpole administration. The opera Masque of Alfred (1740) was a collaboration between Thompson, Mallet and composer Thomas Arne, with Thompson supplying the lyrics for his most famous work, the patriotic song Rule, Britannia!

In Scotland a troop of English players came to Edinburgh in 1715 where they performed Macbeth and a series of Restoration comedies, but they soon left, perhaps because of objections from local kirk presbyteries. By 1725 English actor Anthony Aston, a friend of Ramsay, was performing in Edinburgh, but seems to have fallen foul of the Scottish Master of the Revels, who licensed plays, companies and playhouses, and soon left. In 1727 the Kirk attacked theatres as immoral in the Admonition and Exhortation. The Edinburgh Company of Players were able to perform in Dundee, Montrose, Aberdeen and regular performances at the Taylor's Hall in Edinburgh under the protection of a Royal Patent. Ramsay was instrumental in establishing them in a small theatre in Carruber's Close in Edinburgh, but the passing of the 1737 Licensing Act made their activities illegal and the theatre soon closed. A new theatre was opened at Cannongate in 1747 and operated without a licence into the 1760s.
