= William John Blew =

Translator and hymnist

William John Blew (13 April 1808 – 27 December 1894) was a translator and hymnist.

== Life ==
He was the only son of William Blew. He was born in St. James's, Westminster on 13 April 1808. He was educated with John Henry Newman at Great Ealing School. He graduated from Wadham College, Oxford, B.A. in 1830, and M.A. 1832.

On taking Holy Orders, Blew was curate of Nuthurst and Cocking, and St Annes, Westminster, and for a time incumbent of St John's next Gravesend.

He had married after his father's death in 1845, and resided at his father's house, 6 Warwick Street, Pall Mall East, where he died, aged 86, on 28 December 1894.

== Works ==
Besides translation from Homer (Iliad, books i, ii, etc.) and Aeschylus (Agamemnon the King), and works in the Book of Common Prayer, including a paraphrase on a translation of the same in Latin, he edited the Breviarium Aberdonense 1854; and published a pamphlet on Hymns and Hymn Books, 1858; and (with Dr. H.J. Gauntlett) the Church Hymn and Tune Book, 1852, 2nd. ed. 1855. The hymns in the last work are chiefly translations by Blew of Latin hymns. They were written from 1845 to 1852, and printed on fly-sheets for the use of his congregation. Many of these translations have come into common use. Particularly well-known is "A Shameful Death He Dies" to the tune "Troyte's Chant".

Blew also translated the Altar Service of the Church of England of 1548 into English.

== Sources ==
- Julian, John (June 1907). A Dictionary of Hymnology. London: John Murray. pp. 149–150.
