= Great Ealing School =

Phrontistery

Coordinates: 51.5064°N 0.3072°W

Schoolboys with hoops painted by W. J. Franklin in 1809

Great Ealing School was situated on St Mary's Road, Ealing W5 London and was founded in 1698. In its heyday of the 19th century, it was as famous as Eton or Harrow, being considered "the best private school in England".

== History ==
The school first took up residence in Ealing's Old Rectory. This was a moated house with a magnificent garden which stood next to the church of St Mary where Ranelagh Road now runs and all the way northward, along St Mary's Road to Warwick Road. The school had a swimming pool, cricket greens, tennis courts and the once famous Fives courts. A row of five cottages were used as studies. Opposite the school was the parish workhouse, where the poor and infirm slept three or more to a bed.

The future King of France, Louis-Philippe, taught mathematics and geography at the school. He did this to support himself whilst living in exile in Twickenham between 1800 and 1815. Eventually, the Rectory succumbed to dry rot and had to relocate in 1847.

It moved from the north side of St. Mary's Church in Ealing on the eastern side of St Mary's Road to the western side of the same road and was renamed The Owls, which then formed part of its crest. In 1874, it became a day school teaching vocational subjects such as bookkeeping. In 1879, it changed again, becoming a school for Jewish boys.

It closed in 1908 and the roads Cairn Avenue and Nicholas Gardens now stand upon the grounds. The latter is named after the famous headmastering family of its greatest period.

== Notable students ==
- William John Blew, hymn composer and translator
- W. S. Gilbert of Gilbert and Sullivan
- Thomas Huxley, scientist
- Charles Knight, publisher
- Frederick Marryat, author
- John Henry Newman, cardinal and author
- Hicks Pasha, soldier
- Henry Rawlinson, soldier and adventurer
- Zachary Pearce, bishop of Rochester
- George Augustus Selwyn, first Anglican bishop of New Zealand
- Edwin Roper Loftus Stocqueler, artist
