= Aberdeen Breviary =

Printed book published in Edinburgh in 1510

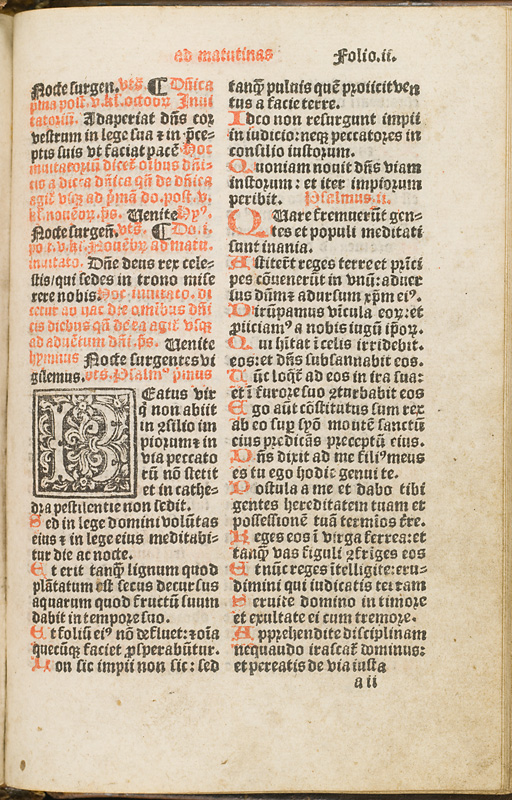
A page from the psalter of the Aberdeen breviary of 1509

The Aberdeen Breviary (Latin: Breviarium Aberdonense) is a 16th-century Scottish Catholic breviary. It was the first full-length book to be printed in Edinburgh, and in Scotland.

== Origin ==
The creation of the Aberdeen Breviary can be seen as one of the features of the growing Scottish nationalism and identity of the early sixteenth century. In 1507, King James IV, realizing that the existing Sarum Breviary, or Rite, was English in origin, desired the printing of a Scottish version. Since Scotland had no printing press at that time, booksellers Walter Chepman and Androw Myllar of Edinburgh were commissioned to “bring home a printing press” primarily for that purpose.

To create the breviary itself, James sought out William Elphinstone, Bishop of Aberdeen, who had received the king's permission to establish the University of Aberdeen twelve years before. To help him with the undertaking, Elphinstone, in turn, tapped the man who had helped him found the university, Scottish philosopher and historian Hector Boece. The two began their work in 1509, and the first copy, produced as a small octavo, came off the press in 1510.

== Contents ==
Like the Sarum Rite, which had been in use since the twelfth century, the Aberdeen Breviary contained brief lives, or biographies, of the saints as well as the liturgy and canonical hours which were to conform to Roman practice and serve as the standard of Christian worship throughout the country. The saints’ lives, or biographies, in the breviary were all written by either Elphinstone or Boece.

Boece once noted that Elphinstone collected legends of saints from every diocese in Scotland, including both national heroes and local saints. He also noted that Elphinstone devoted time to the study of ancient Scottish histories, especially in the Western Isles, where “tombs of the ancient kings” lie. In addition, some material, such as Lessons for St Cuthbert, came from the writings of Bede. Some of the collected materials were included verbatim in the breviary, and some were re-written.

However, unlike the Sarum Rite, the Aberdeen work also contained lives of the nation's saints—Scottish saints such as Kentigern, Machar, and Margaret of Scotland. Indeed, historian Jane Geddes has gone so far as to call the Aberdeen Breviary a work of “religious patriotism,” pointing out Scotland's sixteenth-century efforts to establish its own identity. She writes that both Elphinstone and the king “were attempting to direct the apparently growing interest in local cults ... toward a range of saints that they identified as Scottish.”

Along with focusing on Scottish saints, Elphinstone sometimes “Scotticized” Irish and continental saints, one of the most interesting being the office of an Irish missionary in France named Fiacre. Historian Steve Boardman speculates Fiacre appealed to the Scots because of their traditional military alliance with France and long history of wars against the English Crown. Furthermore, the Irish-born French saint is associated with the death of England's invading King Henry V. After the Battle of Agincourt, Henry had allowed his army to pillage Fiacre's monastery and Christian pilgrimage shrine in the town bearing his name, but Fiacre supernaturally prevented the English soldiers from carrying their loot beyond the boundaries of his monastery. Henry V died of haemorrhoids on 30 August, St Fiacre's feast day.

Boardman points out, however, that there are a few cases in which Elphinstone and Boece included saints associated with Scotland, but introduced as otherwise. One example is St Constantine the Great, for whom there were dedicated places of worship in Scotland—at Kilchousland in Kintyre and at Govan—and whom Glasgow even claimed as a native son.

The breviary, which was composed in Latin, includes at the back a small, 16-page book entitled Compassio Beate Marie, which has readings about the relics of St Andrew, Scotland's patron saint. In addition, at the end of each volume were the Propria Sanctorum, containing prayers and readings to be used only on the feast day of the particular saint. Hymns, responsories, and antiphons were composed for most of the saints in various metres and styles. There are poems as well, although, except for the poem for the office of St Fiacre, they are not high in quality. All these were to be used as acts of worship.

== Extant copies ==
Only four copies of the Aberdeen Breviary are extant: one in the University of Edinburgh; one in the Library of the Faculty of Advocates, Edinburgh; one in the library of King's College, Aberdeen; and one recently purchased by the National Library of Scotland from the private collection of the Earl of Strathmore in Glamis, Angus.

A facsimile of one copy was published in two parts (Pars estiva and Pars hyemalis) in 1854 & 1855, edited by William Blew; this facsimile was issued to members of the Bannatyne, Maitland and Spalding Clubs. The copy held by the University of Edinburgh has been entirely digitised, and is available for viewing online.

== See also ==
- Chepman and Myllar Press
