= Joachim Hayward Stocqueler =

British writer

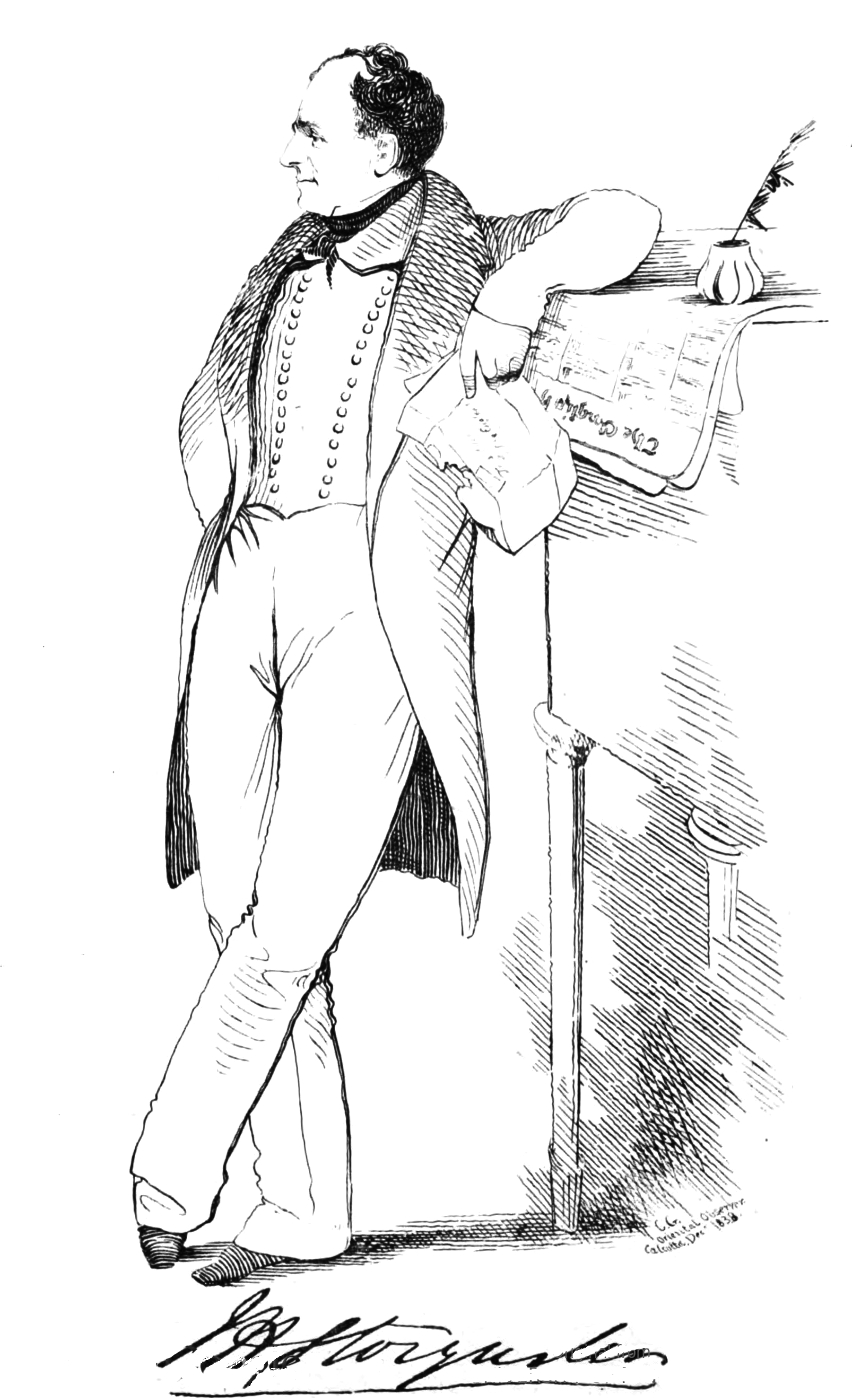
- Portrait by Colesworthey Grant
- Born: 21 July 1801; Abchurch Lane, London, England
- Died: 14 March 1886 (aged 84); Washington, D.C.
- Education: Brochard's academy, Camden, London, England
- Occupations: Journalist, writer
- Spouses: Jane Spencer (m. 1828; died 1870) Eliza Wilson Pepper (m. 1844) Mary Cameron (m. 1870)
- Children: 9
- Parents: Joachim Christian Stocqueler (father); Elizabeth Hayward (mother)
- Relatives: Edwin Roper Loftus Stocqueler (son)

J. H. Stocqueler (21 July 1801 – 14 March 1886) was a journalist, writer and lecturer with interests in the theatre and in Indian and military affairs; he lived in England, India, and the United States of America.

== Biography ==
Joachim Hayward Stocqueler was born 21 July 1801 in Abchurch Lane, City of London and baptized 25 August 1801 at the Portuguese Embassy Chapel in London. His father was Joachim Christian Stocqueler, son of the Italian opera singer Giovanna Sestini and her Portuguese husband José Christiano Stocqueler. His mother was Elizabeth Hayward, a daughter of Francis Hayward, physician of Hackney.

He was educated at Brochard's academy in Camden. After occasional jobs in a bank and with a traveling theatre company, he trained at Chatham as a non-commissioned officer in the East India Company Army, and then sailed for Bombay in 1819 on the East Indiaman Hythe, in charge of 100 men.

Stocqueler purchased his discharge from the army in 1824; he had obtained a clerical job with the Chief Secretary to the Bombay Government but his increasingly radical views and interest in the press made him unpopular. He made a visit to England returning to Bombay in 1827 with printing materials. He edited the Bombay Courier, started the Bombay Sporting Magazine and Racing Calendar, helped with the foundation of the Bombay Public Library, but found himself seriously in debt.

Leaving Bombay hurriedly in a small Arab boat bound for the Persian Gulf, Stocqueler embarked on a perilous journey during 1831 and 1832. Plans to investigate an overland route from the river Euphrates to Europe via Baghdad were foiled by war and plague and he was obliged to travel via the hazardous Buctarian mountains in Persia, apparently never before crossed by a white man. He survived sickness and attack and eventually reached the Black Sea and a ship to Odessa, where he was quarantined. He then journeyed across Europe encountering the exiled Polish general Jan Zygmunt Skrzynecki in Linz and Prince Adolphus, Duke of Cambridge, Viceroy in Hanover. He gave thanks for his survival when he reached London in May 1832 and published the account of his journeys in two volumes entitled Fifteen Months Pilgrimage through Untrodden Tracts in Khuzistan and Persia .

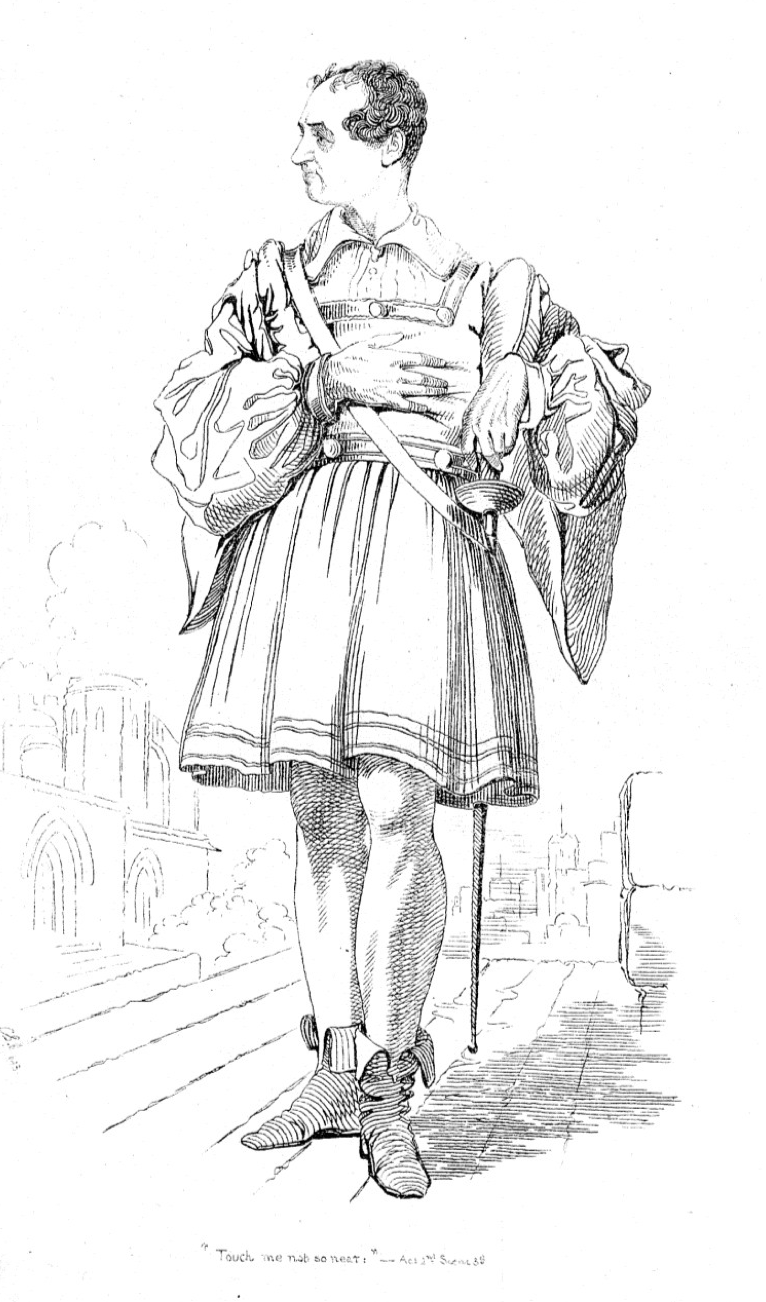
Stocqueler as Iago in an amateur production of Othello, Calcutta, 1838

Early in 1833 Stocqueler was back in India, but now in Calcutta where, with the help of the Bengali entrepreneur Dwarkanath Tagore, he purchased the newspaper John Bull. He changed its name to The Englishman and, as its editor, gave it a liberal focus but at times annoyed local residents. Stocqueler also published the Bengal Sporting Magazine (1833–1845) and East India United Services Journal. In 1836, the Calcutta Public Library was established at his suggestion. He was involved with theatrical performances in fashionable Chowringhee and with the new Sans Souci theatre there.

As a journalist Stocqueler observed the First Anglo-Afghan War, but on his return to Calcutta financial problems landed him in the Debtors’ Prison there from October 1840 until February 1841. He sold The Englishman (which continued successfully) and left India on the new P&O paddle steamer Hindostan in 1843, bound for Suez. He travelled via Egypt and Italy to London, which he made his home for the next 16 years.

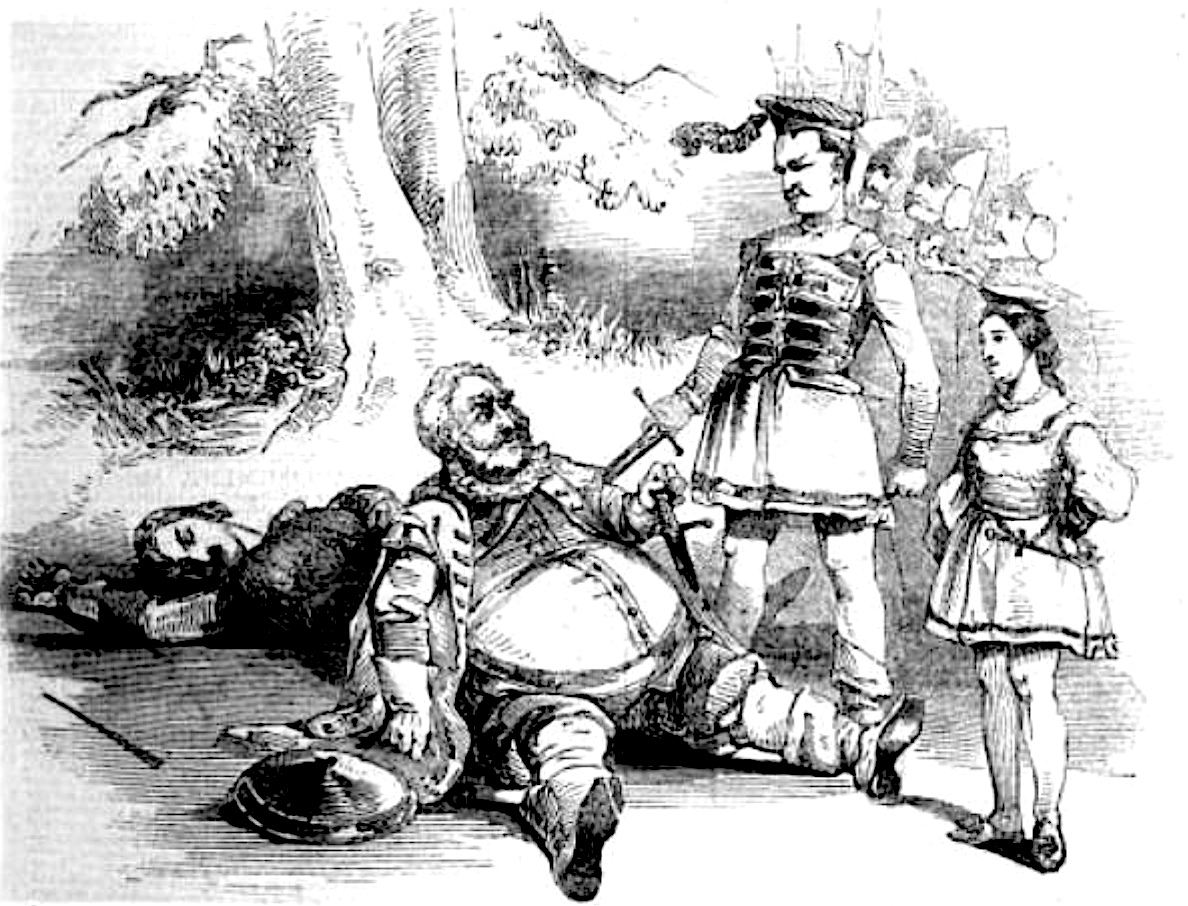
Stoqueler (standing, with sword) as Prince Hal in Henry IV, Part 1 at the Lyceum Theatre, London, 1844. He had played the role in Calcutta.

Stocqueler was a prolific writer, making use of his experiences of India, the military and his travels. He wrote for the theatre, including the text for successful spectacles such as The Battle of The Alma and The Fall of Sebastopol, both elaborately staged at Astley's Amphitheatre in south London. He was a charismatic lecturer and provided the commentary for dioramas at the Gallery of Illustration in Regent Street: subjects included the Overland Route to Australia, the continuing story of the Crimean War, and the exploits of the Duke of Wellington, whose biography Stocqueler also wrote. He was less successful as a newspaperman in London, but was army editor of the United Service Gazette for several years. He tutored candidates for military colleges and was involved with the short-lived Cavalry College in Richmond. His reputation was not helped by suggestions of involvement in the illegal sale of army commissions.

Despite his varied occupations, during his years in London Stocqueler was frequently in financial difficulties. He used family money (including all the assets of a wealthy maiden aunt) and faced bankruptcy on several occasions, even once using sequestration under Scottish law to evade further imprisonment in London. Then sensationally, in 1859 he ran away during a court hearing in Maidstone, Kent and escaped, under the pseudonym of Siddons, to New York.

In North America he continued to write and lecture; a post at Columbia College in New York was interrupted by the onset of the Civil War but Siddons (as he was now known) offered some military instruction to Unionist recruits. He then lectured in Canada and New England, before going back to England to recruit artisans who would emigrate and take up manufacturing work in the States.

Life was not easy in London, or briefly in Ireland, and in 1875 Stocqueler returned again to the United States, settling in Washington DC where found clerical work as a civil servant and gained some reputation as a Shakespearean scholar. Stocqueler, known at the time as Professor J H Siddons, died at home at 2006 13th Street NW, Washington, DC on 14 March 1886, not 1885 in Bath, England, as is sometimes stated.

At intervals from 1860 to his death, Stocqueler used the surname Siddons, mainly in the United States of America and, at times in Britain, claiming that he was the illegitimate son of George Siddons, son of Sarah Siddons the actress. Although apparently believed by some of his family, this claim was vehemently disputed by Sarah Siddons’s true great-grand-daughter, the actress Mary Frances Scott-Siddons.

=== Family life ===
Stocqueler married Jane Spencer in Bombay in 1828; their son Edwin Roper Loftus Stocqueler was born in the following year. A second son born in Calcutta died in infancy. Following a long separation from her husband, and time in England, Jane Stocqueler and Edwin departed for the Victorian gold fields in Australia. Edwin, an artist, was present on the Bendigo gold fields during the mid-1850s, where he painted several scenes of the diggings. Jane Stocqueler died in Bombay in 1870, and Edwin in London in 1895.

In 1844 Joachim Hayward Stocqueler was married by the Rev. Charles Wesley at St Paul's, Covent Garden, to Eliza Wilson Pepper of Deal, Kent. This was a bigamous marriage as he was already married to Jane. Eliza bore him four children, two of whom (Fanny and Edgar) survived. The family joined Stocqueler in New York in 1860. Fanny Stocqueler became a musical theatre artiste in America. Edgar Stocqueler became a master mariner who married in England and whose large family all emigrated to New South Wales. Eliza Stocqueler was married secondly, in New Jersey in 1868, to the disgraced British lawyer Edwin John James, and then returned to England.

Stocqueler also fathered three children, between 1852 and 1857, in an adulterous affair with Mrs Louisa Wardroper. Two children, Arthur and Marion Stocqueler Wardroper, survived. Arthur became a clergyman and Marion was the mother of the songwriter and film actor Arthur Charles Margetson.

When in the United States Stocqueler met aspiring actress Mary Agnes Cameron, nearly forty years his junior. They performed together, giving readings in Canada and New England, where he pretended she was his niece. They sailed together to England in 1864 and their son was born later that year. Two daughters followed and then in London, when he was almost 69 and Jane Stocqueler had died in Bombay, Stocqueler married Mary Cameron at Holy Trinity, Haverstock Hill on 19 July 1870. In 1875, the family settled in the United States. The most famous of the three children was Frederick Lincoln Siddons, who later became a United States federal judge, and is remembered inter alia for his part in the Teapot Dome scandal and as the grandfather-in-law of the writer Anne Rivers Siddons.

== Writings ==
=== Authored ===
- Fifteen Months Pilgrimage through Untrodden Tracts in Khuzistan and Persia... in the Years 1831 and 1832. 2 vols London: Saunders & Otley, 1832.
- The Wellington Manual, being a compilation from the dispatches of ... the Duke of Wellington, embracing his sentiments on various points relating to military discipline and administration, &c. Calcutta: W. Rushton & Co., 1840.
- Memorials of Affghanistan... between the Years 1838 and 1842. Calcutta: 1843.
- Lucretia Borgia, a romance of history. London: William Barth, 1844
- The Handbook of India, A guide to the Stranger and the Traveller, and a Companion to the Resident. London: W.H. Allen, 1844.
- The Oriental Interpreter and Treasury of East India Knowledge : companion to The Handbook of British India. London: C. Cox, 1848.
- Maid Marian: the Forest Queen. London: George Peirce, 1849. Originally serialized in 31 parts.
- A Catechism of Field Fortifications. London: United Service Gazette Press, 1850
- The Overland Companion: being a guide for the traveller to India via Egypt. London: Wm. H. Allen & Co., 1850.
- The British Officer, His Position, Duties and Emoluments and Privileges. London: Smith, Elder & Co., 1851.
- The Victory must be won. Song: Words by J H Stocqueler. Music composed by Miss Harriet Georgina Willoughby. London: T. E. Purday, 1852
- The Old Field Officer; or, the military and sporting adventures of Major Worthington. Edinburgh: A. & C. Black, 1853
- The Military Encyclopædia; A Technical, Biographical, and Historical Dictionary, referring exclusively to the Military Sciences, the Memoirs of Distinguished Soldiers, and the Narratives of Remarkable Battles. London: Wm. H. Allen & Co., 1853.
- India: its history, climate, productions, and field sports; with notices of European life and manners, and of the various travelling routes. London: G. Routledge and Co., 1853.
- The Life of Field-Marshal the Duke of Wellington. Two volumes. London: Ingram, Cooke, and Company, 1853; Philadelphia: 1855.
- Memoirs and Correspondence of Major-General Sir William Nott. 2 vols. London: Hurst & Blackett, 1854.
- Military Catechism and Handbook of Regimental Standing Orders by Anthony Walshe, revised and enlarged by J H Stocqueler. London: W. Thacker & Co., 1855.
- The British Soldier: an anecdotal history of the British Army from its earliest formation to the present time. London: Orr & Co., 1857.
- The True Causes of the Revolt of the Bengal army. London: Charles Evans, 1858.
- A Familiar History of British India, from the earliest period to the transfer of the government of India to the British crown in 1858. London: Darton, 1859.
- The War in Italy, and all about it. London: Henry Lea, 1859.
- Norton’s Hand-book to Europe: or, How to Travel in the Old World. By J H Siddons (J H Stocqueler). New York: Charles B Norton, 1860
- The Canadian Volunteers' hand-book : a compendium of military facts and suggestions adapted to field service. By J H Siddons (J H Stocqueler). Toronto: Rollo & Adam, 1863.
- The Emigrant's Friend; a true guide to the emigrant proceeding to New York, Boston, Philadelphia or the Canadas. Liverpool: W. Gilling, 1864.
- Yankeeland in her Trouble: An Englishman's Correspondence during the War. By J H Siddons (J H Stocqueler). Pamphlet (no publisher), 1864.
- A Familiar History of the United States of America from the date of the earliest settlements down to the present time. London: Darton & Hodge, 1865.
- A Familiar History of the British army, from the Restoration in 1660 to the Present Time. London: Stanford, 1871.
- A Personal History of The Horse-Guards from 1750 to 1872. London: Hurst & Blackett, 1873.
- The Memoirs of a Journalist. London: Hurst and Blackett, 1873.
- A Review of the Life and Labours of Dr. G.W. Leitner, (reprinted from The Oriental). Brighton: Tower Press, 1875
- The Rajahate of Saràwak, (reprinted from The Oriental). Brighton: Tower Press, 1875
- Utterance and Expression: a few words on the importance of high art reading and effective speaking. By J H Siddons (J H Stocqueler). New York: Sheldon & Co., 1876.
- The Language and Literature of Shakespeare. By J H Siddons (J H Stocqueler). Washington: Gibson brothers, printers, 1884.
- The Shakespearian Referee. By J H Siddons (J H Stocqueler). Washington: W.H. Lowdermilk & Co., 1886

==== Minor Plays ====
- Polkamania: an apropos bagatelle in one act. 1844
- The Three Fra Diavolos. 1844
- A Good Name. 1845
- An Object of Interest. 1845
- The Seven Champions of Christendom. 1845
- Robin Hood and Richard Coeur de Lion. 1846
- The Marble Maiden. 1846
- Crusoe the Second. 1847
- Emigration, the Remedy. 1848
- The Fortress. 1848
- The Provisional Government. 1848
- Any Port in a Storm. 1853
- The Butterfly’s Ball. 1855
- Dead Heart. (as J.H. Siddons). 1860

==== Productions at Astley’s Amphitheatre and Elsewhere ====
- The Sikh Invasion. 1846
- The Camp of Silesia; or the Gypsy Queen. 1847
- The Revolt of the Harem. 1848
- The Battle of the Alma. 1854
- The Fall of Sebastopol. 1855
- England and France in the Days of Chivalry. 1855
- The Bombardment and Capture of Canton. 1858
- La Belle France and the Maid of Orleans. 1868

==== Newspapers edited ====
Bombay (1822–1830)
* Iris
* Bombay Chronicle (formerly The Argus)
* Bombay Sporting Magazine
* Bombay Racing Calendar
Calcutta (1833–1842)
* The Englishman
* The Oriental Observer
* The Bengal Sporting Magazine
* The Indian Racing Calendar for 1836-37
*The East Indian United Service Journal and Military Magazine
London (1843–1859; 1865–1875)
* The English Gentleman
* Pictorial Times
* The Court Journal
* United Service Gazette (military section)
* The Oriental
