= Giovanna Sestini =

Italian opera singer

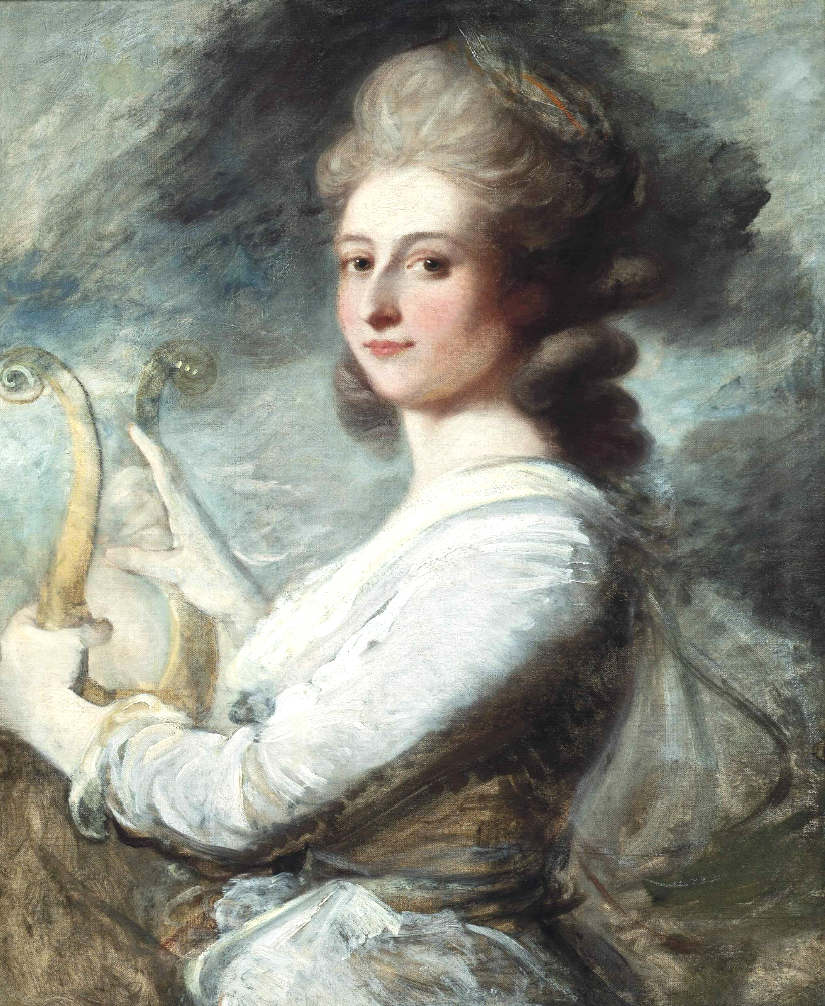
Portrait of Giovanna Sestini by Ozias Humphry, portrayed as Terpsichore, muse of dance and the dramatic chorus

Giovanna Sestini (6 April 1749 – 14 July 1814) was a soprano opera singer who performed in her native Italy, in Portugal, and from 1774 in London, where she lived for the rest of her life. For many years she was the popular prima buffa (or first woman) in comic opera at the King's Theatre in the Haymarket. In her later years, she was known by her married name, Joanna Stocqueler.

== Biography ==
=== Youth ===
Giovanna Sestini was baptised 7 April 1749 in the Pieve di San Martino a Gangalandi in the small town of Lastra a Signa, near Florence. She was the daughter of Pietro (son of Silvestro Sestini) and Maria Altomira, daughter of Dottore Eustachio Speramundi Fabbrini. She had a sister Anna (born 1745), also a singer, and a brother Vincenzo (born 1743) who became a renowned theatrical wardrobe master in London. Giovanna and Anna sang in opera buffa in various Italian cities between 1763 and about 1767.

=== Move to Lisbon ===
When recovering from the devastating 1755 Lisbon earthquake, Portuguese theatres actively recruited performers from Italy. These included Giovanna and Anna Sestini who sang in Italian opera at the new Teatro da Rua dos Condes in Lisbon from 1768 until 1774. Giovanna was better paid as she took more demanding roles than her sister of whom nothing more is then known.

=== Marriage ===
José Christiano Stocqueler (1749–1812) was descended from a merchant and consul originally from Hamburg, Christian Stockler (ca 1688–1772), who had married well in Portugal. The family moved in Court circles and José Christiano had been made a Knight of the Order of Christ at the age of nineteen. His family disapproved when he formed a liaison with a beautiful Italian opera singer, but he and Giovanna Sestini married and two sons were born before they moved to London.

=== Move to London ===
In 1774 there were difficulties in the Lisbon theatres and Giovanna Sestini entered a contract to be prima buffa at the King's Theatre in London for the coming season. With her husband and sons she took lodgings in Oxendon Street close to the Haymarket. Her London debut was as La Cecchina in Niccolò Piccinni's La buona figliuola and she was immediately acclaimed even though in an advanced state of pregnancy. Her third son was born on New Year's Day 1775 and baptised Joseph Christian Stocqueler in a Roman Catholic ceremony at the Portuguese Embassy Chapel in Mayfair.

=== Further career ===
Sestini sang comic roles in Italian at the King's Theatre during many seasons until the theatre was destroyed by fire in 1789. She was at the Smock Alley Theatre in Dublin, in Italian opera in 1777–78, and singing in English in 1784–85. When she first sang on the English stage at Covent Garden in 1782 the part of Lorenza in John O'Keeffe's The Castle of Andalusia was especially adapted to suit her broken English. As usual she received glowing reviews in the press, but again had to withdraw after five performances for the birth of her eighth and last child. Sestini had further engagements at Covent Garden and also sang in the summer programmes at the Little Theatre or with Elizabeth Bannister at the Theatre Royal Haymarket.

In all she sang over sixty operatic roles: her most frequent performance was as Violante in Giovanni Paisiello's La frascatana. Sestini augmented her income by singing at private concerts – including in 1775 for the royal family. She also performed at the Oxford Music Rooms, the Freemasons' Hall and the Pantheon in London, and in 1792 at St Cecilia's Hall in Edinburgh. This was her last professional engagement.

=== Family ===
Sestini's husband José Christiano Stocqueler became the London agent of the Royal Wine Company of Oporto. One of their sons, known as Master Sestini, performed at the Royal Circus and Equestrian Philharmonic Academy in Blackfriars Road and also Young Sestini sang in support of the Theatre Royal, Haymarket in 1787. The line "I am a Merry Andrew, Andrew is my name" has led to the erroneous suggestion that the Stocquelers had a son called Andrew. None of the Stocqueler children had a stage career as an adult. A grandson Joachim Hayward Stocqueler was a journalist, writer, lecturer and rogue who also used the name Siddons.

=== Death ===
Joanna Stocqueler died on 14 July 1814, two years after her husband, at their last home in Broad Street Buildings, Bishopsgate, in the City of London. They were both buried in the graveyard of St Pancras Old Church. Neither newspaper reports of her death nor her epitaph made any mention of Giovanna Sestini's distinguished career as a singer.
