= Androw Myllar =

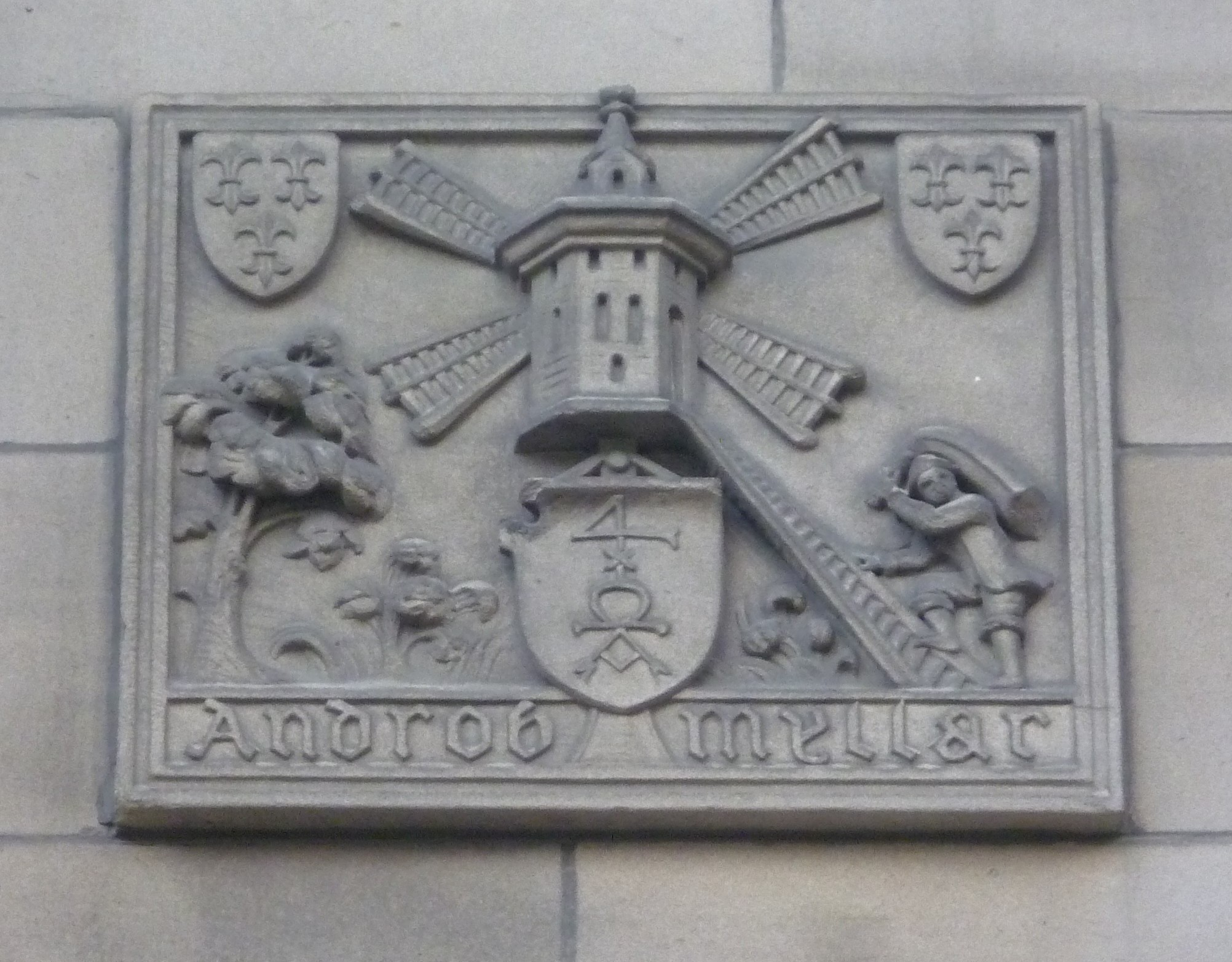
A sculpted tablet on the facade of Edinburgh's Central Library commemorates Myllar

Androw Myllar (fl. 1503–1508) was the first Scottish printer. Little is known about his life. He is known to have been a bookseller from at least 1503 and to have solicited the printing of at least two books in 1505 and 1506, most likely in Rouen. On 15 September 1507, Myllar, together with Walter Chepman, was granted a patent by James IV for establishing a printing press in Scotland. They established their print shop in Edinburgh and on 4 April 1508 they issued the first book known to have been printed in Scotland, The Complaint of the Black Knight. Nothing of his life after 1508 is known and there is no evidence that he was involved with the printing of the Aberdeen Breviary in 1510 which was financed by Chepman and was the main reason for the introduction of the printing press to Scotland.

== Background ==
Myllar was a burgess of Edinburgh and a bookseller, but perhaps combined the sale of books with some other occupation. On 29 March 1503 the sum of 10 Scots pounds was paid by the Lord High Treasurer of Scotland "to Andro Millar for thir bukis undirwritten, viz., Decretum Magnum, Decretales Sextus cum Clementinis, Scotus super quatuor libris Sententiarum, Quartum Scoti, Opera Gersonis in tribus voluminibus." Another payment of fifty shillings was made on 22 December 1507 "for 3 prentit bukis to the King, tane fra Andro Millaris wyff."

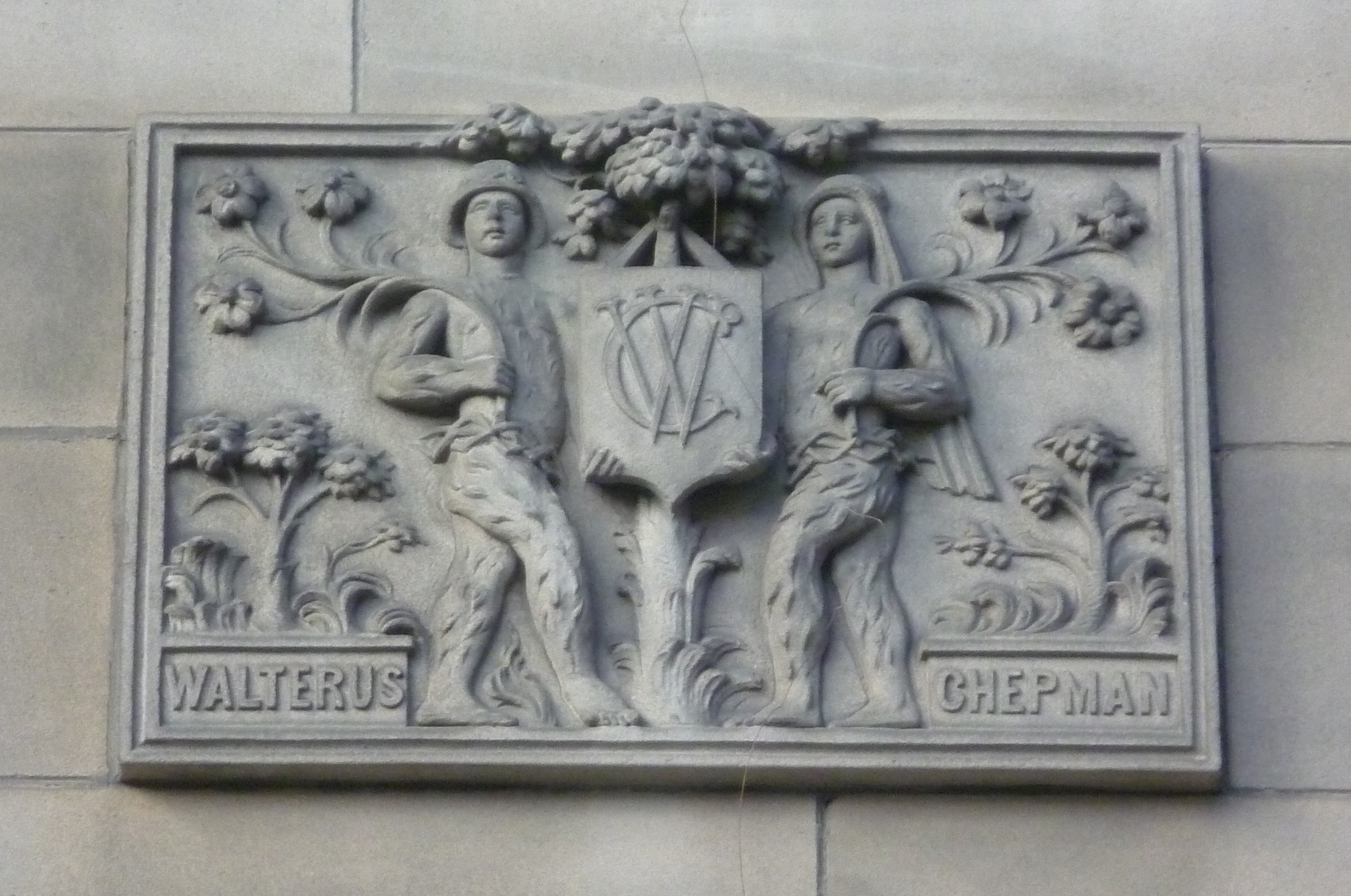
An adjacent tablet commemorates Chepman

The first book on which Myllar's name appears is an edition, printed in 1505, of Joannes de Garlandia's Multorum vocabulorum equiuocorum interpretation, of which the only copy known is in the Bibliothèque Nationale at Paris. It has a colophon which states that Androw Myllar, a Scotsman, had been solicitous that the work should be printed with admirable art and corrected with diligent care. The second book is the Expositio Sequentiarum, according to the use of Sarum, printed in 1506, the copy of which in the British Museum is believed to be unique. The last page contains Myllar's punning device, representing a windmill with the miller ascending the outside ladder and carrying a sack of grain upon his back. Beneath is the printer's monogram and name. These two books were undoubtedly printed abroad. M. Claudin, who discovered them, and Dr. Dickson have ascribed them to the press of Laurence Hostingue of Rouen; but Gordon Duff has produced evidence to show that they should rather be assigned to that of Pierre Violette, another printer at Rouen.

It was probably due to the influence of William Elphinstone the Bishop of Aberdeen, who was engaged in preparing an adaptation of the Sarum breviary for the use of his diocese, that James IV on 15 September 1507 granted a patent to Walter Chepman and Androw Myllar "to furnis and bring hame ane prent, with all stuff belangand tharto, and expert men to use the samyne, for imprenting within our Realme of the bukis of our Lawis, actis of parliament, croniclis, mess bukis, and portuus efter the use of our Realme, with addicions and legendis of Scottis sanctis, now gaderit to be ekit tharto, and al utheris bukis that salbe sene necessar, and to sel the sammyn for competent pricis."

== Printing ==
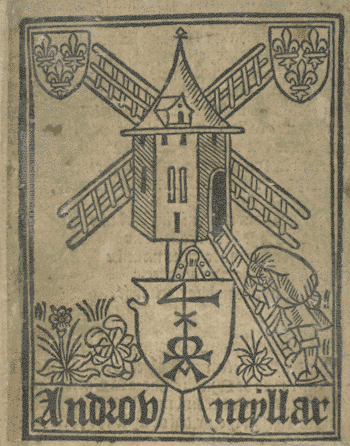
The Porteous of Nobleness

Chepman having found the necessary capital, and Myllar having obtained the type from France, probably from Rouen, they set up their press in a house at the foot of Blackfriars Wynd, in the Southgait, now the Cowgate, of Edinburgh, and on 4 April 1508 issued the first book known to have been printed in Scotland, The Maying or Disport of Chaucer, better known as The Complaint of the Black Knight, and written not by Chaucer but by Lydgate. This tract consists of fourteen leaves, and has Chepman's device on the title-page, and Myllar's device at the end. The only copy known has been held in the Library of the Faculty of Advocates at Edinburgh since 1788.

Bound with this work are ten other unique pieces, eight of which are also from the Southgait press, but two only of all are perfect, The Maying or Disport of Chaucer and The Goldyn Targe of William Dunbar. Four of the tracts bear the devices both of Chepman and of Myllar, and three others that of Myllar alone.

The titles of the other pieces, two only of which are dated, are as follows:

1. The Knightly Tale of Golagros and Gawane, 8 April 1508
2. The Porteous of Nobleness, a translation of "Le Bréviaire des nobles" by Alain Chartier, 20 April 1508
3. Syr Eglamoure of Artoys
4. The Goldyn Targe, by William Dunbar
5. Ane Buke of Gude Counsale to the King
6. The Flyting of Dunbar and Kennedy
7. The Tale of Orpheus and Erudices his Quene, by Robert Henryson
8. The Ballade of Lord Barnard Stewart, by William Dunbar

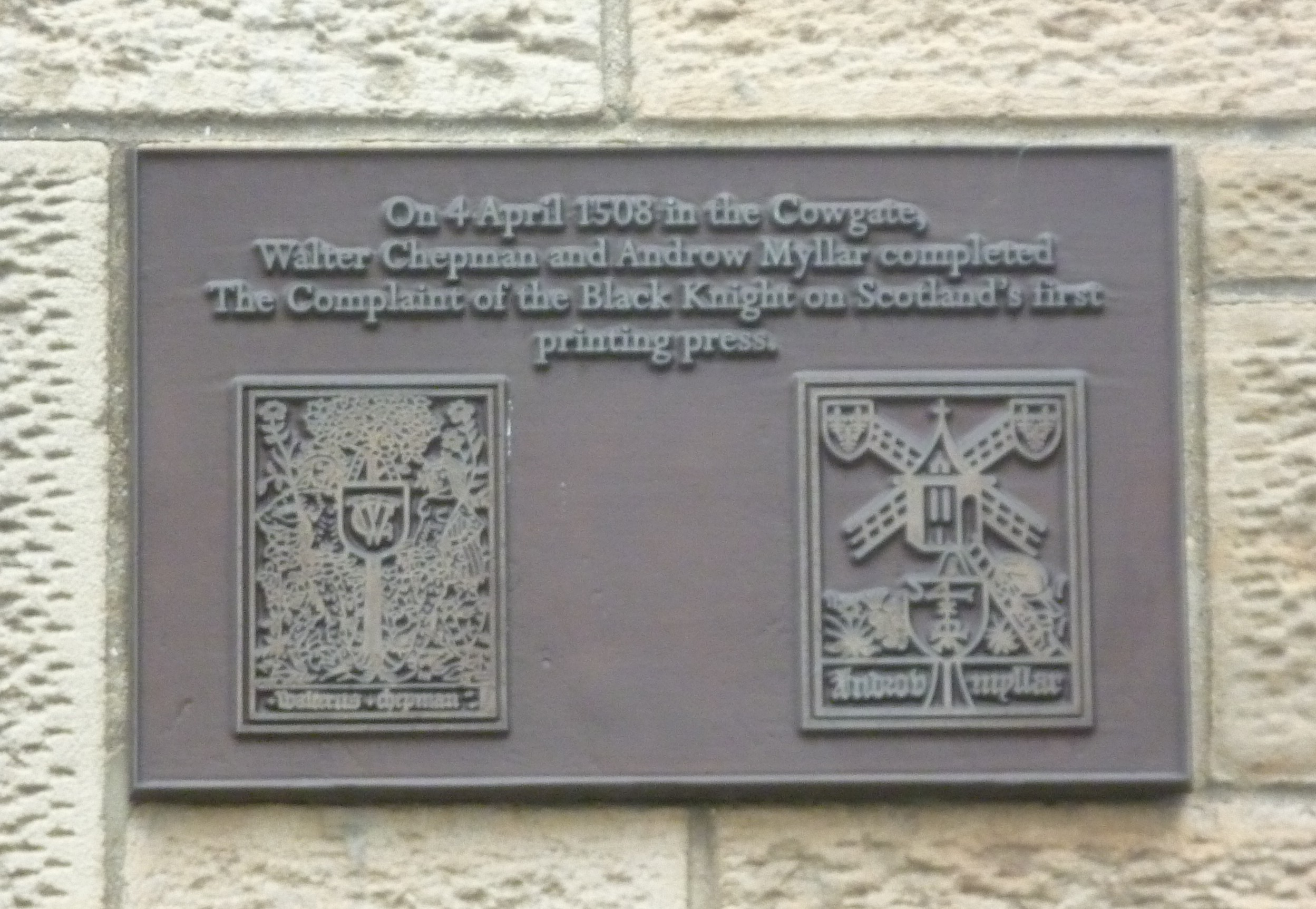
Chepman & Myllar plaque in the Old Town of Edinburgh

Two other pieces, The Tretis of the Twa Mariit Wemen and the Wedo, also by Dunbar, and A Gest of Robyn Hode, are contained in the same volume, but they are printed with different types, and there is no evidence to prove that they emanated from the first Scottish press. About two years later, in 1510, the Aberdeen Breviary, the main cause of the introduction of printing into Scotland, was executed by the command and at the expense of Walter Chepman; but doubt exists as to the actual printer of this, the last but most important work of the primitive Scottish press. Neither in connection with the Breviary nor elsewhere does Androw Myllar's name again occur.
