= Edwin Roper Loftus Stocqueler =

British artist (1829–1895)

- Born: 18 November 1829; Bombay, British India
- Died: 28 October 1895 (aged 65); London, England
- Education: Rectory House School, Ealing
- Occupations: Landscape & animal artist
- Spouse: Sarah Edith Hinder (m. 1876)
- Children: 1
- Parents: Joachim Hayward Stocqueler (father); Jane Spencer (mother)

Edwin Roper Loftus Stocqueler (18 November 1829 – 28 October 1895) was a British artist who worked mainly in Australia, South Africa and Zanzibar; and, towards the end of his life, in England.

== Biography ==
=== Early life ===
Edwin Roper Loftus Stocqueler was born on 18 November 1829 in “The Bee-Hive”. in Bombay, India, to Joachim Hayward Stocqueler and Jane (née Spencer). He was baptized at St Thomas's Church, Bombay on 31 December 1829. The Roper name probably came from his father’s friendship with Henry Roper. No documented source has been found for the Loftus name, although it has been claimed that a Lord William Loftus was a godfather.

Edwin travelled from Bombay to England and back to Calcutta with his mother when he was three. In early 1836 they sailed to Liverpool on the Bombay Packet. The 1841 census shows that Edwin was at Rectory House School, Ealing which was said to have been as famous as Eton or Harrow and "the best public school in England". The reputation of this school could well be the basis for part of the incorrect assertion that he was “educated at Eton and Trinity College, Cambridge”.

Edwin received some of his art training at an early age. In a letter, much later, to the Editor of the Bendigo Advertiser Stocqueler stated that “Mr. Phaey, R.A. (since secretary to the London Art Union) refused when I was twelve years old to take any salary for teaching me drawing, for, said he ‘He can draw as well as I can.’” This perhaps indicates that “Mr Phaey” (actually Mr Fahey) was giving art lessons at Rectory House School at the time.

=== Australia ===
No record has been found of how Edwin spent the next ten years or so of his life, before he journeyed to Australia. One source has it that “Edwin Stocqueler, with his mother, sailed for Australia in 1852, encouraged by his father and the opportunity for a moving panorama of the goldfields”. In fact, they travelled separately: Edwin sailed, possibly as a crew member in 1852, and Jane arrived in Melbourne on the Gibson Craig in August 1853. There is every likelihood that Edwin was encouraged to create a visual travelogue – a diorama – of life in the goldfields. According to one newspaper report “these pictures are destined to be exhibited in the mother country”, perhaps for Edwin to follow in his father’s footsteps as an exponent of dioramas in England.

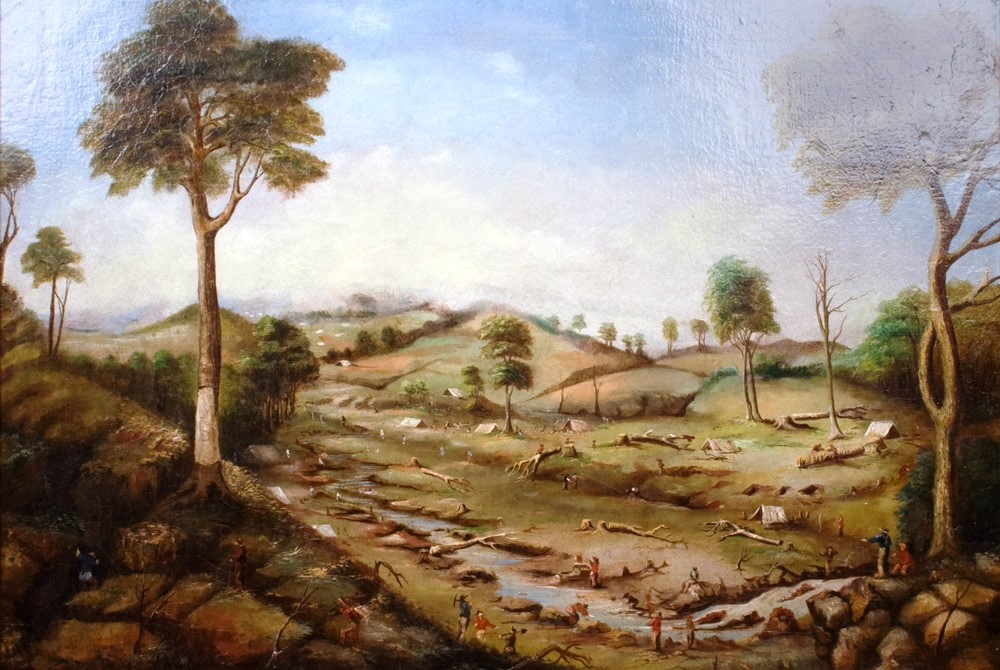
Digging for Gold, 1880, by E. Stocqueler, after sketches of 1854

The earliest record of Stocqueler in Australian newspapers seems to be the mention of his painting (coincidentally) of The Beehive, an area of canvas tenements on Camp Street, Bendigo, dated 1853, which lends support to the emigration date.

Edwin spent the first few years of his time in Australia painting life in the goldfields, and scenes of aboriginal people. He and his mother later travelled on the major rivers of Australia, principally the Murray, with each exploiting their artistic talents:

Mr. E. R. Stocqueler is an artist and naturalist of considerable merit, and who only requires that some feeling nature, backed by influence, should extend to him his patronage, and bring him into notice, to enable him no longer to pine in obscurity and dread, or sense of indigence. He has travelled considerably in the far distant wilds of the country, his companion being no less a person than his mother, a woman of cultivated tastes, and rather a good painter of flowers.

This report and its date indicate that the pair had set off on their journey around July or August 1856, returning April/May 1857.

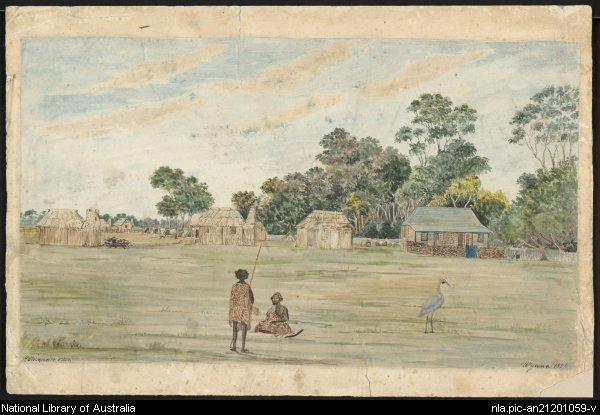
Aboriginal figures and brolga near Wyuna, Victoria, 1856, E. Stocqueler.

These dates fit with those of some known Stocqueler paintings: Pall Mall, 1856, which “records the buildings, townsfolk and landscape [of Bendigo], while Aboriginal figures and brolga near Wyuna, Victoria, “shows the settlement of Wyuna, which is about 80 k. [50 miles] north-east of Bendigo, in 1856”, a location that perhaps indicates the route the Stocquelers took from Bendigo to the river.

It was during the explorations on the Murray that Edwin is said to have seen the bunyip, defined by the Oxford English Dictionary as “a fabulous monster inhabiting the rushy swamps and lagoons in the interior of Australia”. Newspaper reports as far back as 1845 introduced readers to the discovery of “a fragment of the knee joint of some gigantic animal” which, when shown to a local aboriginal he at once “recognised it as belonging to the ‘Bunyip,’ which he declared he had seen. On being requested to make a drawing of it, he did so without hesitation.” An 1857 report in Border Post made a strong claim:

The existence of this supposed fabulous animal is likely to be proved at no distant period. Mr. Stocqueler, who has travelled several hundred miles up and down the Murray and Goulburn rivers in a canvas boat […] has favoured us with a view of his portfolio [of sketches]. Amongst the […] drawings we noticed a likeness of the bunyip, or rather a view of the neck and shoulders of the animal.

The report, which was widely syndicated, continued with a detailed description of the beast, apparently provided by Stocqueler. In a letter to the Bendigo Advertiser Edwin made clear his dislike of the way the story had been written up: “In the first place, I did not call it the Bunyip, nor did I ever say positively the size of it, as I never saw the whole of one”, continuing “However, I know more about it than I am at present disposed to tell; but when my diorama (in which is an almost life size portrait of the beast) is painted, I shall give a full, true, and particular account of what I saw, did, and discovered.”

Later in 1857, soon after his return from the river trip, Edwin set up a diorama in Bendigo, the details of which are well described by Mimi Colligan. Edwin’s use of this form of public presentation – successfully exploited by his father in London – seemed to have had less appeal in Australia. Nonetheless, some shows were taken further afield – e.g. the Diorama of the Golden Land of the Sunny South was shown in Melbourne in 1859

=== India and Zanzibar ===
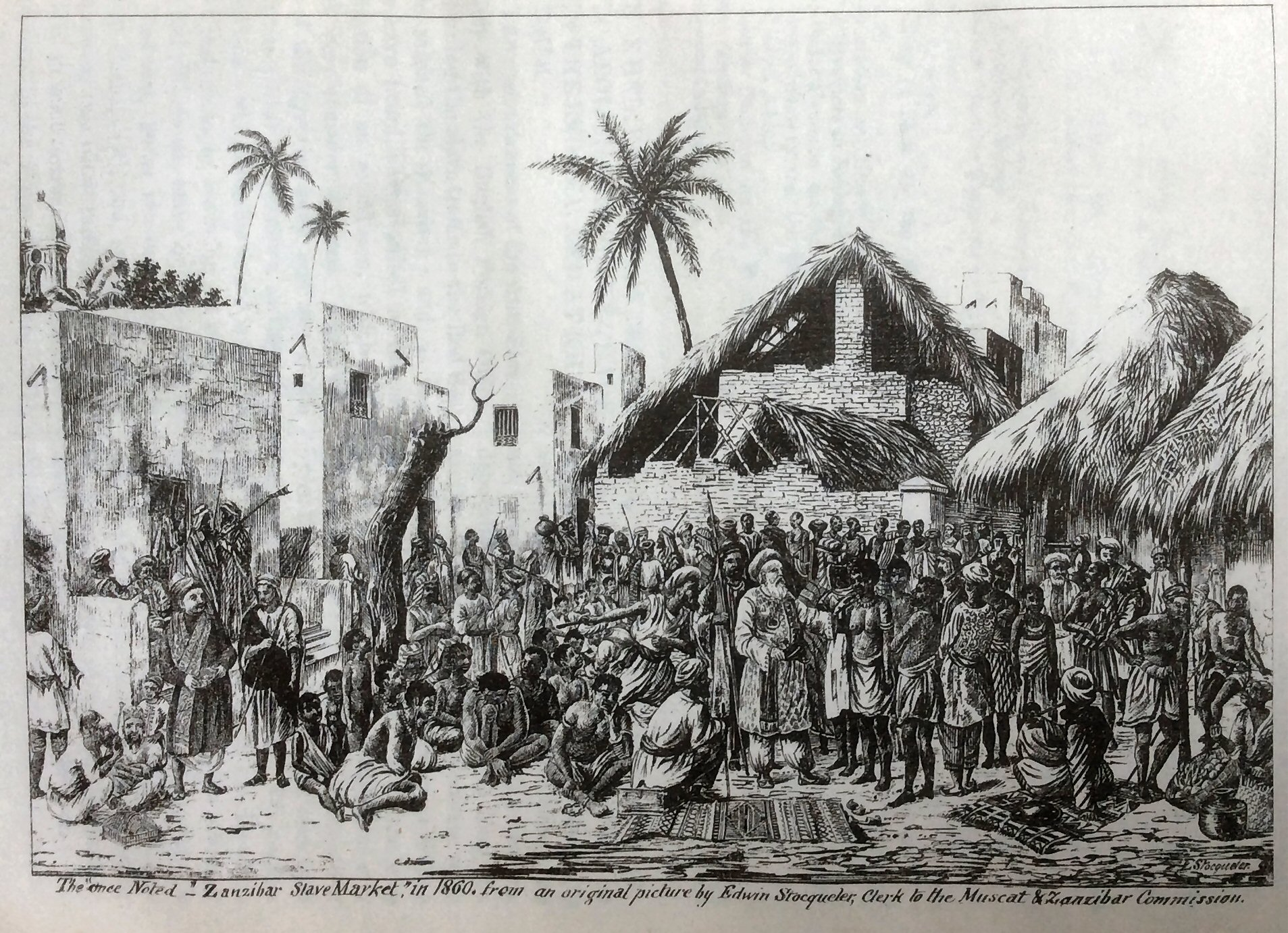
Zanzibar Slave Market in 1860, from an original picture by Edwin Stocqueler.

Newspaper reports of Edwin Stocqueler in Australia cease in 1859. He and his mother left on the Benares on 17 May 1860 for Bombay, the home of the Spencer family. Soon after arriving, Stocqueler “accompanied the British commissioner in Aden, (the then) Colonel Coghlan, to Muscat and Zanzibar to investigate the cause of conflict between the sons of the deceased Sayyid Said. The Muscat and Zanzibar Commission, on which Edwin acted as Clerk, also made enquiries concerning the slave-trade.” It is not clear why this sudden change of interest began, or when and where Edwin met Sir William Coghlan, but in 1876 Stocqueler was referred to the Anti-Slavery Society by Sir Bartle Frere, and in the following year several of his drawings were published in the Society’s journal; these help date his involvement, and again demonstrate his artistic skill.

At some point in this period Edwin met Gertrude Harriet Williams in India; they married at the Free Church, Bombay on 10 Aug 1861. A son born 1863 died that same year, and a daughter was born in 1864.

=== South Africa ===
Gertrude then moved to Natal province, South Africa, where she gave birth to a son in 1867. It is not known exactly when Edwin moved to South Africa, or why that destination was chosen. Some of his paintings of the period, including one of Durban in 1870, have been recorded. Gertrude died in 1872.

=== England ===
Having returned to England in the 1870s, Stocqueler married Sarah Edith Hinder (1854-1911) in 1876. They had one child. Stocqueler by now was a “landscape and animal painter”, a description he perhaps adopted in England after painting “A hunter named ’Elaine’” in 1885.

There are two of his paintings, each of Great Amwell Church, Hertfordshire, signed but not dated, now held in Hertford Museum. They were purchased at an auction in 1938, but the museum knows nothing more about them.

By the 1880s, Stocqueler had clearly fallen on hard times. A friend from Bendigo days, Charles Walsh Pugh, came across Edwin in London and reported that Stocqueler “had seen better days”, something made even more clear in the announcement of Edwin’s death:

SAD END OF A GRANDSON OF SIDDONS. – An inquest was held at Peckham yesterday concerning the death of Edwin Loftus Roper Stocqueler aged sixty-five. The deceased, who was a grandson of Mrs Siddons, the actress, was an artist in reduced circumstances, and exhibited his paintings on the pavement. His father was a private reader to the Queen for a number of years. According to the evidence of the widow, the deceased fell dead in the street while on his way to a doctor’s. Verdict—“Death from natural causes.”

Although Edwin’s father, Joachim Hayward Stocqueler, claimed to be descended from Sarah Siddons, and indeed adopted that surname when fleeing to the United States, there is no documentation to support the claim – in fact, the existing records refute Joachim’s assertion. Furthermore, nothing has been found so far to suggest that Edwin, who was baptized Stocqueler, believed that he had a Siddons ancestry.

== Drawings and Paintings ==
=== Drawings in Anti-Slavery Reporter, 1877 ===
The following drawings were published in the Anti-Slavery Reporter:

- The Once Noted Zanzibar Slave Market in 1860, from an original picture by Edwin Stocqueler, Clerk to the Muscat & Zanzibar Commission
- Slave Trade in the Red Sea—Slaves being landed at Jeddah
- A Negress and her Babe ordered to be Sold at Cairo to pay her Husband’s Debts
- Mr Farler and the Arab Slave-Traders

=== Paintings ===
A list Stocqueler’s paintings shown in the Diorama at the Eaglehawk Hotel, Tarrangower, (Victoria, Australia), 1858:

- A Hunter named 'Elaine', 1885
- Aboriginal figures and brolga near Wyuna, Victoria, 1856
- Alluvial Gold Diggings, 1877
- An Aborigine Hunting
- Australian gold diggings, ca. 1855
- Bum Boat in Carlisle Bay (Barbados)
- By the Water Hole
- Castlemaine From Ten Foot Hill
- Digging for Gold, 1880 (from sketches made in Australia 1854)
- Digging for Gold Along an Old Creek Bed, 1877
- Harbour Inlet
- Hunting Deer
- Hunting Scene
- Mountain and Lake Scenery (2)
- Night corroboree of Australian natives, 1850s
- Pall Mall, 1856
- River with Ruins in Distance
- The Beehive, Bendigo, 1853
- The Cock Fight
- The Port of Durban, Natal, South Africa, 1870
- View of Great Amwell Church (2)
- View of the Goldfields
- View of cattle watering
