= Walter Chepman =

Scottish merchant, notary and civil servant (died 1532)

- Died: 1532; St Giles Cathedral in Edinburgh
- Occupations: merchant notary civil servant
- Spouse(s): Margaret Kerkettle (1st wife); Agnes Cockburn (2nd wife)

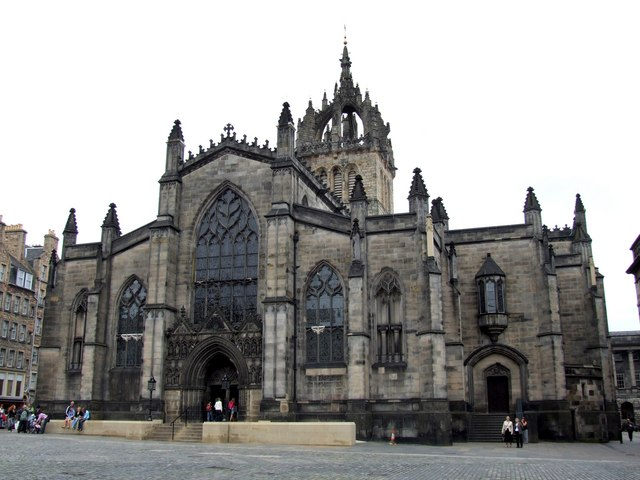
Walter Chepman was a patron of The High Kirk of Edinburgh, also known as Saint Giles' Cathedral.

Walter Chepman (died 1532) was a Scottish merchant, notary and civil servant active in the late fifteenth and early sixteenth centuries. Chepman served at the Scottish court during the reigns of James IV and James V. In partnership with Androw Myllar he established Scotland's first printing press in 1508. Chepman was also a significant patron of Saint Giles' Kirk in Edinburgh.

== Life ==
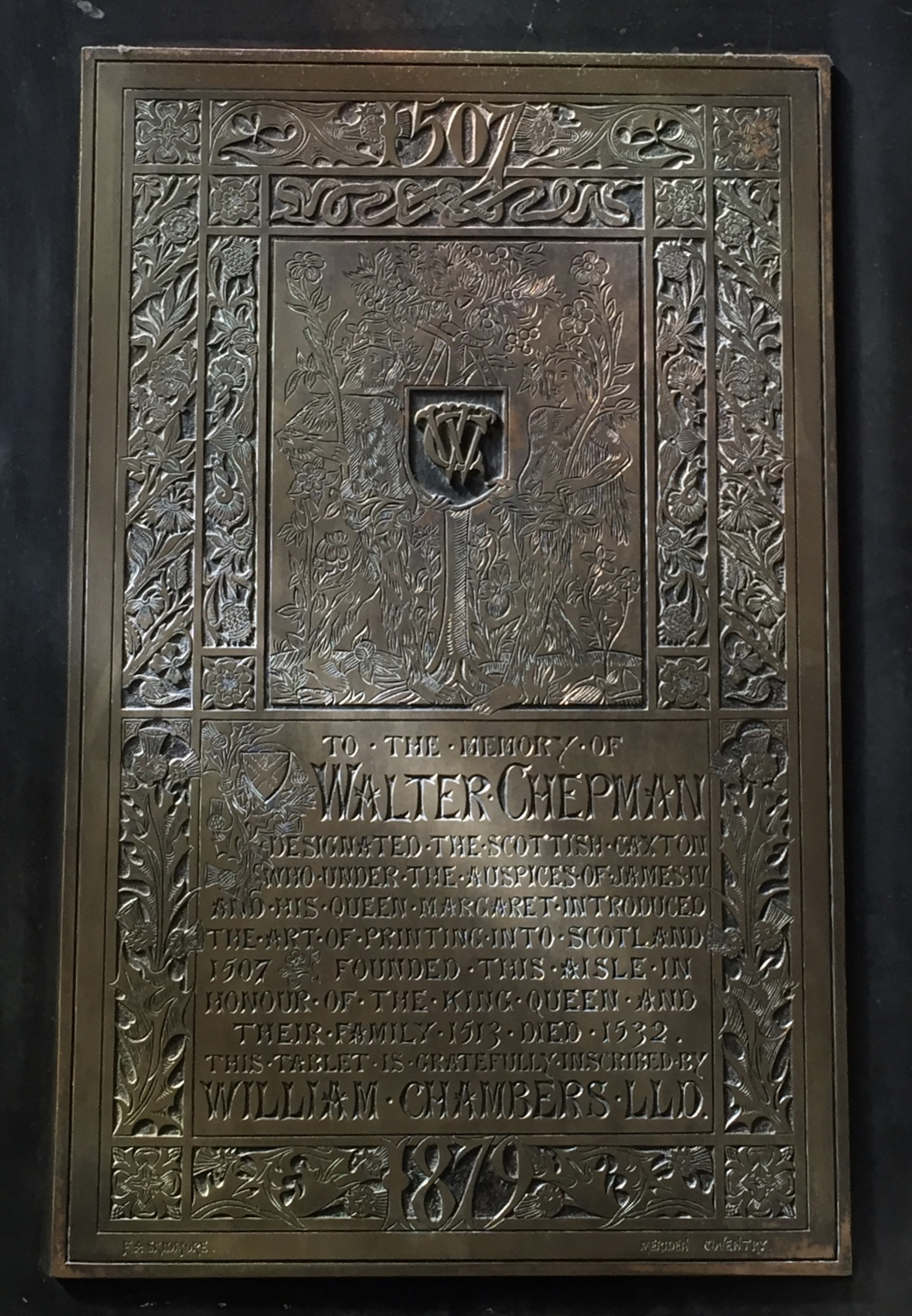
Memorial to Walter Chepman in St. Giles' Cathedral erected in 1879 by William Chambers LLD.

Chepman's first appearance in the historical record is in the accounts of the Lord High Treasurer of Scotland for 1494 in which he is recorded as receiving payment for clerical work at the royal court. He would continue to receive such payments for the remainder of his life.

The impression that Chepman was well-educated is supported by the fact that he acted as a notary in and around Edinburgh. His service at court also suggests that he was trusted by King James IV. In 1503, to coincide with the King's marriage, James presented Chepman with a suit of clothes of English fabric.

Walter Chepman traded in imported textiles and timber and regularly supplied goods to the King. He appears to have been a prosperous man. In April 1501, Chepman was involved in a property dispute with James Oliphant, Provost of the Trinity College. He owned a seven-storey tenement in Edinburgh's Royal Mile at the head of Blackfriars Wynd where he lived with his family and, at the southern end of this wynd where it joined the Southgait (later renamed Cowgate), he and Androw Myllar established their printworks in 1507.

Chepman was married twice. His first wife was Margaret Kerkettle and, after being widowed, he married Agnes Cockburn.

Chepman died in 1532 and was buried in the chapel he had established in the south aisle of the St Giles Cathedral in Edinburgh, now known as the Chepman Aisle.

== The Southgait Press ==
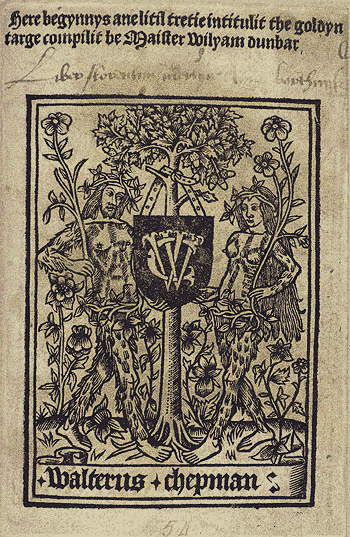
Walter Chepman's device in his print of The Goldyn Targe.

In September 1507 King James IV authorised Walter Chepman and Androw Myllar to establish a printing press and awarded the two partners a monopoly in printed books within Scotland. Androw Myllar was also a burgess of Edinburgh. He was a bookseller who had previously published books, printed in Rouen, intended for sale in England.

Chepman and Myllar's press was functional by the following Spring and was based in the Southgait of Edinburgh. Its works included a liturgical text known as The Aberdeen Breviary and 'The Chepman and Myllar Prints' which were a series of pamphlets containing popular literature in Scots and English.

The press did not have a long working life. The latest surviving example of its work is an edition of the Aberdeen Breviary dating to 1510.

== Religious Patronage ==
Walter Chepman paid for the foundation of two chapels at the Kirk of Saint Giles in Edinburgh.

The first chapel, founded in 1513 and abutting to the south of the church, offered masses for the souls of Chepman, his first wife and of the King and Queen. The equivalent part of the modern church is now known as 'The Chepman Aisle'. It contains the seventeenth century tomb of The Marquess of Montrose and a memorial plaque in honour of Walter Chepman donated by the nineteenth century publisher William Chambers.

In 1528 Chepman established a mortuary chapel, now lost, in the cemetery of Saint Giles' Kirk. It was dedicated to the performance of masses in honour of Chepman, both his wives, King James V, King James IV and all the Scots who had died at Flodden.
