= Hume (surname) =

Hume (Home is an older variant spelling of Hume, still used for the senior branches of the family) is a Scottish surname that derives from Hume Castle, Berwickshire, and its adjacent estates. The name may refer to:

- Abraham Hume (disambiguation)

- Sir Abraham Hume, 1st Baronet (1703–1772), MP for Steyning
- Sir Abraham Hume, 2nd Baronet (1749–1838)
- Abraham Hume (priest) (1814–1884), English priest and antiquary
- Abraham Hume (cricketer) (1819–1888), English clergyman and cricketer

- Alan Hume (1924–2010), English cinematographer
- Alexander Hume (1558–1609) Scottish poet
- Allan Octavian Hume (1829–1912), British administrator in India and ornithologist
- Andrew Hume, Lord Kimmerghame (1676–1730), Scottish judge and politician
- Basil Hume (1923–1999), English Roman Catholic bishop, Archbishop of Westminster
- Benita Hume (1906–1967), British film actress
- Bill Hume (footballer) (1937–2005), English-born soccer player with New Zealand and Australia
- Bill Hume (cartoonist) (1916–2009), American artist, art director, and newspaper man
- Billy Hume (1935–1990), Scottish footballer
- Bobby Hume (1941–1997), Scottish footballer
- Brit Hume Alexander Britton Hume (born 1943), American journalist with Fox News
- Caroline Howard Hume (a.k.a. Betty Hume) (1909–2008), American philanthropist and art collector
- David Hume (disambiguation)

- David Hume (1711–1776), Scottish philosopher, economist and historian.
- David Hume of Godscroft (1558–1629), Scottish historian and political theorist
- David Hume (advocate) (1757–1838), Scottish jurist and nephew of the philosopher
- David Hume (explorer) (1796–1864), South African explorer and big-game hunter
- David Hume (footballer) (1898–1964), Australian footballer
- David Hume Kennerly (born 1947), American Pulitzer–winning photographer
- David M. Hume (1917–1973), American doctor and pioneer in kidney disease research and treatment

- Donald Hume (disambiguation)

- Donald Hume (rower) (1915–2001), American rower in the 1936 Olympics
- Donald C. Hume (1907–1986), English badminton player

- Ernest Hume (1869–1912), Australian cricketer
- Gene Sheldon Eugene Hume (1908–1982), American mime actor
- Eugenia Williamson Hume (1865-1899), American elocutionist
- Fergus Hume (1859–1932), English novelist
- Fred Hume (disambiguation)

- Fred Hume (rugby league) (1898–1978), Australian rugby league player
- Fred Hume (American football), American college football quarterback

- Frederick Hume (1892–1967), mayor of Vancouver, British Columbia
- Gary Hume, British artist
- George Hume (disambiguation)

- Sir George Hume, 1st Baronet, Scottish-Irish baronet
- George Hume (politician) (1866–1946), British politician and leader of the London County Council
- George Hume (cricketer) (1800–1872), English cricketer
- George H. Hume, American heir, businessman and philanthropist
- George Sherwood Hume (1893–1965), Canadian geologist
- George Steuart Hume (1747–1788), Maryland physician and landowner

- Graham Hume, South African cricketer
- Hamilton Hume (1797–1873), Australian explorer
- Iain Hume (born 1983), Scottish-Canadian soccer player
- Ian Hume (born 1948), Scottish footballer
- J. Ord Hume (1864–1932), English brass band conductor and composer
- James Hume (disambiguation), several people

- James Hume (architect) (1798–1868), in Sydney, Australia
- James Hume (cricketer) (1858–1909), Scots-born New Zealand cricketer
- James Hume (magistrate) (1808–1862), British political commentator in Calcutta
- James Hume (mathematician) (fl. 1639), Scotsman credited with modern exponential notation
- James Hume (rugby union) (born 1998), Irish rugby union player
- James Hume (superintendent) (1823–1896), New Zealand asylum superintendent
- James B. Hume (1827–1904), lawman in the American West
- James Deacon Hume (1774–1842), English official, economic writer and advocate of free trade

- Jaquelin H. Hume (a.k.a. Jack Hume) (1905–1991), co-founder Basic American Foods, philanthropist
- Jim Hume (born 1962), Scottish Liberal Democrat politician
- Jock Hume

- Jock Hume (footballer) (1885–1962), Scottish footballer with Aberdeen
- Jock Hume (musician) (1890–1912), Scottish violinist on the RMS Titanic

- John Hume (disambiguation)

- Sir John Hume, 2nd Baronet (died 1695), Irish landowner
- John Hume (bishop) (c. 1706–1782), English bishop
- John Hume (priest) (1743–1818), Dean of the Church of Ireland
- John Basil Hume (1893–1974), British surgeon and lecturer in anatomy
- John Frederick Hume (1860–1935), miner and political figure in British Columbia
- John R. Hume, Scottish architectural historian
- John Robert Hume (c. 1781–1857), Scottish surgeon and physician
- John Walter Hulme (1805–1861), first Chief Justice of Hong Kong

- Jon Hume (born 1983), New Zealand musician
- Joseph Hume (1777–1855), Scottish doctor and Member of Parliament
- Leslie P. Hume, American historian and philanthropist
- Lindel Hume (born 1942), American politician from Indiana
- Martin Andrew Sharp Hume (1847–1910), born Martin Sharp (historian), English historian
- Mick Hume (born 1959), British journalist, editor of Spiked Online Magazine
- Patrick Hume (disambiguation)

- Patrick Hume of Polwarth (c. 1550–1609), Scottish courtier and poet of the Castalian Band
- Patrick Hume, 1st Earl of Marchmont (1641–1724), Scottish statesman
- Patrick Hume (editor) (fl. 1695), Scottish schoolmaster in London

- Paul Hume (music critic) (1915–2001), music critic for the Washington Post
- Peter Hume (politician), Canadian politician
- Rob Hume, English ornithological writer
- Rowena Hume (1877–1966), Canadian obstetrician
- Tobias Hume (c. 1569–1645), English composer, viola player and soldier
- Trai Hume (born 2002), Northern Irish footballer
- Walter Reginald Hume (1873–1943), Australian inventor and concrete pipe manufacturer
- William Hume (disambiguation)

- William Hume (Cape politician) (1837–1916), politician of the Cape Colony
- William Errington Hume (1879–1960), English physician
- William H. Hume, American architect in New York City
- William J. Hume, American heir, businessman and conservative philanthropist
- William Fraser Hume (1867–1949), British geologist

- Willie Hume (1862–1941), cyclist, first ever winner on Dunlop pneumatic tyres

== See also ==
- Home (surname)
