= John Home (disambiguation) =

John Home (1722–1808) was a Scottish writer.

John Home may also refer to:

- John Home, Lord Renton (died 1671), Lord Justice Clerk
- John Home Home (c. 1797–1860), officer of the British Army
- Multiple people of the Home baronets
  - Sir John Home, 2nd Baronet (died 1695)
  - Sir John Home, 1st Baronet (died 1675)
  - Sir John Home, 2nd Baronet (died 1706)
  - Sir John Home, 3rd Baronet (c. 1730)
  - Sir John Home, 5th Baronet (died 1737)
  - Sir John Home, 9th Baronet (1829–1849)
  - Sir John Home, 12th Baronet (1872–1938)

== See also ==
- John Hume (disambiguation)
