= David Doig =

David Doig FRSE LLD (1719–1800) was a Scottish educator, philologist and writer known for historical and philosophical works. He was Rector of Stirling High School from 1760 to 1800. Doig is also believed to have been the inventor of the tartan pattern now associated with Burberry.

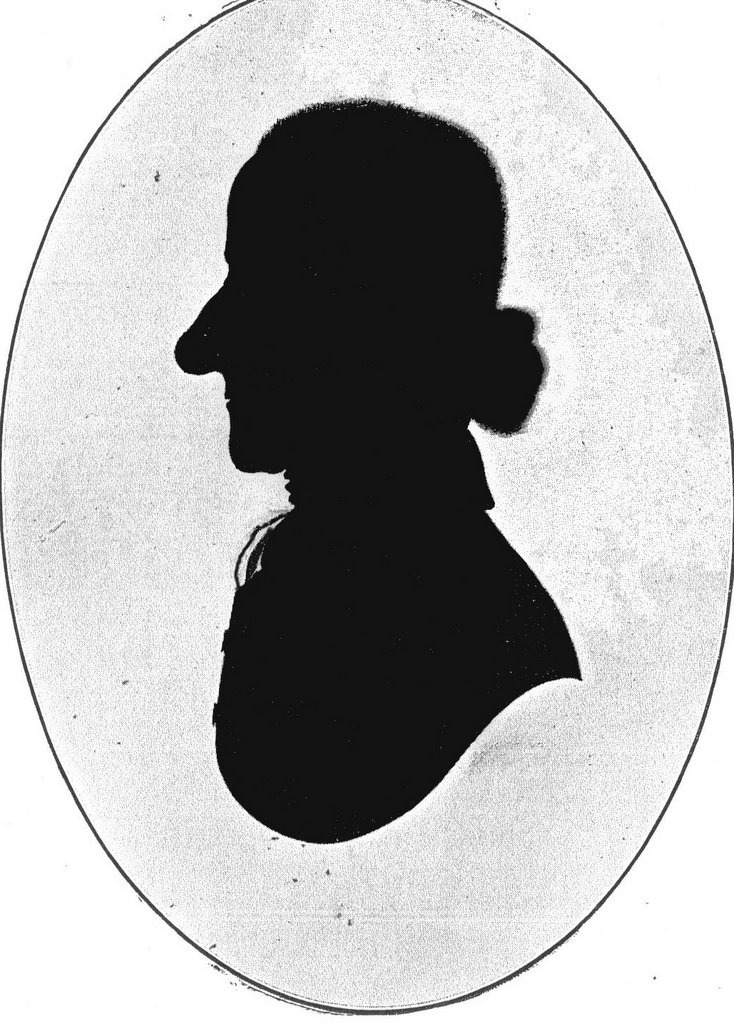
David Doig, silhouette

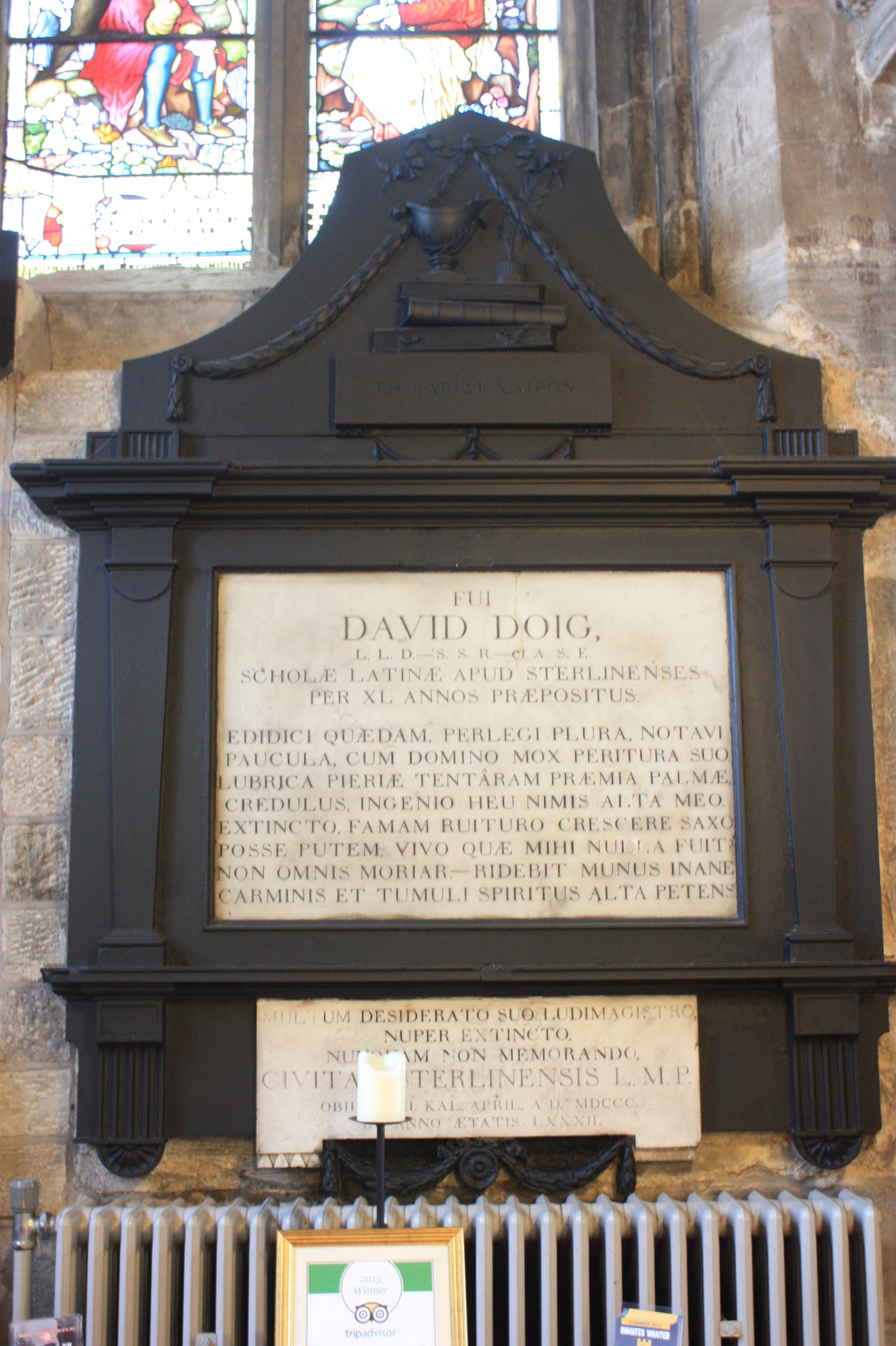
Memorial to David Doig, Church of the Holy Rude, Stirling

== Life ==
David was born 14 Feb 1719 at Mill of Melgund, Aberlemno, Angus, son of David Doig and Ann Sturrock. His father, who was a small farmer, died while he was an infant, and his mother married again. He was successful in a Latin competition for a bursary at the University of St. Andrews. Having finished the classical and philosophical course and proceeded B.A., he began the study of divinity, but scruples regarding the Westminster Confession of Faith prevented him from entering the ministry of the Church of Scotland.

Doig taught from 1749 in the parochial schools of Monifieth, Kennoway and Falkland, Fifeshire. His reputation then gained for him the rectorship of the grammar school of Stirling, a post he filled for over 40 years. In addition to Greek and Latin Doig had mastered Hebrew and Arabic. The University of Glasgow conferred on him the honorary degree of LL.D., and on the same day he received from St. Andrews his diploma as M.A. He was also elected a fellow of the Royal Society of Edinburgh, and a fellow of the Society of Antiquaries of Scotland.

Doig was elected a Fellow of the Royal Society of Edinburgh in 1798. His proposers were Dr James Gregory, Andrew Dalzell, and John Playfair.

Doig died in Stirling on 16 March 1800, aged 81. He is buried in the Holy Rude Cemetery next to Stirling Castle.

A mural tablet, with an inscription in commemoration of his virtues and learning, was raised by his friend John Ramsay of Ochtertyre. The town of Stirling also erected a marble monument to his memory, with a Latin epitaph written by himself.

== Family ==
Doig was married to Isabella Janet Bower (1727-1762) in Monifieth on 17 November 1749.

They had children: Isabella, Ann, Jean, David, George, and Patrick. Their daughter Isabella (1751-1819) married Dr. John Aird (c.1740-1790) with sons William, David, and John. The next four children died young. Patrick Doig (1762-1833) married Jane Austin (1781-1849)with a son David (1812-1819); Patrick later became a medical doctor in Antigua.

== Works ==
Doig's first known appearance in print was some twenty pages of annotation on the Gaberlunzie-man, in an edition of that and another old Scottish poem, Christ's Kirk on the Green, published in 1782 by his friend and neighbour John Callander of Craigforth. Two Letters on the Savage State, addressed to the late Lord Kaims (London, 1792) attacked the views of Lord Kames in Sketches of the History of Man (1774). The first of the letters, from 1775, had been sent to Kames, who was passing the Christmas vacation a few miles from Stirling, and who invited Doig to dinner next day.

Doig's next publication was Extracts from a Poem on the Prospect from Stirling Castle (Stirling, 1796). He contributed to vol. iii. of the Transactions of the Royal Society of Edinburgh a dissertation "On the Ancient Hellenes". He also wrote in the Encyclopædia Britannica third edition the articles on "Mythology", "Mysteries", and "Philology". They brought Doig correspondence with William Vincent and Jacob Bryant.

Besides Latin and English poems Doig left some treatises in manuscript. A partial list was in Encyclopædia Britannica, 8th edit. viii. 92.
