= Home (surname) =

Home is a surname. Notable people with the surname include:

- Alexander Home (disambiguation), multiple people
- Anna Home (born 1938), English television producer
- Anne Hunter (née Home) (1742–1821), poet and socialite
- Anthony Home (1826–1914), Scottish Victoria Cross recipient
- Daniel Dunglas Home (1833–1886), Scottish spiritualist
- David Home (disambiguation), multiple people
- Duncan Home (1828–1857), British Victoria Cross recipient
- Everard Home (1756–1832), British physician
- Francis Home (1719–1813), Scottish physician
- Gerald Home (1950–2021), Northern Irish actor
- Gordon Home (1878–1969), English artist
- Guy Home (born 1964), English cricketer
- James Everard Home (1798–1853), British Royal Navy officer
- John Home (1722–1808), Scottish poet and dramatist
- John Home, Lord Renton, Senator of the College of Justice
- Patrick Home (1728–1808), Scottish MP for Berwickshire 1784–1796
- Robert Home (1752–1834), British painter
- Stewart Home (born 1962), English artist and writer

== See also ==
- Alec Douglas-Home (1903–1995), British prime minister 1963–64
- A. M. Homes (born 1961), American writer
