= John Hume (disambiguation) =

John Hume (1937–2020) was an Irish politician and co-recipient of the 1998 Nobel Peace Prize.

John Hume may also refer to:

- Sir John Hume, 2nd Baronet (died 1695), an Irish landowner
- John Hume (bishop) (c. 1706–1782), an English bishop
- John Hume (priest) (1743–1818), a Dean of the Church of Ireland
- John Robert Hume (c. 1781–1857), a Scottish surgeon and physician
- John Walter Hulme (1805–1861), the first Chief Justice of Hong Kong
- John Frederick Hume (1860–1935), a miner, notary public and political figure in British Columbia
- Jock Hume (1885–1962), a Scottish footballer (Aberdeen)
- John Law Hume (1890–1912), a Scottish violinist on the RMS Titanic
- John Basil Hume (1893–1974), a British surgeon and lecturer in anatomy
- Jon Hume (born 1983), a New Zealand musician
- John R. Hume, Scottish architectural historian

== See also ==
- Jock Hume
- John Hulme (disambiguation)
- John Home (disambiguation)
