= George Hume =

George Hume may refer to:

- Sir George Hume, 1st Baronet (fl. 1671), Scottish-Irish baronet
- George Hume (surveyor) (1698–1760), Scottish-American surveyor and colonial official
- George Steuart Hume (1747–1788), Maryland physician and landowner
- George Hume Macartney, born George Hume (1793–1869), Irish politician
- George Hume (cricketer) (1800–1872), English cricketer
- George Hume (politician) (1866–1946), British politician and leader of the London County Council
- George Sherwood Hume (1893–1965), Canadian geologist
- Basil Hume, born George Haliburton Hume (1923–1999), English Catholic cardinal
- George H. Hume, American heir, businessman and philanthropist

== See also ==
- George Home (disambiguation)
