= The Gentle Shepherd (painting) =

Painting by David Wilkie

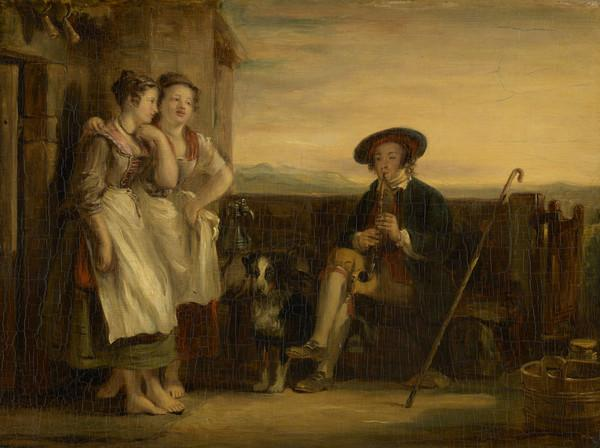
- Version in Scottish National Gallery
- Artist: David Wilkie
- Year: 1823
- Type: Oil on panel, genre painting
- Dimensions: 30.5 cm × 41.3 cm (12.0 in × 16.3 in)
- Location: Scottish National Gallery; Edinburgh

The Gentle Shepherd is a 1823 oil painting by the British artist David Wilkie. It is based on a passage from the 1725 play The Gentle Shepherd by Allan Ramsay. The painting was commissioned by the diplomat Robert Liston. It was exhibited at the Royal Institution in Edinburgh, a forerunner of the Royal Scottish Academy. It featured again at a retrospective of Wilkie's work held by the Royal Academy of Arts in London in 1842.

Several versions of the paintings exist. The original, prototype painting remained in private collections, but the best known version was purchased by the Scottish National Gallery in 1898.

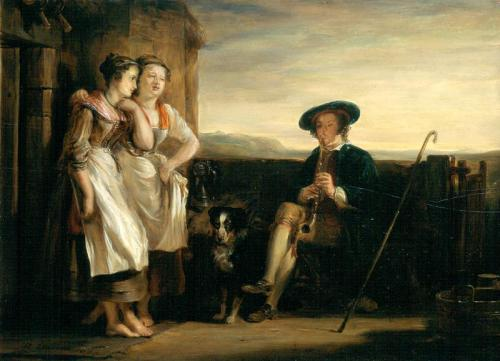
Version in Aberdeen Art Gallery

Another version exists in the Aberdeen Art Gallery which acquired it in 1972. The image was as popular one and a number of prints were produced based on it. One of those produced by the engraver James Stewart is how in the collection of the Metropolitan Museum of Art.

== See also ==
- The Cottage Toilette, an 1824 painting by Wilkie also based on the play

== Bibliography ==
- Chiego, William Joseph. Sir David Wilkie of Scotland, 1785-1841. North Carolina Museum of Art, 1987.
- Tromans, Nicholas. David Wilkie: The People's Painter. Edinburgh University Press, 2007.
