= James Hume =

James Hume may refer to:

- James Hume (architect) (1798–1868), architect in Sydney, Australia
- James Hume (cricketer) (1858–1909), Scottish-born New Zealand cricketer
- James Hume (magistrate) (1808–1862), British magistrate and political commentator in Calcutta
- James Hume (mathematician) (fl. 1639), Scottish mathematician given credit for introducing the modern exponential notation
- James Hume (superintendent) (1823–1896), New Zealand asylum superintendent
- James Hume (rugby union) (born 1998), Irish rugby union player
- James B. Hume (1827–1904), lawman in the American West
- James Deacon Hume (1774–1842), English official, economic writer and advocate of free trade
- Jim Hume (born 1962), Scottish Liberal Democrat politician

== See also ==
- James Humes (disambiguation)
