= Henry Torrens =

Henry Torrens may refer to:

- Sir Henry Torrens (British Army officer, born 1779) (1779–1828), Adjutant-General to the Forces
- Sir Henry Torrens (British Army officer, born 1833) (1833–1889), British army officer and colonial governor
- Henry Whitelock Torrens (1806–1852), British essayist

== See also ==
- Henry Torrens Anstruther (1860–1926), British politician
