= Baron Renton =

The title Baron Renton can refer to:

A senator of the College of Justice:

- John Home, Lord Renton (1600–1671)

Members of the House of Lords:

- David Renton, Baron Renton (1908–2007; created a life peer in 1979).
- Tim Renton, Baron Renton of Mount Harry (1932–2020; created a life peer in 1997).

As David Renton was created a peer some years before Timothy Renton, the title Baron Renton, without qualification, is more likely to refer to David Renton. The two are not related.
