= Hume baronets of North Berwick (c.1638) =

Escutcheon of the Hume baronets of North Berwick

The Hume baronetcy, of North Berwick, was created in the Baronetage of Nova Scotia c. 1638 for George Hume or Home. He was the son of Sir John Hume, Member of the Irish Parliament for County Fermanagh, a Scot of North Berwick and Ardgorte (Ardgart townland). He married Mary Maynard, daughter of Sir William Maynard of Curriglasse, County Cork.

On the death of the 4th Baronet in 1747 the title became either extinct or dormant.

== Hume baronets, of North Berwick (1671) ==
- Sir George Hume, 1st Baronet (died c.1657)
- Sir John Hume, 2nd Baronet (died 1695)
- Sir Gustavus Hume, 3rd Baronet (c.1670–1731)
- Sir Charles Hume, 4th Baronet (died 1747)
