= Horace Evans, 1st Baron Evans =

Welsh physician (1903–1963)

The Right Honourable The Lord Evans GCVO
- Evans in 1962
- Born: Horace Evans; 1 January 1903; Dowlais, Merthyr Tydfil, Wales
- Died: 26 October 1963 (aged 60); King Edward VII's Hospital, London, England
- Occupation: General physician
- Known for: Physician to the British royal family
- Spouse: Helen Aldwyth Davies (m. 1929)
- Father: Harry Evans

Horace Evans, 1st Baron Evans, GCVO (1 January 1903 – 26 October 1963), was a Welsh general physician known for serving the British royal family.

The son of musician Harry Evans, Evans left his studies in music at age 18 years to pursue a career in medicine. With Sir Arthur Ellis of the London Hospital Medical College, he worked on Bright's disease and on the relationship between nephritis (inflammation of the kidneys) and hypertension (high blood pressure). Evans was the personal physician to King George VI and conferred with Sir Clement Price Thomas during the king's illness and famous lung surgery in 1951.

According to historian Peter Hennessy, Evans was "probably the leading general physician of his generation". However, in 1953, he referred foreign minister Anthony Eden for an operation, from which Eden's health never fully recovered, an operation which has been the subject of much discussion.

One of his daughters died in an accident at a young age and both Evans and his wife died in 1963, leaving the barony extinct.

== Early life and education ==
Evans was born and grew up in Dowlais near Merthyr Tydfil, the son of the prominent musician Harry Evans and Edith Gwendolen (née Rees). He received his early education at Liverpool College. His younger brother, Hubert, became a diplomat, ambassador to Nicaragua between 1952 and 1954. His family soon moved to Liverpool when his father was offered the role of conductor of the Liverpool Welsh Choral Union and therefore Evans was sent to Liverpool College for his education. Following the death of his father, he took up studies at the Guildhall School of Music at the age of 12 years and subsequently went to the City of London School. By the age of 18 years, he decided on a career in medicine, and with a science scholarship, studied at the London Hospital medical college from 1921 to 1928. In 1925, he acquired the conjoint diploma of MRCS, LRCP. This inspiration to pursue a career in medicine possibly came from his grandfather who was a pharmacist.

== Early career ==
Becoming assistant to the medical unit at the London Hospital by 1929, Evans developed a close connection with Sir Arthur Ellis and Clifford Wilson. However, his first attempt at MRCP was not successful and he had to retake in 1930. During the same year he acquired an MD. His first job was as house physician to Sir Arthur and he was supported by Sir Arthur right from the beginning of his career.

He then gained a wide range of clinical experience by taking up posts in surgery, obstetrics, anaesthetics and pathology. By 1933, Evans was the medical unit's assistant director. He was selected as assistant physician at the London Hospital in 1936. By 1947, he was full physician. Together with Sir Arthur, they became renowned for their work on Bright's disease and the link between hypertension and nephritis. During the war, this research was presented by Sir Arthur in the Croonian lectures of 1941 at the Royal College of Physicians.

== The royal physician ==
Evans continued his career at the London Hospital and became physician to Queen Mary in 1946, following the death of Lord Dawson of Penn and at the recommendation of Lord Webb-Johnson, president of the Royal College of Surgeons. He was later physician to her son, King George VI from 1949, receiving a knighthood (Knight Commander of the Royal Victorian Order) in the same year. and to her granddaughter, Queen Elizabeth II, from 1957. In addition, in 1957 he was created Baron Evans, of Merthyr Tydfil in the County of Glamorgan.

Evans was part of the team that looked after King George VI during his ill health with lung problems and up until his death.

== Evans and Anthony Eden ==
The gallbladder operation of Anthony Eden in 1953 has prompted much debate. Eden had been unwell with upper abdominal pains since 1945. Frequent attacks of pain requiring strong painkillers and periods of rest prompted more extensive investigations. An X-ray demonstrated gallstones, and Eden being an important politician, the royal physician was called for advice. In light of recurrent biliary tract infections, Evans recommended an operation. Three surgeons were recommended and the ultimate decision, taken by Eden, was that John Basil Hume, surgeon from St Bartholomew's Hospital was to perform the surgery in 1953. Hume had previously performed Eden's appendectomy. It is agreed that the initial operation resulted in biliary tract damage, a complication well recognised at the time, and much corrective surgery was needed later by Richard Cattell, again a recommendation of Evans. That the surgery should be done in the United States was objected to by Winston Churchill, who felt that if the king had his operation on a "kitchen table'," Eden could at least have his in a London hospital, but Evans and Cattell visited them at 10 Downing Street and agreed the transfer abroad. During the Suez Crisis, Evans was consulted on numerous occasions by Eden. On Eden's visit to New Zealand in 1957, Evans made notes for doctors should he require medical assistance whilst abroad:

His general health during the past year has been maintained with extensive vitamin therapy—sodium amytal gr 3 and seconal enseal gr 1.5 every night and often a tablet of Drinamyl every morning. These treatments have only become really essential during the past six months. Before his rest in Jamaica the general condition was one of extreme over-strain with general physical nerve exhaustion, and at this time he seemed to be helped by rest, some increase in the sedation and Vitamin B.12 therapy.

== Family ==
Evans married Helen Aldwyth Davies in 1929. She was the daughter of a former High Sheriff of Glamorganshire who spent much of life unwell. The younger of their two daughters died by accidental electrocution. Both Helen and Evans died in 1963. He died in October 1963, aged 60, when the barony became extinct.

== Personality ==
Towering and marginally slouched, he wore horn-rimmed glasses and enthused confidence in those who sought his advice, whether patient or colleague. Calm and composed during a crisis, his opinions were highly regarded.

== Legacy ==
Evans will be remembered as one of the most widely known physician names of his time along with Lord Dawson of Penn and Lord Horder.

He has been widely quoted as the "last of the great physicians". In a speech in 1958 he stated:

"Have you noticed how your patients watch you with an intensity rarely given, even to an actress? Every word you utter, every action you make has a special significance for good or ill, which carries an impression perhaps undreamed of. A sick patient is peculiarly sensitive to any word or action which is not completely sincere. The slightest suggestion of any insincerity can create frustration and despair."

Many of the controversies may never be solved. Evans was of a time when "patient's secrets went to the grave with them".

Evans was unwell in his later years, requiring major abdominal surgery in 1962. Never fully recovering, he died in 1963 at the age of 60 years.

== See also ==
List of Welsh medical pioneers

Peerage of the United Kingdom
New creation	Baron Evans; 1957–1963	Extinct
