= Jock Hume =

Jock Hume may refer to:

- Jock Hume (footballer) (1885–1962), Scottish professional footballer
- Jock Hume (musician) (1890–1912), Scottish musician, died aboard RMS Titanic

== See also ==
- John Hume (disambiguation)
