= David Home (disambiguation) =

David Home (1558–1629) was a Scottish historian.

David Home may also refer to:

- David Milne-Home (1805–1890), Scottish advocate, geologist and meteorologist
- David Milne Home (politician) (1838–1901), British soldier and Conservative politician
- David Douglas-Home, 15th Earl of Home (born 1943), British businessman and Conservative politician
- Sir David Home, 1st Baronet (died 1650) of the Home baronets
- Sir David George Home, 13th Baronet (1904–1992) of the Home baronets

== See also ==
- David Hume (disambiguation)
- Home (surname)
