= Edward Hutton =

Edward Hutton may refer to:

- Edward Francis Hutton (1875–1962), American financier
- Edward Hutton (British Army officer) (1848–1923), Australian, British, and Canadian military commander
- Edward Hutton (writer) (1875–1969), British author
