= Bill Hume =

Bill Hume may refer to:

- Bill Hume (footballer)
- Bill Hume (cartoonist)
