= Andrew Hume =

Andrew Hume may refer to:

- Andrew Ernest Hume (1869–1912), Australian cricketer
- Andrew Hume, Lord Kimmerghame (1676–1730), Scottish judge and politician
