= Fred Hume =

Fred Hume may refer to:

- Frederick Hume (1892–1967), mayor of Vancouver, British Columbia
- Fred Hume (rugby league) (1898–1978), Australian rugby league player
- Fred Hume (American football), American college football quarterback in 1901
