= Babysan =

American comic strip

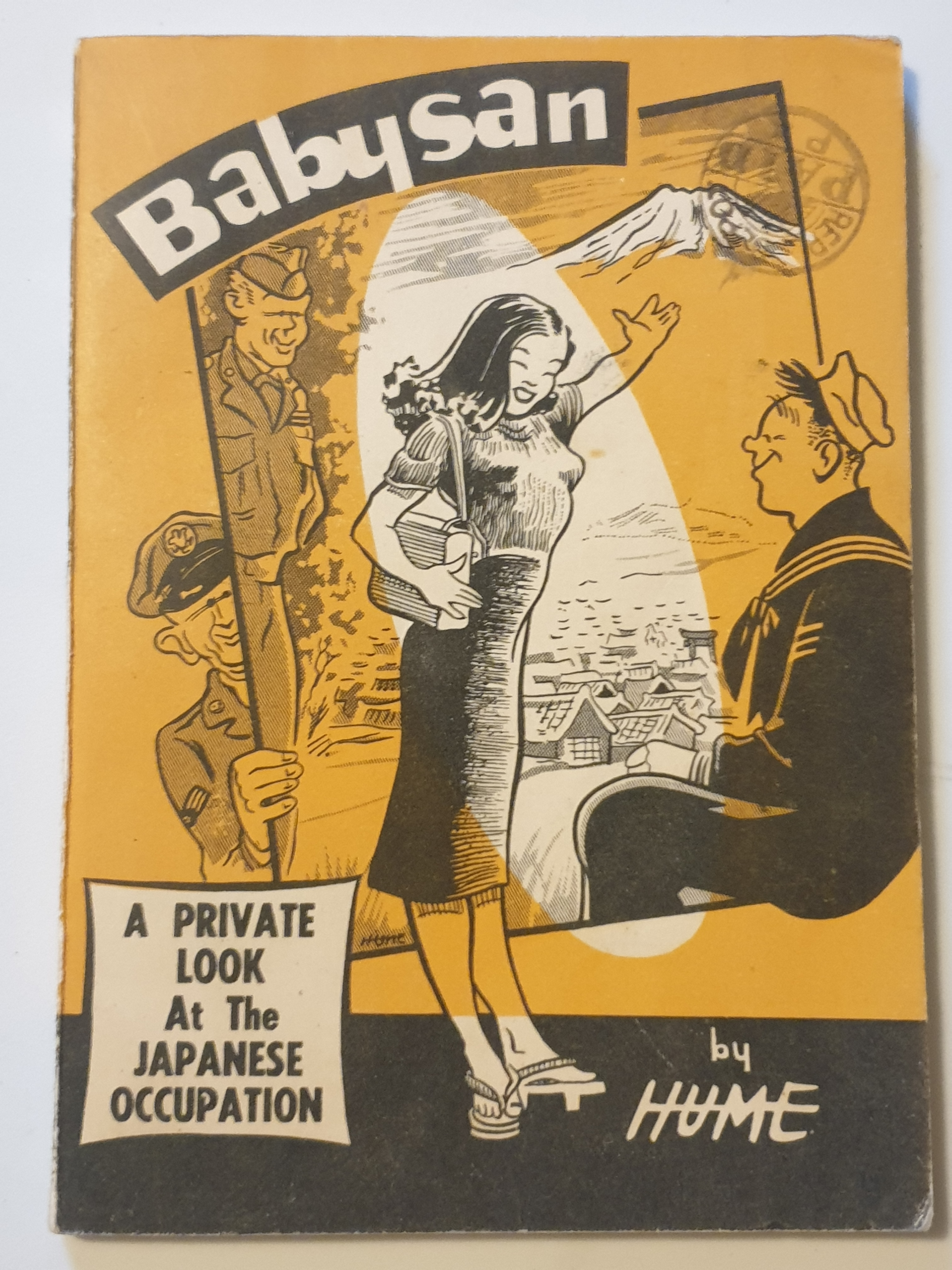
Babysan, by Bill Hume (1953)

Babysan was a comic created by American artist Bill Hume while he was stationed in Japan in the 1950s. The comic depicts American sailors interacting with a pin-up style Japanese woman named Babysan. The title comes from the word "baby" an affectionate term Americans use and "san" which is a Japanese honorific. An English equivalent would be "Ms. Baby". The comic became incredibly popular with United States service members in Japan by mixing good humor with culture, language, and sex. Babysan attempted to show some of the give and take between American and Japanese cultures during the occupational era. The comic plays on misunderstanding and sexuality. Although controversial for its fetishization of Asian women, Hume defended his work saying "I didn't invent Babysan, I just reported life as it was."

== History ==
Bill Hume was a member of the United States Navy during World War II (1942–1945). He left the Navy in 1945 and married. In 1951, he was recalled to be part of the occupying force in Japan. Hume served as a petty officer in charge of maintaining good order and discipline and was also the editor of the station newspaper, The Oppaman. Through his observations of life in Japan, the effects American sailors were having on the culture, and the effects the Japanese culture was having on the sailors Hume created Babysan, originally a pinup poster, to help boost morale. Babysan became a hit with the sailors of Fleet Airforce Service Squadron 120 and this popularity spread to the Navy Times and finally to the United States when servicemen began returning home. Hume returned to the United States in 1952, teamed up with John Annarino, and four books based on Babysan were published shortly after.

== Content ==
Babysan gave a view of post-war Japan through the eyes of an American servicemember. Their love of American movies, American dance, and western clothing comes in stark contrast to the society of the recent past. Bill Hume rarely, if ever, depicts Japanese men in his comics and these cultural changes may or may not have impacted them at the time but when the Japanese women began adopting them, the American servicemen felt more relaxed and accepting. Although naive and innocent the character of Babysan was able to teach Americans a little bit about customary practices such as taking off shoes before entering a house, the hibatchi, the kimono, food, and money. It also included common Japanese words and a rudimentary explanation of writing even though some arrogant American sailors already seemed to know it all. In addition to entertaining the troops, Babysan also provided a glimpse of what to expect and how they might be perceived in their new home.

This semi-pornographic comic often featured Babysan partially nude and flirting. In one comic, she reminded creator Bill Hume that "Japanese girls like to wear clothes, too." Servicemen may have imagined Cio-Cio San in Puccini's Madame Butterfly as the typical Japanese girl but what they got instead was Babysan. This Japanese woman was self-motivated with her own problems and desires. Tight fitting clothing, blunt talk, and comfort with nudity made Babysan irresistible to servicemen of every rank and when they got jealous they accused her of "butterflying". This term meant being unfaithful but Babysan never accepted this description, she would disagree in her broken English and say that she had not butterflied, she had changed her mind. Babysan also desired money. She goes from one serviceman to another flirting asking questions like "Why you all time bring candy- why never bring okane(money)?"(33) or "Why never have liberty on payday?". (83) This was not prostitution however. It was payment for services to be sure but "Babysan never forgot the acts of kindness on the part of the American. She decided...to devote herself to the part of the American...There wasn't much sense in restricting her charms to one." She entertained them with her beauty, femininity, charm, and energy. And unlike Cio-Cio San, Babysan was not upset when Americans left for home, as she was waving goodbye to them she was already looking towards the future, and to yet another serviceman.

== Impact ==
Babysan made light of the tumultuous situation in Japan during the 1940s and 50s. Although not intended to be a textbook on Japanese custom and tradition Hume's works certainly contained elements of both. These were combined with some of the charming things in Japan, including the most charming thing to the United States servicemen according to Hume, the Japanese girl. Babysan disarmed the sailors and soldiers with her beauty and ability to adopt new things and through her they were able to enjoy the food, the language, and the culture during their short tours in Japan. It is not a widely known work but among many in the field, it is highly respected.

The term "babysan," along with "mamasan" saw widespread use during America's involvement in the Vietnam War throughout the 1960s. It was often used to describe pretty Vietnamese young women.
