= George Home =

George Home may refer to:

- George Home, 4th Lord Home (died 1549), Scottish nobleman
- George Home (Comptroller of Scotland) (1552–1615), Comptroller of the Scottish Exchequer
- George Home, 1st Earl of Dunbar (c. 1556–1611)
- Sir George Home, 7th Baronet (died 1803)

== See also ==
- George Hume (disambiguation)
