= Abraham Hume =

Abraham Hume may refer to:

- Sir Abraham Hume, 1st Baronet (1703–1772), MP for Steyning
- Sir Abraham Hume, 2nd Baronet (1749–1838)
- Abraham Hume (priest) (1814–1884), English priest and antiquary
- Abraham Hume (cricketer) (1819–1888), English clergyman and cricketer
