= David Hulme =

David Hulme may refer to:

- David Hulme (rugby league) (born 1964), rugby league footballer of the 1980s and 1990s
- David Russell Hulme (born 1951), Welsh conductor
- David Hulme (academic) (born 1952), development studies professor
- David Hulme (evangelist), host of the TV series The World Tomorrow

== See also ==
- David Hume (disambiguation)
- Hulme (disambiguation)
