= James Humes =

James Humes may refer to:

- James C. Humes (born 1934), co-author of the text on the Apollo 11 lunar plaque
- Jim Humes, American judge
- Jimmy Humes (born 1942), English professional footballer

== See also ==
- James Hume (disambiguation)
