= Christis Kirk on the Green =

Anonymous poem written in about 1500 AD

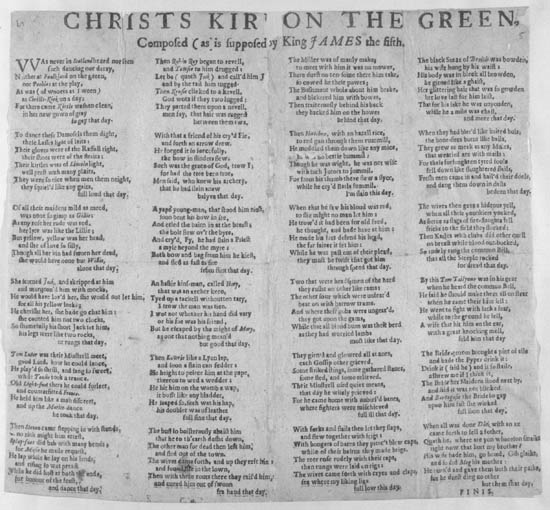
"Christis Kirk on the Green" in a broadside ballad version dating from the beginning of the 18th century

"Christis Kirk on the Green" is an anonymous Middle Scots poem in 22 stanzas, now believed to have been written around the year 1500, giving a comic account of a brawl at a country fair. It was for many years mistakenly attributed either to James I of Scotland or to James V of Scotland. It gave rise to a whole tradition of humorous poems on similar subjects by Scottish poets down the centuries, including Allan Ramsay and Robert Burns, and is still one of the most frequently published works in Middle Scots. "Christis Kirk on the Green" has been called one of the finest performances in 15th-century British poetry.

== Synopsis ==
The scene opens at Christ's Kirk where a dance is in full swing on the village green. While Tom Lutar plays the music and sings, the young women flirt with their suitors. Two of the men, Jock and Robin Ray, neither of whom has been having much luck with the girls, start to quarrel over one of them, and blows are struck. The fight begins to spread, and threatens to become serious as bows are produced and arrows shot, but the marksmanship of all the archers is so wild that no-one is hit. Then a general brawl develops as pitchforks, flails and laths of wood are seized, branches are torn off, and all these weapons are brought into play. The poet turns from one character to another, and details the blows delivered and the men struck to the ground. While the fight is still in progress the poem breaks off.

== Transmission ==
"Christis Kirk" survives in at least seven manuscripts, including the Bannatyne Manuscript, the Maitland Folio, and one of the Laing manuscripts; of these the Maitland Folio gives the best text. It was printed first in 1643 in a recension similar to that given by the Laing MS, and later in 1660, 1663, 1684, 1691 (by Edmund Gibson), and in 1706 (by James Watson).

== Date and authorship ==
The poet was certainly familiar with a tradition of Scots burlesque poems that included "Peblis to the Play" and the now-lost "Falkland on the Green", and he wrote for a sophisticated audience, or at least for one above the peasant level. These are almost the only reliable clues to his identity. In 1568 George Bannatyne attributed the poem to James I of Scotland, but in the next century an alternative attribution to James V was made, and in the 18th and 19th centuries a war of words between literary historians failed to decide between these two candidates. At the beginning of the 19th century James Sibbald suggested Robert Henryson as a possible author, but this idea did not find favour. In 1964 Allan H. Maclaine argued for an early 15th-century date, without committing himself to James I as author, but in 1996 he acknowledged that linguistic evidence suggested a date of around 1500. This new date, which is now widely accepted, rules out both James I and James V, and leaves "Christis Kirk" as an anonymous poem.

== Metre ==
The stanzas are each of ten lines rhyming ABABABABCD. The first eight lines alternate iambic tetrameter with trimeter, the ninth is a two-syllable "bob", and the final line forms the refrain "At Christis Kirk on the green". Much alliteration is used, which, together with the recurring rhymes, gives the verse a headlong pace, while the bob line is useful in accentuating the humour. The combined effect is to make the poem well-suited to recitation or singing.

== Setting ==
Most modern commentators accept the tradition, first reported in print by William Tytler in 1783, that the Christ's Kirk of the poem is a ruined church in the parish of Leslie, near the village of Insch in Aberdeenshire. According to Tytler a fair was held by this church every May Day until the end of the 17th century. In 1715 Allan Ramsay proposed a different Leslie in Fife as the site of the poem, and was seconded by John Callander in his 1782 edition of the poem. However this identification is probably based simply on a confusion of place-names, and it is no longer believed to have any good evidence in its favour. James Sibbald identified Christ's Kirk with the church of St. Salvator's College, St. Andrews, but, as with his authorship theory, this idea has found no supporters.

== Criticism ==
Critics agree that the main virtues of the poem do not lie in subtlety of descriptive detail, nor in coherence of structure, but in a fast-paced excitement and wild comic verve that suggest comparison with Dutch peasant paintings. Vividly described scenes of grotesque and earthy incident (possibly too earthy for some modern tastes) follow one after the other in rapid succession. As the literary historian George Gregory Smith wrote, "Everybody is at fever-heat: the louder the women's voices and the harder the blows, the better the fun." This forms a striking contrast with the aureate manner of the poet's contemporaries, the Scottish Chaucerians. The exigencies of rhyme-scheme and alliteration that the poet faces are very rigorous, but he meets them with such inventiveness and apparent ease that it has been called a tour de force of mastery of technique.

== Legacy ==
"Christis Kirk" and a similar earlier poem, "Peblis at the Play", exercised a noticeable influence on the makar William Dunbar, some of whose poems use similar metrical and stylistic techniques to achieve a fast-moving effect. Similar traces of the two older poems can be seen in the anonymous 16th-century "Rauf Coilyear", "The Cursing of Sir John Rowell" and "Symmie and his Bruder". In 1718 the poet Allan Ramsay published "Christis Kirk" together with two additional cantos of his own composition. This work reached a 5th edition in only five years, and so popularized the poem that few others were reprinted so many times in the 18th century. A fourth canto followed in 1766, published in Alexander Nicol's Poems on Several Subjects. One result of the poem's success was the emergence of a whole subgenre of comic poems set at fairs, country dances and similar merrymakings, and narrated by detached and amused observers, in which horseplay, practical jokes and drunkenness play a prominent part, and colourful scene-painting makes up for thin story-lines. Examples include Robert Fergusson's "Leith Races", James Orr's "Donegore Hill" and "The Passengers", Samuel Thomson's "The Simmer Fair" and "The Hawk and the Weasel" and Robert Burns's "The Jolly Beggars", "The Ordination" and "The Holy Fair". The Christis Kirk tradition continued into the 20th century in such poems as Robert Garioch's "Embro to the Ploy".

== Modern editions ==
- Craigie, W. A., ed. (1919). The Maitland Folio Manuscript. Vol. 1. Edinburgh: William Blackwood. pp. 149–155.
- Bannatyne, George (1928). Ritchie, W. Tod (ed.). The Bannatyne Manuscript Writtin in Tyme of Pest. Edinburgh: William Blackwood. pp. 262–268.
- Templeton, Janet M. (1965). "Seventeenth-century Versions of Christis Kirk on the Grene and The Wyf of Awchtirmwchty". Studies in Scottish Literature. 4 (3): 130–137. An edition of the Laing text.
- Kinghorn, A. M. (1970). The Middle Scots Poets. [London]: Edward Arnold. pp. 58–65. ISBN 0713154667. Based on the Maitland text.
