= Patrick Hume =

Patrick Hume may refer to:

- Patrick Hume of Polwarth (c. 1550–1609), Scottish courtier and poet of the Castalian Band
- Patrick Hume, 1st Earl of Marchmont (1641–1724), Scottish statesman
- Patrick Hume (editor) (fl. 1695), Scottish schoolmaster in London, author of the first commentary on John Milton's Paradise Lost
