= David Hume (disambiguation) =

David Hume (1711–1776) was a Scottish philosopher, economist, and historian.

David Hume may also refer to:

- David Hume of Godscroft (1558–1629), Scottish historian and political theorist
- David Hume (advocate) (1757–1838), Scottish jurist and nephew of the philosopher
- David Hume (explorer) (1796–1864), South African explorer and big-game hunter
- David M. Hume (1917–1973), American doctor and pioneer in kidney disease research and treatment
- David Hume Kennerly (born 1947), American Pulitzer Prize–winning photographer
- David Hume (footballer) (1898–1964), Australian footballer
- David Hume, IV, American magistrate judge on the Delaware Court of Chancery since 2025
- David Hume, a character in the science-fiction TV series Total Recall 2070

== See also ==
- David Hulme (disambiguation)
- David Home (disambiguation)
