= Edward Emily (priest) =

Edward Emily (24 May 1740 – 20 June 1792) was a Dean of the Church of Ireland.

He was born in West Clandon; educated at Westminster School and Trinity College, Cambridge; and ordained in 1766. He held livings at Chesham, Wilden, Motcombe and West Lavington. He was Dean of Derry from 1781 until 1783.

Church of Ireland titles
Preceded by William Pery	Dean of Derry; 1781–1783	Succeeded by John Hume
