= The Gentle Shepherd =

Scottish pastoral comedy

The Gentle Shepherd; a Scots Pastoral Comedy
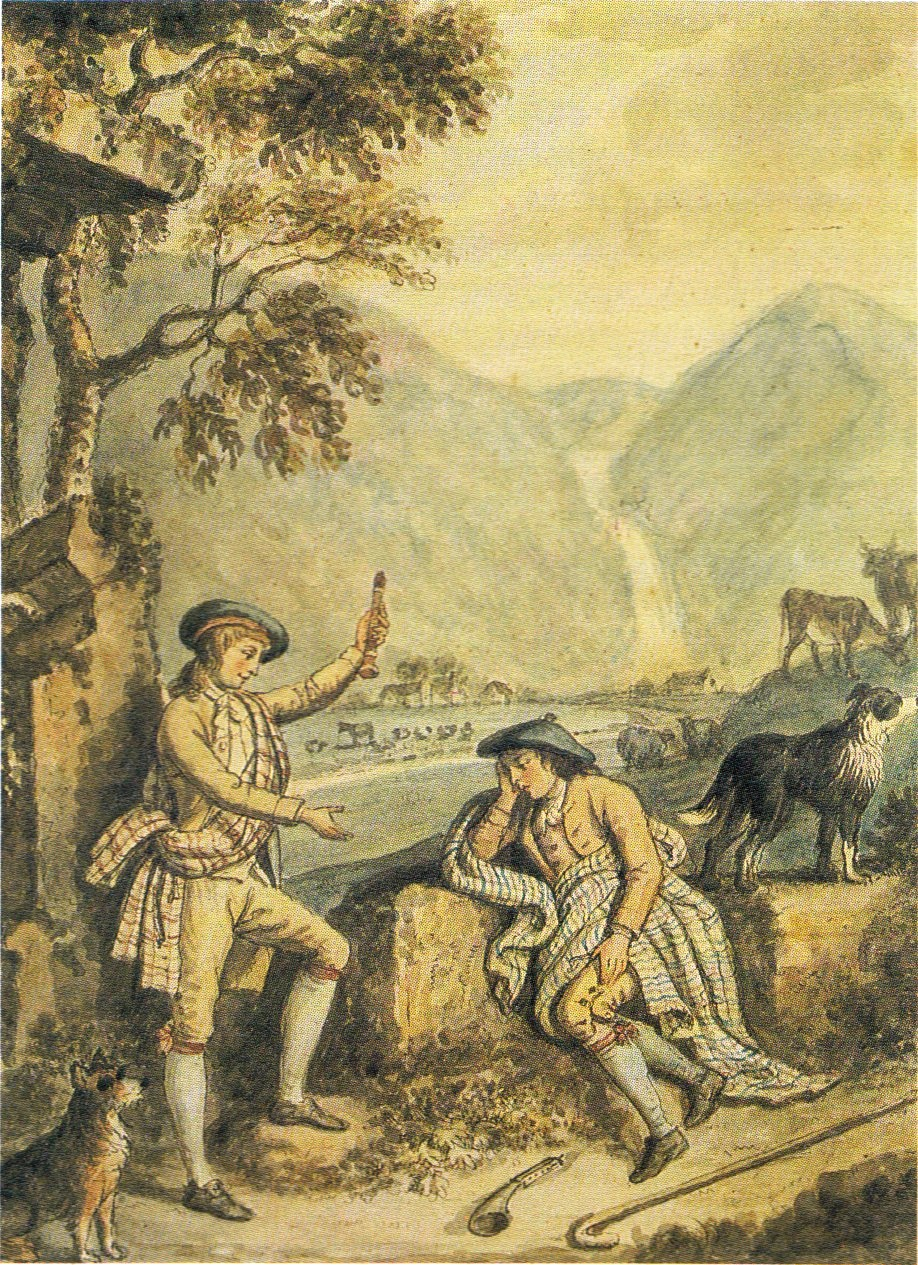
- The opening scene of Allan Ramsay's The Gentle Shepherd by David Allan (1744–96)
- Author: Allan Ramsay
- Publisher: Printed by Mr. Tho[mas] Ruddiman, for the author, sold at his shop near the Cross, and by Mr. Thomas Longman in Pater-noster-Row, and Mr. James M'Ewin, opposite to St. Clement's Church, book-sellers in London, and by Mr. Alexander Carmichael in Glasgow
- Publication date: 1725
- Publication place: Edinburgh, Scotland, United Kingdom
- Media type: Hardcover
- Pages: 89
- OCLC: 228748070

The Gentle Shepherd is a pastoral comedy by Allan Ramsay. It was first published in 1725 and dedicated to Susanna Montgomery, Lady Eglinton, to whom Ramsay gifted the original manuscript.

The play has some happy descriptive scenes and is a pleasant delineation of rustic manners in the countryside of the Scottish Lowlands in the 18th century. The backdrop is believed to have been inspired by the Penicuik area some eight miles south west of Edinburgh where Ramsay was frequently the guest of his patron Sir John Clerk of Penicuik at Penicuik House.

== First Scottish opera ==
The Italian style of classical music was probably first brought to Scotland by the Italian cellist and composer Lorenzo Bocchi, who travelled to Scotland in the 1720s, introducing the cello to the country and then developing settings for lowland Scots songs. He possibly had a hand in the first Scottish opera, the pastoral The Gentle Shepherd, with libretto by the makar Allan Ramsay.

== Productions ==
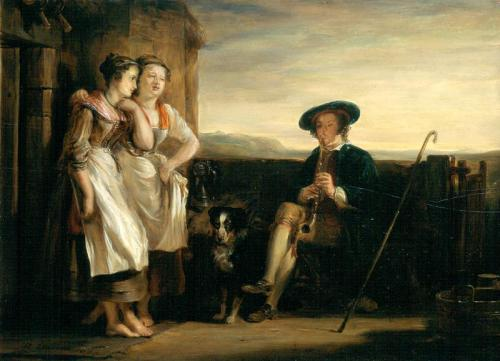
The Gentle Shepherd by David Wilkie, 1823

An adaptation of The Gentle Shepherd by Robert Kemp was staged at the Assembly Hall of the Church of Scotland in Edinburgh under the direction of Tyrone Guthrie during the Edinburgh International Festival in August 1949.

The play was staged by the Royal Scottish Academy of Music and Drama as a Festival production at the Signet Library in August 1986.

The first complete recording of The Gentle Shepard, by the Makaris ensemble, was scheduled to be released on March 7, 2025.

== Adaptations ==
In 1730, Theophilus Cibber adapted the The Gentle Shepherd as Patie & Peggy; or, The Fair Foundling, a one act afterpiece for the London stage. It was performed six times at the Theatre Royal, Drury Lane during the 1730-31 season, with Theophilus playing the part of Roger, and once at Goldman's Fields Theatre in 1735.
