= William Hulme (disambiguation) =

William Hulme may refer to:

- William Hulme (British Army officer) (1788–1855), commanded the 96th Regiment of Foot
- William Hulme (c.1631–1691), English lawyer, landowner and founder of the Hulme Trust
- William Hulme's Grammar School, Manchester, England

== See also ==
- William Hume (disambiguation)
