= Edward Hutton (writer) =

British author

- Born: 12 April 1875; Hampstead, London, UK
- Died: 20 August 1969 (aged 94)
- Writing career
- Genre: travel literature

Edward Hutton (12 April 1875 – 20 August 1969) was a British author of travel books and various Italian subjects. During World War II he aided in the protection of Italian historical sites.

== Life and work ==
Edward Hutton was born in Hampstead, London, his father being a businessman with interests in Sheffield. He was educated at Highgate School but on the death of his father in 1890 his mother removed with her six children to Somerset and Edward went as a day boy to Blundell's School, Tiverton. From an early age he applied himself to the study of the Greek and Roman classics. Instead of going up to Oxford, and having decided he was to be a writer, he chose to work in publishing in London. An unrewarding first position gave place to one with John Lane, founder of the Bodley Head, and publisher of the major works of 'the nineties' (which significantly influenced his style). Inheriting £5000 on his coming of age in 1896 he made his first journey to Italy and from then on he spent most of his life getting to know the Italians and their civilization. In 1898 he married Charlotte Miles, daughter of George Miles, a tea merchant in the City of London. From around 1901 they rented the Villa di Boccaccio at Settignano above Florence, which city became Hutton's spiritual home. The many English residents there who became his friends included Bernard Berenson and Norman Douglas while in 1917 he was instrumental with others in establishing the British Institute of Florence. When he was 27 he published his first books on Italian themes, Italy and the Italians, and Studies in the Lives of the Saints. His love of Italy and the Italian way of life led to his conversion to Roman Catholicism in 1928.

In 1905 he published the first of his series of nine illustrated books on different regions of Italy, The Cities of Umbria. His writing was not confined to Italy, however, and there were single books on Greece and Spain and also three in the Highways and Byways series, on Somerset, Wiltshire and Gloucestershire.

The Second World War with its threat to Italy's cultural heritage caused him great distress but he was influential in saving some of this by producing extensive lists for the Allied Intelligence Corps of what it was essential to protect. During these dark days he took on another role as designer of a cosmatesque floor for Westminster Cathedral and another for Buckfast Abbey. After the war he published a valuable book cataloguing the surviving Cosmati pavements in Italy. During the 1950s he revisited the themes of six of his earlier works. Completely revised and re-written, now with black and white photographs and published by Hollis and Carter, they are essentially new books.

Hutton was highly honoured by Italy for his services to that country. In 1917 he was made a Cavaliere of the Order of the Crown of Italy; at age 83 the Italian government conferred on him the Commendatore of the Order of Merit of the Italian Republic and at 90 he was awarded the Medaglia culturale d'oro.

For fifty years Hutton lived in Clifton Hill, St John's Wood, London, in a house once occupied by the Victorian painter William Powell Frith (who is commemorated by a blue plaque on the façade). He died on 20 August 1969; his wife had died in 1960.

== Works ==
- My Lady's Sonnets, (1896)
- Dalliance, (1897) essays
- Frederic Uvedale: a Romance, (1901)
- Studies in the Lives of the Saints, (1902)
- Italy and the Italians, (1903)
- Perugino, (n.d.) The Popular Library of Art series
- Sigismondo Pandolfo Malatesta, Lord of Rimini: A Study of a XV century Italian Despot, (1906)
  - 2nd ed. revised as The Mastiff of Rimini, (1926)
- Country Walks about Florence, (1908)
- In Unknown Tuscany, (1909)
  - later reprinted as A Wayfarer in Unknown Tuscany, (1925) with notes by William Heywood
- Memoirs of the Dukes of Urbino, (1909) editor - by James Dennistoun
- Giovanni Boccaccio: A Biographical Study, (1910)
- A Book of the Wye, (1911)
- Highways and Byways in Somerset, (1912)
- Ravenna: A Study (Illustrated by Harald Sund), (1913)
- England of My Heart: Spring, (1914) illustrations by Gordon Home
- Attila and the Huns, (1915)
- Highways and Byways in Wiltshire, (1917)
- Some Aspects of the Genius of Boccaccio, (1922) British Academy's Annual Italian Lecture
- The Pageant of Venice, (1922) with 20 colour plates by Frank Brangwyn
- Pietro Aretino: The Scourge of Princes, (1922)
- The Sienese School in the National Gallery, (1925)
- The Story of Ravenna, (1926)
- The Franciscans in England 1224–1538, (1926)
- The Valley of Arno: A Study of its History, Geography and Works of Art, (1927)
- A Glimpse of Greece, (1928)
- Highways and Byways in Gloucestershire, (1932)
- The Life of Christ in the Old Italian Masters, (1935) editor - No. 8 in the "Life and Art in Photographs" series
- Catholicism and English Literature, (1942)
- The Cosmati: The Roman Marble Workers of the XIIth and XIIIth Centuries, (1950)

=== The 'Cities' series ===
- The Cities of Umbria, (1905) with twenty illustrations in colour by A. Pisa
  - Assisi and Umbria Revisited, (1953) 25 B&W illustrations
- The Cities of Spain, (1906)
- Florence and Northern Tuscany with Genoa, (1907) with sixteen illustrations in colour by William Parkinson
  - Florence, (1952) 32 B&W illustrations; re-issued in 1966
- Rome, (1909) with sixteen illustrations in colour by Maxwell Armfield
  - Rome, (1950) 37 B&W illustrations (7th edition revised and enlarged)
- Siena and Southern Tuscany, (1910) with sixteen illustrations in colour by O.F.M. Ward
  - Siena and Southern Tuscany, (1955)
- Venice and Venetia, (1911) with fourteen illustrations in colour by Maxwell Armfield
  - Venice and Venetia, (1954) 33 B&W illustrations
- The Cities of Lombardy, (1912) with twelve illustrations in colour by Maxwell Armfield
  - 2nd ed. revised as Milan and Lombardy, (1925)
- The Cities of Romagna and the Marches, (1913) with twelve illustrations in colour by Frank Crisp
- Naples and Southern Italy, (1915) with twelve illustrations in colour by Frank Crisp
  - Naples and Campania Revisited, (1958) 38 B&W illustrations
- Cities of Sicily, (1926) with twelve illustrations in colour by Harry Morley
