= Alexander Home =

Alexander Home may refer to:

- Sir Alexander Home of that ilk (died 1461)
- Alexander Home, 1st Lord Home (died 1491), Scottish nobleman and soldier, son of Sir Alexander Home of that ilk]
- Alexander Home, 2nd Lord Home (by 1468–1506), Scottish nobleman and soldier, Lord Chamberlain of Scotland, grandson of Alexander Home, 1st Lord Home
- Alexander Home, 3rd Lord Home (died 1516), Scottish soldier and nobleman, Chamberlain of Scotland and March Warden
- Alexander Home, 5th Lord Home (died 1575), Scottish nobleman
- Sir Alexander Home, 1st Baronet (died 1698)
- Alexander Home, 1st Earl of Home (1566–1619), Scottish nobleman
- Alexander Home, 9th Earl of Home (died 1786), Scottish nobleman and clergyman
- Alexander Home, 10th Earl of Home (1769–1841), British politician and nobleman
- Alexander Home, 14th Earl of Home (1903–1995), British politician and Prime Minister

== Similar spelling ==
- Alexander Hume (1558–1609), Scottish poet and Moderator of the General Assembly of the Church of Scotland
