= John Hulme =

John Hulme may refer to:

- John Walter Hulme (1805–1861), British Hong Kong lawyer and judge
- John Hulme (Derbyshire cricketer) (1862–1940), English cricketer who played for Derbyshire 1887–1903
- John Hulme (footballer) (1945–2008), English professional footballer
- John Hulme (Shropshire cricketer) (born 1950), Welsh cricketer who played for Shropshire
- John Hulme (author) (born 1969), American children's writer and film director

== See also ==
- John Hume (disambiguation)
