= William Hume =

William Hume may refer to:

- Bill Hume (footballer) (1937–2005), English-born soccer player who played for New Zealand and Australia
- Bill Hume (cartoonist) (1916–2009), American artist, art director, and newspaper man
- Billy Hume (1935–1990), Scottish footballer
- Willie Hume (1862–1941), cyclist, first ever winner on Dunlop pneumatic tyres
- William Hume (Cape politician) (1837–1916), politician of the Cape Colony
- William Errington Hume (1879–1960), English physician (knighted in 1952)
- William H. Hume, American architect in New York City
- William J. Hume, American heir, businessman and conservative philanthropist
- William Fraser Hume (1867–1949), British geologist

== See also ==
- William Hume-Williams (1863–1947), British politician
- William Hume Blake (1809–1870), Canadian jurist and politician
- William Hume-Rothery (1899–1968), British metallurgist
- William Hulme (disambiguation)
