= John Callander =

18th-century Scottish antiquary

John Callander (1722–1789) of Craigforth in Stirlingshire was a Scottish antiquary and plagiarist.

== Life ==
He was the son of James Callander, and Katherine Mackenzie, daughter of Sir Kenneth Mackenzie of Cromarty. He qualified as an advocate at the Scottish bar, but never obtained a practice.

The preface by James Maidment to Letters from Thomas Percy, D.D., afterwards Bishop of Dromore, John Callander of Craigforth, Esq., and others, to George Paton, which appeared at Edinburgh in 1830, indicates that in his latter years Callandar was reclusive, and a religious melancholic. He died at Craigforth on 14 September 1789.

== Works ==
Callander presented five volumes of manuscripts, Spicilegia Antiquitatis Græcæ, sive ex veteribus Poetis deperdita Fragmenta, to the Society of Scottish Antiquaries in 1781, shortly after he was elected a fellow. He also presented at the same time nine volumes of manuscript annotations on John Milton's Paradise Lost. He had previously published his manuscript annotations to Book I in 1750. In March 1818 an article appeared in Blackwood's Magazine, in which it was shown that many of Callander's manuscript annotations had been borrowed, without acknowledgment, from the annotations of Patrick Hume in the sixth edition of Paradise Lost (published by Jacob Tonson) in 1695. A committee of the Society of Antiquaries of Scotland reported on the manuscript notes, saying that a comparatively small proportion of were from Hume.

Between 1766 and 1768 Callander published in three volumes Terra Australis Cognita, or Voyages to the Southern Hemisphere during the Sixteenth, Seventeenth, and Eighteenth Centuries, partly translated from Charles de Brosses. While this was an influential work for British readers, and timely given the expeditions of James Cook, the content involved adaptation without acknowledgement of the work and maps of de Brosses, and is now considered as plagiarism.

In 1779 Callander published An Essay towards a Literal English Version of the New Testament in the Epistle of Paul directed to the Ephesians, in which he gave a metaphrase in English of the Greek idiom. His edition of Two Ancient Scottish Poems, the Gaberlunzie Man, and Christ's Kirk on the Green, with Notes and Observations, published in Edinburgh in 1782, contained questionable etymological remarks.

Callander proposed other works, including Bibliotheca Septentrionalis, of which he printed a specimen in 1778, and a History of the Ancient Music of Scotland from the age of the venerable Ossian to the beginning of the Sixteenth Century, for which he printed Proposals in 1781.

== Family ==
By his wife, Mary, daughter of Sir James Livingston, he had seventeen children. His eldest son changed his surname, and was known as James Campbell.

== Notes ==
Attribution

This article incorporates text from a publication now in the public domain: Stephen, Leslie, ed. (1886). "Callander, John". Dictionary of National Biography. Vol. 8. London: Smith, Elder & Co.
