= Richard Cattell (surgeon) =

American surgeon

- Born: Richard Barley Channing Cattell; March 21, 1900; Martins Ferry, Ohio, U.S.
- Died: September 18, 1964 (aged 64); U.S.
- Education: Mount Union College; Harvard University (M.D.)

Richard Barley Channing Cattell (1900–1964), was an American biliary duct reconstructive surgeon and past director of the Lahey Clinic, now known as Lahey Hospital & Medical Center. In addition, he was distinguished in surgeries on the gastrointestinal tract, pancreas and thyroid.

He was renowned for operating on patients from all over the world including Sir Anthony Eden.

== Early life ==
Cattell was born 21 March 1900 in Martins Ferry, Ohio, graduated from Mount Union College with an A.B. degree and subsequently moved to Harvard to study medicine. His family were Quakers and he embraced their beliefs, particularly regarding responsibility and patience, when it came to teaching medicine later on. He was inspired to study medicine from the age of 16 years, principally by his surgeon uncle, Dick Brenneman and the early death of his mother, from breast cancer. During World War I, in 1917, Cattell joined the Army Medical Corps.

== Surgical career ==
After training at St Luke’s Hospital in New York and at the Lahey clinic, in 1927 Cattell became part of the clinical staff. The founder of the clinic, Dr Frank Lahey, died in 1953, resulting in Cattell becoming the new director. He held this position until illness caused him to retire in 1962.

He served as Governor and Regent at the American College of Surgeons, a previous president of the Interstate Postgraduate Medical Association and a director of the Massachusetts division of the American Cancer Society.

Cattell was visiting London when Anthony Eden was a matter of surgical decision. A mishap in surgery in 1953 had led to Eden developing surgical complications. Despite Winston Churchill and lord Moran's wishes that reconstructive surgery be performed in London, Horace Evans, 1st Baron Evans managed to persuade further surgery under Cattell in the United States.

== Awards ==
Cattell received an honorary Doctor of Science degree by Boston University. The Buffalo Surgical Society presented him with the Roswell Park Medal and the Harrisburg (Pa.) Surgical Society awarded the George B. Kunkel Surgical Medal.

== Family ==
Cattell was married to Agnes Campbell Matsinger. They had two daughters and three sons. When he died at age 64 years, Cattell also had nine grandchildren.

== Legacy ==
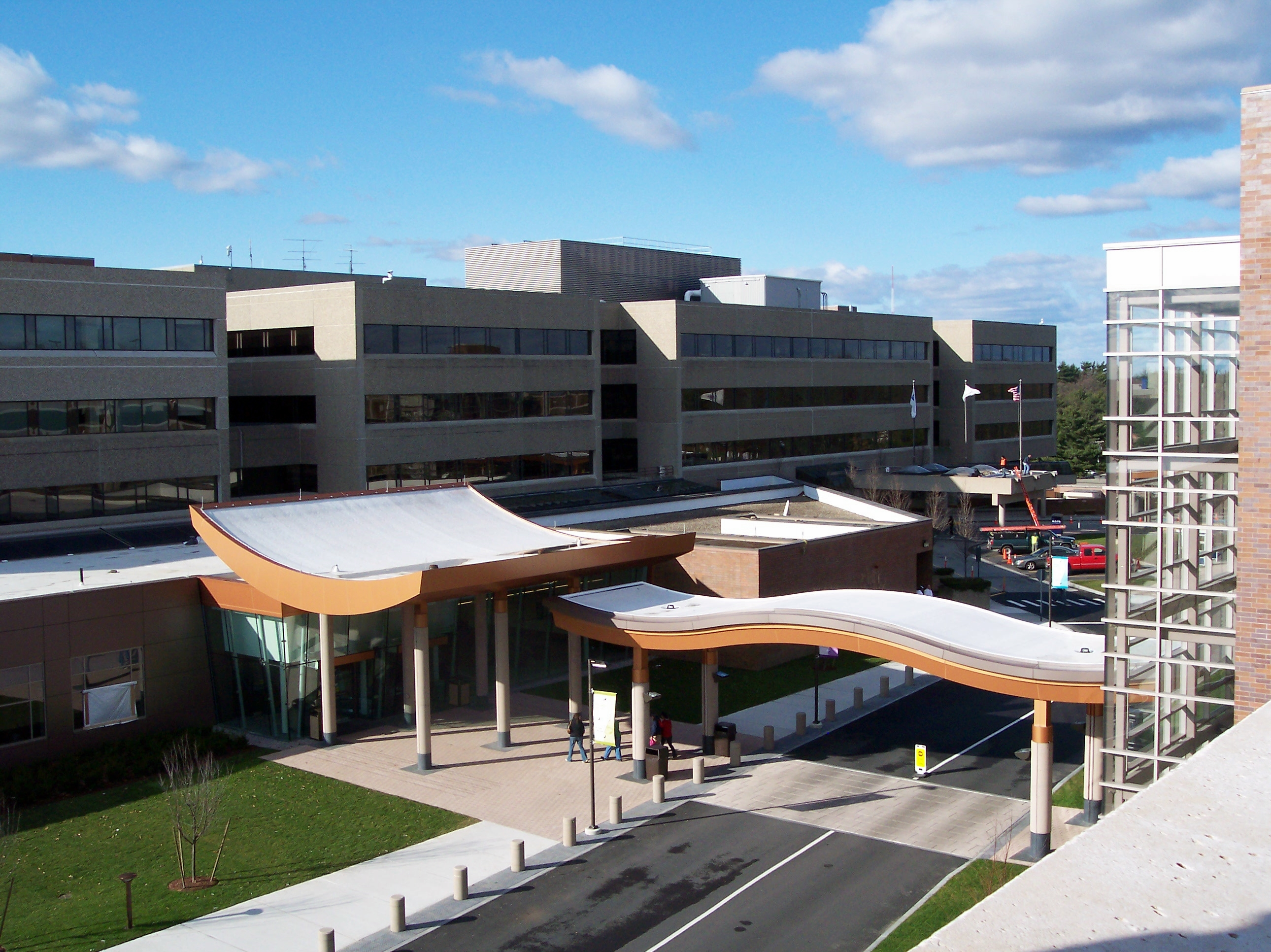
LaheyClinicBurl

Cattell's principal legacy will remain his reputation for operating on the 'complex case'.
