= Sir Alexander Home, 1st Baronet =

Sir Alexander Home of Renton, 1st Baronet (died 28 May 1698) was created a Baronet of Nova Scotia about 1678. He was also knighted sometime before 28 August 1671 when he was described as such in a Laing charter.

The "eldest lawful son" of Sir John Home, of Renton, Lord Renton, by his spouse Margaret, daughter of John Stewart, Commendator of Coldingham Priory, Sir Alexander married (contract dated 27 April 1678) Margaret, daughter of Sir William Scott, Lord Clerkington (d. 1656), a Senator of the College of Justice, by his second wife Barbara (d. 1684), daughter of Sir Alexander Dalmahoy of that Ilk, Knt.

His son and successor in the baronetcy was Sir Alexander Home, 2nd Baronet, of Renton (d. 17 February 1737 at Edinburgh and interred at Coldingham).

Baronetage of Nova Scotia
New creation	Baronet (of Renton) c.1675–1698	Succeeded by Robert Home
