= Home baronets =

Baronets surnamed 'Home'

There have been five baronetcies created for persons with the surname Home (pronounced "Hume"), four in the Baronetage of Nova Scotia and one in the Baronetage of the United Kingdom. Only one creation is extant as of 2025.

The Home Baronetcy, of Wedderburn in the County of Berwick, was created in the Baronetage of Nova Scotia in circa 1638 for David Home. On the death of the second Baronet in circa 1716, the heir was under attainder and the baronetcy consequently forfeited.

The Home Baronetcy, of Blackadder in the County of Berwick, was created in the Baronetage of Nova Scotia on 25 January 1671 for John Home, with remainder to the heirs male of his body. He was a patrilineal descendant of John Home, fourth son of Sir David Home of Wedderburn, who was killed at the Battle of Flodden in 1513. The seventh Baronet was a Vice-Admiral of the Blue. The tenth Baronet assumed in 1878 the additional surname of Speirs. However, none of his successors have borne this surname. The thirteenth Baronet was a claimant to the dormant Earldom of Dunbar.

The Home Baronetcy, of Renton in the County of Berwick, was created in the Baronetage of Nova Scotia sometime between 1672 and 1678 for Alexander Home. He was the son of John Home, Lord Renton, and elder brother of the first Baronet of Lumsden (see below). The title became either extinct or dormant on the death of the fourth Baronet in 1738.

The Home Baronetcy, of Lumsden (Lumsdaine) in the County of Berwick, was created in the Baronetage of Nova Scotia on 31 December 1697 for Patrick Home. He was the son of John Home, Lord Renton, and younger brother of the first Baronet of Renton (see above). The title became extinct on the death of the third Baronet in 1783.

The Home Baronetcy, of Well Manor in the County of Southampton, was created in the Baronetage of the United Kingdom on 2 January 1813 for the physician Everard Home. The title became extinct on the death of the second Baronet in 1853.

== Home baronets, of Wedderburn (c. 1638) ==
- Sir David Home, 1st Baronet (d. 1650)
- Sir George Home, 2nd Baronet (1641 – c. 1716)

== Home, later Home-Speirs, later Home baronets, of Blackadder (1671) ==
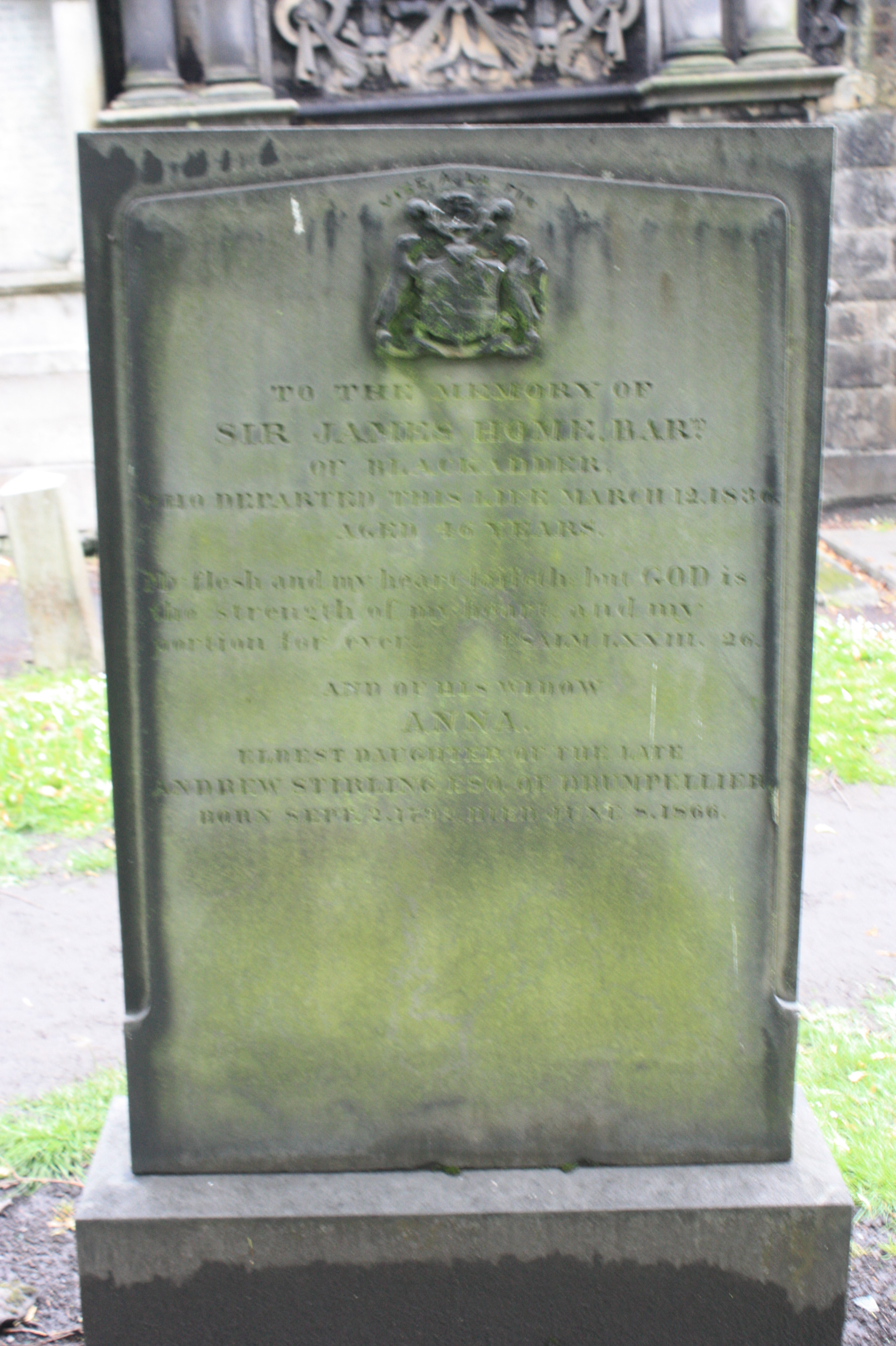
The grave of Sir James Home 1790–1836, Greyfriars Kirkyard

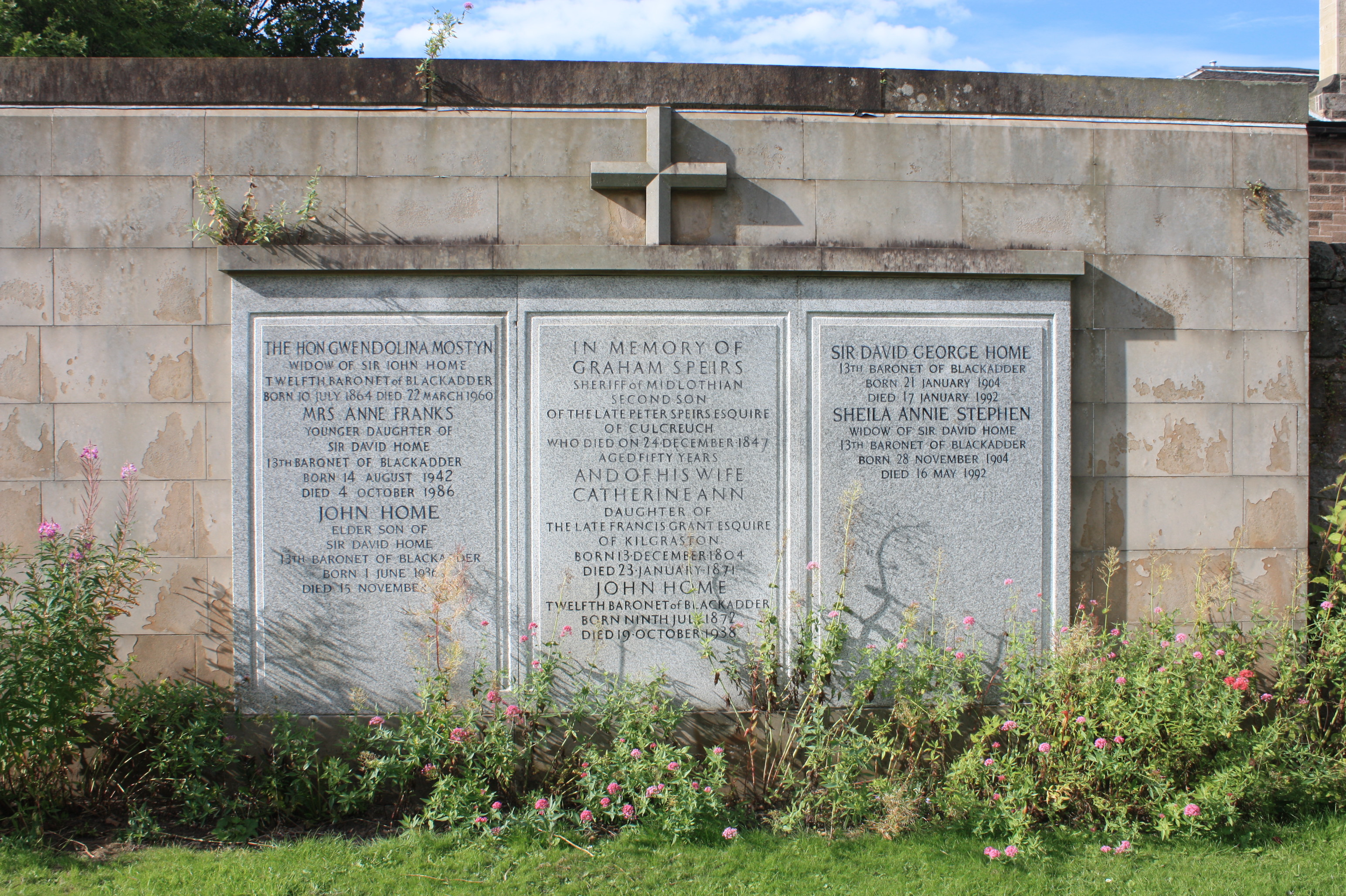
The grave of the Home baronets, Grange Cemetery, Edinburgh

- Sir John Home, 1st Baronet (d. 1675)
- Sir John Home, 2nd Baronet (d. 1706)
- Sir John Home, 3rd Baronet (d. c. 1730)
- Sir William Home, 4th Baronet (d. c. 1735)
- Sir John Home, 5th Baronet (d. 1737)
- Sir James Home, 6th Baronet (d. 1755)
- Sir George Home, 7th Baronet (1740–1803)
- Sir James Home, 8th Baronet (1790–1836)
- Sir John Home, 9th Baronet (1829–1849)
- Sir George Home-Speirs, 10th Baronet (1832–1887)
- Sir James Home-Speirs, 11th Baronet (1861–1931)
- Sir John Home, 12th Baronet (1872–1938)
- Sir David George Home, 13th Baronet (1904–1992)
- Sir William Dundas Home, 14th Baronet (born 19 February 1968), is the grandson of the 13th Baronet. His father, John Home, died of cancer in 1988 and was a political journalist in Australia. His mother, Nancy, is now Lady Gorton, the widow of Sir John Gorton, 19th Prime Minister of Australia. William Home was educated at Cranbrook School, Sydney and is a consultant tree surgeon and horticulturalist. He married Dominique Meryl Fischer, the daughter of Syd Fischer, on 30 September 1995. He and his estranged wife have two children: Thomas John Home of Blackadder (born 24 November 1996) and Petra Sydney Home (born 1998).

== Home baronets, of Renton (between 1672–1678) ==
- Sir Alexander Home, 1st Baronet (d. 1698)
- Sir Robert Home, 2nd Baronet (d. c. 1730)
- Sir Alexander Home, 3rd Baronet (d. 1737)
- Sir John Home, 4th Baronet (d. 1738)

== Home baronets, of Lumsden (1697) ==
- Sir Patrick Home, 1st Baronet (c. 1650 – 1723)
- Sir John Home, 2nd Baronet (d. 1756)
- Sir James Home, 3rd Baronet (d. 1783)

== Home baronets, of Well Manor (1813) ==
- Sir Everard Home, 1st Baronet (1756–1832)
- Sir James Everard Home, 2nd Baronet (1798–1853)

== See also ==
- Clan Home
- Earl of Home
- Hume baronets
