= Ian Hume =

Scottish footballer

Personal information
- Full name: Ian Hume
- Date of birth: 9 October 1948 (age 78)
- Place of birth: Scotland
- Position: Outside forward

Senior career*
Years	Team	Apps	(Gls)
1967–1970	Queen's Park	31	(3)
1970–1972	Ayr United	5	(0)
1972–1973	Stirling Albion	1	(0)
1973	Stenhousemuir	11	(1)

International career
1969–1970	Scotland Amateurs	4	(1)
- * Club domestic league appearances and goals

Ian Hume (born 9 October 1948) is a Scottish former amateur footballer who played as an outside left in the Scottish League for Queen's Park, Stenhousemuir, Ayr United and Stirling Albion. He was capped by Scotland at amateur level.
