= Donald Hume =

Donald Hume may refer to:

- Donald Hume (rower) (1915–2001), American rower in the 1936 Olympics
- Donald Charles Hume (1907–1986), English badminton player
