= The Tale of Ralph the Collier =

The Tale of Ralph the Collier, also known as The Tale of Ralph Collier and The Taill of Rauf Coilȝear, is an Early Scots poem composed in the late fifteenth century. It constituted a revival of Middle English alliterative verse, wherein the first and middle parts of each verse begin with the same sound.

== Synopsis ==
The story concerns King Charlemagne, who has gotten lost and detached from his retinue in a storm. He is forced to take refuge in the home of a collier named "Rauf." While Rauf is more or less hospitable, he does not realize his guest is the king, and so treats him somewhat roughly.

Upon departing the next day, Charlemagne tells Rauf to come to the court in Paris so he can sell his goods at a very lucrative price. When he gets home, the king orders his best knight, Sir Roland, to scan the countryside and tell anyone on the road to come straight to Charlemagne. An encounter between Roland and Rauf ensues, in which Roland to no avail demands that Rauf come with him. Rauf, in spite of Roland's magnificence, defies him, keeping his word to do as his guest asked. Roland finally allows Rauf to go his way, but the two promise each other to meet later to resolve the dispute.

When Rauf finally gets to the court, he is bewildered, never having been to such a place. When Roland tells Charlemagne about his encounter, Charlemagne seeks out Rauf and, to everyone's surprise, makes him a knight, provoking the ridicule of the other knights in the court.

Rauf takes all of this in stride, and goes back to the place he promised to meet Roland. There, he sees a knight on a camel rushing toward him, whom he, somewhat foolishly, takes to be Roland. The two have a fight, during which Rauf gets the upper hand, then realizes this person is a "Saracen" and not Roland. Roland comes at this point. He pleads with the Saracen to renounce his faith and convert to Christianity, or else Roland and Rauf will be forced to kill him. The two discuss back and forth, bringing up issues of worldly gain and faith. Ultimately, the Saracen does as he's asked, and converts.
