= Henry Whitelock Torrens =

English essayist, journalist and scholar (1806–1852)

Henry Whitelock Torrens (20 May 1806 – 16 August 1852), son of Major-General Henry Torrens, was an English essayist, journalist, and scholar, whose scattered papers were collected and published at Calcutta in 1854. Torrens also began the first English-translation of The Arabian Nights' Entertainment from Arabic-language sources, publishing his renditions of the first 50 tales in 1838.

== Life ==
Henry Whitelock Torrens was born on 20 May 1806. He received his B.A. at Christ Church, Oxford (where he was a president of the United Debating Society), and entered the Inner Temple. After a short service under the Foreign Office, he obtained a writership from the Court of Directors of the East India Company and arrived in India in November 1828 and held various appointments at Meerut. In 1835 he joined the Secretariat, in which he served in several departments under Sir William Hay Macnaghten. In 1839 he assisted James Hume in the editing of the Eastern Star, a weekly paper, which became a daily paper called the Calcutta Star. He was secretary (1840–1846) and a Vice-President (1843–1845) to the Asiatic Society of Bengal (now the Asiatic Society). In December 1846, he was appointed Agent to the Governor-General at Murshidabad. Here in his endeavours to improve the Nizamat administration, his relations with the Nawab Nizam and his officials became greatly strained.

Torrens died of dysentery at Calcutta while on a visit to the Governor-General on 16 August 1852 and was buried in the Lower Circular Road Cemetery.
