= Allan Ramsay (poet) =

Scottish poet (1686–1758)

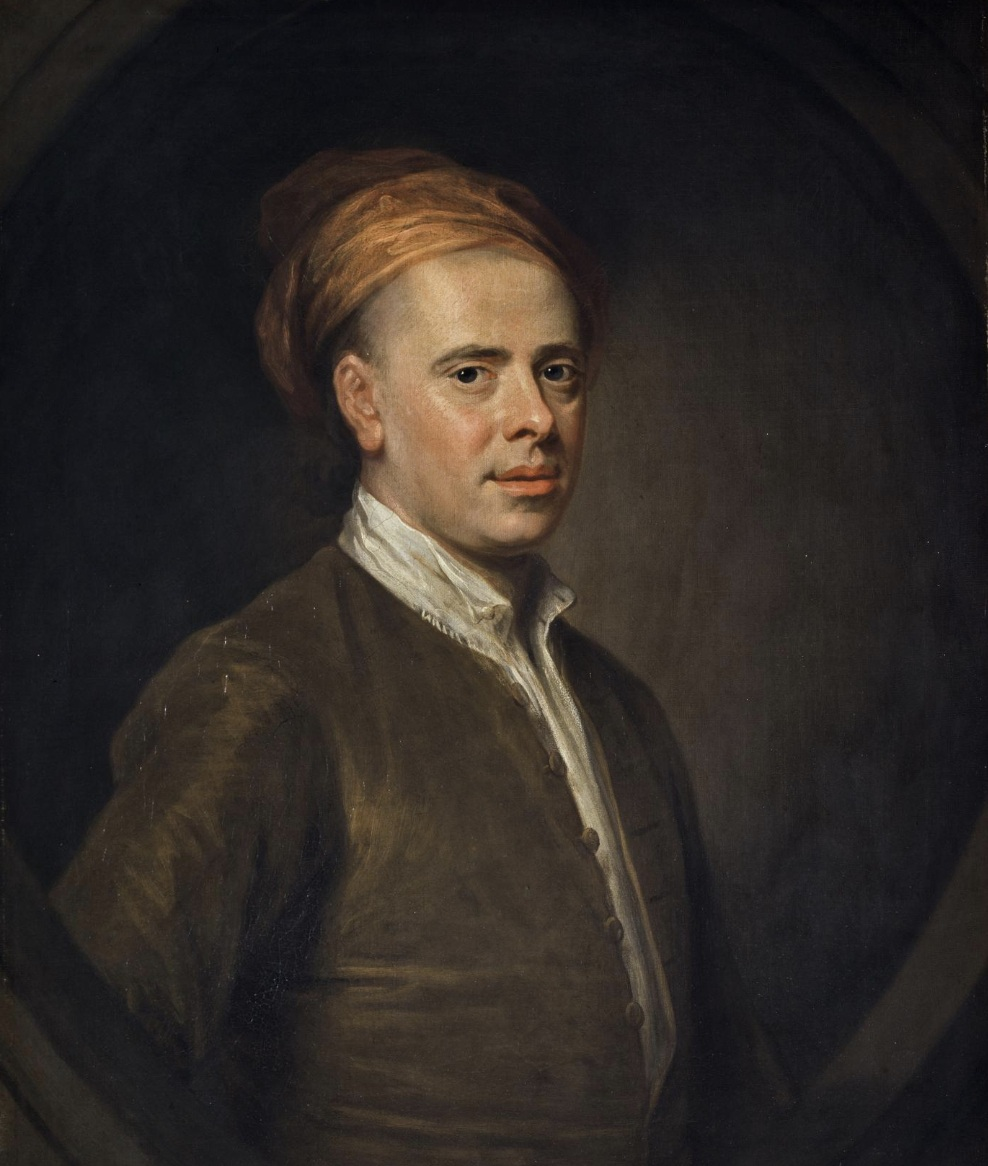
- Portrait by William Aikman, c. 1722
- Born: 15 October 1684; Leadhills, Lanarkshire, Scotland
- Died: 7 January 1758 (aged 71)
- Occupation: poet

Allan Ramsay (c. 15 October 1684 – 7 January 1758) was a Scottish poet (or makar), playwright, publisher, librarian and impresario of early Enlightenment Edinburgh. Ramsay's influence extended to England, foreshadowing the reaction that followed the publication of Percy's Reliques. He was on close terms with Britain's leading men of letters and corresponded with William Hamilton of Bangour, William Somervile, John Gay and Alexander Pope.

He began writing poetry as a member of the Easy Club and in 1715 became Club Laureate. Ramsay published verses and turned bookseller in 1718, selling poetry collections like Wealth and the Woody, a satire on the South Sea Company. In 1720, he collected and published his poems, establishing a circulating library in 1726. Ramsay edited The Tea-Table Miscellany and The Ever Green and is considered as a pastoral writer and editor who revived interest in vernacular literature.

Leigh Hunt sees Allan as a major contributor to the early naturalistic literary reaction of the 18th century. His The Gentle Shepherd, showed an appreciation of country life and anticipates the attitude of Romanticism with a neo-classical tradition. He is viewed as the connecting-link between the greater "Makars" of the 15th and 16th centuries and later Scottish writers like Robert Fergusson and Robert Burns.

== Life and career ==
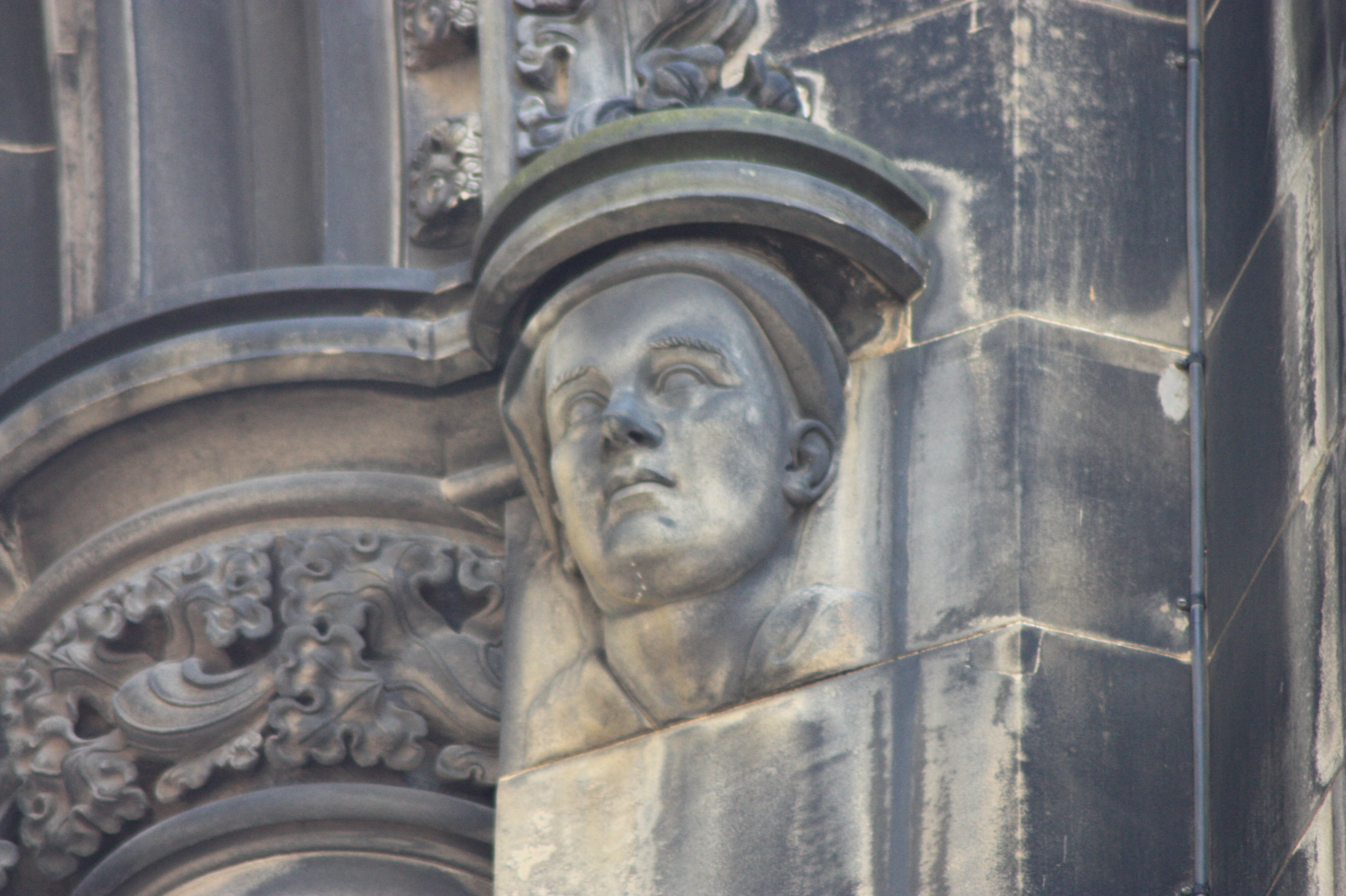
Allan Ramsay as depicted on the Scott Monument

Allan Ramsay was born at Leadhills, Lanarkshire, to Robert Ramsay (1663–1687), Manager of Lord Hopetoun's lead mines at Leadhills, and his wife, Alice Bower, whose father, Alan Bower, was a native of Derbyshire who had come to Leadhills as an instructor to the miners.

Allan Ramsay and his elder brother Robert attended the parish school at Crawfordjohn. In 1701, the year after his mother died, Allan's stepfather apprenticed him to a wig-maker in Edinburgh and received his indentures back by 1709. He married Christian Ross in 1712; a few years after he had established himself as a wig-maker (not as a barber, as has been often said) in the High Street, and soon found himself in comfortable circumstances. They had six children. His eldest child was Allan Ramsay, the portrait painter.

Ramsay's first efforts in verse-making were inspired by the meetings of the Easy Club (founded in 1712) of which he was an original member, and in 1715, he became the Club Laureate. In the society of the members he assumed the name of Isaac Bickerstaff, and later of Gawin Douglas, the latter partly in memory of his maternal grandfather Douglas of Muthill (Perthshire), and partly to give point to his boast that he was a "poet sprung from a Douglas loin". The choice of the two names has some significance, when we consider his later literary life as the associate of the Queen Anne poets and as a collector of old Lowland Scots poetry.

By 1718 he had made some reputation as a writer of occasional verse, which he published in broadsheets, and then (or a year earlier) he turned bookseller in the premises where he had hitherto plied his craft of wig-making. In 1716 he had published a rough transcript of "Christ's Kirk on the Green" from the Bannatyne Manuscript, with some additions of his own. In 1718 he republished the piece with more supplementary verses. In the following year he printed a collection of Scots Songs. His engagement with important issues of the day can be seen in poems such as e Wealth, Or, The Woody, in 1720, a satire on the South Sea Company, describing its fortunes as shifting sands. The success of these ventures prompted him to collect his poems and publish a volume in 1721. The volume was issued by subscription, and brought in the sum of four hundred guineas. Four years later he removed to another shop, in the neighbouring Luckenbooths, where he opened a circulating library and extended his business as a bookseller. Ramsay is considered to have created the first circulating library in Britain when he rented books from his shop in 1726.

Between the publication of the collected edition of his poems and his settling down in the Luckenbooths, he had published a few shorter poems and had issued the first instalments of The Tea-Table Miscellany (1723–37) and The Ever Green (1724). The Tea-Table Miscellany is "A Collection of Choice Songs Scots and English", containing some of Ramsay's own, some by his friends, several well-known ballads and songs, and some Caroline verse. Its title was suggested by the programme of The Spectator: as Addison had sought for his speculations the hour set apart "for tea and bread and butter", so Ramsay laid claim to that place for his songs "e'en while the tea's fill'd reeking round".

In The Ever Green: being a Collection of Scots Poems wrote by the Ingenious before 1600, Ramsay had another purpose, to reawaken an interest in the older national literature. Nearly all the pieces were taken from the Bannatyne manuscript, though they are by no means verbatim copies. They included his version of "Christ's Kirk" and a remarkable pastiche by the editor entitled "The Vision". While engaged on these two series, he produced, in 1725, his dramatic pastoral The Gentle Shepherd. In the volume of poems published in 1721 Ramsay had shown his bent to this genre, especially in "Patie and Roger", which supplies two of the dramatis personae to his greater work. The success of the drama was remarkable. It passed through several editions, and was performed at the theatre in Edinburgh; its title is still known in every corner of Scotland, even if it be no longer read.

In 1726 he published anonymously Poems in English and Latin, on the Archers and Royal Company of Archers, by several Hands for the Royal Company of Archers. He wrote the words to the Archer's March,

Sound, sound the music, sound it,
Let hills and dales rebound it,
Let hills and dales rebound it
In praise of Archery.
Used as a Game it pleases,
The mind to joy it raises,
And throws off all diseases
Of lazy luxury.

Now, now our care beguiling,
When all the year looks smiling,
When all the year looks smiling
With healthful harmony.
The sun in glory glowing,
With morning dew bestowing
Sweet fragrance, life, and growing
To flowers and every tree.

Tis now the archers royal,
An hearty band and loyal,
An hearty band and loyal,
That in just thought agree,
Appear in ancient bravery,
Despising all base knavery,
Which tends to bring in slavery,
Souls worthy to live free.

Sound, sound the music, sound it,
Fill up the glass and round wi't,
Fill up the glass and round wi't,
Health and Prosperity
To our great chief and officers,
To our president and counsellors,
To all who like their brave forbears
Delight in Archery.

Another volume of his poems appeared in 1728. Ramsay wrote little afterwards, though he published a few shorter poems, and new editions of his earlier work. A complete edition of his Poems appeared in London in 1731 and in Dublin in 1733. With a touch of vanity he expressed the fear lest "the coolness of fancy that attends advanced years should make me risk the reputation I had acquired". He was already on terms of intimacy with the leading men of letters in Scotland and England. He corresponded with William Hamilton of Bangour, William Somervile, John Gay and Alexander Pope. Gay probably visited him in Edinburgh, and Pope praised his pastoral, compliments that were undoubtedly responsible for some of Ramsay's unhappy poetic ventures beyond his Scots vernacular. The poet had for many years been a warm supporter of the stage. Some of his prologues and epilogues were written for the London theatres. In 1736 he set about the erection of a new theatre, "at vast expense", in Carrubber's Close, Edinburgh; but the opposition was too strong, and the new house was closed in 1737. In 1755 he retired from his combined house and shop, between Halkerstons Wynd and Carrubbers Close on the Royal Mile, to the house on the slope of the Castle Rock, still known as Ramsay Lodge. This house was called by his friends "the goose-pie" because of its octagonal shape.

He is buried at Greyfriars Kirkyard, Edinburgh. The grave itself is unmarked but a monument was erected to his memory on the south wall of Greyfriars Kirk in the mid-19th century.

== Family ==
His eldest daughter, Christian Ramsay, lived on New Street, off the Canongate. She was an amiable person and also wrote poetry. She never married but lived with many cats. Despite being run over by a hackney coach at the age of 73, which broke her leg, she lived to be 88.

His eldest son, Allan Ramsay was born in Edinburgh, and was a prominent Scottish portrait-painter. From the age of twenty he studied in London under the Swedish painter Hans Hysing, and at the St. Martin's Lane Academy; leaving in 1736 for Rome and Naples, where he worked for three years under Francesco Solimena and Imperiali (Francesco Fernandi).

== Work ==
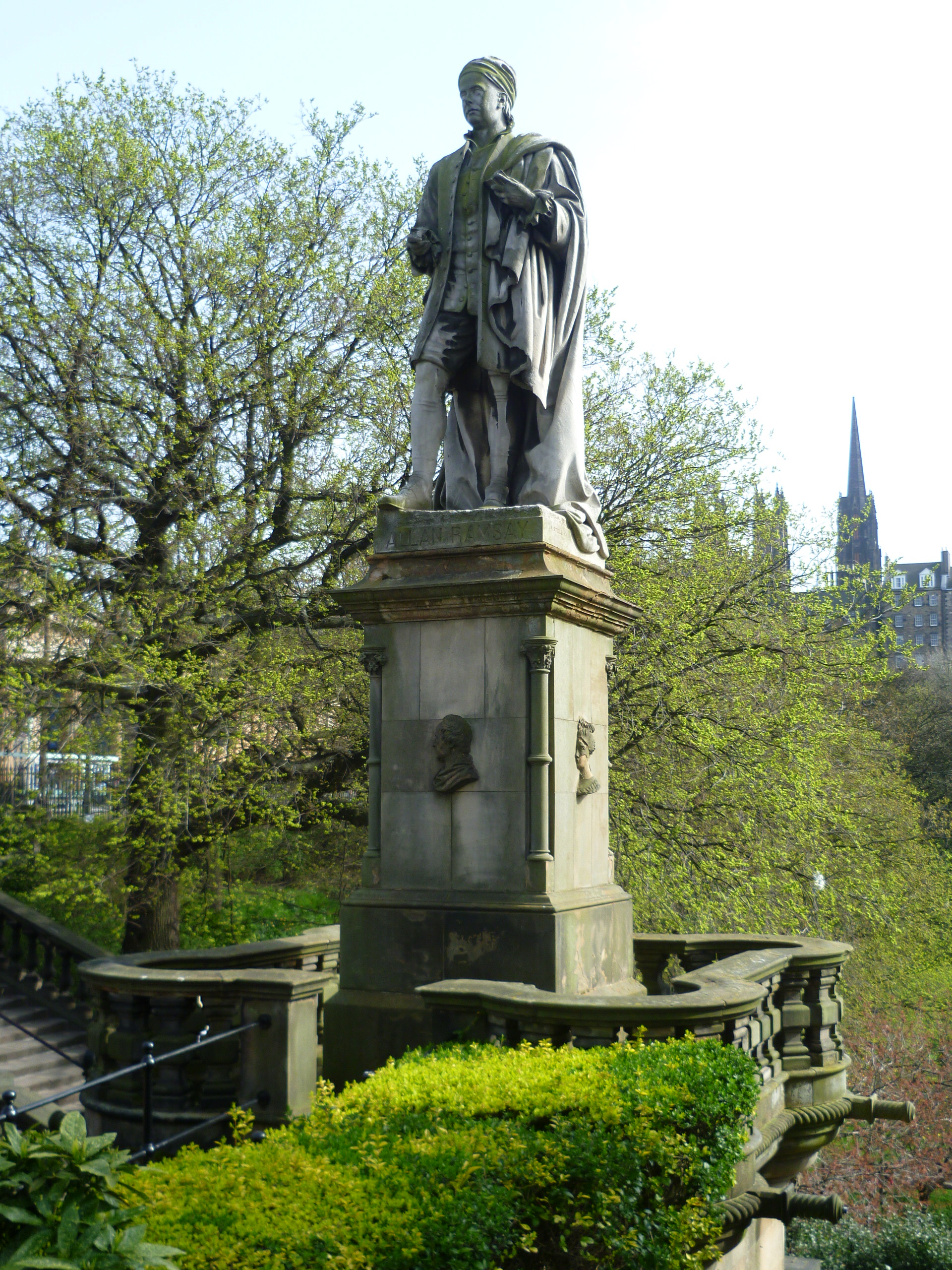
Allan Ramsay Statue, Edinburgh

Ramsay's importance in literary history is twofold. As a pastoral writer ("in some respects the best in the world", according to James Henry Leigh Hunt), he contributed, at an early stage, to the naturalistic reaction of the 18th century. His Gentle Shepherd, by its directness of impression and its appreciation of country life, anticipates the attitude of Romanticism, the school which broke with neo-classical tradition. It has the "mixed" faults which make the greater poem of his Scots successor, Thomson, a "transitional" document, but these give it an historical, if not an individual, interest. His chief place is, however, as an editor. He is the connecting-link between the greater "Makars" of the 15th and 16th centuries, and Robert Fergusson and Robert Burns. Ramsay also knew the Scottish bookseller Andrew Millar since the latter's arrival in Edinburgh in 1720 as the thirteen-year-old apprentice of Ramsay's friend James McEuen. From 1713 Ramsay ran a wigmaker's and printseller's shop in Niddrie's Wynd, close to McEuen's High Street premises. He joined the bookselling trade in 1720, and in 1722 relocated to the east side of the Luckenbooths, next to McEuen and facing the Market Cross. He also owned a shop directly opposite McEuen, on the south side of the Cross. McEuen was the first to advertise copies of Ramsay's Poems (1723), in Glasgow.

Ramsay revived the interest in vernacular literature, and directly inspired the genius of his greater successors. The preface to his Ever Green is a protest against "imported trimming" and "foreign embroidery in our writings" and a plea for a return to simple Scottish tradition. He had no scholarly interest in the past, and he never hesitated to transform the texts when he could give contemporary "point" to a poem; but his instinct was good, and he did much to stimulate an ignorant public to fresh enjoyment. In this respect, too, he anticipates the reaction in England which followed securely on the publication of Percy's Reliques.

The Tea-Table Miscellany was reprinted in 1871 (2 vols., Glasgow; John Crum); The Ever Green in 1875 (2 vols., Glasgow; Robert Forrester); The Poems of Allan Ramsay in 1877 (2 vols., Paisley; Alex. Gardner). These volumes are uniform in size and binding, though issued by different publishers. A selection of the Poems appeared in 1887 (1 vol. 16mo, London; Walter Scott). This volume includes a biographical sketch written by J. Logie Robertson.

There are many popular reprints of his most popular work, The Gentle Shepherd, which is set in Carlops and nearby Newhall Estate. Bradshaws Handbook incorrectly states the location as Currie. Since 2015, a Collected Works of Allan Ramsay (general editor Murray Pittock) has been in preparation from Edinburgh University Press. The first volume, The Gentle Shepherd, was published in 2022. The following five volumes were published by March 2024: Poems of Allan Ramsay (volumes II and III), The Tea-Table Miscellany, The Prose of Allan Ramsay, and The Ever Green.

== Memorials ==
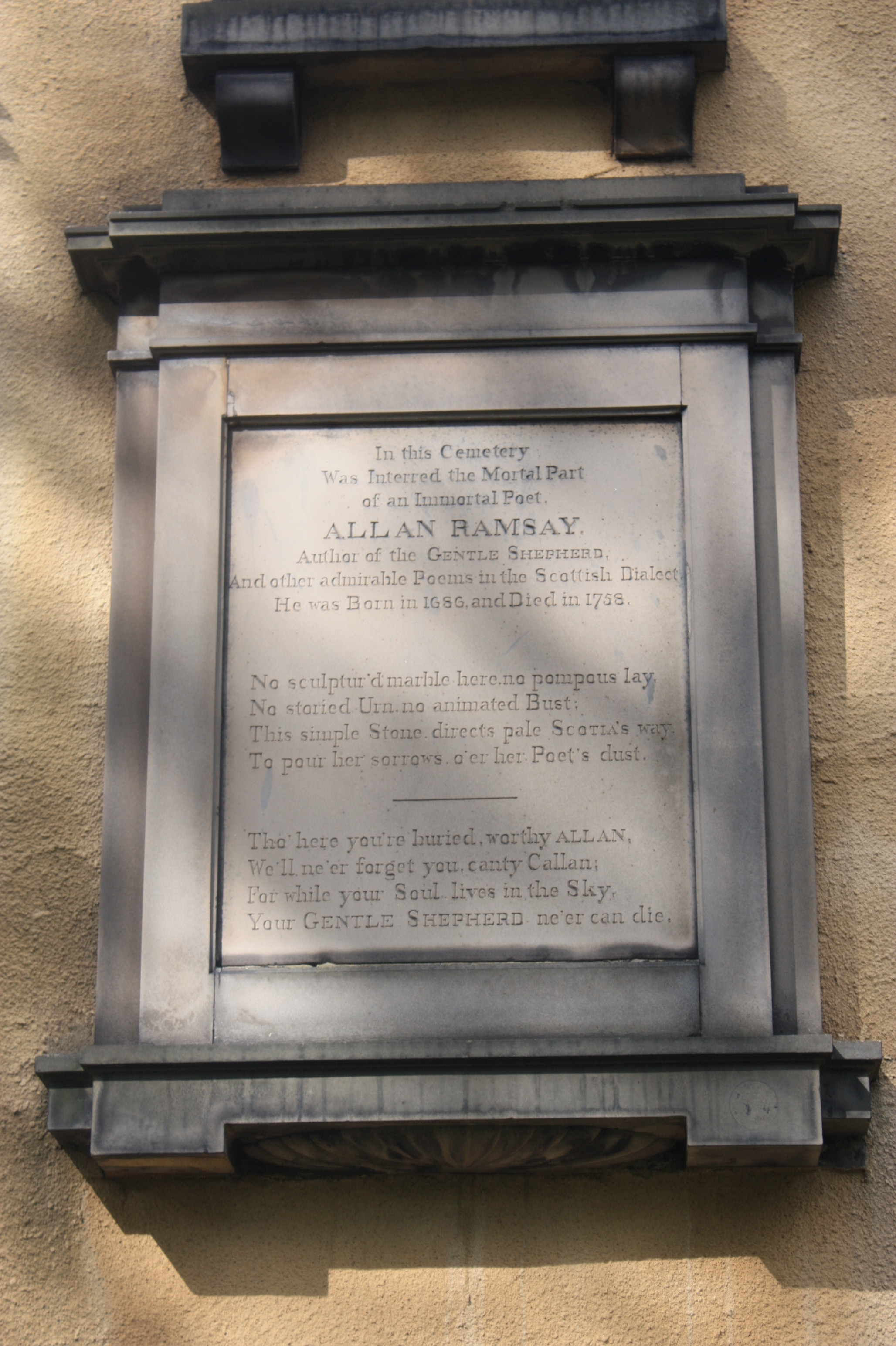
Monument to Allan Ramsay on the south side of Greyfriars Kirk

In 1846 Ramsay was depicted as one of sixteen Scottish poets and writers on the lower section of the Scott Monument on Princes Street in Edinburgh.

Ramsay's statue was erected in 1850 at the corner of Princes Street Gardens and The Mound in the centre of Edinburgh.

There is a hotel located in Carlops named after him. The hotel hosted a festival in his and his son's honour in 2016 on the 330th anniversary of the poet's birth. Further festivals have been held there on Ramsay's birthday from 2017.

A bust of Ramsay is in the Hall of Heroes of the National Wallace Monument in Stirling.

The Ramsay Obelisk at Ravensneuk on the Penicuik Estate was built in 1759 by Ramsay's friend, Sir James Clerk.

== Bibliography ==
- Poems. Edinburgh, 1720 (Google)--N. B. Ramsay's authorizing of this edition is disputed.
- Wealth, Or, the Woody. A Poem on the South Sea. Wrote June 1720, 1720.
- The Tea-Table Miscellany. Edinburgh 1723, 128 pages (Google)
  - The Tea-Table Miscellany. A Collection of Choice Songs, Scots and English. 18th ed., Glasgow, 1782 (Google)
- The Ever Green, 1724
- The Gentle Shepherd, 1725; 1729
- Poems on Several Occasions, 1776 (posthumous)
- The Poems of Allan Ramsay, with an Account of His Life and Writings etc., 1797; reprinted 1877
