= Rowena Hume =

Canadian obstetrician

Rowena Grace Douglas Hume
- Born: January 14, 1877; Galt, Ontario, Canada
- Died: October 2, 1966 (aged 89)
- Education: Ontario Women's Medical College (OWMC) and Trinity College (1899)
- Occupations: Obstetrician, physician
- Years active: 1899–1966
- Employer(s): Ontario Medical College for Women (OMCW), Women's College Hospital (WCH), Queen Charlotte Hospital

Rowena Grace Douglas Hume (January 14, 1877 – October 2, 1966) was a Canadian obstetrician and one of the founders of Toronto's Women's College Hospital. She was also the first Chief of Obstetrics at the hospital from 1911 to 1926.

== Early life and education ==
Hume was born in Galt, Ontario, in 1877. While she was in her 20s, she enrolled in the Ontario Medical College for Women and concluded her studies in 1899 when she obtained an M.D. from Trinity College. After obtaining her M.D., she travelled to Chicago for postgraduate studies at the Women's Hospital and then to the Queen Charlotte Hospital in England for further postgraduate studies. Finally, she joined the staff of her alma mater, the Ontario Medical College for Women.

== Career ==
In 1903 she joined the staff of the Ontario Medical College for Women as a Laboratory Assistant in Pathology and Bacteriology and an Assistant in Anatomy. She also worked at the college's Women's Dispensary. In 1911, Hume was a part of the founding committee of Women's College Hospital. Shortly after, she was appointed as the hospital's first Chief of Obstetrics, a role she held until 1926. Hume then opened her own private practice, which she maintained until she died in 1966.

In addition to her work in obstetrics, Hume was also passionate about birth control programs. According to an article in The Globe and Mail, in 1930 she volunteered at the Hamilton Planned Parenthood Society once a week because they could not find any doctors willing to volunteer.

== Personal life ==
According to her obituary, Hume attended Saint Luke's United Church. She was also a member of the University Women's Club and volunteered at the Fred Victor Mission, Alcoholics Anonymous and the Salvation Army's Harbour Light Centre.

== Death ==
Hume died on October 2, 1966, when she was murdered. At the time she was retired, but was the oldest female doctor in Canada. One of the Metropolitan Toronto Police detectives investigating the crime, James Read, had been delivered by Hume at Women's College Hospital in 1922. Donald Cooke, a handyman working in her home, was arrested, convicted of the murder, and sentenced to life imprisonment.

== Awards, recognitions and memberships ==
In 1907 Hume joined the Academy of Medicine as a Resident Fellow, later becoming a Life Fellow (1950). In addition to her thriving career in obstetrics, she was also a member of several associations, including: The Women's Medical Alumnae Association of the University of Toronto, and the Federation of Canadian Women, where, in 1930, she became the Vice-President.
