= Fred Hume (rugby league) =

Australian rugby league footballer

Personal information
- Full name: Frederick Roy Hume
- Born: 14 December 1898 Sydney, New South Wales, Australia
- Died: 1 February 1978 (aged 79) Sydney, New South Wales, Australia

Playing information
- Position: Centre, Fullback
Club
Years	Team	Pld	T	G	FG	P
1920–22	Eastern Suburbs	19	2	0	0	6
1923–26	St. George	39	5	0	0	15
	Total	58	7	0	0	21
Representative
Years	Team	Pld	T	G	FG	P
1921	New South Wales	1	1	0	0	3

Fred Hume (1898–1978) was an Australian professional rugby league footballer who played in the 1920s. He played for Eastern Suburbs and St. George in the New South Wales Rugby League (NSWRL) competition.

== Career ==
A centre, Hume played 18 matches for Eastern Suburbs club in the years (1920–22) before joining the St. George club the following season. Hume played for St George between 1923 and 1926.

In 1921 Hume represented New South Wales in an interstate match against Queensland.
