= Abraham Hume (cricketer) =

English clergyman and cricketer

Abraham Hume (28 June 1819 – 1 July 1888) was an English clergyman and cricketer who played first-class cricket for Cambridge University and the Marylebone Cricket Club. He was born at Willingale, Essex, and died at Wortham, Suffolk.

Hume played in eight first-class games for Cambridge University between 1839 and 1844 and four matches for MCC between 1840 and 1842; his Cambridge career included the 1841 and 1842 University Matches against Oxford University. While full scorecards are not available for most of his games, he does not appear to have bowled in major matches, nor to have kept wicket, and his batting, in 21 innings across the 12 games from a variety of positions in the batting order, yielded only 64 runs at an average of 3.36 runs per innings and with a highest score of just 16.

== Career outside cricket ==
Hume was educated at Eton College and at King's College, Cambridge, where he was a Fellow from 1841 to 1877. He was ordained as a priest in the Church of England and was priest in charge of Kersey, Suffolk from 1846 to 1877 and rector of Wortham from 1877 to his death in 1888.
