= John Hume (priest) =

John Hume (1743–1818) was a Dean of the Church of Ireland.

He was born in Oxford and educated at Christ Church, Oxford, getting a BA in 1765 and a MA in 1769. He held livings at Gillingham, Dorset and West Lavington, Wiltshire. He was Dean of Derry from 1783 until his death.

Church of Ireland titles
Preceded by Edward Emily	Dean of Derry; 1783–1818	Succeeded by James Saurin
