= Gordon Home =

English artist (1878–1969)

Gordon Cochrane Home (25 July 1878 – 13 December 1969) was an English landscape artist, writer, and illustrator.

Home was born in London. He worked as an art editor at "The Tatler", "The King" and later at the publishers A & C Black. He served as a Major in the Royal Army Service Corps from 1914 to 1920 in France and North Africa, and later travelled widely in North Africa, the British Empire and the Commonwealth.

Home worked mainly in watercolour and pen and ink and frequently exhibited at the Royal Academy. He exhibited at the first annual exhibition of the Society of Graphic Art in 1921. Home wrote and illustrated many travel and history books for A & C Black, J M Dent and other publishers.

== Bibliography ==
- Yorkshire; coast and moorland scenes (A & C Black, 1904).
- The evolution of an English town (J. M. Dent & co., 1905)
- Normandy: The Scenery & Romance of Its Ancient Towns (J M Dent & Co., 1905)
- Yorkshire dales and fells (A & C Black, 1906).
- Headlam, Cecil. Venetia and northern Italy (J M Dent, 1908).
- Yorkshire vales and wolds (A & C Black, 1908).
- Yorkshire Painted and Described (A & C Black, 1908).
- Headlam, Cecil. Inns of Court (A & C Black, 1909)
- The motor routes of France (A & C Black, 1910)
- Home, Gordon & Matthison, William (illustrator). Cambridge (A & C Black, 1911).
- Canterbury (A & C Black, 1911).
- The English Lakes (A & C Black, 1911).
- Stratford-on-Avon, a sketch-book (A & C Black, 1913).
- Winchester, a sketch-book (A & C Black, 1914).
- Foord, E. & Home, Gordon. The invasions of England (A & C Black, 1915).
- France (A & C Black, 1918).
- Through Yorkshire The County Of Broad Acres (J M Dent, 1922).
- York, a sketch book (A & C Black, 1922).
- Roman York (London: Ernest Benn, 1924)
- Through the Borders to the Heart of Scotland (J.M. Dent, London, 1924).
- Monographic Series : Cathedrals, Abbeys & Famous Churches (J M Dent, circa 1925.)
- Home, Gordon & Foord, Edward. Bristol Bath And Malmesbury (J M Dent, In the Series, 1925)
- Home, Gordon & Foord, Edward. Wells, Glastonbury & Cleeve (J. M. Dent, in the series. 1925).
- Hereford & Tintern Including Newport Cathedral & Llanthony Priory (J M Dent, in the Series, 1925.)
- Through East Anglia (J M Dent, 1925)
- Through the Chilterns to the Fens (J M Dent, 1925)
- Baikie, James. The Charm of the Scott Country (A & C Black, 1927)
- Medieval London (London: Ernest Benn, 1927)
- Roman Britain (London: Ernest Benn, 1927)
- A History of London (London: Ernest Benn, 1929)
- Old London Bridge (John Lane, 1931)
- York Minster (J M Dent, 1936).
