= Sir John Hume, 2nd Baronet =

Irish landowner and baronet

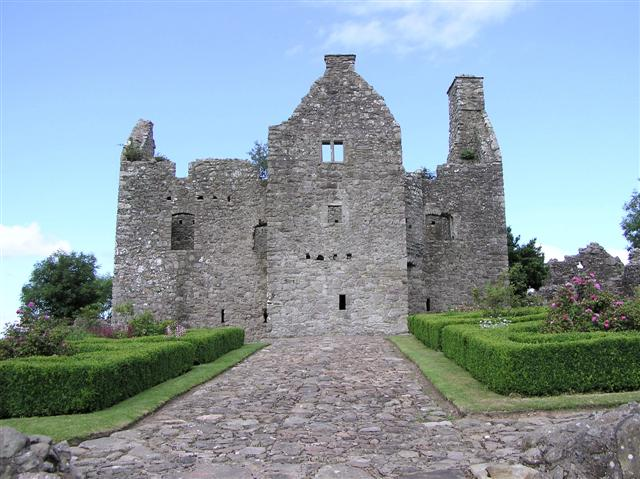
Tully Castle (Castle Hume), Co Fermanagh

Sir John Hume, 2nd Baronet, (died 1695), of Castle Hume (previously Tully Castle), was an Irish landowner and baronet in the Baronetage of Nova Scotia.

He was the eldest son of Sir George Hume, 1st Baronet of Castle Hume and the grandson of John Hume of North Berwick, Scotland.

He was High Sheriff of Fermanagh in 1662 and Governor of Fermanagh c.1689. As a supporter of William of Orange he was attainted in the Patriot parliament of 1689.

He married Sydney, daughter and coheiress of James Hamilton of Manor Hamilton, Leitrim. They had 4 sons and 6 daughters. He was succeeded as 3rd Baronet by his son Gustavus, both his elder sons, John and James, having died in the Williamite Wars.

Baronetage of Nova Scotia
Preceded by George Hume	Baronet (of North Berwick) ?-1695	Succeeded by Gustavus Hume
