= James Hume (magistrate) =

British magistrate and civil servant (1808–1862)

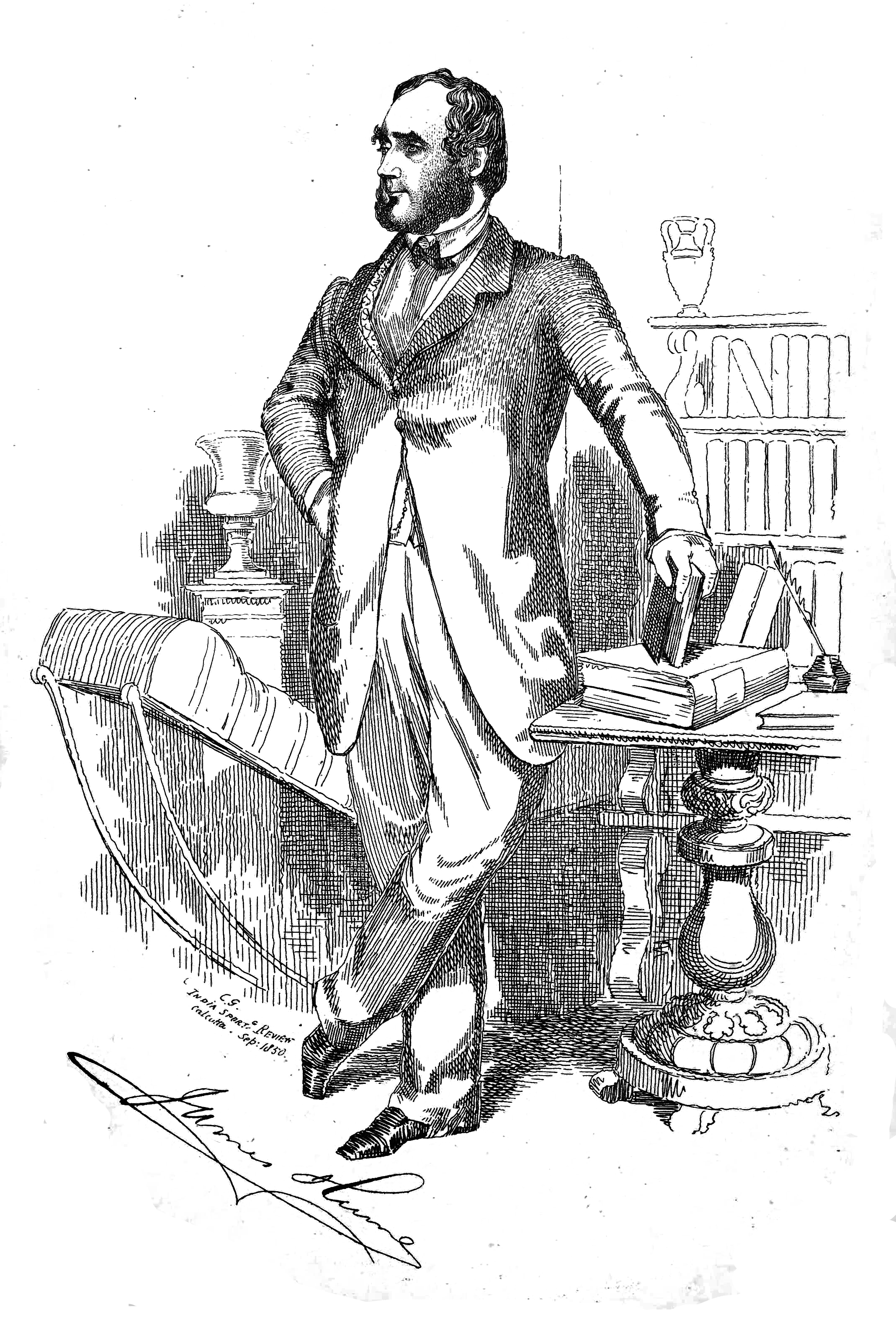
Sketch by Colesworthey Grant, 1850

James Hume (23 January 1808 – 17 September 1862) was a British magistrate and civil servant who worked in the East India Company court at Calcutta. He was a prominent political commentator, the founder of the daily newspaper Calcutta Star which he edited, as also the periodical the India Sporting Review which ran from 1845 to 1859.

== Life and work ==
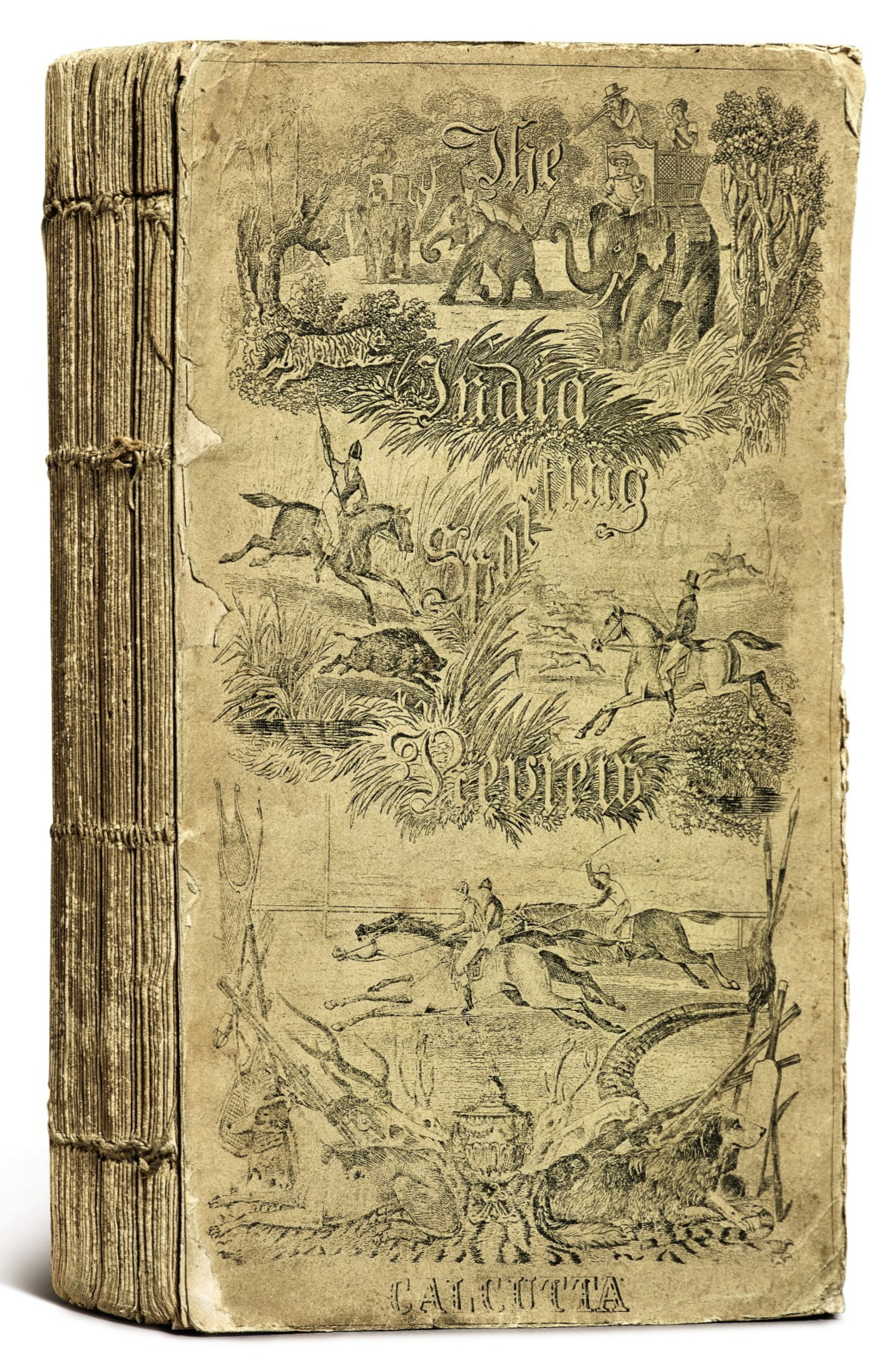
Cover of The India Sporting Review

Hume was born in Montrose, Angus, the third of six children of namesake father James Hume (1779-1813, brother of Joseph Hume) and Marianne Grant (1777-1854). He studied law at the Inner Temple and was called to the bar on 27 January 1832. Arriving in Calcutta on 29 April 1839, he became involved in judicial work. He was an advocate at the Supreme Court at Calcutta from 15 June 1839 and wrote extensively in the newspapers before starting a weekly newspaper The Eastern Star, first published on 5 January 1840. In 1841 he took over the Daily Calcutta Intelligencer and Commercial Advertiser and renamed it as the Calcutta Star, a daily newspaper meant for the British citizens of Calcutta. Hume later became the Police Magistrate of Calcutta and served as Justice of the Peace. He served as an editor of the India Sporting Review between 1845 and 1859 (formerly called the Bengal Sporting Magazine) of which he was also the proprietor. Hume wrote numerous essays under the pen-names of "Idler" in the Calcutta Star and "Abel East" in the India Sporting Review. He also served as an honorary secretary for the Asiatic Society and of the Agri-Horticultural Society of India. He was also a director of the Inland Steam Navigation Company. Hume saw the value of archives, and established a general record office at Fort William. In 1849 he hosted his cousin Allan Octavian Hume on arrival at Calcutta. It was around the same time that there was a British outcry against proposed reforms that made British and Indian citizens common before the law. James Hume was among the few British people in favour of this reform. The Indian Sporting Review terminated with the 1857 uprising. Hume clashed with other political commentators of his time, notably William Thackeray. Hume wrote in 1843 that "Whiggism has become so contemptible, that Radicalism is the only refuge for a reasonable man. Chartism and its five points must stand over for the present, and it will be a long future before the five are carried." He was a keen proponent of trade, noting with positivity, the value of opium trade for England and the losses in payments to middle-men in the movement of indentured Indian labour into Mauritius. He resigned as editor of the Calcutta Star on 29 April 1846.

Hume took a keen interest in theatre, acting in shows at the Chowringhee Theatre, and was involved in literary activities. He married Martha Weatherhed and they had five children of whom James Torrens Hume (1847 - 1930) was later a public prosecutor at Calcutta. His middle name was from his godfather Henry Whitelock Torrens. Hume published a biographical note on Torrens in 1854 and also published a collection of "Letters to friends at home from June 1842, to May 1843". Hume died aboard the S.S. Candia off Galle on 17 September 1862 and is buried in the All Saints' Cemetery, Galle.
