= David Hume (footballer) =

Australian rules footballer

Personal information
- Full name: David George Hume
- Born: 27 May 1898; South Melbourne, Victoria
- Died: 25 June 1964 (aged 66); South Melbourne, Victoria

Playing career^{1}
Years	Club	Games (Goals)
1925	South Melbourne	1 (1)
- ^{1} Playing statistics correct to the end of 1925.

David George Hume (27 May 1898 – 25 June 1964) was an Australian rules footballer who played with South Melbourne in the Victorian Football League (VFL).
