= Fred Hume (American football) =

American football quarterback

Profile
- Position: Quarterback

Personal information
- Listed weight: 122 lb (55 kg)

Career information
- College: Vanderbilt (1901)

Fred Hume was a college football player. A quarterback for the Vanderbilt Commodores, he weighed just 122 pounds. After college, he worked for the International Shoe Company in St. Louis.
