= Patrick Hume (editor) =

Patrick Hume (fl. 1695) was a Scottish schoolmaster in London, author of the first commentary on the Paradise Lost of John Milton.

== Career ==
In 1695, he edited for Jacob Tonson the sixth edition of Milton's Paradise Lost with elaborate notes. This is said to have been the first to attempt exhaustive annotations on the works of an English poet. On the title-page he calls himself P. H. φιλοποιητῆς. Thomas Newton, in his preface to the edition of Paradise Lost published in 1749, says: ‘Patrick Hume, as he was the first, so is the most copious annotator. He laid the foundation, but he laid it among infinite heaps of rubbish.’ Thomas Warton, however, called Hume's work ‘a large and very learned commentary’. John Callander, who edited the first book of Paradise Lost in 1750, plagiarised Hume's notes.

== Family ==
He is said to have been a member of the family of Hume of Polwarth, Berwickshire.
