= John Basil Hume =

British surgeon and lecturer (1893–1974)

- Born: 29 September 1893; Whitby
- Died: 2 March 1974 (aged 80)
- Occupation: General surgeon
- Known for: Anatomy Surgical recommendation of Anthony Eden

John Basil Hume (1893-1974) was a British surgeon and lecturer in anatomy, who trained and mainly worked at St Bartholomew's Hospital, London. As well being an examiner in anatomy for the Royal College of Surgeons and a Hunterian Professor, lecturing in particularly diaphragmatic hernia, he is most commonly remembered for performing Anthony Eden's bile duct operation in 1953.

== Early life ==
John Basil Hume was born on 29 September 1893 in Whitby and went to Bootham school in York.

He qualified in medicine from St Bartholomew's Hospital in 1911, following which, in 1916, he passed the Conjoint Diploma.

Following his first house post in 1916, Hume was posted to East Africa with the Royal Army Medical Corps (RAMC). He achieved rank of major and remained in East Africa until the end of the war.

== Surgical career ==
In 1919 Hume returned to St Bartholomew's to demonstrate anatomy, which he continued until 1923. In 1920, he passed his MBBS with honours and a distinction in medicine from London and acquired the FRCS. He had numerous awards to his name, including the Brackenbury Scholarship, the Kirkes Gold Medal, and the Luther Holden Scholarship.

From 1923 to 1926, Hume was appointed chief assistant to Sir Holburt Waring, a period during which he spent some months also gaining experience in general surgery and urology with surgeons Hugh Cabot and Frederick Amasa Coller at Ann Arbor, Michigan.

After spending his first two consultant years at St Andrew's Hospital, Dollis Hill, he moved to Finchley Memorial Hospital in 1927 as an appointed surgeon. He completed two years as the museum's curator and an extra year as an anatomy lecturer at St Bartholomew's. He also became an examiner in anatomy for the Royal College of Surgeons and lectured on the anatomy of the diaphragm and diaphragmatic hernia as a Hunterian Professor. Waring retired in 1931, leaving Hume to take up an assistant surgeon post, followed by full surgeon in 1946. He remained in this post until retirement in 1958, after which he continued to lecture in anatomy until 1967. In addition, he held surgical posts at University of London, with duties on the Senate, chairman of the external council and deputy Vice-Chancellor.

Hume was one of the three surgeons recommended to perform the biliary tract surgery on foreign secretary Anthony Eden on 12 April 1953. Hume was 60 years old and trusted by Eden in light of a previous appendectomy Hume performed on him many years before. However, Churchill's constant reminders to Hume on how eminent the patient was, contributed to his [Hume's] agitation, requiring an hour to calm down and resume poise prior to carrying out the surgical procedure. What happened in the operation at the London Clinic has been debated and it is likely that his nervousness caused the knife to slip and cut the common bile duct. Later, Eden went to Boston to have corrective surgery performed by Richard Cattell.

== Personal and family ==
Hume married Marjorie Poole in 1925 and lived in Hampstead with their four daughters.

He was a keen fly fisherman and enjoyed travel. Following a long illness, he died on 2 March 1974 at the age of 80.
