= James Hume (cricketer) =

Scottish-born New Zealand cricketer

James Edward Hume (1858 – 1 June 1909) was a Scottish-born cricketer. He played a single first-class match in New Zealand for Otago during the 1880–81 season.

Hume was born at Glasgow in Scotland and moved to New Zealand in his youth. He was educated at Otago Boys' High School in Dunedin and later worked as a surveyor.

Hume played in an Otago team of 22 against the touring Australians in January 1881 and the following month made his only first-class appearance. Playing against Canterbury he scored a single run in each innings and took two wickets, opening the bowling for the team. He died in 1909 in Malaysia.
