= George Hume (cricketer) =

English cricketer and priest

Personal information
- Full name: George Shuldham Hume
- Born: 4 March 1800; Broad Hinton, Wiltshire
- Died: 25 November 1872 (aged 72); Clifton, Bristol

Domestic team information
- Years: Team
- 1821: Cambridge University
- Source: CricketArchive, 31 March 2013

George Shuldham Hume (4 March 1800 – 25 November 1872) was an English cricketer who played for Cambridge University in two matches in 1821, totalling 165 runs with a highest score of 97 not out.

Hume was educated at Eton College and King's College, Cambridge. After graduating he became a Church of England priest and was vicar of Melksham (with Seend, Erlestoke and Shaw) from 1825 until his death.

== Bibliography ==
- Haygarth, Arthur (1862). Scores & Biographies, Volume 1 (1744–1826). Lillywhite.
