= Ernest Hume =

Australian cricketer

Personal information
- Full name: Andrew Ernest Hume
- Born: 5 February 1869; Sydney, Australia
- Died: 22 June 1912 (aged 43); London, England
- Source: ESPNcricinfo, 1 January 2017

Ernest Hume (5 February 1869 – 22 June 1912) was an Australian cricketer. He played five first-class matches for New South Wales in 1895/96.

== See also ==
- List of New South Wales representative cricketers
