= Sir George Hume, 1st Baronet =

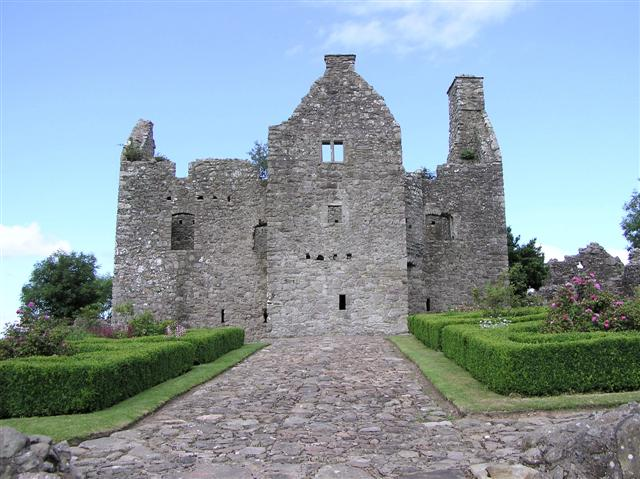
Tully Castle (Castle Hume), Co Fermanagh

Sir George Hume, 1st Baronet (fl. 1671), of Castle Hume, Fermanagh, was a landowner and baronet of Scottish descent.

He was the elder son of Sir John Hume of North Berwick, Scotland and the grandson of Patrick Hume of Polwarth, Scotland. He succeeded to a large estate in Fermanagh granted to his father by the king and was created a baronet, of North Berwick in the Baronetage of Nova Scotia, in about 1638. He also inherited Tully Castle (also known as Castle Hume), built by his father.

He died in Edinburgh and was succeeded by his son Sir John Hume, 2nd Baronet.

Baronetage of Nova Scotia
New creation	Baronet (of North Berwick) c.1638-?	Succeeded by John Hume
