= Hume baronets =

Set index for Hume baronets

There have been three baronetcies created for persons with the surname Hume, two in the Baronetage of Nova Scotia and one in the Baronetage of Great Britain. All are extinct.

- Hume baronets of Polwarth (1637): see Lord Polwarth
- Hume baronets of North Berwick (c.1638)
- Hume baronets of Wormleybury (1769)
