= John Home, Lord Renton =

Sir John Home of Renton, Lord Renton (died 13 July 1671) was appointed Lord Justice Clerk by King Charles II. He was also a Senator of the College of Justice with the title Lord Renton.

== Life ==
John Home was the son of Sir Alexander Home of Renton and Margaret Cockburn. Alexander Home was Sheriff of Berwickshire from 1616 to 1621.

John Home wrote to his cousin Sir Patrick Home of Polwarth that his father had conducted eight witch trials in his jurisdiction.

An Instrument of Sasine dated at Edinburgh 28 August 1671, by Sir Alexander Home of Renton, knight, eldest lawful son to the late Sir John Home of Renton, knight, with the consent of his brother Patrick Home, Sir John's second son, granting to George Home of Kames, the lands of Northfield, with East and Wester Lochs, and the lands of Fewalls in the barony of Coldingham, Berwickshire. Sasine was given on 29 November 1673 and recorded in the General Register on 7 January 1674.

== Criticism ==
Lord Fountainhall stated that Sir John Home of Renton was advanced to his position by favour of the Duke of Lauderdale, although Lauderdale quarrelled with Renton in 1664, and when it was proposed that Renton be made Lord Chancellor of Scotland the Duke remarked that "Renton had not the fortune able to bear out the rank of a Chancellor". Fountainhall says Renton was "a most premptor man to his inferiors or equalls, but a slavish fearer of any whom he supposed to be great at Court, on whom he most obsequiosly fauned."

== Marriages ==
Lord Renton married (1) (contract dated 15 February 1622) Janet, daughter of Sir George Home of Manderston.

Lord Renton married (2) Margaret, daughter of John Stewart, Commendator of Coldingham Priory and son of the disgraced Francis Stewart, 1st Earl of Bothwell. They had at least three sons, of whom:

- Sir Alexander Home, 1st Baronet, of Renton.
- Sir Patrick Home of Lumsden, Bt., whose male issue became extinct in the person of his grandson in 1783.
- Mr. Charles, who, in an action about his share of his father's estate, was designed third lawful son of the late Sir John Home of Renton.

Lord Renton also had two natural children:

- Henry Home of Kames (d. June 1690), Commissary of Lauder. Henry acquired the lands of Kames upon the death of George Home of Kames, his uncle, who died childless. Henry is said to have and left children.
- Isabel, who married Sir John Seton, 1st Baronet, of Garleton.
