= Bill Hume (cartoonist) =

American cartoonist

- Born: William Stanton Hume; March 16, 1916; Missouri, U.S.
- Died: June 27, 2009 (aged 93)
- Notable work: Babysan

William Stanton Hume (March 16, 1916 – June 27, 2009) was an American artist, actor, author, playwright, photographer, film producer, corporate art director, and newspaper man. While stationed in Japan as part of the post World War II occupying force, Hume created the cartoon Babysan which depicted American servicemen in Japan. This comic was very popular with service members in Japan and was published in Stars and Stripes, Yank Magazine, and other military publications. Shortly after his return to the United States, Hume published four books with John Annarino about his time in Japan.

== Early life and education ==
Bill Hume was born in Missouri on March 16, 1916, and was the only child of Henry and Dora Hume. His hometown of Hinton is a small town located just north of Columbia, Missouri. He excelled in his studies and was a very artistic child. Hume attended Hickman High School, became a National Honor Society member, and graduated from Hickman High School at the age of 15. Hume then took a job as a commercial artist to help pay for his education at University of Missouri. He earned a bachelor's degree in Journalism in 1936.

== Career ==
=== Performance arts ===
One year after his graduation, Hume took a position in his Alma Mater's drama department. He developed, produced, and directed one act plays. His creation The Oracle was ranked as one of the top 13 one act plays of 1937. That same year he also began working at Stephens College. It was here that he met the famous Maude Adams who placed him in charge of costume and scenery until 1941.

=== Naval career ===
After failing to get a job as an editor or cartoonist, Bill Hume enlisted in the United States Navy in 1942. World War II was raging at the time and he attempted to get a position as a sonar technician while stationed in Georgia. He was not able to hear the tones that were required in this field and he was appointed a damage control painter and sent to Panama. While in Panama, Hume crafted a dummy from wood, named it Rosalita, and worked as a ventriloquist in a USO troupe. During this assignment Hume was called the "Navy's most talented serviceman" by Yank magazine. In 1945, Hume was discharged from the Navy and returned home to Columbia, MO where he continued to perform with Rosalita at local outings. He opened a commercial art studio, met and married his wife, Mary Mayson Clark on November 13, 1947, and had two children. In 1951, Hume's military status was reactivated and he was sent to Yokosuka, Japan as part of the occupying force. He was a petty officer with Fleet Airforce Service Squadron 120 at the Oppama naval air station and was in charge of maintaining good order. He also served as the editor of the station newspaper The Oppaman. It was at this time that Hume's most successful character Babysan gained notoriety. This cartoon was popular with troops stationed in Japan and after their service was over they brought Babysan back to America. Through the character of Babysan, a smart and sexy Japanese pin-up girl, Hume was able to make fun of American, Japanese, and military culture while educating servicemen in Japanese language, customs, and "the girls that the average man in uniform will meet and like." This publication may have helped with his primary duty of keeping his men out of trouble by informing them about different aspects of life in Japan for sailors. Hume had four books about military life in Japan published after his return to the America.

=== Civilian career ===
When his military service concluded, Hume once again returned to Columbia and continued printing and publishing. He took a job with the Missouri Farmers Association (MFA), made print advertisements, and then expanded into television ads where he designed new techniques focused on animation. He was one of the first to use animation to sell insurance and his films were well received. In 1964, Hume was given the "Best in Class" award from Industrial Photography Magazine for his traffic safety video called Fair Game. Bill Hume retired from Shelter Insurance (previously MFA) as Director of Art.

== Death and legacy ==
Bill Hume died June 27, 2009, at the age of 93. He had two children, three grandchildren, and 4 great-grandchildren at the time of his death.

He is remembered in select communities for his accomplishments and techniques within them. Hume's most influential work and his legacy comes in the form of the cartoon Babysan. He was able to combine his wisdom and wit with his humanity and humor to create an entertaining and often educational work that became very popular. The demand for his product was great enough to publish four books based on his military experience and Babysan when he returned. Many scholars have referenced and featured his works when describing the representation of Japanese during and after World War II.

== Authored works ==
- Babysan's World the Hume'n Slant on Japan OCLC 46486948
- Babysan A Private Look at the Japanese Occupation OCLC 09529575
- Anchors are Heavy OCLC 37571792
- When We Get Back Home From Japan OCLC 41136535 or OCLC 13708466
