= The Mystery of a Hansom Cab =

The Mystery of a Hansom Cab may refer to:

- The Mystery of a Hansom Cab (novel), an 1886 novel by Fergus Hume
- The Mystery of a Hansom Cab (1911 film), an Australian silent film, based on the novel
- The Mystery of a Hansom Cab (1915 film), a British silent film, based on the novel
- The Mystery of a Hansom Cab (1925 film), an Australian silent film, based on the novel
- The Mystery of a Hansom Cab (1935 film), a reissue of the 1925 film
- The Mystery of a Hansom Cab (The General Motors Hour), a 1961 Australian television drama, based on a play adaptation of the novel
- The Mystery of a Hansom Cab (2012 film), an Australian television drama, based on the novel
