= Cezary Skubiszewski =

Australian composer

Cezary Jan Skubiszewski (born 1948) is a Polish-born Australian film and television composer whose work has received international acclaim winning numerous awards. Most notably Cezary is the recipient of four Australian Academy Film Television Awards (AACTA). , APRA 2026 Distinguished Services to the Australian Screen Award and Centenary Medal "for service to Australian society and film production". He composed the film scores for Two Hands (1999), Death Defying Acts (2008) Red Dog (2011), The Sapphires (2012) and the TV series, Picnic at Hanging Rock (2018).

== Personal life and education ==
Skubiszewski was born in Warsaw, Poland. His mother was a classical pianist. Skubiszewski, himself began piano lessons at 8 years of age and received a classical musical education over a period of 10 years under the tutelage of the choir director of the Warsaw Opera. In the late 1960s, he spent one year in Paris and did not return to Poland due to the nation's political situation and his own sense of wanderlust.

In 1974, Skubiszewski moved to Australia. With an interest in both horses and biology, Skubiszewski commenced a undergraduate degree in veterinary medicine at the University of Melbourne. In August 1978, Skubiszewski became an Australian citizen. In 1979 he married Lee (Lesley) Skubiszewski who is an Australian artist. They have two children, Viva Bianca and Jan Skubiszewski. Both work in the Australian entertainment industry.

== Career ==
In Australia, during 1978 and 1979, Skubiszewski played the Moog synthesizer, Rhodes piano and Clavinet in his jazz fusion band, Corroboree (an Aboriginal Australian word meaning a meeting involving traditional dance and song).

Skubiszewski's beginning as a professional music composer began with a piece urgently required for an advertisement for Lincraft, an Australian haberdashery chain store company. He first received widespread recognition as a composer when his film score for the movie, Lilian's Story won awards for best music at the Asia-Pacific Film Festival. Of this score, Skubiszewski said, "It was a very special experience. I wanted to find a nucleus of feeling without the little trills. It sits on you emotionally without bombarding you."

Since then, Skubiszewski has worked as a self-supporting composer and arranger, conductor, producer, and musician.

His music is heard in television programs such as Neighbours, 19 episodes of the 1994 Australian children's program Sky Trackers (1996) and 13 episodes of Driven Crazy (1998). In 2018, Skubiszewski wrote the soundtrack for the Picnic at Hanging Rock television series.

Skubiszewski's movies scores include Two Hands (1999), Red Dog (2011) and The Sapphires (2012).

Among his compositions for commercials is Skubiszewski's work for Carlton Draught: Big Ad, a parody of the epic style of historical movies and advertisements of large companies. He created a re-working of Carl Orff's Carmina Burana with humorous lyrics.

== Awards and nominations ==
Skubiszewski has been nominated in Australian award programs and has won on several occasions. These programs include the APRA Awards, the ARIA Music Awards, the Film Critics Circle of Australia awards and others. Skubiszewski was nominated on five occasions in the ARIAS for Lillian's Story, The Sound of One Hand Clapping, After the Deluge, Night and Red Dog: True Blue. In 2013, the Australian Film Critics Association gave Skubiszewski the award for best music score for The Sapphire. Skubiszewski won the Australian Academy of Cinema and Television Arts award for best original music score for Falling for Figaro (2021). Two Hands won the Australian Guild of Screen Composers in 1999. Skubiszewski has won the Film Critics Circle award on five occasions and nominated on another two. In 2000, Skubiszewski tied with Edmund Choi with The Dish. He received the best music score award for Bootmen (2000), The Book of Revelation (2006), Bran Nue Dae (2009) and The Sapphires (2012). His nominations were for Beneath the Hill (2010) and Death Defying Acts (2007). Red Dog also won an Inside Film award in 2011.

=== APRA Music Awards ===
Year	Nominee / work	Award	Result	Ref.
1996	Lilian's Story (Cezary Skubiszewski)	Best Film Score	Nominated	
1999	The Sound of One Hand Clapping (C Skubiszewski)	Best Film Score	Nominated	
2000	Two Hands (C Skubiszewski, Jan Skubiszewski)	Best Film Score	Won	
2003	After the Deluge (C Skubiszewski)	Best Soundtrack Album	Won	
2003	After the Deluge (C Skubiszewski)	Best Television Theme	Nominated	
2003	After the Deluge (C Skubiszewski)	Best Music for a Mini-Series or Telemovie	Nominated	
2003	Black and White (C Skubiszewski)	Best Feature Film Score	Nominated	
2005	The Brush-Off (C Skubiszewski)	Best Music for a Mini-Series or Telemovie	Nominated	
2006	The Society Murders (C Skubiszewski)	Best Music for a Mini-Series or Telemovie	Nominated	
2007	The Book of Revelation (C Skubiszewski)	Feature Film Score of the Year	Nominated	
2007	The Book of Revelation (C Skubiszewski)	Best Soundtrack Album	Nominated	
2008	Night (C Skubiszewski)	Best Music for a Documentary	Won	
2008	"Free Falling 2" (C Skubiszewski, J Skubiszewski, Andy Baldwin, Clairanne Browne, Jules Pascoe) – Night	Best Original Song Composed for the Screen	Nominated	
2009	Death Defying Acts (C Skubiszewski)	Best Soundtrack Album	Won	
2009	Carla Cametti PD (C Skubiszewski, J Skubiszewski)	Best Television Theme	Nominated	
2010	Beneath Hill 60 (C Skubiszewski)	Best Feature Film Score	Nominated	
2013	The Mystery of a Hansom Cab (C Skubiszewski)	Best Music for a Mini-Series or Telemovie	Won	
2014	Once My Mother (C Skubiszewski)	Best Music for a Documentary	Won	
2014	Serangoon Road – "Episode 6" (C Skubiszewski, J Skubiszewski)	Best Music for a Television Series or Serial	Won	
2014	The Broken Shore (C Skubiszewski)	Best Soundtrack Album	Won	
2014	The Broken Shore (C Skubiszewski)	Best Music for a Mini-Series or Telemovie	Nominated	
2014	Parer’s War (C Skubiszewski)	Best Music for a Mini-Series or Telemovie	Nominated	
2015	Women He's Undressed (C Skubiszewski))	Best Soundtrack Album	Nominated	
2016	Oddball (C Skubiszewski))	Feature Film Score of the Year	Nominated	
2017	Monsieur Mayonnaise (C Skubiszewski))	Best Music for a Documentary	Nominated	
2017	Monsieur Mayonnaise (Deborah Morgan, C Skubiszewski)	Best Soundtrack Album	Nominated	
2018	Picnic at Hanging Rock (C Skubiszewski, J Skubiszewski))	Best Music for a Television Series or Serial	Won	
2019	Me and My Left Brain (C Skubiszewski)	Best Soundtrack Album	Nominated	
2021	Chef Antonio's Recipes for Revolution (C Skubiszewski)	Best Music for a Documentary	Nominated	
2021	Halifax: Retribution (C Skubiszewski, J Skubiszewski)	Best Music for a Mini-Series or Telemovie	Nominated	
2021	Halifax: Retribution (C Skubiszewski, J Skubiszewski)	Best Television Theme	Won	
2023	Flyways (C Skubiszewski)	Best Music for a Documentary	Won	

== Selected discography ==
- 1981 Home at Last (symphony)
- 1991 Soundescape (music theatre)
- 1994 Sky Trackers (TV)
- 1995 Lilian's Story (film)
- 1996 Hurah a.k.a. Heaven Sent (film)
- 1998 The Sound of One Hand Clapping (film)
- 1999 Two Hands (film)
- 1999 Witch Hunt (TV film)
- 2000 Bootmen (film)
- 2000 The Wog Boy
- 2001 La Spagnola
- 2002 Black and White (film)
- 2003 After the Deluge (TV)
- 2003 The Rage in Placid Lake
- 2004 The Brush-Off (TV)
- 2005 Hating Alison Ashley (film)
- 2006 The Book of Revelation (film)
- 2006 The Society Murders (TV)
- 2007 Death Defying Acts (film)
- 2008 Night (film)
- 2008 (Lionel) (film)
- 2009 Carla Cametti PD (TV)
- 2009 Blessed (film)
- 2009 Bran Nue Dae (film)
- 2010 Beneath Hill 60 (film)
- 2010 Wolf Blass television advertisements
- 2011 Red Dog (film)
- 2012 The Sapphires (film)
- 2015 Oddball (film)
- 2016 Red Dog: True Blue (film)
- 2018 Tiger (film)
- 2020 Mosquito State (film)
- 2021 Falling for Figaro (film)
