= The Mystery of a Hansom Cab (2012 film) =

- Based on: The Mystery of a Hansom Cab by Fergus Hume
- Screenplay by: Glen Dolman
- Directed by: Shawn Seet
- Country of origin: Australia
- Original language: English

Production
- Executive producer: Ewan Burnett
- Producer: Margot McDonald
- Production location: Melbourne
- Production companies: Burberry Entertainment; Film Victoria

Original release
- Network: ABC
- Release: 28 October 2012

The Mystery of a Hansom Cab is a 2012 Australian television movie about the events surrounding the murder of Oliver Whyte, whose body is discovered in a hansom cab in 19th-century Melbourne. The investigation is conducted under the leadership of Detective Samuel Gorby, who soon arrests Brian Fitzgerald, who had hoped to marry Whyte's betrothed, rich wool merchant Mark Fittelby's daughter, Madge. Brian is defended by barrister Duncan Calton and Detective Kilsip, who eventually discovers secret blackmail against the Fittelbys which leads to the discovery of a previous marriage and a legitimate daughter, Sal Rawlins, which means that Frettlby is a bigamist and his second daughter Madge is illegitimate. It is an adaption of the 1886 novel of the same name, created by Fergus Hume, who wrote it as an examination into the evils of the 'Big City' and the corruption that can be found inside it.

Directed by Shawn Seet, with the screenplay written by Glen Dolman, The Mystery of a Hansom Cab was released on 28 October on ABC1 as an ABC-exclusive drama telemovie. As the fourth film adaptation of the Hume novel, the telemovie received moderate praise for its work in “bringing colonial Melbourne to life with wonderful detail” but overall received mixed reviews.

== Plot ==
In colonial Melbourne, two men named Oliver Whyte and Roger Moreland, are in a public house, having a discussion with Whyte lamenting his circumstances. Whyte ends the conversation stating "this poet's time has come". After stumbling, drunk, through the streets, Oliver eventually collapses in a stupor, where he is helped by a man who recognises him into a hansom cab before leaving. Awakening in the cab, Whyte discovers that the man has returned, but is soon killed through the use of chloroformed rag by him, who steals a written paper from his jacket and flees the scene through another cab.

Two weeks earlier, Oliver Whyte is attending a lavish party hosted by Mark Frettlby, where he meets Duncan Calton, a well-renowned barrister, Frettlby's daughter Margaret ('Madge'), Brian Fitzgerald, a rich wool merchant whom he offends, Felix Rolleston, a journalist and socialite. While there, Whyte tries and fails to make conversation with Madge. After the party he presents a sealed note to Frettlby, implied to be blackmail. Mark Frettlby soon after informs Madge she is betrothed to Whyte, which she is displeased with as she is in love with Fitzgerald, who promises that he “won’t let this happen”.

With advice from Calton, Frettlby breaks the betrothal, which drives Whyte to go to and become intoxicated at the pub on the night of the murder. On the same night, Fitzgerald is given a note that causes him to leave his poker game and take to the streets, where he meets a drunk Whyte and soon helps him onto the cab before leaving and then returning, but whose face is not shown when he returns. Whyte’s body is initially unrecognised, and Detective Samuel Gorby begins to investigate his murder. At his home in the morning, Fitzgerald burns the note. Detective Gorby soon finds the identity the body of Whyte and sees Fitzgerald as the prime suspect. Fitzgerald and Madge soon become engaged to one another

In a run-down boarding house, owned by Mother Guttersnipe, a girl dies in the night from fever, whose necklace is taken by her friend, Sal Rawlins, who flees the house.

With evidence stacking against him Fitzgerald is soon arrested, with Calton defending him, a rival police detective, Detective Kilsip, aids him by seeking new evidence to aid Fitzgerald, which includes Sal bringing him the note on the night of the murder. During the trial, Calton is able to successfully defend Fitzgerald and soon he is declared innocent and freed. Despite this, Fitzgerald refuses to say what was in the note in order to protect Madge. Soon, Frettlby is considered the most likely suspect. Upon further investigation by Calton, it is discovered that Mark Frettlby had an affair with Rosanna Moore, a famous burlesque dancer whom he married during a passionate encounter in his youth, which soon resulted in a child being produced, Sarah (Sal). The blackmail document is their marriage certificate. Frettlby is told by Rosanna's mother that the child has died and Rosanna has gone away.

Calton and Kilsip continue to try to find the real killer, even though Fitzpatrick wants them to drop it, as this will reveal the secret he has tried so hard to keep - even willing to be hanged to keep it. They deduce that the overcoat and chloroform bottle must have been thrown away nearby and discover them in a tree. The chloroform bottle has the chemist's name and so they discover bought it from the poison book record kept at the chemist. The killer's true identity is revealed to be Roger Moreland, Whyte’s friend who he was drinking with on the night of the murder, who discovered that Whyte had come upon Frettlby’s marriage document to Rosanna Moore and was planning to use it to blackmail Frettlby into allowing him to become engaged to Madge. On the night of the murder, Moreland put on Whyte's overcoat and scarf and used the chloroform with the intent to steal the papers and blackmail Frettlby himself for money, but used too much in the process and killed Whyte.

Moreland visits Frettlby who exchanges the marriage certificate for a cheque for £5000. Sal has been given employment as Madge's maid and Mark Frettlby suffers from a heart attack after he notices Sals necklace, which he gave to Rosanna, and realises she is his daughter Sarah. He falls on the stairs and drops the marriage certificate, which is read by Madge, who realises she is illegitimate. Calton arrives to comfort his friend and Frettlby admits the secret, asking Calton to make sure Sal gets a substantial amount from his estate and not to let the two girls know they are sisters. Calton agrees. Frettlby dies. Fitzpatrick arrives and Madge tells him she knows the secret and that she is illegitimate. He reassures her that he will always love her just as she is and they are reconciled. Calton, Kilsip and Fitzpatrick find the blank cheque stub and stand guard outside the bank the next morning hoping to arrest the killer as he exits the bank with the blackmail evidence, £5000. Moreland is arrested by Detective Kilsip and placed into jail, where he hangs himself before he stands trial, which would have revealed Frettlby’s disgrace. Calton, Kilsip and Fitzpatrick burn the marriage certificate, thereby keeping Madge's secret.

Sal uses the money to create a woman's shelter, something inspired by her previous works in the Salvation Army.

Madge and Fitzgerald marry soon after and would sail back to Europe on their honeymoon.

== Cast ==
- John Waters as Mark Frettlby: A rich, affluent wool merchant, father of Madge and, secretly, Sal.
- Marco Chiappi as Duncan Calton: An extremely able barrister, who defends Brian Fitzgerald after his arrest and soon discovers the reason for the murder.
- Brett Climo as Oliver Whyte: A man, recently arrived in Australia, who planned to blackmail Mark Frettlby in order to secure money and influence by marrying Madge but is killed by his friend.
- Shane Jacobson as Detective Samuel Gorby: A detective for the Melbourne Police, who initially finds Brian Fitzgerald guilty of the murder.
- Jessica De Gouw as Madge: The upper-class daughter of Mark Frettlby with his departed wife, Louise, who is in love with Brian Fitzgerald and is initially engaged to Oliver Whyte.
- Oliver Ackland as Brian Fitzgerald: A wool merchant who is in love with Madge, initially considered the murderer, he eventually helps discover the truth of it.
- Chelsie Preston Crayford as Sal Rawlins: The daughter of Mark and Rosanna Moore, her lower-class upbringing and birth sees her have a key place in aiding the investigation.
- Felix Williamson as Detective Kilsip: A rival to Detective Gorby who helps uncover the true reason for the murder.
- Charlie Cousins as Roger Moreland: Oliver Whyte’s friend, who murders him and steals the blackmail documents from him.
- Helen Morse as Mother Guttersnipe: Sal’s grandmother who raised her in a boarding house
- Anna McGahan as Rosanna Moore / The Queen: A burlesque dancer who had an illicit affair with Mark Frettlby, eventually giving birth to Sal, Mark’s daughter.
- Michael Carman as Malcolm Royston: The cabman who is a key witness to the crime, whose hansom cab the movie is named for.
- Nathan Lovejoy as Felix Rolleston: A socialite and journalist who documents and publishes the events of the murder.
- Kerry Walker as Mrs. Sampson: A landlady who Whyte was staying with prior to his death.
- Gerry Connolly as Reginald Valpy.
- Tony Rickards as John Knox.

== Production ==
Production for The Mystery of a Hansom Cab began on 30 April 2012. Created on behalf of ABC TV Fiction and Film Victoria, Burberry Entertainment, a multi award-winning television production company, was chosen to make the telemovie, hiring Director Shawn Seet, famous for his work on the Underbelly television series, to make the adaptation. Writer Glen Dolman was chosen to create the screenplay for the telemovie, a known writer, he had received many accolades for his work on the 2012 Network Ten Drama ‘Hawke’. Funded by ABC TV Fiction, the head of ABC TV Fiction, Carole Sklan, wrote that ABC was “delighted to be bringing this compelling Australian murder mystery to ABC TV. It is a true classic, the story keeps surprising, and the creative team at Burberry have brought together a wonderful cast.”

Casting decisions included John Waters, most famous for his work in the Australian Drama-Comedy Offspring, Shane Jacobson who had been in previous Australian Telemovies and Chelsie Preston Crayford and Anna McGahan of Underbelly: Razor fame. The decision to include brief nudity and depictions of prostitution during several scenes was done in order to ensure historical accuracy during the filming.

In comparison to previous efforts, the film making techniques were increasingly more advanced when compared to the productions made in 1911, 1915 and 1925, using modern audio-graphical techniques and HD cameras. Filming was conducted in Melbourne itself, the purpose of which was to give credence to the colonial Melbourne setting that The Mystery of a Hansom Cab took place in. Historical accuracy was attempted wholesale by Seet, during production, there was a major effort put “to convey a convincing sense of place and situatedness… [the telemovie] deploys a sophisticated blend of period location shooting, CGI, and precisely researched production design.” Similarly, “The Mystery of a Hansom Cab team combined location work in North Melbourne with digitally altered shots of the central areas of the city that play such an important role in the narrative," ensuring that the movie itself attained high standards of truthfulness to colonial Melbourne.

The production was followed closely by the National Film and Sound Archive of Australia, who would utilize aspects of the creation of the film for their archival purposes, including “DVDs, scripts stills and promotional material”, useful, in their words, “so that future generations can see this popular Australian story’s translation to the screen.”

Filming for The Mystery of a Hansom Cab finished on 25 May, after less than a month’s worth of production, with trailer advertisements for the film releasing from 9 October

== Reception ==
The Mystery of a Hansom Cab released on 28 October 2012 at 8:30pm on ABC1, marketed as a Romantic Murder-Mystery and released as part of their Drama section. Their endorsement for the movie, as placed on the ABC website, was phrased thusly:

“A man is murdered in 19th Century Melbourne. The investigation uncovers a trail of secrets and scandal spreading from opium dens and brothels to the cream of society. Based on the novel by Fergus Hulme."

After the completion of its runtime on the ABC1 television network the telemovie was made available on the ABC website.

‘The Silver Petticoat Review’ an online reviewer of period dramas, with a specific focus on the Victorian era that Mystery of a Hansom Cab is set in, stated that “Once you adjust to the non-linear creative choice, the strategy works as a kind of ‘Gothic’ Victorian. The writing inspires guesswork. Furthermore, the atmosphere of The Mystery of a Hansom Cab is fantastic... Everything that goes into this as a production paints a pretty picture. The acting is good as are the sets and costumes. I enjoyed the discovery of new talent”.

== Thematic Analysis ==
The Mystery of a Hansom Cab depicts a dramatic murder taking place in Colonial Melbourne, detailing the efforts that a detective of the police force must go through in order to solve this crime, serving to inspire thought into the cultural and political context of the mid-1800s. Many of the themes that are involved with the original novel are displayed in the telemovie itself, with the vast majority revolving around the concepts of colonialism, the ‘Big City’ and the ‘White Settler’, specifically in how they corrupt the human condition.

Lucy Sussex’s ‘Blockbuster!: Fergus Hume and the Mystery of a Hansom Cab’ examines the film adaptations of the novel itself, specifically the scenes of the telemovie which make references to the events of the 1800s as well as the symbolism inherent in these scenes. Specifically, a great deal of importance is placed on the prostitution scene, which showcases the reputation that such professions would have had in the area itself, they represent the very bottom of the ‘lower class’, however, the burlesque scene that follows proceeds to then anachronously use the modern idealisation of such people. The point of such scene is to show the ‘seedy underbelly’ of Melbourne during this period, the purpose being to show the depths that the detective was willing to sink to in order to find out the truth of the crime that he is pursuing and the ‘grimy’ nature it has when contrasted with the upper class nature of later scenes.
