= En L'An 2000 =

French drawing series on scientific progress about the year 2000

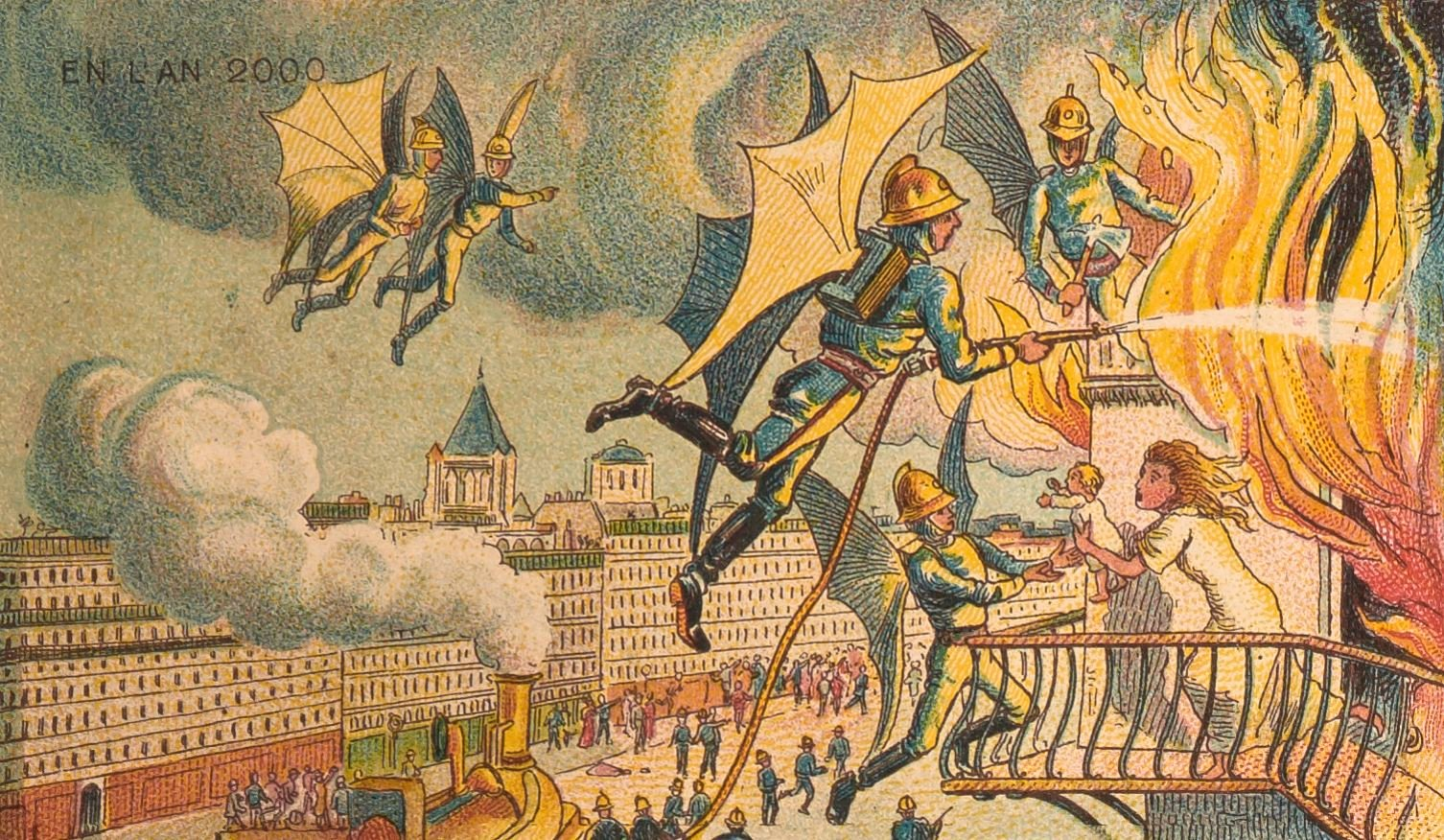
Air firefighters, one of the postcard images

En L'An 2000 (In the Year 2000, also loosely translated as France in the 21st Century) is a French image series depicting scientific advances imagined as achieved by the year 2000. At least 78 were produced, by artists including Jean-Marc Côté. They were printed in 1899, 1900, 1901 and 1910, first on paper as cigar box inserts, and later as picture postcards, but never distributed. The only known set of the postcards was acquired by writer Isaac Asimov, who featured them in his nonfiction work Futuredays: A Nineteenth Century Vision of the Year 2000 (Henry Holt and Company, 1986).

== Gallery ==
Examples of artworks

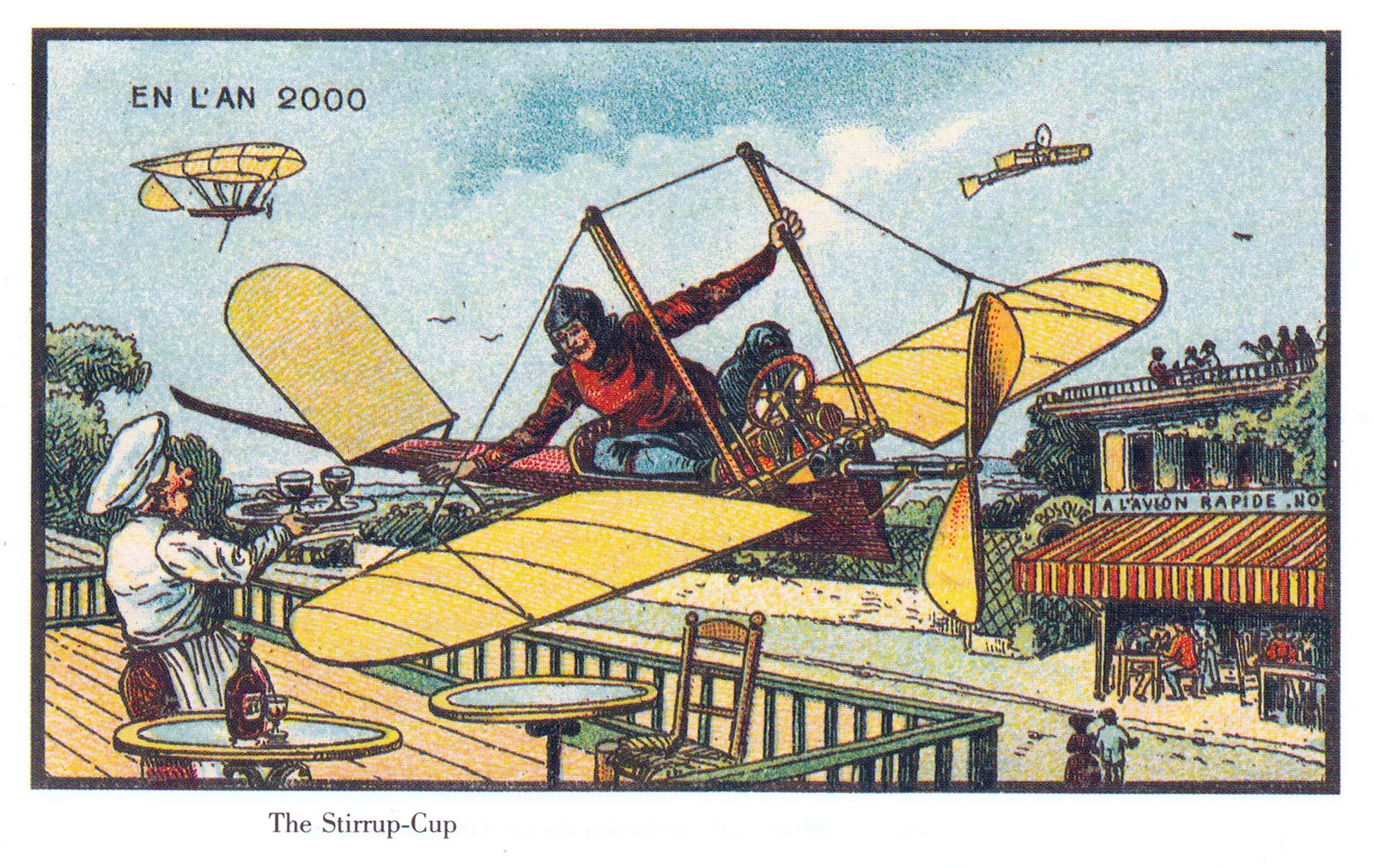
Air cup

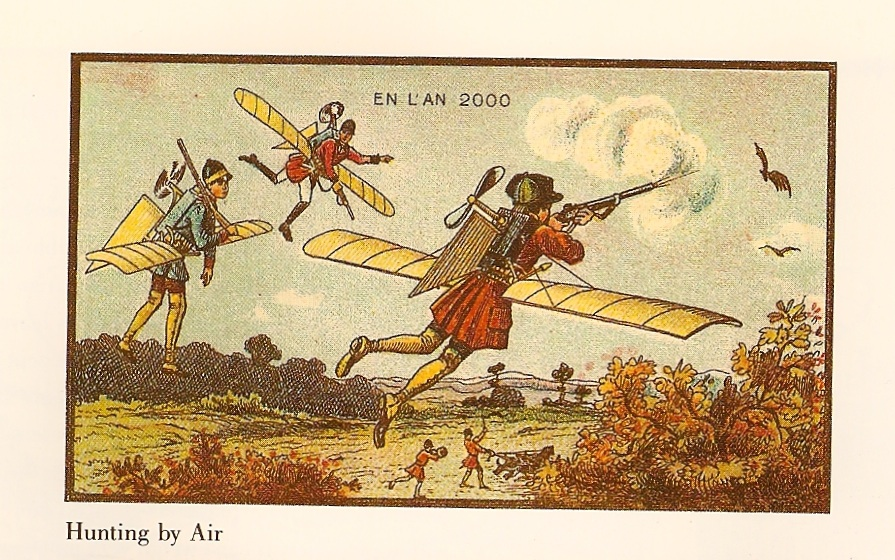
Air hunters

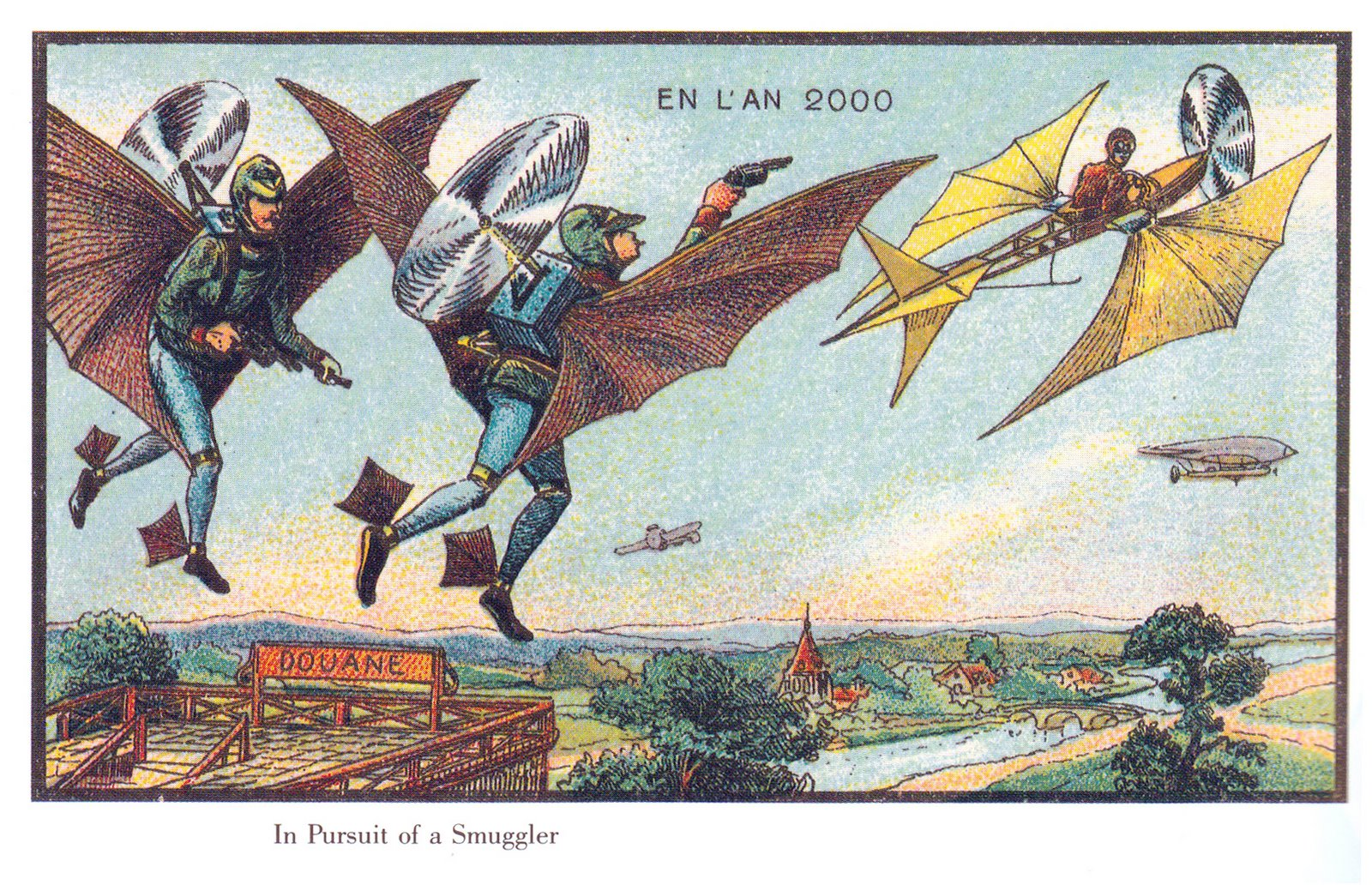
Air police

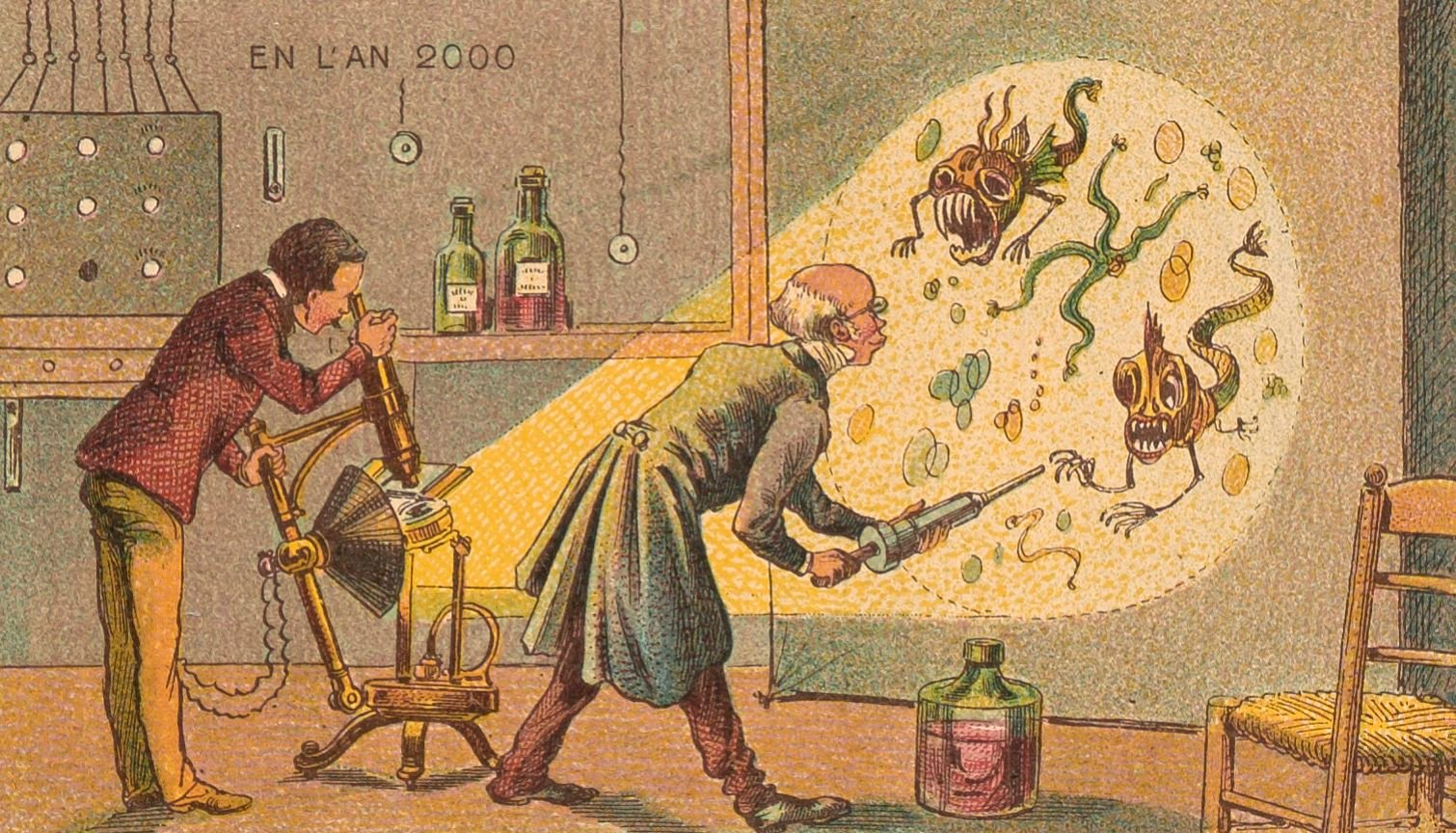
Microbes

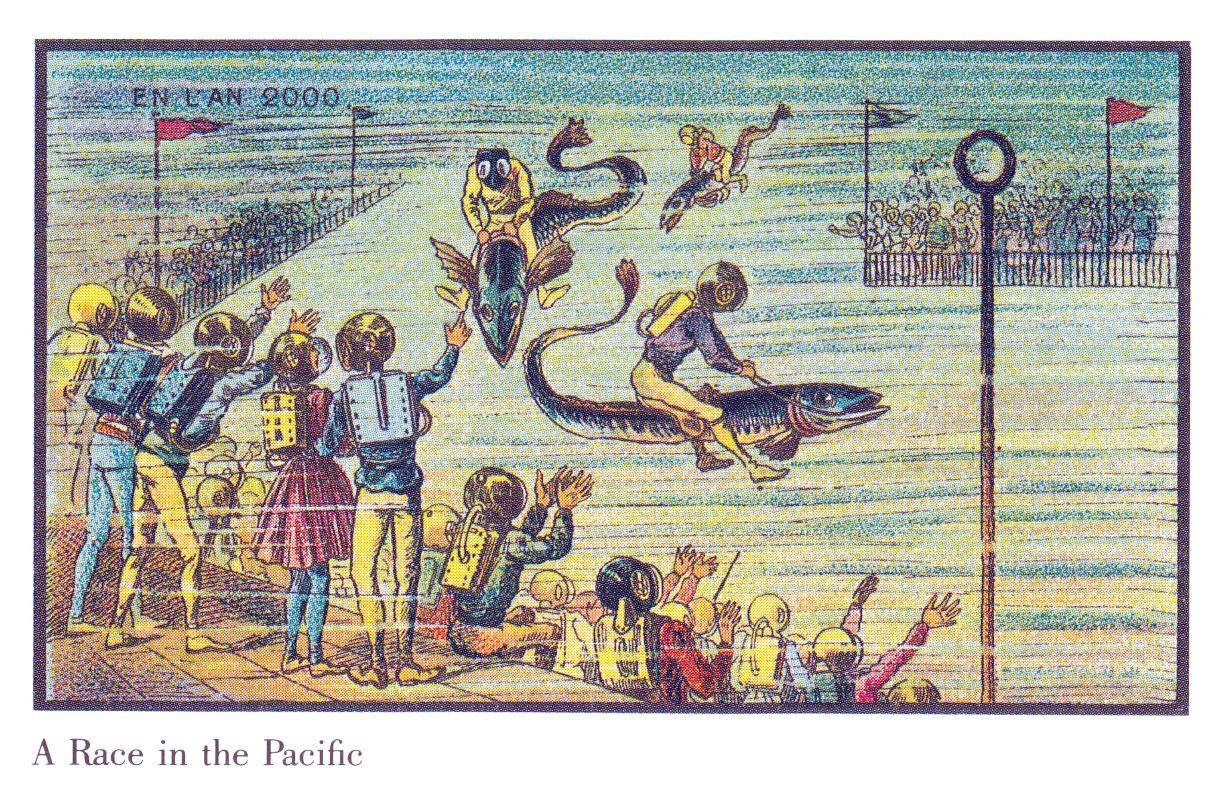
A Race in the Pacific

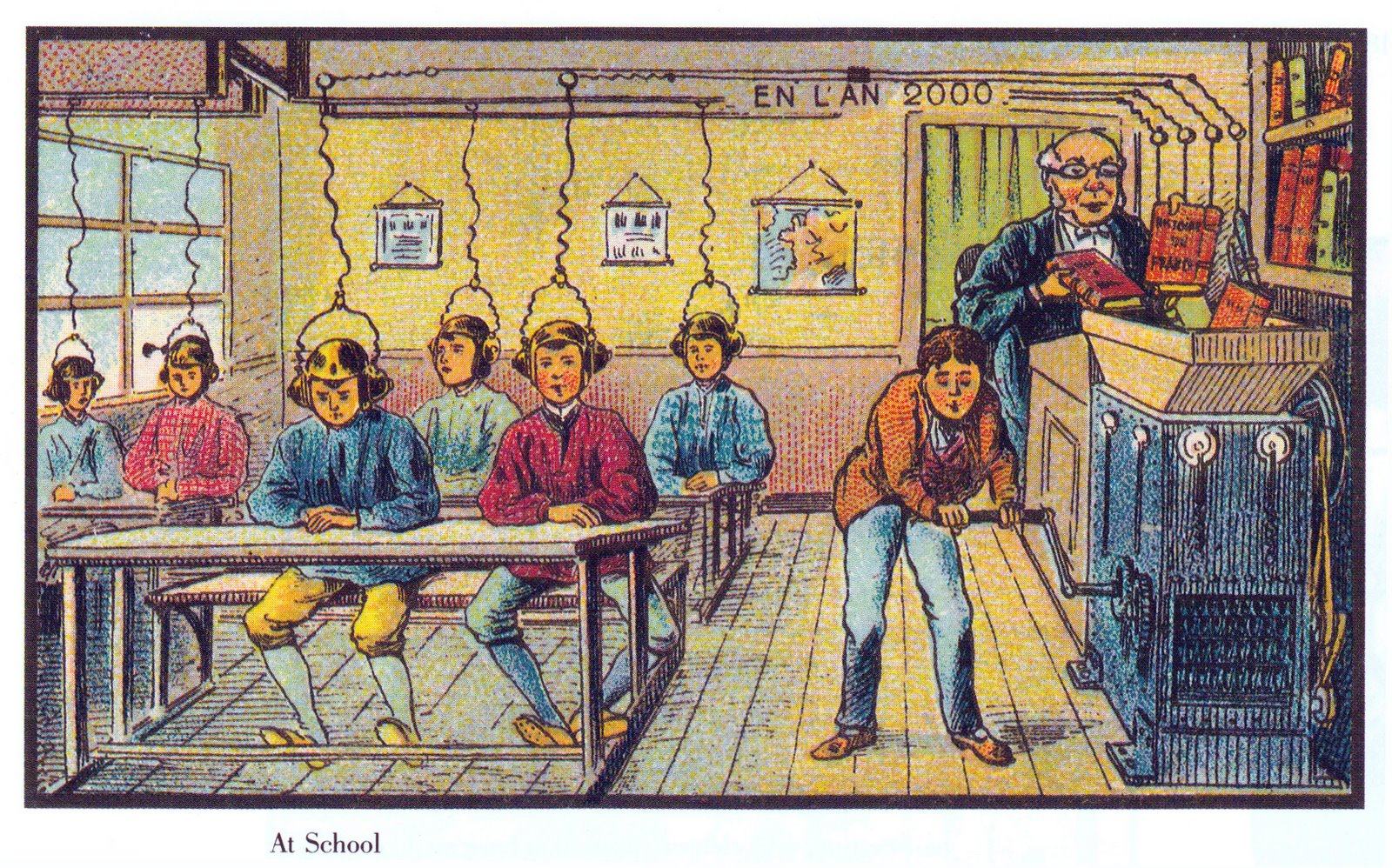
Future school

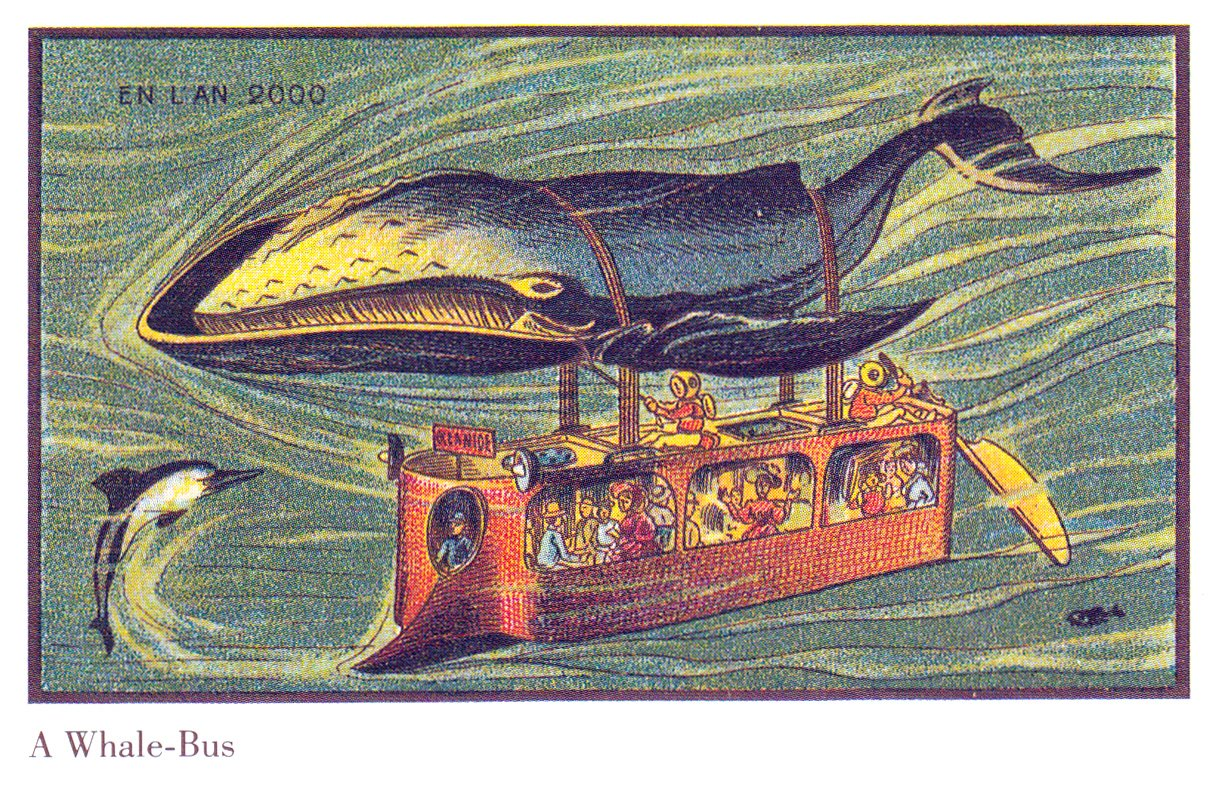
A Whale-bus

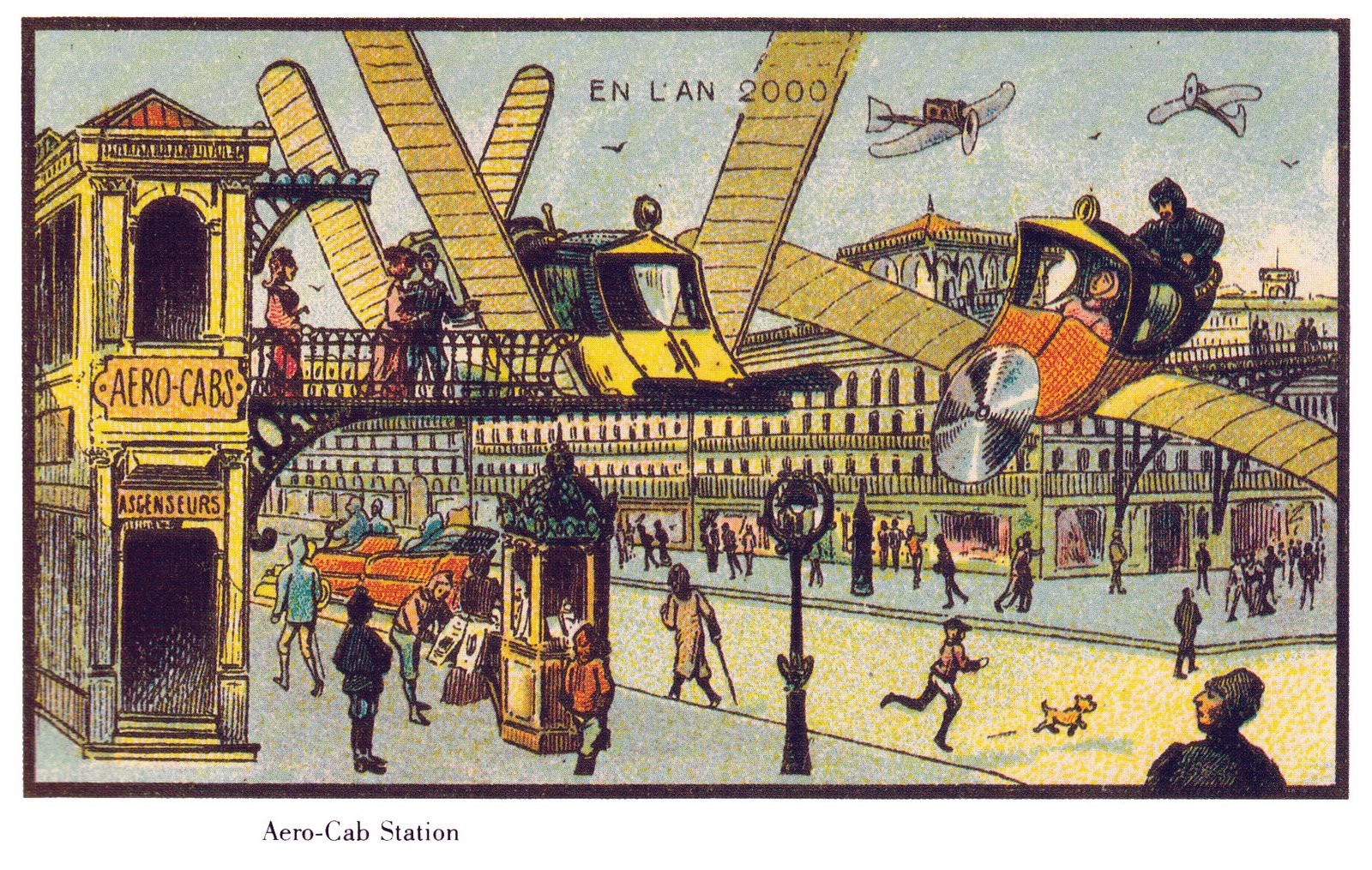
Air cabs - hansom cabs of the (then) future, depicted in En L'An 2000 illustrated by Jean-Marc Côté

== See also ==
- Retrofuturism
