= Hansom cab =

Horse-drawn vehicle for hire

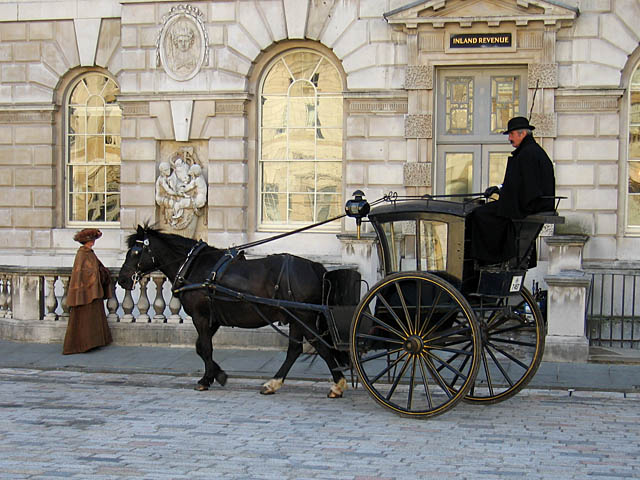
Hansom cab and driver in the 2004 movie Sherlock Holmes and the Case of the Silk Stocking, set in 1903 London

The hansom cab is a two-wheeled horse-drawn vehicle designed as a carriage for hire in London. First patented in 1834 by Joseph Hansom of England, and named the Hansom Safety Cab, it was designed to have a low centre of gravity to improve stability when maneuvering London's crowded streets, while light enough to be pulled by a single horse. The concept was substantially redesigned in 1836 by John Chapman, whose improved design was later widely copied, though retaining the "hansom" name. The hansom cab became the most common vehicle for hire, and was exported across Europe, to other British colonies, and to the US. It is easily recognized by the high seat of the driver behind the passenger compartment.

== Design ==
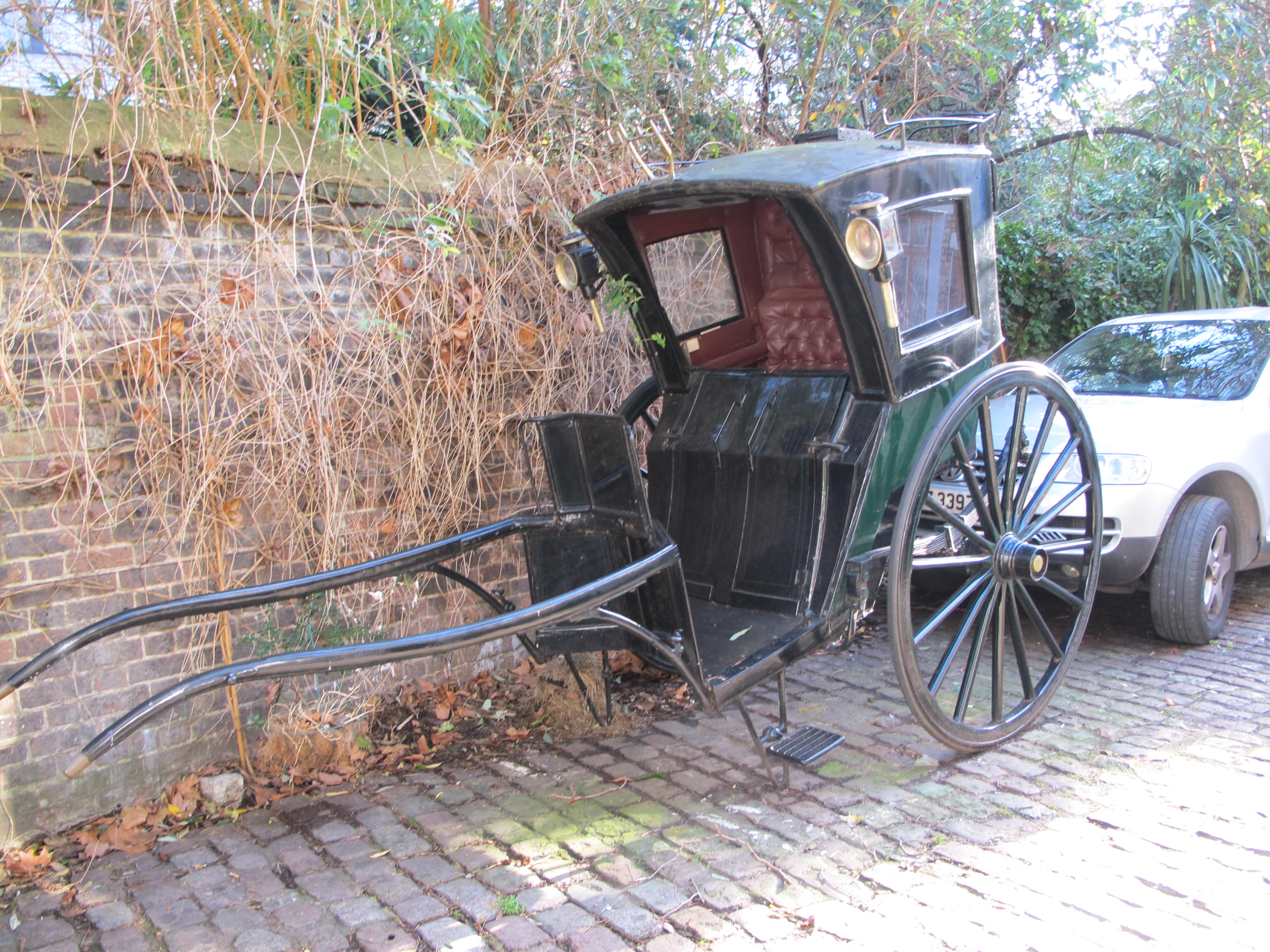
Hansom cab, showing low easy entry, hatch on the roof, and folding doors to protect passengers from weather and mud

The vehicle seats two passengers while the driver sits on a seat behind the vehicle. Passengers can give instructions to the driver, or pay, through a hatch in the roof. The driver could operate a lever to release the doors so that passengers could alight. In some designs, the driver could operate a device that balanced the cab and reduced strain on the horse. The passengers were protected from the elements by folding wooden doors that enclosed their feet and legs and thus protected their clothes from splashing mud. Later versions also had an up-and-over glass window above the doors to complete the enclosure of the passengers. Additionally, a curved fender mounted forward of the doors protected passengers from stones thrown up by the hooves of the horse.

Its main features were low-slung bodywork, high wheels and a rearward driving seat—the latter not at first evident. The purpose of its design was to combine speed with safety, having a low centre of gravity, essential for safe cornering and overtaking. Wheels were originally 7'6" in diameter, later becoming much smaller although still large in proportion. The dashboard was curved at the rear of the shafts, bringing the hind-quarters of the horse fairly near the vehicle, for better control. There would be room for two passengers facing forward, on a single cross-seat, their legs protected by knee flaps.

Some of the earlier cab designs before the hansoms had passengers entering and exiting from the rear, and drivers in the front, some high on the roof. The flaw in the early designs was that it was too common for passengers to 'bilk' the driver (leave without paying), and the high front seat was dangerous because any sudden tipping—a quick stop, a horse stumbling, a wheel breaking—would pitch the driver from on high to the street below, occasionally killing the driver. The Hansom design of placing the driver in the rear and passengers entering and exiting from the front reduced both bilking and driver injuries.

A description by an 1884 amateur cabbie's viewpoint:

The roof shines before you like a great, wet house-top, and, as to the horse, of which you can see no more than the head and a few inches of neck, its distance is quiet startling. The wheels cannot be seen, so the difficulty of estimating the width of the spaces that you dare drive through is very considerable; there is a feeling of slippery insecurity about the legs too; so that, beyond the danger of being flung right over the whole thing—as cabbies often are in falls and collisions—it does not seem at all impossible to slide out sideways.

— 'A Day on a Hansom', By An Amateur Cabby, The Pall Mall Gazette, 14 July 1884

=== Variations ===
The Tribus was placed on the streets in 1844, carrying three passengers, the door in the rear, with the driver in the rear and to one side. The Tribus had five windows—two front, one each side, one in the rear—and a small safety wheel in the front to keep the vehicle upright in the case of a horse falling or breaking a shaft. The 1844 'Quartobus had four wheels, held four passengers, and was not a successful design.

The court hansom had four wheels and space for two passengers. The 1887 parlour hansom had two wheels and held four passengers face-to-face, two on each side, with two sliding doors at the rear.

Other vehicles similar to the Hansom cab include the American light trade cart for deliveries such as bread, the bow-fronted hansom which was fully enclosed and entered through a side door, and the Brougham Hansom which was entered from the rear and driven from a seat on the fore-part of the roof.

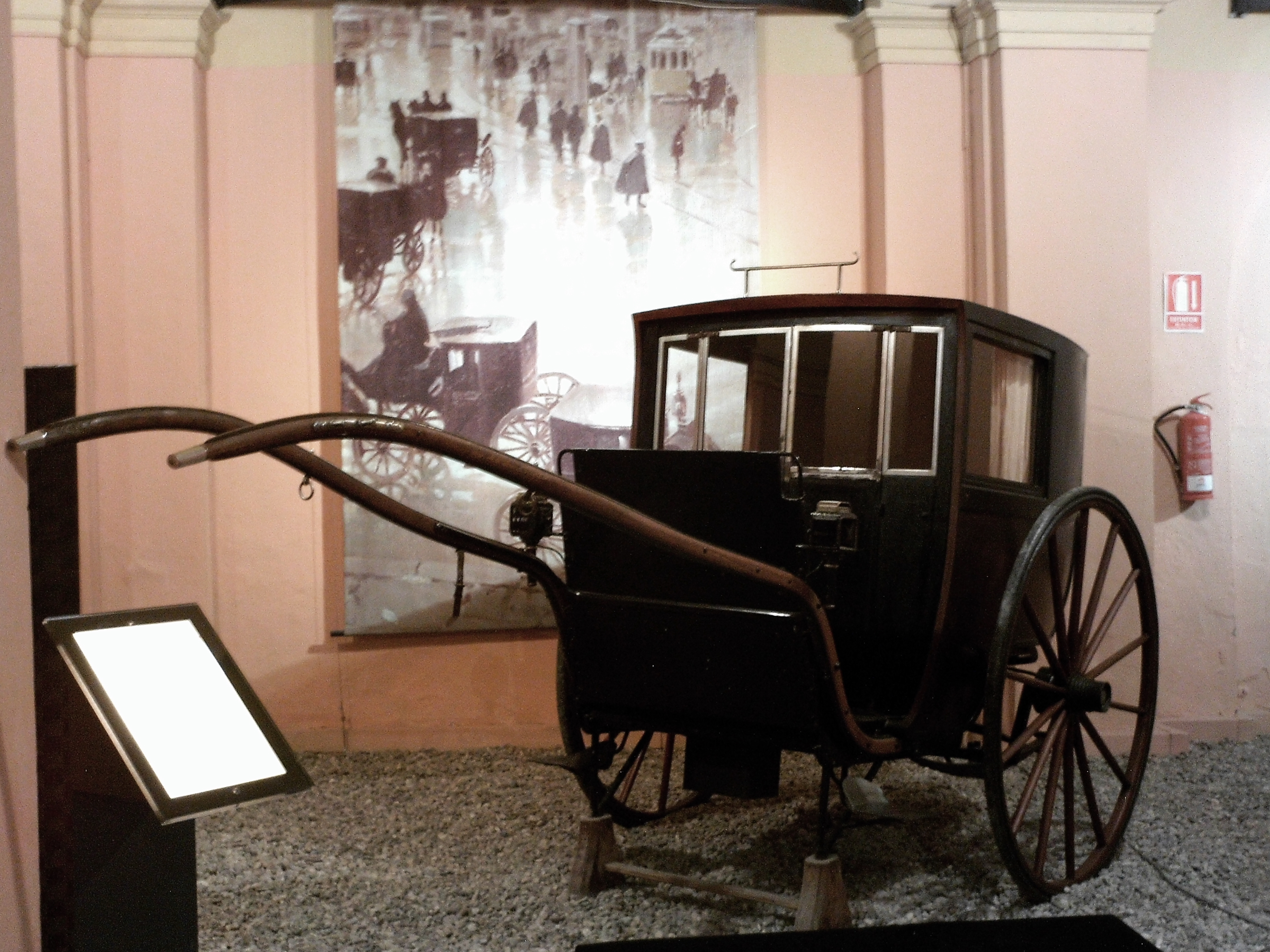
A bow-fronted hansom

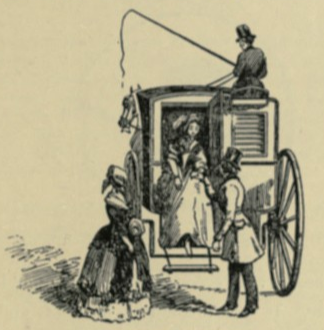
Tribus hansom

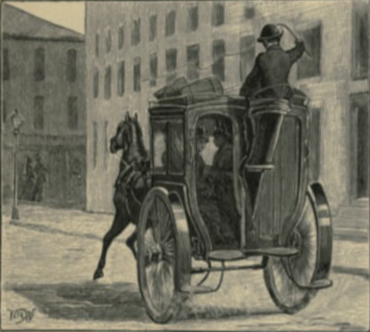
Parlour's hansom

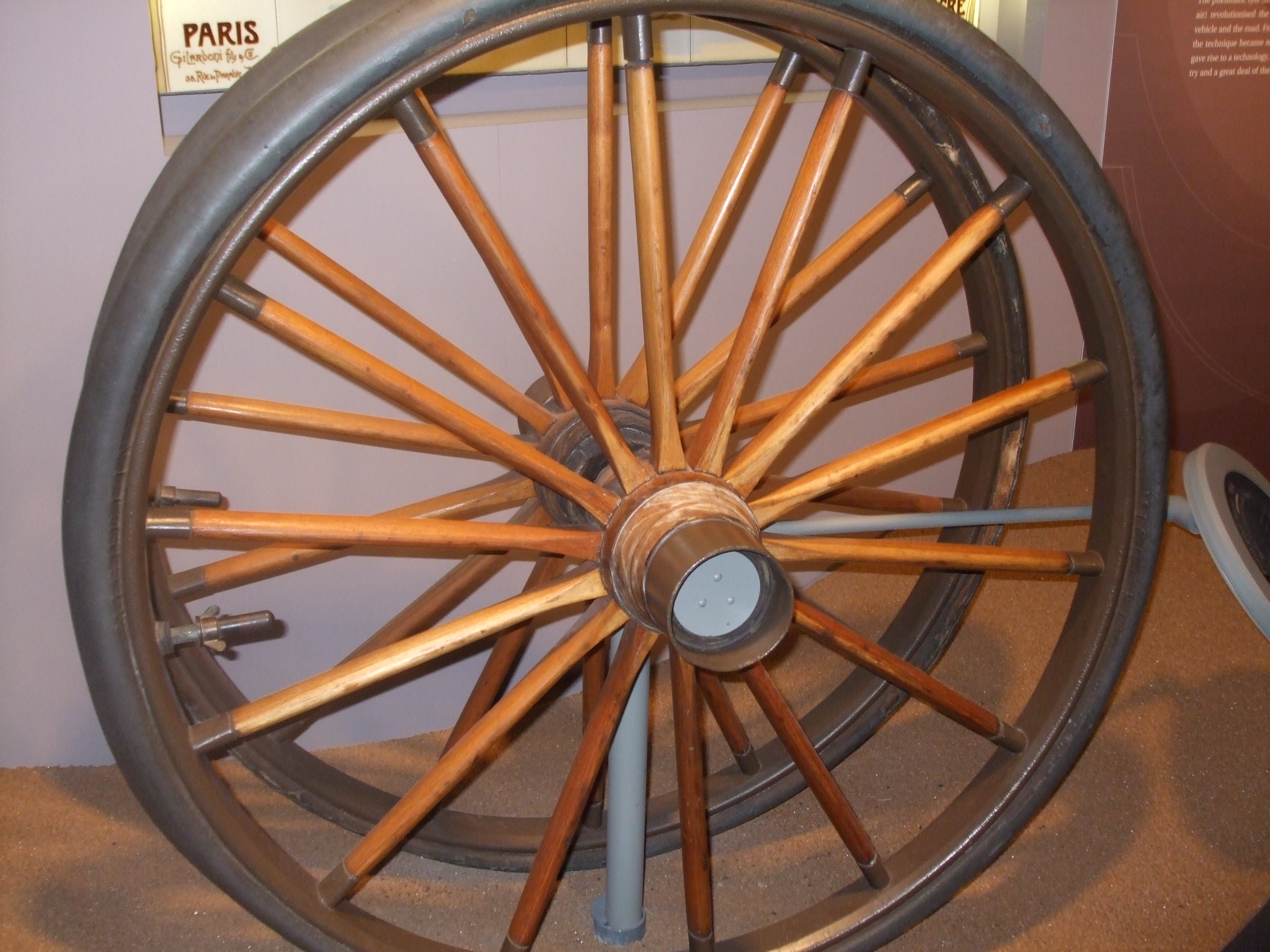
Pneumatic wheels used on later hansom cabs (1909)}

== Historical context ==
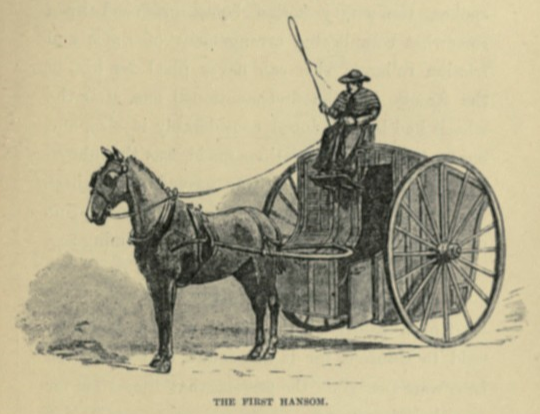
Hansom's original design

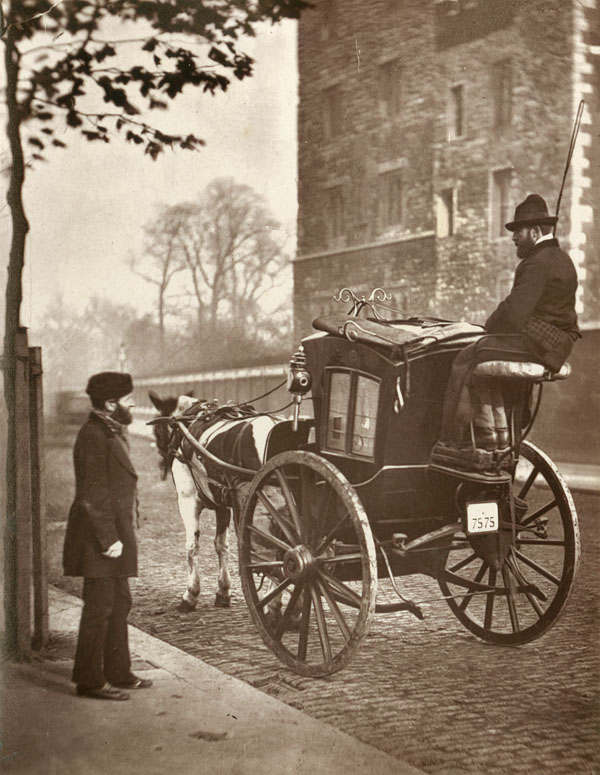
Chapman-styled hansom, London 1877

The hansom cab was designed and patented in 1834 by Joseph Hansom, an architect from York, England. The vehicle was developed and tested by Hansom in Hinckley. Originally called the Hansom safety cab, it was designed to combine speed with safety, with a low centre of gravity for safe cornering. Joseph Hansom's two-wheeled "safety cab" proved too heavy and was not commercially successful. In the original design, the driver sat on the front center of the roof. The wheels were 7'6" tall, as tall as the roof of the vehicle, and there were two stub axles.

In 1836, John Chapman, secretary of the Safety Cabriolet and Two‑Wheeled Carriage Company, redesigned the vehicle, putting the driver on a high seat to the rear of the roof, reducing the size of the wheels, and using a dropped axle design—later versions had straight axles directly under the passenger seat. Chapman and investor Gillett patented their design in 1836, though the vehicles continued to be called "hansoms". An account by Chapman's son was published in 1882 in Notes and Queries, and emphasized that the cab then in general use was "in all essential features" his father's invention.

English journalist and editor William Beatty-Kingston lamented in the preface to his book My "Hansom" lays, original verses, imitations, and present paraphrases that he was obliged to travel at night in a hansom cab for 40 minutes daily for three years. He described the trips, "the rattling and jolting of a cab render sleep [...] impossible. Neither can he, with any appreciable comfort or profit to himself, read by fitful gleams of gaslight, such as are intermittently shed upon him by the London street-lamp." Deeming the trips unconstructive, he occupied the time by constructing verse in his head and memorized them, to write them down when he arrived at his destination.

=== United Kingdom ===
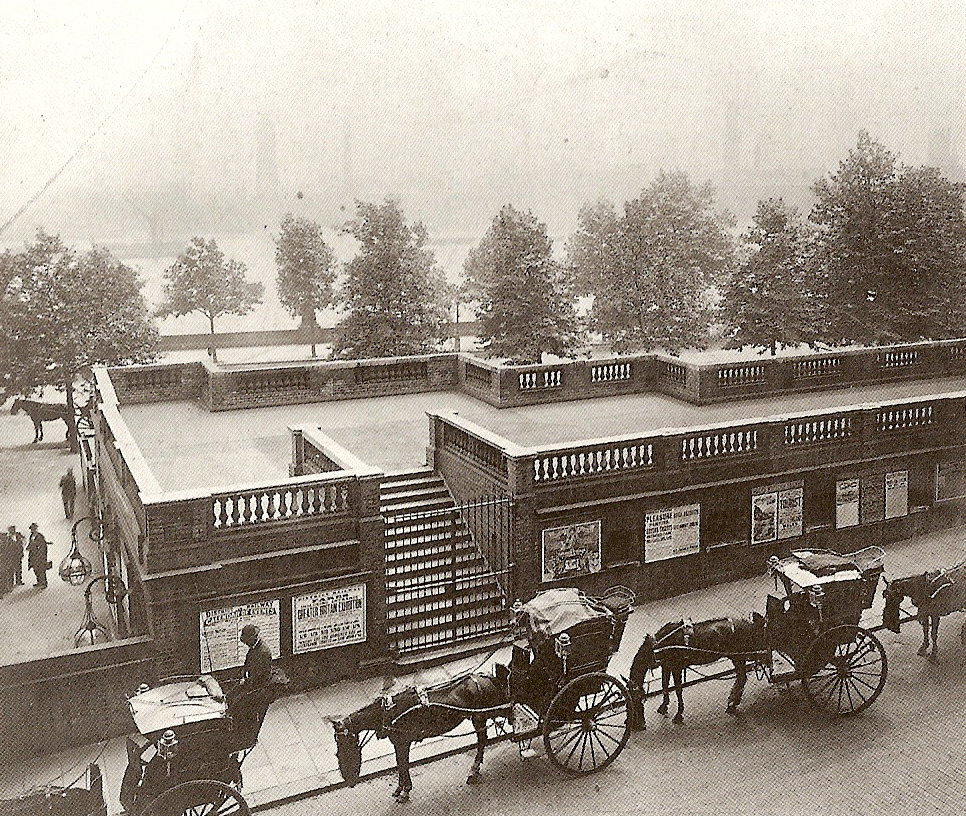
London, 1899

Two English peers who owned cab companies, Lord Shrewsbury and Lord Lonsdale, raised the standards of all Hansom cabs in London when they purchased upgraded cabs made by Forder, complete with brass fittings, quiet-running rubber tires, and luxuriously fitted interiors. Their horses were thoroughbreds in polished harnesses. These flashier Hansoms were sometimes referred to as "Gondolas of London" or "gondolas of the streets".

The cabs were widely used in the United Kingdom until 1908 when Taximeter Cars (petrol cabs) started to be introduced and were rapidly accepted; by the early 1920s horse-drawn cabs had largely been superseded by motor vehicles. The last licence for a horse-drawn cab in London was relinquished in 1947.

=== United States ===
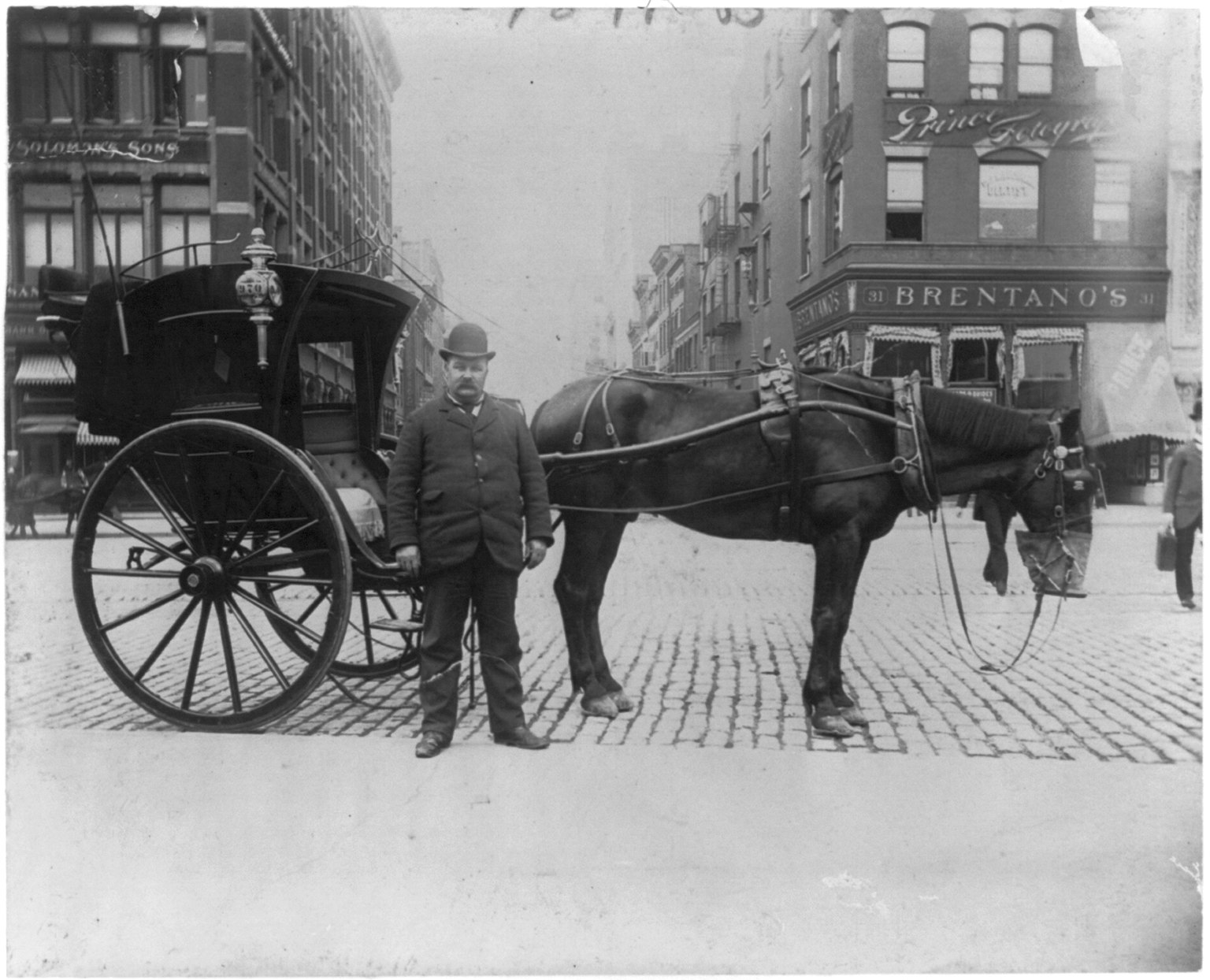
New York City, 1896

The Hansom Cab Company was established in May 1869 to provide transportation in New York City and Brooklyn. The business was located at 133 Water Street, Brooklyn; Duncan, Sherman & Company handled the books of subscription (initial offers of stock to capitalize a new company). The enterprise was organized by Ed W. Brandon who became its president. Two orders for a fleet of cabs were sent to carriage makers in New York City. Fares were to be charged either by distance or time: $0.30 for a single person per mile, or portion thereof, and $0.40 for two people. By time, $0.75 for one person for an hour or portion thereof, $1.00 for two persons.

== Modern usage ==
Hansom cabs remain in active use as props in period dramas, especially those set in Victorian or Edwardian eras. Film production companies can rent replicas or restored original vehicles.

A restored hansom cab once owned by Alfred Gwynne Vanderbilt is on display at the Remington Carriage Museum in Alberta, Canada. There is another surviving example, owned and operated by the Sherlock Holmes Museum in London; in common with other horse-drawn vehicles it is not permitted to enter any of the Royal Parks. Hinckley and Bosworth Borough Council, Leicestershire, also have a restored Hansom cab. The Smithsonian Institution's National Museum of American History has a hansom cab made by D.P. Nichols of New York (circa 1900) in its collections.

== In popular culture ==
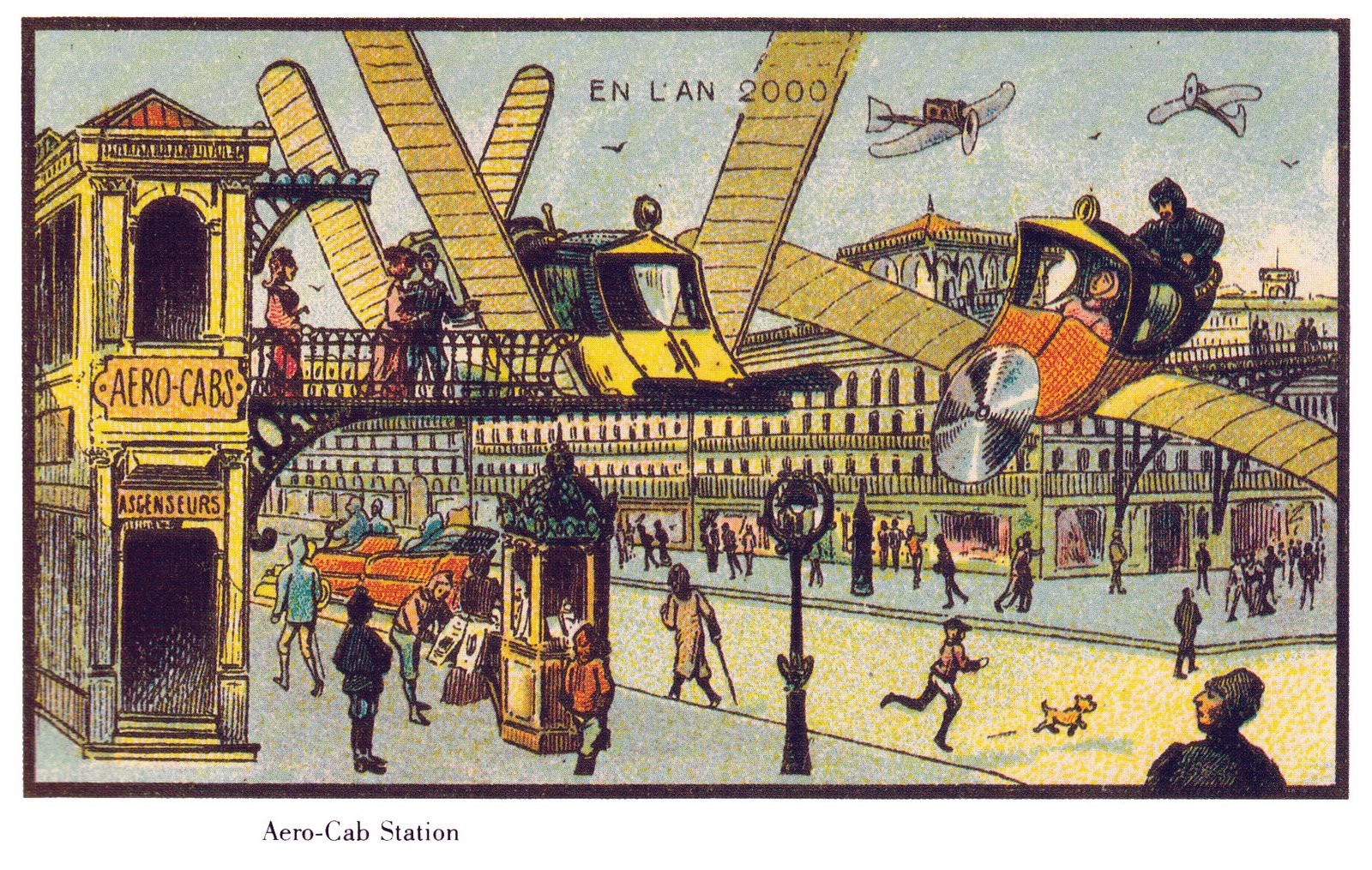
Air cabs - hansom cabs of the (then) future, depicted in En L'An 2000 illustrated by Jean-Marc Côté

- The 1886 novel The Mystery of a Hansom Cab by Fergus Hume is a detective story about a murder set in a hansom cab in post-Victorian gold rush Australia. The book became an international bestseller, selling over one million copies, and has been adapted for film and television six times.

== See also ==
- Cabmen's Shelter Fund
- Hackney carriage § Horse-drawn era
- Driving (horse) – Use of horses to pull vehicles or equipment
