= James Hume (superintendent) =

Asylum superintendent

James Hume (27 February 1823 – 28 August 1896) was a New Zealand asylum superintendent and one of the founders of the asylum Ashburn Hall near Dunedin.

== Life ==
Hume was born in Glasgow, Lanarkshire, Scotland on 27 February 1823. He worked at the Gartnavel Asylum in Glasgow and the Worcester County Asylum before emigrating to Dunedin in 1863. The same year Hume's son William was admitted to the Dunedin Lunatic Asylum. In 1864 Hume became superintendent of the asylum, with his wife Mary as matron.

Hume's position at the Dunedin Asylum was downgraded in 1882 when superintendents of asylums were required to be doctors. In October that year he and Edward William Alexander founded Ashburn Hall, the first private asylum. He was the non-medical superintendent until 1896 while Alexander was the medical officer. The medical and non-medical model of managing the asylum was similar to Hume's experience of Scottish asylums. The asylum's patients were largely middle-class who had to be able to pay for their care; Hume and Alexander believed that those of better class should not have to mix with the 'insane poor' with insanity largely attributed to the poor. Hume's model of care at Ashburn Hall was based on his experience of working in Scotland and England and was founded in methods of moral management. Patients who could pay for them received better facilities and privileges. Hume was superintendent at Ashburn until his death.

== Family ==
Hume and his wife Mary, who died in 1867, had two sons and three daughters. One son, Fergus Hume became a novelist.

== Death and legacy ==
Hume died at Ashburn Hall on 28 August 1896. Portraits of James and Mary Hume by John Irvine are held in the Toitū Otago Settlers Museum. The James Hume Bequest funds research and teaching initiatives in psychiatry at the University of Otago.
