= The Mystery of a Hansom Cab (novel) =

Australian mystery novel by Fergus Hum

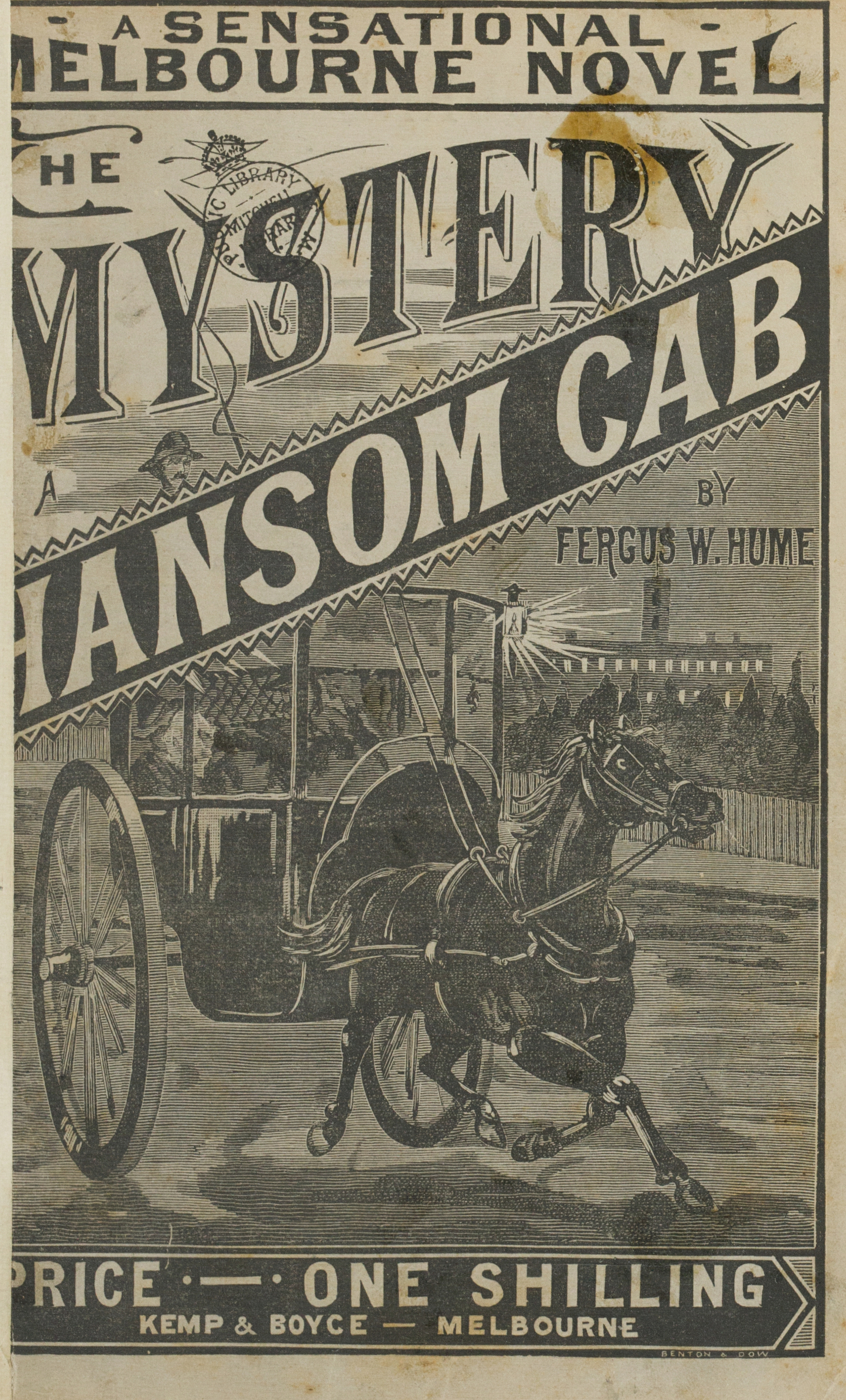
- Cover art for 'The mystery of a hansom cab', Kemp and Boyce, Melbourne, 1887 (attrib)
- Author: Fergus Hume
- Language: English
- Subject: Mystery
- Genre: Fiction
- Publisher: Fergus Hume
- Publication date: 1886
- Publication place: New Zealand
- Pages: 164
- OCLC: 8476357
- LC Class: LCCN ca08-675
- Followed by: Professor Brankel's Secret

The Mystery of a Hansom Cab is a mystery novel by the British writer Fergus Hume. The book was first published in Australia in 1886. Set in Melbourne, the story focuses on the investigation of a homicide involving a body discovered in a hansom cab, as well as an exploration into the social class divide in the city. The book was successful in Australia, selling 100,000 copies in the first two print runs. It was then published in Britain and the United States, and went on to sell over half a million copies worldwide, outselling the first of Arthur Conan Doyle's Sherlock Holmes novels, A Study in Scarlet (1887).

The Mystery of a Hansom Cab received praise in works including A Companion to Crime Fiction, A History of the Book in Australia 1891–1945, and A History of Victoria, and was featured in the book Vintage Mystery and Detective Stories. A parody version was published in 1888, and film adaptations were produced in 1911, 1915 and 1925. The story was adapted into a BBC Radio serial in 1958, a stage play in 1990, a radio promotion in 1991 and a telemovie in 2012.

== Author ==
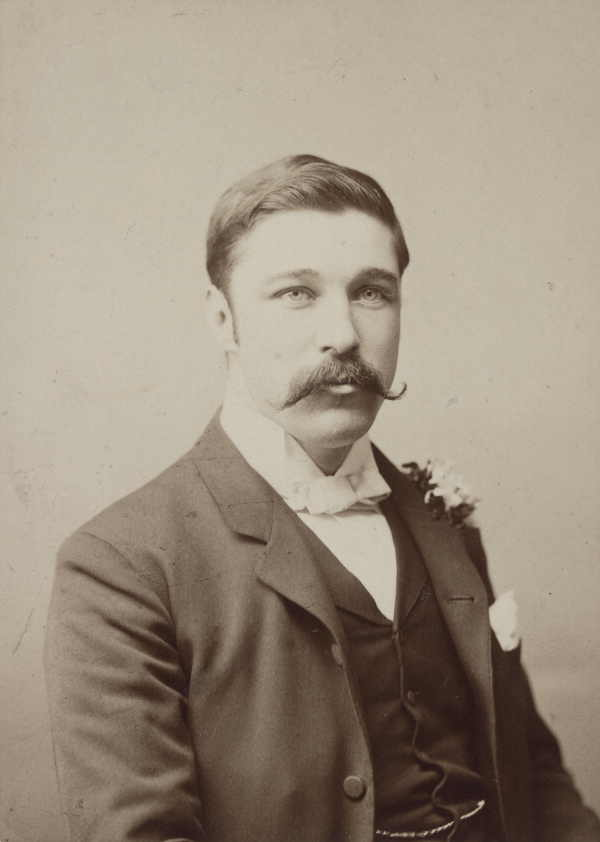
Fergus Hume c. 1882

Fergus Hume was born in the UK. When he was six months old his parents emigrated with him to New Zealand. At 25 he moved to Melbourne where he lived for three years. He then departed for the UK where he lived for the rest of his life. He had some minor success in the UK as a playwright.

Hume was working as a barrister's clerk in Melbourne at the time of the book's first publication. He went on to become a prolific author, and wrote more than 130 novels in fiction subjects including adventure and science fiction.

== Plot ==
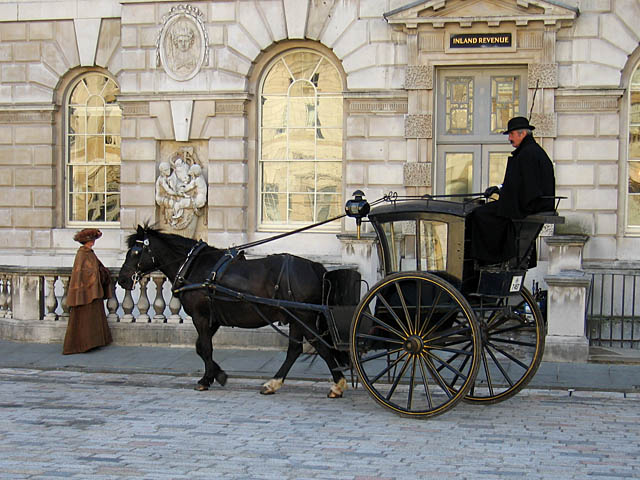
A Hansom cab

The Mystery of a Hansom Cab takes place in Melbourne, Australia, and involves an investigation into a homicide, after a corpse is discovered in the early hours, in a hansom cab. Melbourne plays a significant role in the plot and, as the author describes, "Over all the great city hung a cloud of smoke like a pall." The killer's identity is not as significant a revelation in the story as are the roles of the influential and secretive Frettlby family, and their secret: they have a daughter living on the streets, and the woman everyone assumes is their daughter is illegitimate. The class divide between Melbourne's wealthy and less fortunate is addressed throughout the plot.

The protagonist in the novel is a policeman named Detective Gorby, who is given the task of solving the murder. As Hume describes the character's investigative skills, "He looked keenly round the room, and his estimate of the dead man's character was formed at once." The author commented in a later introduction, "All of the scenes in the book, especially the slums, are described from personal observation; and I passed a great many nights in Little Bourke Street, gathering material". At this time, the street was notorious as a place frequented by prostitutes and criminals.

== Publication history ==
The Mystery of a Hansom Cab was first published in Melbourne in 1886 and in Britain in 1887 (the author self-published the first edition) and in the United States in 1888, by George Munro. Hume wrote an introduction to a revised edition published in 1898, and later publications have included those by the publishers Arno in 1976, and by Dover in 1982, and a new Australian edition with an introduction by Simon Caterson, in 1999 by The Text Publishing Company, which has been reprinted several times.

== Reception ==
=== Sales ===
"A Concise History of Australia" notes that the book became an international bestseller. A Companion to Australian Literature since 1900 noted The Mystery of a Hansom Cab provided Australia with its first international bestseller. and Vintage Mystery and Detective Stories characterized the book as the best-selling detective novel of the 19th century. In Australia, the book sold 25,000 copies in its first print run, and 100,000 copies in its first two print runs. In Britain, in its first six months after publication, 300,000 copies were sold, and, in 1888, sales continued in thousands in Britain each week. According to A Gregarious Culture (2001), "sales of The Mystery of a Hansom Cab, published in 1886, would reach astronomical figures". Franklin, Roe & Bettison (2001) Over 500,000 copies were sold in Britain, by the publishing company Jarrold. In the United States, an additional 500,000 copies were sold.

The author did not benefit from the sales of the work, as he had sold his rights to it for £50. A Gregarious Culture identifies "the only known [complete] copy of the first edition" of the book as "a treasure" of the Mitchell Library at State Library of New South Wales. Illustrated London News reported in 1888 on the popularity of the book, "Persons were found everywhere eagerly devouring the realistic sensational tale of Melbourne social life. Whether travelling by road, rail or river the unpretending little volume was ever present in some companion's or stranger's hands." The book outsold the worldwide 1887 publication of the Sherlock Holmes novel A Study in Scarlet by Arthur Conan Doyle.

=== Reviews ===
"The most spectacular reimagining of the sensation novel"

— A Companion to Crime Fiction
- Christopher Pittard, in an essay for Charles J. Rzepka and Lee Horsley's A Companion to Crime Fiction (2010), called The Mystery of a Hansom Cab "The most spectacular reimagining of the sensation novel, and a crucial point in the genre's transformation into detective fiction".Rzepka & Horsley (2010).
- A History of the Book in Australia 1891–1945 (2001) described the book as "a lively and engaging crime novel which used its Melbourne setting to considerable effect". Lyons & Arnold (2001).
- Geoffrey Blainey wrote in A History of Victoria, The Mystery of a Hansom Cab "did more than any book to give the outside world a picture of Melbourne of the late 1880s".Blainey (2007)
- David Stuart Davies featured the work in his book Vintage Mystery and Detective Stories, writing, "The author was determined to make a fortune by creating a story 'containing a mystery, a murder, and a description of low life in Melbourne'. He succeeded. Like a rich plum in our vintage mystery pudding we include the whole novel in this collection."Davies (2006)

== Adaptations ==
A parody edition, titled The Mystery of a Wheelbarrow (1888), is attributed to a W. Humer Ferguson. The same year, it was adapted for the stage by Arthur Law.

The Mystery of a Hansom Cab (1911) is a film produced by Amalgamated Pictures, an Australian adaptation of the book.

In 1915, the book was again adapted into a film with screenplay by Eliot Stannard. Directed by Harold Weston, the film starred the actors Milton Rosmer, Fay Temple, A. V. Bramble, James Dale and Arthur Walcott.

A remake of the 1911 version of the film was produced in 1925, in Australia. Made by Pyramid Pictures, The Mystery of a Hansom Cab cast included Arthur Shirley, Grace Glover, Godfrey Cass, Cora Warner and Isa Crossley.

The Mystery of a Hansom Cab was a 1935 reissue of the 1925 Australian silent film. It was released by Pathescope.

The book was read out on ABC radio in 1954.

A six-part radio serial adaptation was broadcast on the BBC Light Programme from 2 November to 7 December 1958.

The Mystery of a Hansom Cab (1958)
Writer	Michael Hardwick						
Based on the novel by	Fergus Hume						
Production	Audrey Cameron						
Five Thousand Pounds							
A Confession							
A Certificate of Marriage							
The Queen of Little Bourke Street							
Duncan Calton for the Defence							
In the Queen's Name!							
Episodes		1	2	3	4	5	6
Oliver Whyte; Brown, club porter Judge	Leigh Crutchley	1	2	3			
Cabby; Felix Rolleston	John Hollis	1	2	3			6
Passer-by	Joseph Shaw	1					
Constable other parts played by	John Scott	1	2	3			
Coroner	Frederick Treves	1					
Dr. Chinston	John Graham	1				5	6
Detective Sam Gorby	Russell Napier	1	2	3		5	6
Sergeant Joseph	John Cazabon	1		3		5	6
Mrs Hableton; Slum woman	Shirley Cameron	1	2				
Roger Moreland	Bruce Stewart	1		3			6
Mrs Sampson	Brenda Dunrich	1	2		4	5	
Madge Frettlby	Gwenda Wilson	1	2	3	4	5	
Brian Fitzgerald	Allan McClelland	1	2	3	4	5	6
Mark Frettlby	Harold Young	1	2	3	4		
Duncan Calton	Frank Duncan		2	3	4	5	6
Ma Guttersnipe	Gwen Day Burroughs		2	3	4		
Graham, Calton's clerk	John Bennett		2	3			6
Crown Prosecutor; Mr Raphael, a chemist	Leon Peers			3		5	6
George Nicholas	Gabriel Woolf			3			
Sal Rawlins	Paddy Turner			3		5	
A boy	Seamus Grant			3			
other parts played by	Sheila Grant	1					
other parts played by	members of the cast	1		3			

The Melbourne television station GTV-9 produced a version of the play in 1962, adapted by Barry Pree, as part of The General Motors Hour.

Michael Rodger adapted the story as a stage play in 1990 and a radio promotion in 1991 by Queensland Performing Arts Trust.

Burberry Entertainment, in association with the Australian Broadcasting Corporation, produced a telemovie adaptation which was premiered on 28 October 2012 and stars John Waters, Oliver Ackland, Helen Morse and Jessica De Gouw.

A German translation of the novel appeared in 1895 under the title "Das Geheimnis eines Fiakers", shifting the setting of the story from Melbourne to Vienna and also changing the names of the characters. This adaptation was re-published in a modernized version by Hainer Plaul in the German Democratic Republic in 1984 under the title "Das Geheimnnis des Fiakers".

== See also ==
- Crime fiction
- Detective fiction
- Giallo
- List of crime writers
- Mystery fiction
- Whodunit

== Sources ==
1. Diaz, Amanda (30 Apr 2012). "Filming commences on ABC telemovie The Mystery of a Hansom Cab". Archived from the original on 11 Jan 2020.
  The Mystery of a Hansom Cab (2012 TV Movie) at IMDb
2. Birns, Nicholas; McNeer, Rebecca (2007). A Companion to Australian Literature since 1900. Camden. pp. 391–393. ISBN 978-1571133496.
3. Blainey, Geoffrey (2007). A History of Victoria. CUP. p. 72. ISBN 978-0521869775.
4. Brown-May, Andrew (1998). Melbourne street life: the itinerary of our days. Australian Scholarly/Arcadia and Museum Victoria. p. 28. ISBN 978-1875606467.
5. Davies, David Stuart (2006). Vintage Mystery and Detective Stories. Wordsworth. pp. 15–17, 1059, 1063. ISBN 978-1840220650.
6. Franklin, Miles; Roe, Jill; Bettison, Margaret (2001). A Gregarious Culture: Topical Writings of Miles Franklin. UQP. pp. 227–230. ISBN 0702232378.
7. Hume, Fergus (2013). The Mystery of a Hansom Cab. Introduction: Simon Caterson. Text Publishing. ISBN 978-1921922220.
8. "The Mystery of a Hansom Cab". Kinematograph Weekly Yearbook. Kinematograph Publications: 91, 96. 1935.
9. Lyons, Martyn; Arnold, John (2001). A History of the Book in Australia 1891–1945: A National Culture in a Colonised Market. UQP. pp. 241–243. ISBN 978-0702232343.
10. Macintyre, Stuart (2009). A Concise History of Australia (3rd ed.). CUP. pp. 111–113. ISBN 978-0521516082.
11. Parrinder, Patrick; Gasiorek, Andrzej, eds. (2011). The Oxford History of the Novel in English. Vol. 4: The Reinvention of the British and Irish Novel 1880–1940. OUP. pp. 213–216. ISBN 978-0199559336.
12. Pierce, Peter (2009). The Cambridge History of Australian Literature. CUP. pp. 114, 274. ISBN 978-0521881654.
13. Plarr, Victor (1899). "Law, William Arthur". Men and Women of the Time: A Dictionary of Contemporaries (15th ed.). Routledge. p. 626. OCLC 457880067.
14. Reade, Eric (1980). History and Heartburn: The Saga of Australian Film, 1896–1978. Fairleigh Dickinson UP. p. 44. ISBN 978-0838630822.
15. Rzepka, Charles J; Horsley, Lee (2010). A Companion to Crime Fiction. Wiley-Blackwell. pp. 107–109. ISBN 978-1405167659.
16. "Author, 23, In Rare Double". The Age. Melbourne. 17 Aug 1961. p. TV-Radio Guide 2.
17. Lincoln, W J (9 Feb 1916). "Picture Profiles in the Olden Days | Random Reminiscences". The Winner. Melbourne. p. 11 – via National Library of Australia.
18. Young, R G (2010). The Encyclopedia of Fantastic Film. Applause. p. 434. ISBN 978-1557832696.
