= Night (2007 film) =

- Directed by: Lawrence Johnston
- Produced by: Lizzette Atkins; Lawrence Johnston
- Cinematography: Laurie McInnes
- Edited by: Bill Murphy
- Music by: Cezary Skubiszewski
- Release dates: 8 November 2007 (Brisbane Film Festival); 7 February 2008 (Australia)
- Running time: 82 min.
- Country: Australia
- Language: English
- Budget: ~$2 million

Night is a 2007 Australian documentary film about the night, co-produced and directed by Lawrence Johnston. The film features scenes of Australia at night, including Sydney, Melbourne, Brisbane and a moonrise over Uluru, as various Australians are interviewed about their emotional connections and life experiences relating to the night time.

== Critical response ==
Leigh Paatsch from Herald Sun gave the film three and a half out of five stars saying that while "the whole package is occasionally too pretentious and pretty for its own good" there were "moments of sublime contemplation captured throughout Night that are rarely (if ever) felt in an Australian film."

The Sunday Age's Tom Ryan also gave the film three and a half out of five stars. He writes "If Johnston's ambitious work sometimes gets a bit pompous, it also displays, along with the striking cinematography, a keen anthropological instinct and a real intelligence." The Courier Mail's Des Partridge gave it three out of five stars closing his review by saying "At only 82 minutes including credits, Night scrapes in as a feature, and the repetitive film seems longer."

Writing in the Daily Telegraph, Tracey Prisk gave it three out of five stars, calling it a "visual fest" but stating "it's hard to imagine that Night will have such resonance on the big screen." Simon Weaving from the Canberra Times notes that "the film as a whole is a flawed curiosity rather than a stunning piece."

== Accolades ==
Cezary Skubiszewski's soundtrack won the 2008 Screen Music Award for Best Music for a Documentary and was nominated for the 2008 AIRA Award for Best Original Soundtrack/Cast/Show Album and the 2009 International Film Music Critics Award for Best Original Score for a Documentary Film.

== Follow-up ==
In 2015, Johnston released a spiritual sequel to Night entitled Neon. That film covers the history of neon lights around the world, presenting hypnotic footage mixed with interviews in a similar fashion.
