= The Mystery of a Hansom Cab (1935 film) =

1925 film re-issued in 1935

The Mystery of a Hansom Cab is a re-issue in 1935 of the 1925 Australian silent film of the same name based on the 1886 novel The Mystery of a Hansom Cab by Fergus Hume. It was released by Pathescope.
