= Carlton Draught =

Australian beer

- Manufacturer: Carlton & United Breweries
- Introduced: 1864
- Alcohol by volume: 4.6%
- Style: Lager
- Website: carltondraught.com.au

Carlton Draught (Australian English: [dɹɑːft]) is a 4.6% (abv) beer made in Australia by Carlton & United Breweries, a subsidiary of Asahi Breweries.

== Description ==
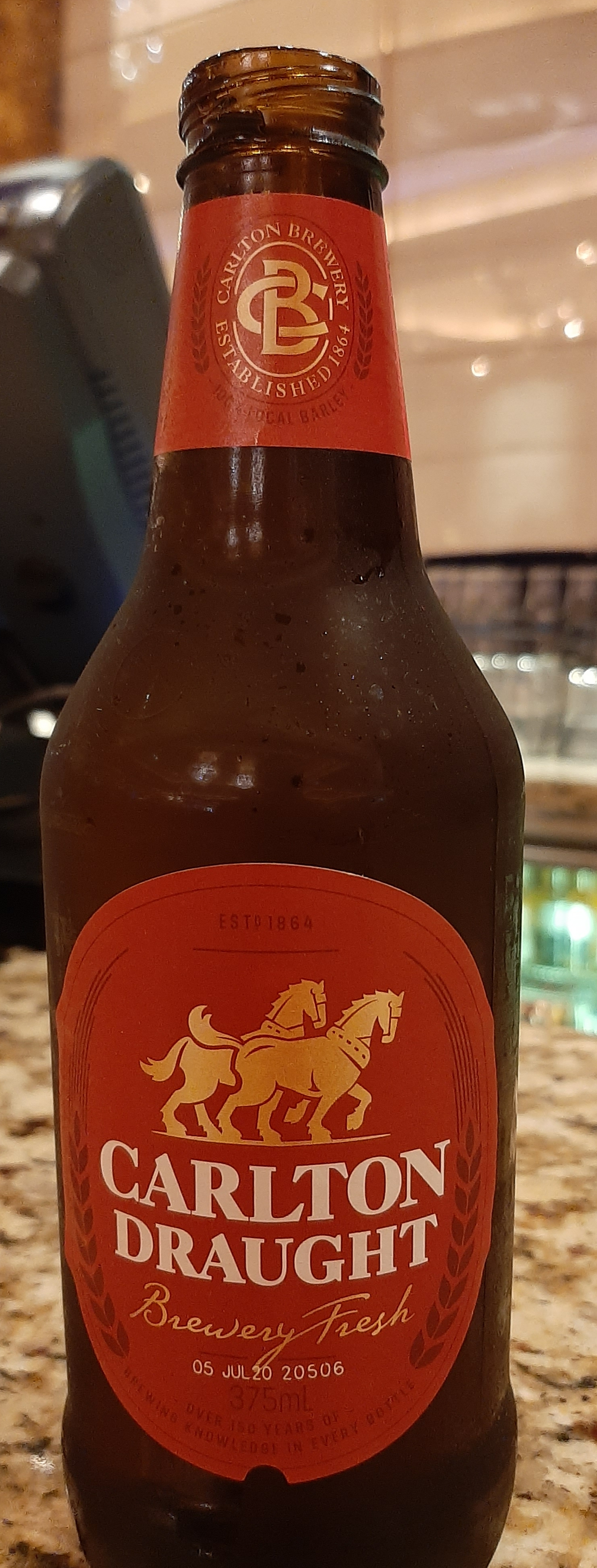
Carlton Draught (bottle 375mL)

Carlton Draught is a draught Australian lager which is sold on tap Australia-wide, including its home state of Victoria, and is currently the fourth-most popular beer brand in Australia. It is also sold pre-packaged, Carlton Draught comes in 375 ml "stubbie" and 750 ml "longneck" bottles and 375 ml cans.

The formulation of Carlton Draught was changed slightly in 2003 to reduce the alcohol content from 5.0% to 4.6% in response to an increase in alcohol taxes by the federal government. The logo was also changed and a new advertising campaign was introduced to target a wider market. Featuring quirky, comical advertisements and billboards, the beer was promoted as simply being "made from beer". Carlton Draught, like most Australian lagers, is made using a wortstream brewing process, and it uses a portion of cane sugar to thin out the body of the beer, apparently due to drinkers' preferences. Some drinkers, including prominent beer critic Rhysie's Beer Reviews, have called for a review of the brewing process.

== Advertising ==
The Carlton Draught: Big Ad used viral marketing techniques before being released on television.

A second comical viral campaign was initiated in September 2006 entitled Flash Beer. It is focused on a character named Kevin Kavendish (played by Aaron Bertram) applying for a job as a brewer in Carlton Draught. At first, he is rejected, so he copies a dance sequence in the movie Flashdance to the song "Flashdance... What a Feeling" and is accepted. The ad was parodied on The Chaser's War on Everything.

Carlton Draught has been a sponsor of the Australian Football League since 1877 (except for 1991 and 2009) and used to be the main sponsor but was superseded by Toyota. It is the official beer of the AFL.

== See also ==
- List of breweries in Australia
