= Carlton Draught: Big Ad =

Australian TV advertisement for Carlton Draught pale lager

Carlton Draught: Big Ad is an Australian television advertisement for Carlton Draught pale lager. It was created by George Patterson and Partners (Young & Rubicam) of Melbourne, Australia. The agency used viral marketing techniques to promote the advertisement before it was broadcast on television. The ad premiered on Australian television on August 7, 2005.

== Content ==
Two choirs, one clad in maroon choir uniforms and the other in yellow choir uniforms (with some others wearing black, blue and white), charge each other while singing new lyrics to the classic melody tune of "O Fortuna" from Carl Orff's Carmina Burana. Viewed from the air, one choir forms the shape of Carlton Draught beer glass and the other forms the shape of a human body with choir singers in white, blue & black to form the figure's eyes & teeth with additional choir singers in white to form the beer's head. The figure of the glass is then lifted to the mouth of the human figure and the audience sees the "beer"—rushing, ecstatically leaping, yellow-clad choir singers—flowing into the stomach of the large body. The view then zooms into the crowd of choir singers (now all raising their Carlton Draught beer) to focus on one man's glass. A caption then appears below it saying, "Made from Beer", and the commercial fades out.

The lyrics to the ad are as follows:

It's a big ad. Very big ad. It's a big ad we're in. It's a big ad. My God it's big! Can't believe how big it is! It's a big ad! For Carlton Draught! It's just so freaking HUGE! It's a big ad! Expensive ad! This ad better sell some bloo-oo-oo-oody beer!

Big Ad parodies the visual style of battle sequences in such films as Peter Jackson's Lord of the Rings trilogy with sweeping, larger-than-life panoramas of rugged mountain terrain. It is also reminiscent of the grandiose commercials pioneered by the likes of Qantas and British Airways.

== Viral marketing ==
The company decided to use a viral campaign because of the distracting environment in which television is viewed and the fragmented audiences of traditional media. (Lee, 2005, p. 29) Two weeks prior to being broadcast on television, the advertisement was streamed on the Internet. Within 24 hours after release, the "Big Ad" had been downloaded 162,000 times (Frilingos, 2005, p. 8). Within two weeks, it had been seen by over one million viewers in 132 countries (Lees, 2005). This campaign was widely covered in the press. The viral release of the "Big Ad" was so successful that the company reduced its television media budget so as not to overexpose the advertisement. (Lee, 2005, p. 29)

== Awards ==
The advertisement has since received over 30 awards globally, including a prestigious Gold Lion award at the 53rd Cannes Lions International Advertising Festival in 2006.

== Technical acknowledgements ==
Agency: George Patterson and Partners, Melbourne

Creative Director: James McGrath
Art Director: Grant Rutherford
Writer: Ant Keogh
Producer: Pip Heming
Group Communications Director: Paul McMillan

Production: Plaza Films

Director: Paul Middleditch
Executive Producer: Peter Masterton
DOP: Andrew Lesnie (Lord of the Rings: The Fellowship of the Ring)

Post- Production: Animal Logic

VFX Supervisor: Andrew Jackson
Senior Compositor: Angus Wilson
VFX Producer: Caroline Renshaw

Editor: Peter Whitmore - Winning Post Productions
Music: Cezary Skubiszewski

Location: Queenstown, New Zealand
Cast: 300 locals (who played poker with peas during breaks)

To create large (tens of thousands of people) crowds for the ad MASSIVE software with semi-independent AI actors from Weta Digital was used.
