= Fergus Hume =

English novelist (1859-1932)

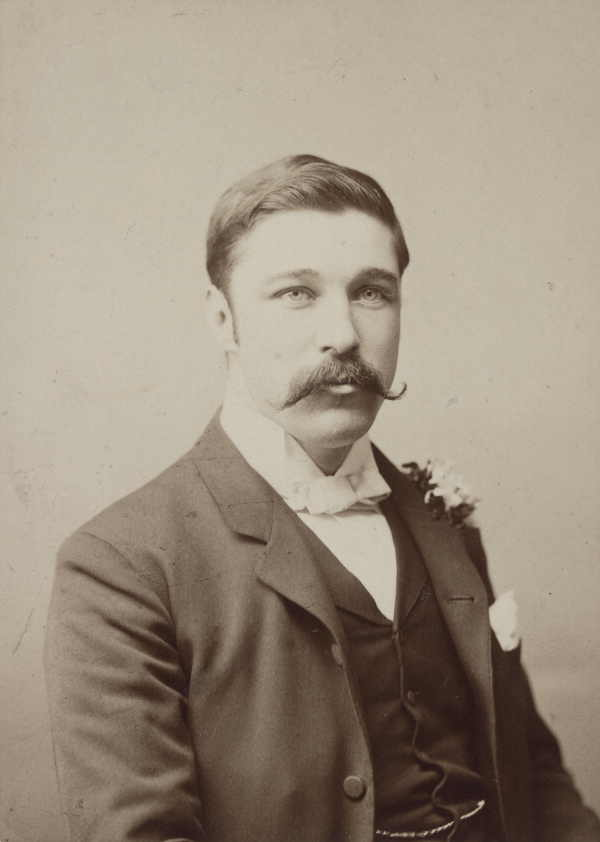
- Born: 8 July 1859
- Died: 12 July 1932
- Occupation: Writer

Ferguson Wright Hume (8 July 1859 – 12 July 1932), known as Fergus Hume, was a prolific English novelist, known for his detective fiction, thrillers and mysteries.

== Early life ==
Hume was born in Powick, Worcestershire, England, the second son of James Hume, a Scot and clerk and steward at the County Pauper and Lunatic Asylum there. In 1863 the family emigrated to Dunedin, New Zealand, where his father founded the asylum Ashburn Hall. He was educated at Otago Boys' High School and studied law at the University of Otago. He was admitted to the New Zealand bar in 1885. Shortly after graduation Hume relocated to Melbourne, Australia, where he obtained a job as a barristers' clerk.

== Rise to fame ==
Hume first came to attention after a play he had written, entitled The Bigamist was stolen by a rogue called Calthorpe, and presented by him as his own work under the title The Mormon.

The Mystery of a Hansom Cab was set in Melbourne, with descriptions of poor urban life based on his knowledge of Little Bourke Street. It was self-published in 1886 and became a great success. Because he sold the British and American rights for 50 pounds, however, he reaped little of the potential financial benefit. It became the best-selling mystery novel of the Victorian era; in 1990 John Sutherland called it the "most sensationally popular crime and detective novel of the century". This novel inspired Arthur Conan Doyle to write A Study in Scarlet, which introduced the fictional consulting detective Sherlock Holmes. Doyle remarked, "Hansom Cab was a slight tale, mostly sold by 'puffing'." It was also brought to the stage.

After the success of his first novel and the publication of another, Professor Brankel's Secret (c. 1886), Hume returned to England in 1888. His third novel, Madame Midas, was based on the life of the mine and newspaper owner Alice Ann Cornwell. After this book became a play (Note: Hume and British actor Phil Beck collaborated on the stage version, in which Beck played the lead role, subsequently took his own life.) her estranged husband, John Whiteman, sued over its content.

== Personal life ==
Hume settled back in England, first in London, but after a few years in Thundersley, Essex at Church Cottage, probably at the invitation of the Reverend Thomas Noon Talfourd Major. Hume lived in Thundersley for thirty years, publishing in excess of 130 novels, plus several collections – most of them mystery stories, though he never recaptured the success of his first novel. He also wrote lyrics to songs composed by his brother-in-law, Charles Willeby, and book reviews for literary journals including The Bookman.

The 1911 census lists him as ‘author’, aged 51, and living at Church Cottage, Thundersley, which consisted of six rooms. He had a housekeeper, Ada Louise Peck, a widow of 69. He regularly travelled to Italy, France, Switzerland and other European countries.

When the Rev Talfourd Major died in 1915, Hume had to leave Church Cottage. He moved to ‘Rosemary Cottage’, 34 Grandview Road, Thundersley, where he lived with John Joseph Melville and his wife. Melville was a metallurgical chemist by profession, with a special study of alchemy.

Hume is now presumed by scholars to have been homosexual. Transgressive themes imbue his work; he lived for years with actor Philip Beck; maintained close friendships with a number of men who are suspected and known to have been homosexual, including the Rev. Talfourd Major; and was blackmailed by Antonio Bollars, a black Shakespearean actor who was later imprisoned for indecent assault on a male. Bollars was part of a gang who included fellow actor Gordon Lawrence, who was arrested in drag at the 1888 International Exhibition.

Hume was reputed to be deeply religious and intensely private and known to avoid publicity, but in his later years he lectured at young people's clubs and debating societies. He died at Thundersley on 12 July 1932 and lies in an unmarked grave next to an actress and the Rev Maley. All he left in his will were some small items, like a horse blanket and a pipe. His estate was valued at £201.

== Works ==
=== Individual works ===
==== Plays ====
- The Bigamist (1887). Hume gave the script to a fraudster, Calthorpe Mallaby, who re-titled the play The Mormon, and presented it under his own name at the Vaudeville Theatre in 1887
- The Mystery of a Hansom Cab, with Arthur Law (1888)
- Madame Midas, the Gold Queen, with Philip Beck (1888)
- Indiscretion (1889)
- In Love and War (1889)
- The Fool of the Family (1900)

==== Novels ====
- The Mystery of a Hansom Cab (1886)
- Professor Brankel's Secret (1886)
- Madame Midas (1888)
- The Girl from Malta (1889)
- The Piccadilly Puzzle (1889)
- The Gentleman Who Vanished: A Psychological Phantasy (1890); aka The Man Who Vanished
- Miss Mephistopheles (1890); aka Tracked by Fate
- The Man with a Secret (1890)
- Whom God Hath Joined (1891)
- The Year of Miracle: A Tale of the Year One Thousand Nine Hundred (1891)
- A Creature of the Night (1891)
- Monsieur Judas (1891)
- When I Lived in Bohemia: Papers Selected from the Portfolio of Peter ---, Esq (1891)
- Whom God Hath Joined (1891)
- The Black Carnation (1892)
- Aladdin in London (1892)
- The Fever of Life (1892)
- The Island of Fantasy (1892)
- The Man with a Secret (1892)
- The Chinese Jar (1893)
- The Harlequin Opal (1893)
- The Nameless City: A Rommany Romance (1893), under the name Stephen Grail, at least in the US
- A Speck of the Motley (1893)
- The Lone Inn (1894)
- The Mystery of Landy Court (1894); aka From Thief to Detective
- The Best of Her Sex (1894)
- The Gates of Dawn (1894)
- A Midnight Mystery (1894)
- The Crime of Liza Jane (1895)
- The White Prior (1895)
- The Masquerade Mystery (1895) aka The Third Volume
- The Expedition of Captain Flick (1896)
- The Carbuncle Clue (1896)
- A Marriage Mystery (1896)
- Tracked by a Tattoo (1896)
- Claude Duval of Ninety-Five (1897)
- The Tombstone Treasure (1897)
- The Clock Struck One (1898)
- The Rainbow Feather (1898)
- The Devil-Stick (1898); aka For the Defense (US title)
- Lady Jezebel (1898)
- The Red-Headed Man (1899)
- The Silent House in Pimlico (1899)
- The Indian Bangle (1899)
- The Crimson Cryptogram (1900)
- Shylock of the River (1900)
- The Vanishing of Tera (1900)
- The Bishop's Secret (1900); aka Bishop Pendle
- The Lady from Nowhere (1900)
- A Traitor in London (1900)
- The Millionaire Mystery (1901)
- The Crime of the Crystal (1901)
- The Golden Wang-Ho (1901); aka The Secret of the Chinese Jar
- The Mother of Emeralds (1901)
- A Woman's Burden (1901)
- The Pagan's Cup (1902)
- The Turnpike House (1902)
- Woman: The Sphinx (1902)
- A Coin of Edward VII (1903)
- The Jade Eye (1903)
- The Silver Bullet (1903)
- The Yellow Holly (1903)
- The Guilty House (1903)
- The Miser's Will (1903)
- The Mandarin's Fan (1904)
- The Wheeling Light (1904)
- The Red Window (1904)
- The Lonely Church (1904)
- The Elusive Dwarf (1904)
- The White Room (1904)
- The Secret Passage (1905)
- Lady Jim of Curzon Street (1905)
- The Opal Serpent (1905)
- The Fatal Song (1905)
- The Scarlet Bat (1905)
- The Wooden Hand (1905)
- The Mystery of the Shadow (1906)
- The Black Patch (1906)
- Jonah's Luck (1906)
- The Purple Fern (1907)
- The Yellow Hunchback (1907)
- The Amethyst Cross (1908)
- Flies in the Web (1908)
- The Sealed Message (1908)
- The Green Mummy (1908)
- The Crowned Skull (1908)
- The Mystery of a Motor Cab (1908)
- The Sacred Herb (1908)
- The Devil's Ace (1909)
- The Solitary Farm (1909)
- The Top Dog (1909)
- The Disappearing Eye (1909)
- The Peacock of Jewels (1910)
- The Lonely Subaltern (1910)
- The Mikado Jewel (1910)
- The Spider (1910)
- The Steel Crown (1911)
- High Water Mark (1911)
- The Jew's House (1911)
- The Pink Shop (1911)
- The Rectory Governess (1911)
- The Mystery Queen (1912)
- The Blue Talisman (1912)
- Red Money (1912)
- Across the Footlights (1912)
- Mother Mandarin (1912)
- A Son of Perdition: An Occult Romance (1912)
- The Curse (1913)
- In Queer Street (1913)
- Seen in the Shadow (1913)
- The Thirteenth Guest (1913)
- The Lost Parchment (1914)
- The 4 PM Express (1914)
- Not Wanted (1914)
- Answered (1915)
- The Caretaker (1915)
- The Red Bicycle (1916)
- The Grey Doctor (1917)
- The Silent Signal (1917)
- Heart of Ice (1918)
- The Black Image (1918)
- Next Door (1918)
- Crazy-Quilt (1919)
- The Master-Mind (1919)
- The Dark Avenue (1920)
- The Other Person (1920)
- The Singing Head (1920)
- The Woman Who Held On (1920)
- Three (1921)
- The Unexpected (1921)
- A Trick of Time (1922)
- The Moth-Woman (1923)
- The Whispering Lane (1924)
- The Caravan Mystery (1926). Originally published as a newspaper serial under the title The Caravan Crime (1921)
- The Last Straw (1932)

=== Collections of works ===
- Chronicles of Faeryland (1892)
- The Dwarf's Chamber: And Other Stories (1896)
- Hagar of the Pawn Shop The Gypsy Detective (1898)
- The Dancer in Red (1906)

== See also ==
- List of crime writers
- Crime fiction
- Detective fiction
- Giallo
- Mystery fiction
- Whodunit

== Notes and references ==
Other sources

- Pauline M. Kirk, 'Hume, Fergusson Wright (Fergus) (1859–1932)', Australian Dictionary of Biography, Volume 4, MUP, 1972, pp. 443–44
- T. J. Binyon Murder Will Out: The Detective in Fiction (Oxford, 1989) ISBN 0-19-219223-X pp. 70–71
- D.C. Wands. "Fergus Hume".
- Lucy Sussex, The Queer Story of Fergus Hume, in: Curtis Evans (ed.) Murder in the Closet: Essays on Queer Clues in Crime Fiction Before Stonewall (McFarland & Co, 2017.)
