= Barristers' clerk =

Manager and administrator in a set of barristers' chambers

A barristers' clerk is a manager and administrator in a set of barristers' chambers. The term originated in England and is also used in some other common law jurisdictions, such as Australia. In Scotland, the equivalent role is advocate's clerk.

There are about 1,200 barristers' clerks in England and Wales. Around 350 are senior clerks. A group of 20 barristers normally employs one senior clerk and one or two junior clerks. More than half the clerks work in London, mainly in and around the four Inns of Court, with the remainder being in other large towns and cities. In the UK, the profession is regulated by the Institute of Barristers' Clerks.

Traditionally referred to as "the Law's Middlemen", clerks possess a unique skill set and fulfill a role in which they are considered to be experts in their own right. Clerking is seen as a career in itself, rather than a stepping stone to becoming a barrister.

Barristers employ clerks to organise their bookings, manage their practices, develop relationships with clients, negotiate fees, and assist with accounting services.

Clerks have detailed knowledge about the barristers on their list. They provide solicitors and others with information about the availability of barristers and advise on the choice of barrister.

In recent years and in line with modernisation of the barristers' profession, an increasing number of barristers no longer employ clerks but manage their fees and time themselves or use modern management structures.

== Typical activities ==
Clerks manage their barristers' time through diary management (e.g. when they have to be in court); clerks negotiate their fees; and clerks advise them on how their careers should be structured (e.g., what kind of law to specialise in, or when to become a King's Counsel). They may receive a percentage of the barristers' fees for this work.

A barristers' clerk is responsible for running the business activities and administration of a barristers' chambers. The role is integral to the success of a set of chambers as a business and as a practice. Barristers' clerks must be familiar with court procedures and etiquette. They will also develop an expertise in the branch of law undertaken by their chambers.

A barristers' clerk requires a combination of commercial acumen, legal knowledge, and strong interpersonal skills. The term "clerk" is historical and does not accurately reflect the co-ordination of workload, marketing, and financial management undertaken.

Barrister's clerks are also responsible for client management, including attending client meetings to set up and forge relationships with individual solicitors and solicitors firms that deal with the work their barristers and chambers specialise in. Sometimes this can mean traveling around the country (and in some cases abroad) to see clients.

=== The Role of a Junior Barristers' Clerk ===
Generally, a junior barristers' clerk acts as an assistant to other senior and more experienced staff, increasingly assuming more responsibility over a period of time, including the allocation of briefs and negotiation of fees. One of the most significant duties that a junior barristers' clerk will undertake is to arrange the diary and general work programme of the barristers.

The junior barristers' clerk is usually the first point of contact between a solicitor seeking the services of a barrister, and the barrister. Junior barristers' clerks need to be consistently professional in their approach and show positive attitudes and behaviours. The barristers' clerk needs to ensure that whichever barrister they put forward has the ability, competence, and time to perform the assignment; so the barristers' clerk needs to be up-to-date with the barrister's diary and commitments.

For a newly appointed barristers’ clerk, relationships with barristers in chambers and instructing solicitors, the court service, and many other outside agencies are paramount. Depending on the size of chambers and the available staff resources, the typical responsibilities of a junior barristers' clerk will include some or all of the following:

- Dealing with incoming and outgoing post
- Collecting and delivering documents
- Maintaining and updating court lists
- Maintaining and filing briefs/instructions
- Communicating with clients, court staff, solicitors, other chambers, and various outside agencies
- Dealing with routine telephone enquiries
- Attending court listing meetings and representing their chambers' interests
- Arranging court listings via the telephone
- Fee billing
- Diary management
- Maintaining the stock of stationery and chambers brochures
- Updating and maintaining chambers library
