= Children's Discovery Museum =

Children's Discovery Museum or similar names may refer to:

== Europe ==
- Discovery Museum (Netherlands)

== Thailand ==
- Children’s Discovery Museum Bangkok 1

== United States ==
(by state, then city)

- Museum of Discovery, Little Rock, Arkansas
- Bay Area Discovery Museum, Fort Baker, Sausalito, California
- Children's Discovery Museum of the Desert (CDMOD), Rancho Mirage, California
- Children's Discovery Museum of San Jose, California
  - Children's Discovery Museum (VTA), a light-rail station next to the museum
- Fort Collins Museum of Discovery, Colorado
- Hawaii Children's Discovery Center, Honolulu, Hawaii
- Kauai Children's Discovery Museum, a defunct museum in Kauai, Hawaii
- Children's Discovery Museum, Normal, Illinois
- Discovery Center Museum, Rockford, Illinois; part of the National Space Grant College and Fellowship Program
- Kansas Children's Discovery Center, Topeka, Kansas
- Maine Discovery Museum, Bangor, Maine
- Port Discovery (museum) or Port Discovery Children's Museum, Baltimore, Maryland
- Discovery Museum (Acton, Massachusetts)
- Garden State Discovery Museum, Cherry Hill, New Jersey
- Discovery Children's Museum, Las Vegas, Nevada
- Boonshoft Museum of Discovery, a children's museum in Dayton, Ohio
- Creative Discovery Museum, Chattanooga, Tennessee
- Discovery Center at Murfree Spring, Murfreesboro, Tennessee
- Children's Discovery Museum, Victoria, Texas
- Virginia Discovery Museum, a children's museum in Charlottesville, Virginia

== See also ==
- Children's Library Discovery Center, Jamaica, Queens, New York
- Children's museum
- Discovery Museum, Newcastle upon Tyne, England
- Hands On Children's Museum, a children's museum in Olympia, Washington
- List of children's museums in the United States, many of which have "Discovery" in the name
