= Leslie P. Hume =

American historian

- Education: Radcliffe College; Stanford University
- Occupations: Historian, philanthropist
- Spouse: George H. Hume
- Relatives: Jaquelin H. Hume (father-in-law); Caroline Howard Hume (mother-in-law); William J. Hume (brother-in-law)

Leslie P. Hume (nee Bryant) is an American historian and philanthropist from San Francisco, California. She has published scholarship about the place of women in the Victorian era as well as women's suffrage societies. She served as President of the Board of Trustees of Stanford University from 2008 to 2012, making her the second woman after Jane Stanford to do so.

== Biography ==
=== Early life ===
Leslie Parker Hume graduated from Radcliffe College in Cambridge, Massachusetts, in 1969, where she received a Bachelor of Arts degree in history. She received a master's degree in 1971 and a PhD in 1979 from Stanford University.

=== Scholarly career ===
She edited a volume about women during the Victorian era in 1981 and wrote a book about women's suffrage societies from 1897 to 1914 in 1982. She also worked as a consultant for the Research Libraries Group in Mountain View, California.

=== Philanthropy ===
She has served on the trustee boards of the San Francisco Foundation, the San Francisco Opera, Summerbridge National, and the Bay Area Discovery Museum. She was a founding member of the Board of Trustees of the San Francisco Day School and served as its president.

She was elected to the Board of Trustees of Stanford University in 2000. She served as its president from 2008 to 2012, making her the second woman after Jane Stanford to do so. She served as co-chair of the 2013–2014 advisory council of Stanford Live, the performing arts organization at Stanford. With her husband, she endows fellowships for undergraduate students at Stanford University. They also endowed the Hume Center for Writing and Speaking at Stanford University.

=== Personal life ===
She is married to George H. Hume, a philanthropist and president of Basic American Foods. They have a son and a daughter.

== Works ==
=== As an editor ===
- Victorian Women: A Documentary Account of Women's Lives in 19th-Century England, France and the United States, with Erna O. Hellerstein and Karen Offen (Stanford University Press, 1981).

=== As an author ===
- The National Union of Women's Suffrage Societies, 1897-1914 (Garland Publishing, 1982).
