= Jaquelin H. Hume =

American businessman (1905–1991)

- Born: 1905; Harbor Point, Michigan, US
- Died: October 1, 1991 (aged 85–86); San Francisco, California, US
- Education: Princeton University; Harvard Business School
- Occupations: Businessman, philanthropist
- Political party: Republican Party
- Spouse: Caroline Howard Hume
- Children: 4, including William J. Hume and George H. Hume
- Relatives: Leslie P. Hume (daughter-in-law)

Jaquelin Holliday "Jack" Hume (1905–1991) was an American businessman and conservative philanthropist. He co-founded Basic American Foods, the world's largest producer of dried onion and garlic, and later dried potatoes, for instant mashed potatoes and boxed potato casseroles. He was a major donor to President Ronald Reagan, and a patron of the arts.

== Biography ==
=== Early life ===
Jaquelin Holliday Hume was born in 1905 in Harbor Point, Michigan. He had an older brother, William Mansur Hume (1900-1976), with whom he would later pioneer the family dehydration business. Hume grew up in Indianapolis, Indiana and graduated from Princeton University in 1928, where he had been a member of the Charter Club, subsequently receiving an M.B.A. from the Harvard Business School in Cambridge, Massachusetts in 1930.

=== Business career ===
With his brother, he co-founded the Basic Vegetable Products Company in 1933. The company sold dried onion and garlic as well as dried beans. After it successfully merged with its competitors, it became the world's largest producer of dried onion and garlic. In the 1950s, he founded the American Potato Company. It became the world's largest producer of dried potato products, including instant mashed potatoes. Both companies later became known as Basic American Foods.

On December 8, 1966, he filed the patent named "Process of producing large dehydrated onion pieces": 'US 3607316 A'.

=== Philanthropy ===
He served as Chairman of the Board of Trustees of the Pacific Presbyterian Medical Center. He also served as Chairman of the San Francisco Museum of Art and Vice Chairman of the Asian Art Foundation.

In 1962, he established the Jaquelin Hume Foundation. Seventeen years later, in 1975, he established the Foundation for Teaching Economics, a non-profit organization that promotes the teaching of economics in elementary and high schools in the United States. He received the George Washington Honor Medal from the Freedoms Foundation near Valley Forge, Pennsylvania, a conservative organization, for his philanthropic work to promote free market economics.

He was a staunch supporter of and donor to Ronald Reagan, both in his gubernatorial and presidential campaigns. Indeed, he had known President Reagan as earlier as 1965. He was also "a close friend" of Edwin Meese, who went on to serve as the 75th Attorney General of the United States from 1985 to 1988. Hume established Citizens for America and the served on the Board of the Ronald Reagan Presidential Foundation, two organizations which promoted Reagan's ideas. He also advised President Reagan and helped him choose top advisors in his first Cabinet. A letter from President Reagan to Hume and his wife dated April 27, 1981 has been published in Reagan: A Life in Letters. He also raised funds for other conservative Republicans.

He served on the Alumni Council of his alma mater, Princeton University. He received the Alumni Achievement Award from his other alma mater, the Harvard Business School, in 1981. He was a member of the Pacific-Union Club, a gentlemen's club in San Francisco, California.

=== Personal life ===
He was married to Caroline Howard Hume, a philanthropist. They had four children: Patricia Highberg, Carol Tolan, William J. Hume, and George H. Hume. They resided in San Francisco, California.

=== Death ===
He died of a cancer-related stroke in San Francisco on Tuesday, October 1, 1991.

== Legacy ==
- The Jaquelin H. Hume Papers are kept at the Hoover Institution Archives on the campus of Stanford University in Stanford, California. According to the abstract, it contains, "Correspondence, memoranda, reports, studies, lists, and financial records, relating to Republican Party fundraising activities, especially in California, election campaigns of Ronald Reagan, especially his presidential campaign in 1976, and the gubernatorial and presidential administrations of Ronald Reagan."
- The Jaquelin Hume Foundation remains an established conservative non-profit organization. Since 1998, it has focused on education reform in the United States, especially charter schools, vouchers, standards, and curricula. It has granted donations to the Center for Education Reform, the State Policy Network, the Institute for Justice, the Alliance for School Choice, and the Association of American Educators.
- His son, William J. Hume, a.k.a. Jerry Hume, serves as the Chairman of Basic American Foods. He is also a conservative philanthropist.
