= George H. Hume =

American philanthropist

- Education: Yale University; Stanford University
- Occupation: Philanthropist
- Spouse: Leslie P. Hume
- Parent(s): Jaquelin H. Hume; Caroline Howard Hume
- Relatives: William J. Hume (brother)

George H. Hume is an American heir, businessman and philanthropist. He serves as president and chief executive officer of Basic American Foods, the world's largest producer of dried onion, garlic and potato products. He served as president of the San Francisco Opera Association from 2006 to 2013, and currently serves as its vice chairman.

== Biography ==
=== Early life ===
Hume is the son of Jaquelin H. Hume, the co-founder of Basic American Foods, and Caroline Howard Hume, a philanthropist. He has a brother, William J. Hume, and two sisters, Patricia Highberg and Carol Tolan.

He graduated from Yale University in New Haven, Connecticut and received a J.D. and M.B.A. from Stanford University in Stanford, California.

=== Career ===
He started his career as a consultant for McKinsey & Company for three years. He then joined his family business, Basic American Foods. He serves as president and chief executive officer of Basic American Foods. It is the world's largest producer of dried onion and garlic as well as potato products (used primarily for instant mashed potatoes).

=== Philanthropy ===
Hume served as the president and director of the San Francisco Opera Association from 2006 to 2013. As of August 1, 2013, he serves as its vice chairman.

He is a donor to the San Francisco Veterans Memorial, where he serves on the steering committee. He is a member of the Pacific-Union Club, a gentlemen's club in San Francisco, California. He served as a founding trustee of the San Francisco Day School. He serves on the board of trustees of the Foundation for Teaching Economics. With his wife, he has donated to the Steadman Philippon Research Institute in Vail, Colorado.

He served on the board of trustees of his alma mater, Stanford University. With his wife, he serves co-chair the 2013/14 advisory council of Stanford Live, the performing arts organization at Stanford. They have also endowed both graduate and undergraduate fellowships at Stanford University and the Hume Writing Center for Writing and Speaking at Stanford is named in their honor to recognize their generous funding.

=== Personal life ===
He is married to Leslie P. Hume, a philanthropist. They have a son and a daughter.
