= William S. Price III =

American businessman, investor, and winemaker

William S. "Bill" Price III is an American businessman, investor, and winemaker. He is one of the three co-founders and a partner emeritus of the private equity firm TPG Capital, formerly known as the Texas Pacific Group.

== Early life and education ==
Price was born in Los Angeles and grew up in Hawaii.

He received his bachelor's degree from Stanford University in 1978, and his Juris Doctor degree from the University of California, Berkeley School of Law in 1981.

== Career ==
After completing law school, in 1981 Price joined the Los Angeles law firm Gibson, Dunn and Crutcher, where he specialized in corporate securities transactions.

In 1985, he joined Bain & Company, where he rose to become partner and co-head of the financial services practice.

He left Bain in 1991, to work briefly at GE Capital, as vice president of business development and strategic planning.

In 1992, he left GE Capital to co-found the private equity firm Texas Pacific Group (now TPG Capital), with David Bonderman and James Coulter. In their first major deal, in 1993 they completed the leveraged buyout of Continental Airlines.

During his tenure, Price was also involved with all of TPG's subsequent investments, most notably Beringer, Petco, Ducati and Grohe.

In 2006, Price announced that he would scale back his work at TPG to focus on personal pursuits, including his holdings in wine vineyards.

Price is currently proprietor of Classic Wines, LLC and Price Family Vineyards, LLC, which has invested in Durell Vineyard, Gap's Crown Vineyard, Walala Vineyard, Kistler Vineyards, Three Sticks Wines and Lutum. He is currently chairman of Gary Farrell Vineyards & Winery, and was chairman of Kosta Browne from 2009 through 2015.

== Personal life ==
Price lives in Sonoma, California. He is married and has three children.

In the summer of 2020, Price contributed to the political campaign of Arizona Senator Kyrsten Sinema, who had promised to oppose any tax increases on either corporate or personal rates, by giving Sinema a week-long paid internship at his Sonoma, California winery, and by hosting a fundraiser at the winery that benefitted her campaign committee and a leadership PAC for fellow congressional moderates.
