= James Coulter (financier) =

American billionaire businessman

- Born: December 1, 1959 (age 66); Buffalo, New York, U.S.
- Education: Dartmouth College; Stanford University
- Occupation: Co-founder of Texas Pacific Group
- Employer: TPG Inc. (formerly Texas Pacific Group)
- Spouse: Penny Saer
- Children: 3

James Coulter (born December 1, 1959) is an American billionaire businessman. He is the co-founder of private equity firm TPG Inc., originally known as the Texas Pacific Group.

== Early life and education ==
Coulter was born on December 1, 1959, and raised in a Methodist family, the son of Shirley (née Nagler) and James W. Coulter. His father was a chemical salesman for Chevron. He is a graduate of Shawnee High School in Medford, New Jersey. He graduated summa cum laude from Dartmouth College, where he was also a member of Alpha Chi Alpha. He subsequently earned an MBA from the Stanford Graduate School of Business in 1986, where he was named an Arjay Miller Scholar.

== Career ==
In 1992, Coulter co-founded the Fort Worth and San Francisco-based private equity firm TPG along with David Bonderman. He served as co-CEO from 2014 through 2021 alongside Jon Winkelried. In 2021, Coulter became executive chair of TPG and assumed responsibility for TPG's climate investing initiatives, including as Managing Partner of TPG Rise Climate. TPG went public in January 2022, trading on the NASDAQ under the ticker symbol “TPG”.

Prior to co-founding TPG in 1992, Coulter and the other co-founders worked for Robert M. Bass. Coulter joined the Robert M. Bass Group from Lehman Brothers Kuhn Loeb.

Coulter has been involved in some of the largest leveraged buyout transactions on record including TPG's marquee transaction, the takeover of Continental Airlines in 1993. He has been involved with TPG's investments in America West Airlines, Burger King, Del Monte Foods, J. Crew, Ducati Motor Holding, Gemplus International, MEMC, ON Semiconductor, Oxford Health Plans, Petco and Seagate Technology.

He is the founder of the Coulter IDEApitch at New Orleans Entrepreneur Week (often referred to as NOEW). Winners of Coulter IDEApitch competition receive a $100,000 investment towards their next round of funding. Winners include Servato, an Industrial Internet of Things technology company (2015 winner); Acrew, a video interviewing HR tech product (2017 winner); and AxoSim, a pharmaceutical research company (2018 winner).

In 2020, Forbes ranked him No. 359 on the Forbes 400 list of the richest people in America.

== Memberships ==
Coulter serves as a member on numerous boards:

- Creative Artists Agency
- IMS Health
- Vincraft Group
- Board of Trustees of Dartmouth College
- Stanford University board of trustees
- Common Sense Media
- San Francisco University High School
- America West Holdings
- Northwest Airlines
- Oxford Health Plans Inc.
- Genesis Health Ventures Inc.
- Virata Corporation
- San Francisco Zoological Society
- Bay Area Discovery Museum
- San Francisco Day School

== Personal life ==
Coulter is married to Penny Saer from New Orleans. They have three children.
