= Summerbridge =

Summerbridge may refer to:

- Summerbridge, North Yorkshire, village in England
- Breakthrough Collaborative, formerly Summerbridge National, educational programs in USA and Hong Kong
