= Caroline Howard Hume =

American philanthropist and art collector (1909–2008)

- Born: Caroline Howard; 1909; Los Angeles, California, U.S.
- Died: 2008 (aged 98–99); San Francisco, California, U.S.
- Education: Marlborough School; Rosemary Hall; Finch College
- Occupation: Philanthropist
- Spouse: Jaquelin H. Hume
- Children: Patricia Highberg; Carol Tolan; William J. Hume; George H. Hume
- Relatives: Leslie P. Hume (daughter-in-law)

Caroline Howard Hume (a.k.a. Betty Hume) (1909–2008) was an American philanthropist and art collector from California. Hume's philanthropy extended to non-profit organizations in the areas of music, the outdoors, and modern art. She was appointed by President Ronald Reagan to serve on the Museum Services Board and by the Secretary of Interior to serve on the National Parks Foundation. Hume was a significant benefactor of the San Francisco Symphony, the San Francisco Conservatory of Music, and the San Francisco Museum of Modern Art.

== Biography ==
=== Early life and education ===
Caroline Howard was born in 1909 in Los Angeles, California. She was educated at the Marlborough School in Hancock Park, Los Angeles, Rosemary Hall in Wallingford, Connecticut, and Finch College in Manhattan, New York City.

=== Philanthropy ===
In 1935, a few months before her wedding, she established the Los Angeles Women's Junior Philharmonic. After she moved to San Francisco, California with her husband, she became a donor to the San Francisco Symphony and the San Francisco Conservatory of Music. Indeed, she served on the board of directors of the San Francisco Symphony from 1946 to her death in 2008. Moreover, a significant charitable donation she made to the Conservatory led to its move to Oak Street, where the Caroline H. Hume Concert Hall is named in her honor. She also received the Golden Hallow Award from the Conservatory. In 2010, its Annual Spring Gala was held in her honor. Furthermore, she endowed the Caroline H. Hume Endowed Chair at the San Francisco Opera, currently held by Nicola Luisotti, the music director.

She was appointed by President Ronald Reagan to serve on the board of trustees of the National Museum Services. She was also appointed to serve on the National Parks Foundation by the United States Secretary of the Interior, and she was also a council member of the Yosemite Fund, a fundraising initiative for the Yosemite National Park.

She served on the board of trustees of the San Francisco Museum of Modern Art. An art collector, she was particularly fond of German expressionism. She donated some of her collection to museums in the United States. For example, she donated L'Urto by Emilio Scanavino to the San Francisco Museum of Modern Art. She also donated Figural Alpha by Ernst Wilhelm Nay to the Princeton University Art Museum. Moreover, she donated Phenomenal Lands End by Paul Jenkins to the Smithsonian Institution.

She received the Philanthropist of the Year award from the Association of Fundraising Professionals in 2001.

=== Personal life ===
On February 20, 1935, she married Jaquelin H. Hume, the co-founder of Basic American Foods. They had four children: Patricia Highberg, Carol Tolan, William J. Hume, and George H. Hume. They lived in Presidio Heights, a suburb of San Francisco. She became a widow when he died in 1991.

=== Death ===
She died in 2008 in San Francisco. Her funeral took place at the Grace Cathedral in San Francisco.
