= Foundation for Teaching Economics =

Foundation for Teaching Economics

The Foundation for Teaching Economics (FTE) is an organization founded in 1975 that promotes economics education by hosting workshops for high school students and teachers, and by providing educational resources to teachers.

== History ==
The organization was established in 1975 by Jaquelin H. Hume, the co-founder of Basic American Foods. The foundation promotes the teaching of economics in elementary and high schools in the United States. and describes its mission as promoting "excellence in economic education by helping teachers of economics become more effective educators".

As of 2009, Jaquelin H. Hume's two sons William J. Hume and George H. Hume served on the Board of Trustees. The other trustees were Orley Ashenfelter, a professor of economics at Princeton University; Arthur J. Hedge, an investor; Caroline Hoxby, a professor of economics at Stanford University; Jay Jacobs, an investor; Edward A. Landry, an attorney; John Manfredi, an investor; Douglass North, the 1993 winner of the Nobel Memorial Prize in Economic Sciences; Vernon L. Smith, the 2002 winner of the Nobel Memorial Prize in Economic Sciences; and Christopher A. Wright, an investor.
