= Citizens for America =

American conservative organization

Citizens for America (CFA) was a United States conservative grass-roots organization founded by President Ronald Reagan's "Kitchen Cabinet", including Jaquelin H. Hume, CEO of Basic American Foods in San Francisco, Southern California car dealer Holmes Tuttle, and others, to support President Reagan's national defense and economic initiatives. CFA, which called itself "President Reagan's Lobby", was led first by drugstore magnate Lewis E. Lehrman and later by Gerald P. Carmen, a former administrator of the General Services Administration (GSA) and U.S. ambassador to the United Nations mission in Geneva, Switzerland. CFA was organized as an IRS 501 (C) (3) and (4) non-profit. Among the early employees was Jack Abramoff, who was later terminated for cause.

== History ==
Citizens for America staged an unprecedented meeting of anti-Communist rebel leaders, calling themselves "Armed Movements Fighting Against Soviet Expansionism", formed by Nicaraguan, Laotian, Angolan and Afghan (Mujahideen) rebels in June 1985 in Jamba, Angola, the UNITA headquarters of Angolan rebel Jonas Savimbi. The guerrilla leaders were presented with a copy of the United States Declaration of Independence, and a letter from President Reagan supporting CFA was read, although the Reagan administration refused to officially support all of the guerrilla groups.

Marc Holtzman, who later ran for governor of Colorado, served as CFA's first executive director. Under Holtzman's tenure, CFA focused on promoting the Reagan economic and national security agenda, including the strategic defense initiative. Holtzman resigned in early 1985 and was replaced by Jack Abramoff, former national chairman of the College Republican National Committee. Lehrman fired Abramoff after only nine months due to his mismanagement of the organization's $3 million budget and his hiring of friends.

Abramoff was replaced by CFA's legal counsel Frank Trotta, who served as interim executive director until Bill Wilson was appointed executive director. Wilson served for a year, after which attorney and writer Jack R. Stevens became executive director. Stevens served for two years and was the organization's executive director in its final days under President Reagan. Trotta, Wilson, and Stevens, who earlier served as CFA's western regional director, were credited with restoring CFA's finances and reputation after Abramoff's brief tenure.

CFA supported its grass-roots lobbying campaigns by hosting two fundraisers annually. The "Founder's Circle" required a contribution of $25,000 per year and included donors like Joseph and Holly Coors, Holmes Tuttle and Jack Hume. President Reagan hosted CFA donors and staff regularly at the White House. At one such session in 1987, he recognized CFA National Director Gerald P. Carmen and Executive Director Jack Stevens for their efforts in orchestrating the organization's successful campaign to secure $100 million in congressional aid to the Nicaraguan Contras. CFA staff met in the White House with Reagan Administration officials on a weekly basis to coordinate field activities.

Stevens hired Liam Weston, who later became Mayor Pro Tem of El Segundo, California as CFA's eastern regional director in 1987. Weston later served as a Republican staff member in the 104th U.S. Congress. He left Congress and moved to Central America to administer the U.S. aid to the Nicaraguan Resistance 1989–1991. In 1991–1993, he was posted to Africa, where he managed an aid program for the Angolan UNITA rebels.

President Reagan mentioned CFA 11 times in "The Reagan Diaries", including an entry in his final days in office that CFA is one of the few groups with which would consider staying involved upon leaving office.

President Reagan credited CFA's extensive field operations, and cited field leaders Weston, Gordon Bloyer (now an Internet blogger and video commentator) Kelly Cardwell of Alabama, Cecil Martin “Bud” Starr, III, now a Kern County, California prosecutor, Robert Miltenberg, former California legislator Doug Carter (now deceased), and San Francisco activist Dorothy Vuksich (now deceased), with helping secure congressional support for Afghan rebel aid, Contra aid, and tax reduction and simplification, among other issues. CFA organized volunteer committees and chairmen in each congressional district to conduct grass-roots campaigns in support of Reagan's strategic and economic agenda. The organization was able to unite all segments of the conservative movement, though it took no position on social issues.

== Awards ==
Stevens and Weston, in coordination with Reagan's Office of Management and Budget director Jim Miller and former CFA communications director David Carmen, who is now CEO of the Carmen Group, a Washington, D.C.-based public affairs firm, created the first annual "Pork Barrel" spending awards, a dubious distinction for members of Congress CFA considered to be profligate spenders. CFA published “The Pork Book” in 1987. Taxpayers Against Government Fraud and Waste along with other public policy organizations continued the annual event by recognizing certain congressmen for supporting excessive "pork barrel" spending.
