= William J. Hume =

American businessman

- Education: Yale College
- Occupations: Businessman, philanthropist
- Parent(s): Jaquelin H. Hume; Caroline Howard Hume
- Relatives: George H. Hume (brother); Leslie P. Hume (sister-in-law)

William J. Hume, known as Jerry Hume, was an American businessman and conservative donor.

== Early life and education ==
Hume was born to Jaquelin H. Hume, the co-founder of Basic American Foods, the world's largest supplier of dried potato and bean products, and Caroline Howard Hume, a philanthropist. He has a brother, George H. Hume, and two sisters, Patricia Highberg and Carol Tolan. He graduated from Yale College in 1961.

== Career ==
He serves as chairman of his family business, Basic American Foods.

== Philanthropy ==
He has been described by The Los Angeles Times as a "major Republican donor." In 1972, he helped found San Francisco University High School, which his children attended. In the late 1970s, he joined the education taskforce of the California Business Roundtable. He was also a board member of the National Assessment of Educational Progress, and one of his reports paved the way for No Child Left Behind. In the early 1990s, he donated US$100,000 for school vouchers in Colorado and Oregon. By 1995, he was appointed by Governor Pete Wilson to serve on the California State Board of Education, where he supported school choice. He was also Chairman of the California Academy of Sciences and he served on the Boards of Trustees of the California Council on Economic Education and Teach For America. In 1996, he donated US$200,000 to support Ward Connerly's California Proposition 209, which amended the state constitution to prohibit state government institutions from considering race, sex, or ethnicity, specifically in the areas of public employment, public contracting or public education.

He is chairman of the Foundation for Teaching Economics. He sits on the Boards of Trustees of The Heritage Foundation, the Foundation for Individual Rights in Education, the Hoover Institution at Stanford University, The Foundation for Educational Choice, the Center for Education Reform, and Donors Trust.

He has also donated to the Jaqueline Hume Foundation, named for his late father, where he serves as Second Vice President and Treasurer.

In 2008, he received the first Sir Anthony Fisher Freedom Award from the Pacific Research Institute.

== Personal life ==
His wife is from Chile, and they have adult children.

== Death ==
Jerry Hume died at his home in San Francisco on January 23, 2023.
