= TPG Inc. =

American investment company

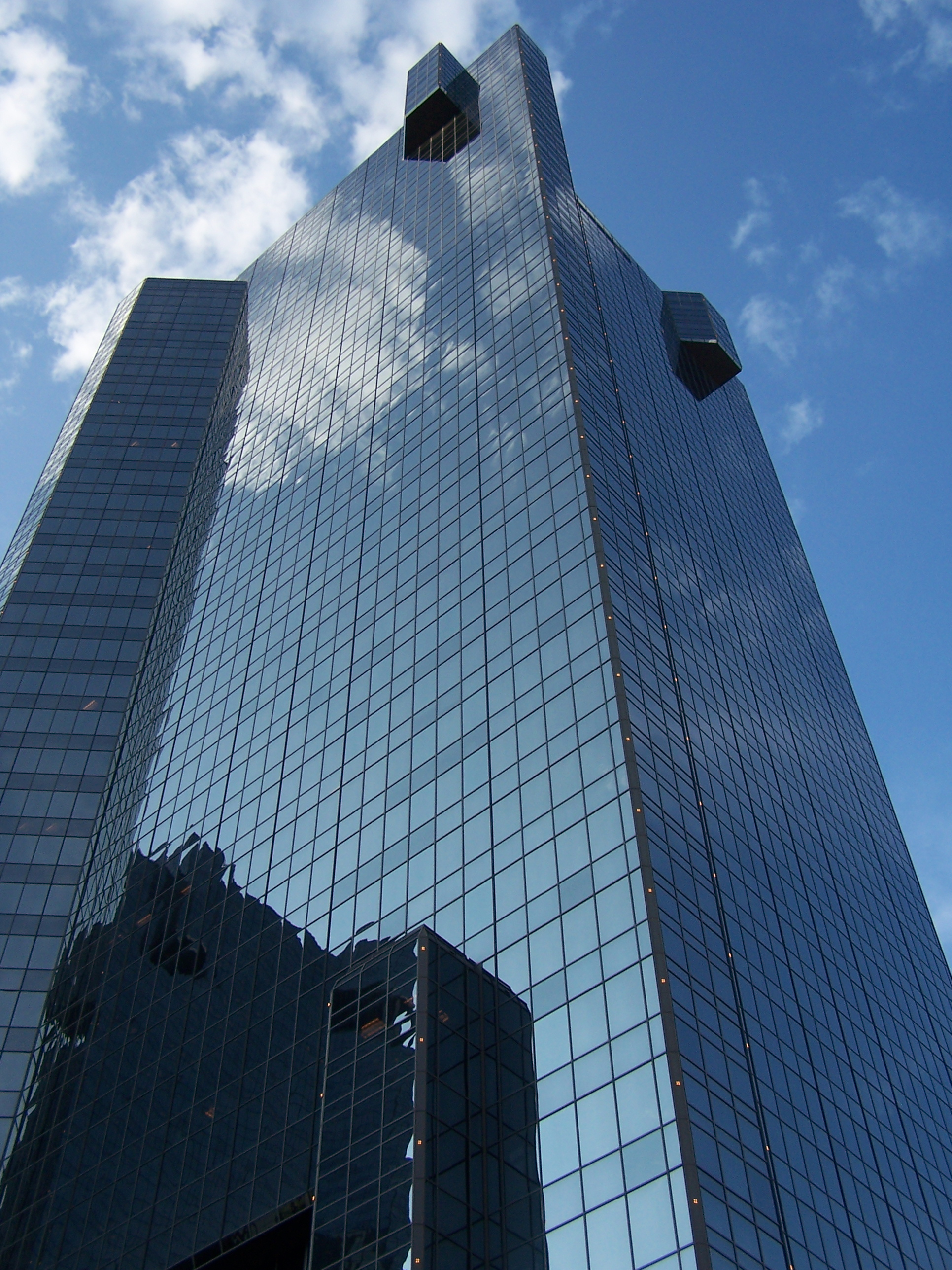
- Headquarters at Bank of America Tower in Fort Worth
- Type: Public
- Traded as: Nasdaq: TPG (Class A); Russell 1000 component
- Industry: Private equity
- Predecessor: Texas Pacific Group
- Founded: 1992; 34 years ago
- Founders: David Bonderman; James Coulter; William S. Price III
- Headquarters: Corporate: Bank of America Tower, Fort Worth, Texas; Operational: 888 Seventh Avenue; New York, NY 10106; United States
- Key people: James Coulter (chairman); Jon Winkelried (CEO)
- Products: Leveraged buyouts; Growth capital; Venture capital
- Revenue: ▲US$4.67 billion (2025)
- Net income: ▲US$185 million (2025)
- AUM: ▲US$245.9 billion (2024)
- Total assets: ▲US$13.5 billion (2025)
- Total equity: ▲US$4.14 billion (2025)
- Number of employees: 1,900 (2024)
- Subsidiaries: TPG Angelo Gordon TPG PepperTree
- Website: tpg.com

TPG Inc., previously known as Texas Pacific Group and TPG Capital, is an American private equity firm based in Fort Worth, Texas, with primary offices in New York City and additional offices in Washington, D.C., Miami, San Francisco, and internationally. TPG manages investment funds in growth capital, venture capital, public equity, and debt investments. The firm invests in various industries, including consumer/retail, media and telecommunications, industrials, technology, travel, leisure, and health care.

== History and notable investments ==
=== Founding and early history ===
Texas Pacific Group, later TPG Capital, was founded in 1992 by David Bonderman, James Coulter, and William S. Price III. Prior to founding TPG, Bonderman and Coulter had worked for American billionaire, philanthropist, and investor Robert Bass, making leveraged buyout investments during the 1980s.

In 1993, Coulter and Bonderman partnered with GE Capital vice president of strategic planning and business development William S. Price III to complete the buyout of Continental Airlines.

In 1994, TPG, Blum Capital and ACON Investments created Newbridge Capital, a joint-venture to invest in emerging markets, particularly in Asia and, later, in Latin America.

In June 1996, TPG acquired the AT&T Paradyne unit, a multimedia communications business, from Lucent Technologies for $175 million. Also in 1996, TPG invested in Beringer Wine and Ducati Motorcycles.

In 1997, TPG raised over $2.5 billion for its second private equity fund. TPG made notable investments that year. First was its takeover of the retailer J. Crew, acquiring an 88% stake for approximately $500 million; the investment struggled due to the high purchase price paid relative to the company's earnings. The company was able to complete a turnaround, beginning in 2002, and to complete an IPO in 2006. TPG then purchased Del Monte Foods for a reported $800 million and then took the company public.

In 1998, TPG led a minority investment in Oxford Health Plans. TPG and its co-investors invested $350 million in a convertible preferred stock that can be converted into 22.1% of Oxford shareholding. The company completed a buyback of TPG's PIPE convertible in 2000, which would ultimately be acquired by UnitedHealth Group, in 2004.

In 1999, TPG invested in Piaggio S.p.A., Bally International (including Bally Shoe), and ON Semiconductor. T3 Partners was started in 2001 to invest alongside the main fund in technology-oriented investments.

=== 2000–2010 ===
In 2000 TPG and Leonard Green & Partners invested $200 million to acquire Petco, the pet supplies retailer as part of a $600 million buyout. Within two years they sold most of it in a public offering that valued the company at $1 billion. Petco's market value greatly increased by the end of 2004 and the firms would ultimately realize a gain of $1.2 billion. Then, in 2006, the private equity firms took Petco private again for $1.68 billion.

In 2000, TPG completed the controversial acquisition of Gemplus SA, a smart card manufacturer. TPG won a struggle with the company's founder, Marc Lassus, for control of the company. Also in 2000, TPG completed an investment in Seagate Technology.

In 2001, TPG acquired Telenor Media, a Norwegian phone-directory company, for $660 million, and shortly thereafter acquired a controlling interest in silicon-wafer maker MEMC Electronic Materials.

In July 2002, TPG, together with Bain Capital and Goldman Sachs Alternatives, announced the $2.3 billion leveraged buyout of Burger King from Diageo. However, in November the original transaction collapsed, when Burger King failed to meet certain performance targets. In December 2002, TPG and its co-investors agreed on a reduced $1.5 billion purchase price for the investment. The TPG consortium had support from Burger King's franchisees, which controlled approximately 92% of Burger King restaurants at the time of the transaction. Under its new owners, Burger King underwent a brand overhaul including the use of The Burger King character in advertising. In February 2006, Burger King announced plans for an initial public offering.

In November 2003, TPG provided a proposal to buy Portland General Electric from Enron. However, concerns about debt led to Oregon Public Utility Commission regulators to deny permission for the purchase on March 10, 2005.

TPG entered the film production business in late 2004, in the major leveraged buyout of Metro-Goldwyn-Mayer. A consortium led by TPG and Sony completed the $4.81 billion buyout of the film studio. The consortium also included media-focused firms Providence Equity Partners and Quadrangle Group, as well as DLJ Merchant Banking Partners. The transaction was announced in September 2004, and completed in early 2005.

Also in 2005, TPG was involved in the buyout of SunGard in a transaction valued at $11.3 billion. TPG's partners in the acquisition were Silver Lake Partners, Bain Capital, Goldman Sachs Alternatives, KKR, Providence Equity Partners, and Blackstone. This represented the largest leveraged buyout completed since the takeover of RJR Nabisco at the end of the 1980s leveraged buyout boom. At the time of its announcement, SunGard would be the largest buyout of a technology company in history, a distinction later ceded to the buyout of Freescale Semiconductor. The involvement of seven firms in the consortium was criticized by investors in private equity who considered cross-holdings among firms to be generally unattractive.

On May 15, 2006, Smurfit-Stone reported the definitive sale for $1.04 billion in cash of its consumer packaging division to the Texas Pacific Group.

In early 2006, as TPG was completing fundraising for its fifth private equity fund, co-founder Bill Price announced that he would reduce his work at the firm. On December 1, it was announced TPG and Kohlberg Kravis Roberts had been exploring the possibility of a $100 billion leveraged buyout of Home Depot.

In early 2007, the firm changed its name to TPG, rebranding all of its funds across different geographies. In August, Midwest Air Group, parent company of Midwest Airlines, signed a definitive merger agreement to be acquired by an affiliate of TPG Capital in a transaction valued at approximately $450 million.

On April 7, 2008, TPG led a $7 billion investment in Washington Mutual. On September 25, 2008, Washington Mutual was taken over by the U.S. government, costing TPG a $1.35 billion investment. It has been called by some analysts "the worst deal in private equity history."

On October 31, 2008, TPG completed the purchase of a 35% interest in P.T. Bumi Resources, from its previous owner Bakrie & Brothers, Indonesia, for $1.3 billion. In June 2009, Republic Airways Holdings Inc., a provider of regional flights for larger carriers, agreed to buy Midwest Airlines from TPG Capital.

On March 12, 2010, Gretchen Morgenson, in The New York Times, discussed TPG's role as a private equity investor in Greek mobile phone operator WIND Hellas, formerly TIM Hellas, which filed for bankruptcy protection late 2009. Morgenson raised questions about the circumstances in which TPG and fellow private equity investors Apax Partners of London redeemed a significant quantity of "convertible preferred equity certificates" held by them to repay their own "deeply subordinated shareholder loans" during a period in which a significant and apparently unexplained spike occurred in the market value of the certificates.

=== 2010–2020 ===
On June 10, 2010, TPG announced an acquisition of Vertafore, a provider of software for the insurance industry, for $1.4 billion.

On July 13, 2011, affiliates of TPG Capital acquired Primedia Inc. for approximately $525 million. TPG and fellow private equity firm Apollo Global Management are set to IPO their stake in Norwegian Cruise Lines in 2013.

In July 2013, TPG announced it would buy global education publisher TSL Education, later TES Global, publishers of TES magazine) from Charterhouse Group, for a fee of around $600 million. TPG and movie producer Robert Simonds Jr., announced in March 2014 that they had entered a partnership with China's Hony Capital to produce up to 10 "star-driven" films a year, with mid-range budgets of about $40 million per film.

In April 2014, it was announced that TPG had invested £200 million in Victoria Plumb after buying a majority stake. In November 2014, Prezzo Holdings agreed to a £303.7 million takeover by TPG.

In the first half of 2014, the company started to raise funds for a real-estate specific fund. It had a goal of $1.5 billion to $2 billion. By October 2015, the company had exceeded its goal, raising more than $2 billion.

In 2016, TPG partnered with Bono and Jeff Skoll to launch The Rise Fund, a social impact investment fund. In August, TPG Growth, the growth equity and smaller buyout investment arm of TPG Capital, acquired technology staffing firm Frank Recruitment Group in a deal that valued the company at £200 million.

In January 2017, TPG acquired a majority of A&O Hotels and Hostels, Europe's biggest privately owned hostel platform, based in Germany.

On January 25, 2017, TPG announced that after a nearly two-year search, it had hired Bradford Berenson as its general counsel. Berenson had been vice president and senior counsel for litigation and legal policy for General Electric (GE), where he was "responsible for litigation, government and internal investigations, compliance, and legal policy worldwide." From 2001 to 2003, Bereson served as Associate White House Counsel to President George W. Bush.

In 2017, Bonderman left the board of Uber "after he made a sexist comment in response to Arianna Huffington at an Uber meeting". In July, Ajay Kanwal and Naveen Chopra joined TPG as senior advisors.

In September 2017, TPG Capital acquired majority stake in Australia's largest contract research organization, Novotech Clinical Research. In November, TPG Capital acquired Mendocino Farms; former Yard House CEO Harald Herrmann was appointed as its CEO. In 2017–2018 TPG invested in Solinftec.

In February 2018, TPG backed former AOL CEO Jon Miller in acquiring Fandom (formerly Wikia, Inc.). Miller was named co-chairman of Wikia, alongside Jimmy Wales, and TPG Capital director Andrew Doyle assumed the role of interim CEO.

In March 2018, Manipal Hospitals and TPG Capital acquired Fortis Healthcare as part of a deal for ₹39 billion.

=== 2020–present ===
In 2020, TPG joined Diligent Corporation's Modern Leadership Initiative and pledged to create five new board roles among its portfolio companies for racially diverse candidates. In April, TPG acquired Lifestance Health for $1.2bn in equity; Lifestance has since gone public.

On February 25, 2021, AT&T announced that it would spin-off DirecTV, U-verse and AT&T TV into a separate entity, selling a 30% stake to TPG Capital while retaining a 70% stake in the new standalone company. The deal was closed on August 2, 2021.

In July 2021, TPG announced it had raised $5.4 billion in a first close for its inaugural TPG Rise Climate fund, a climate investing strategy focused on commercially viable climate technologies. Institutional investment backers included Allstate, the Ontario Teachers' Pension Plan, and the Washington State Investment Board. Concurrent with the fund close, the firm formed Rise Climate Coalition, organized to scale climate technologies and share best-practices. Members include individuals and representatives from companies such as Apple, Bank of America, Honeywell, Boeing, and John Deere. In April 2022, the fund announced the final close of TPG Rise Climate with $7.3 billion in total commitments.

On January 13, 2022, TPG went public on the Nasdaq stock exchange through an IPO at a $9 billion valuation. In April, the company purchased a majority stake in Sodali & Co, a proxy firm based in New York.

In May 2023, TPG agreed to acquire alternative investment firm Angelo Gordon in a cash and stock deal valued at $2.7 billion. In July, together with Francisco Partners, TPG agreed to acquire web tracking and analytics firm New Relic in an all-cash deal valued at $6.5 billion.

In March 2024, TPG created a mega Asian buyout fund worth W6.7 trillion. It closed its eighth Asian buyout fund worth W5 billion. It said it will inject 10 percent of it into the Korean market. On September 30, AT&T announced that it was selling its remaining 70% stake in DirecTV to TPG.

On September 30, 2024, TPG Angelo Gordon and a certain amount of its co-investors, as well as DirecTV, provided $2.5 billion of financing to fully refinance DISH DBS' November 2024 debt maturity.

On July 2, 2025, TPG completed its purchased 70% remaining stake in DirecTV from AT&T.

In July 2025, the company acquired Sabre Corporation's hospitality solutions business for US$1.1 billion.

== Private equity funds ==
TPG has historically relied primarily on private equity funds, pools of committed capital from pension funds, insurance companies, endowments, fund of funds, high-net-worth individuals, sovereign wealth funds, and from other institutional investors.

== Notable employees ==
- Bernard Attali, former chairman of Air France and brother of Jacques Attali
- Mark Fields, former president and CEO of Ford Motor Co.
- William Hawkins, president and CEO of Immucor and former CEO of Medtronic
- Mary Ma (deceased), former CFO of Lenovo, and was listed in the top ten of the Fortune "50 Most Powerful Women" in 2005 and 2006
- William "Bill" McGlashan Jr., founder of TPG Growth, TPG Capital's growth equity and smaller buyout investment arm; fired due to his involvement in the 2019 college admissions bribery scandal
- Vivek Paul, former vice chairman of Wipro Technologies and CEO of its global information technology, product engineering, and business process services segments
- Kevin Rollins, former president and CEO of Dell Computers
- Marc Mezvinsky, Husband of Chelsea Clinton, hired as a managing director and business-unit partner in 2019.
- Damola Adamolekun, former CEO of P. F. Chang's and current CEO of Red Lobster.

== See also ==
- List of Texas companies (T)
