= Solinftec =

Software company in Brazil

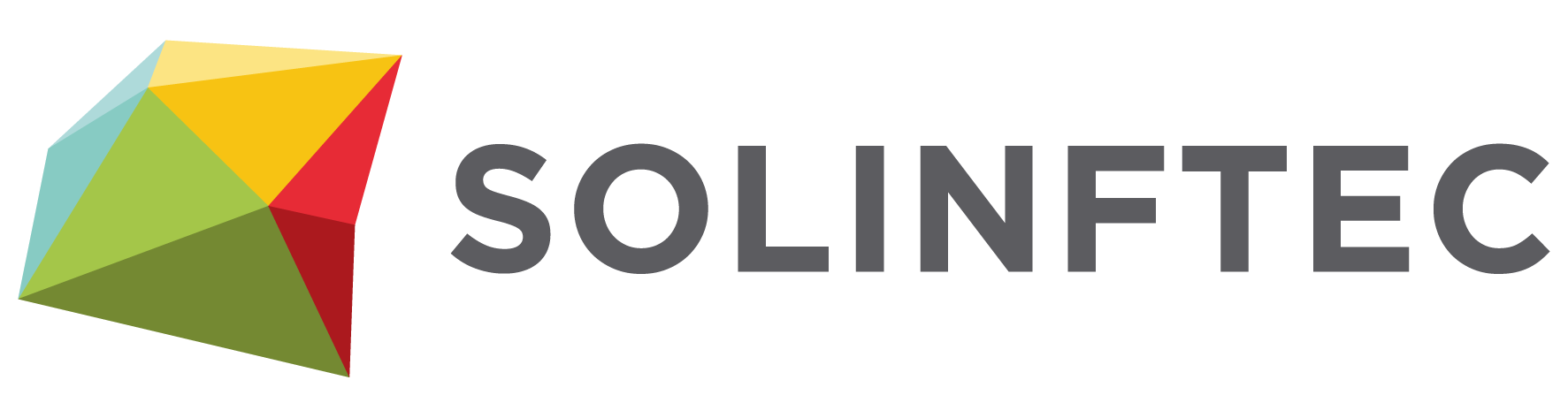
- Industry: Ag-tech
- Founded: 2007
- Founder: Britaldo Hernández Fernández, Enrique Ponce Caballero, Anselmo Del Toro Arce, Leslie González, Genrry Perez, Lazaro Victor Quintana Garcia, George Victor Diaz Calderin
- Headquarters: Araçatuba, São Paulo, Brazil

Solinftec is a global ag-tech company specializing in providing technologies for agribusiness. The company is headquartered in Araçatuba, São Paulo, Brazil.

== History ==
In 2007, Solinftec was founded by a group of Cuban automation engineers in Araçatuba, Brasil. Initially, Solinftec focused on developing solutions for the sugar and ethanol industry, which is a major sector in Brazil and nowadays cover the main crops such as row crops and perennials. The company's first product was a machine monitoring system that allowed sugar and ethanol mills to optimize their production processes sending information in real-time. In 2011, the company developed the first solution to traceability for certification of production origin—Sugarcane Digital Certificate.

In 2012, the company launched Sugarcane Harvesting Optimization (Single queue) a system that, through sensors and algorithms, generates efficiency in distribution of tractors and trucks in the sugarcane harvesting areas, promoting substantial cost reductions in the operation.

In 2013, the company developed SolinfNet, a communication network between devices that allows data transmissions in remote regions where is no internet connection.

In 2016, Solinftec closed the Series A investment round, and in 2017-2018 got undisclosed investments from TPG and Agfunder.

In April 2018, Solinftec presented its virtual assistant, Alice, that helps to control any process in the field.

In 2017-2018 got undisclosed investments from TPG and Agfunder.

In 2019, Solinftec won the AgFunder Award for Brazil, considered the ‘Global AgTech Oscar’ as the most innovative international startup in the Farm Tech category.

In 2020, Solinftec received a US$40 million investment in a series B round and a year later started partnership with IBM.

In 2022, the company launched Solix Ag Robotics, a robot that analyse the health of plants and assesses their nutritional content, looks for weeds, and evidence of insect damage. Also, the device monitors the state of the entire field's ecosystem.

Solinftec serves the largest agribusiness groups such as Cofco Agri, Biosev, Raízen, Usina Coruripe, Bunge, Tereos, Atvos, Amaggi, Bom Jesus, Fazendas Bartira, Grupo Bom Futuro, SLC Agrícola, LDC Juice, AgroTerenas, etc.

== Solix AG Robotics ==
In 2021, the company launched Solix Ag Robotics, a 100% autonomous robot equipped with 4 solar panels that analyzes plant health and assesses its nutritional content, searches for weeds, and detects evidence of insect damage. Additionally, the device monitors the overall ecosystem of the field, providing real-time information to the producer.

The platform features three main functionalities mentioned below:

- Scouting: Since Solix runs 24/7, it collects real time data from the field with pieces of information such as: insects’ infestation, plant nutrition, diseases, plant stand, plant population, types of pests and more.
- Sprayer: With targeted spray applications, Solix identifies weeds in early stage and kills them every 7 days when they will emerge again, using up to 95% less herbicides.
- Hunter: With different light waves, Solix is able to attract and kill insects throughout the field without using any type of insecticide.

In addition to all the functionalities mentioned above, the use of Solix prevents soil compaction, as it is a lightweight device that travels at 1 mph in the field, providing accurate visibility of field conditions.

== Structure ==
AgriTech has over 800 employees globally, 330 in research and development alone. In Brazil, besides its headquarters, it has seven more offices in different parts of the country, Sinop, Nova Mutum and Querência, in Mato Grosso, Luiz Eduardo Magalhães, in Bahia, and Balsas, in Maranhão.

In total, the company operates in more than 10 countries. Since 2019, it was launched in West Lafayette, Indiana, USA, in partnership with the renowned Center for Food and Agricultural Business at Purdue University.

The company also has an office in Saskatchewan, Canada, and a research center in Shenzhen, southwest China.

In Cali, Colombia, the office serves as a hub for Latin America, where the company operates in six countries.
