= A&O Hostels =

German chain of hostels

a&o Hotels and Hostels
- Type: GmbH
- Industry: Hostels, Hotels
- Founded: 2000
- Founder: Oliver Winter
- Headquarters: Berlin
- Number of locations: 44 (February 9, 2026)
- Revenue: € 232,400,000 (2024)
- Website: aohostels.com

a&o Hotels and Hostels GmbH is a chain of hostels, headquartered in Berlin, that targets young travelers and backpackers, offering cheap group rooms and hotel rooms for two. The hostels are generally centrally located, mostly close to train stations. A&O has 43 subsidiaries in eleven countries, making it the biggest privately owned hostel-chain in Europe. In 2024 it recorded about 6.2 million overnight stays and realised sales of €232 million.

== History ==
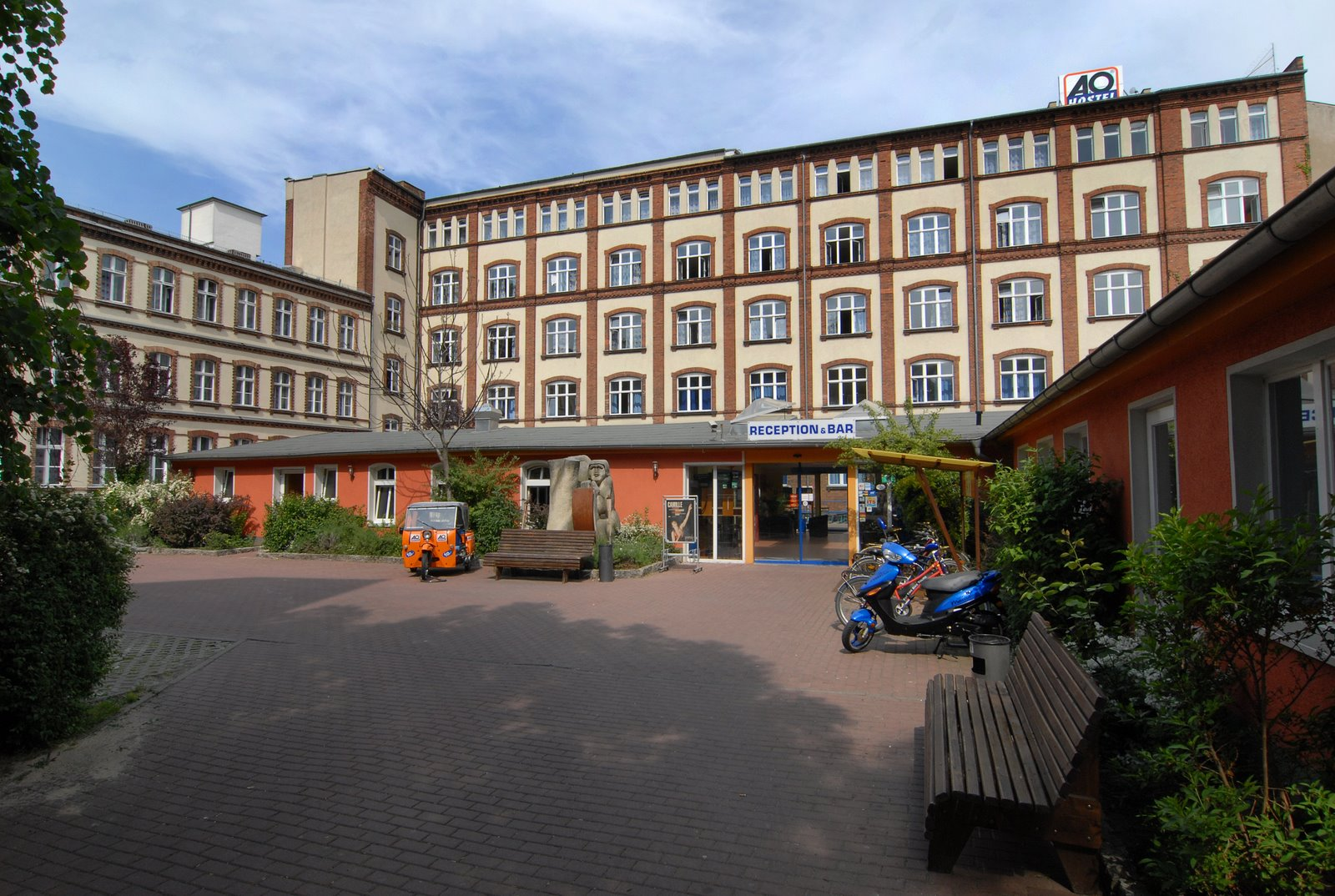
A&O Hostel in Berlin, the company's first property.

Founder Oliver Winter had the idea of opening a hostel after several trips through Europe in the late 1990s. There were few hostels in urban areas in Germany at that time; hostels in Germany were mostly situated in suburban or rural areas and were run by the German Youth Hostel Association; this was a problem for foreign travellers, because only members of the organisation could stay there.

In the year 2000 Winter and his landlord Michael Kluge opened the first a&o Hostel in Berlin Friedrichshain with 164 beds. After a year they doubled the number of beds, and in the years 2002 and 2004, they opened new hostels in Berlin. In 2005 the company opened its first houses outside Berlin, in Prague, Hamburg and Munich. From then on the company established various subsidiaries every year, mostly in Germany, but also in bordering countries.

In 2009, the company made headlines by winning a nearly 5-year-long Lawsuit against the DJH, the German Youth Hostel Association. In 2005, the DJH accused a&o of illegally using the word "Jugendherberge", the German term for youth hostel, which DJH had registered word as a brand in 1998. a&o objected and wanted the brand to be deleted, claiming that the word "Jugendherberge" is too common to be protected. Finally, in 2009 the Federal Patent Court of Germany decided that "Jugendherberge" should be deleted from the brand register.

In 2017, the Investment company TPG Capital purchased the majority of the company shares. Since a&o has been acquired by TPG, they massively reinforced their expansion plans. The company published a list of 25 cities in Europe, where new hostels shall be opened in the near future. Besides nine locations in A&O's core markets Germany and Austria, the list also contains cities in Ireland, Scotland, England, the Netherlands, France, Spain, Portugal, Italy, Hungary, Poland, Sweden, and Switzerland.

== Properties ==
Countries served by A&O Hotels and Hostels (May 2025)

=== Current locations ===
As of 2025, A&O maintains one or more locations in 30 cities in 10 European countries.

Name	Country	Opened
Berlin Friedrichshain	Germany	2000
Berlin Mitte	Germany	2004
Munich Hauptbahnhof	Germany	2005
Hamburg Hammer Kirche	Germany	2005
Munich Hackerbrücke	Germany	2006
Hamburg Hauptbahnhof	Germany	2007
Dresden Hauptbahnhof	Germany	2007
Leipzig Hauptbahnhof	Germany	2008
Vienna Stadthalle	Austria	2008
Hamburg Reeperbahn	Germany	2009
Düsseldorf Hauptbahnhof	Germany	2009
Cologne Neumarkt	Germany	2009
Berlin Hauptbahnhof	Germany	2010
Cologne Dom	Germany	2011
Nuremberg Hauptbahnhof	Germany	2011
Dortmund Hauptbahnhof	Germany	2011
Hamburg City	Germany	2012
Graz Hauptbahnhof	Austria	2013
Vienna Hauptbahnhof	Austria	2013
Frankfurt Galluswarte (Messe)	Germany	2013
Aachen Hauptbahnhof	Germany	2014
Weimar	Germany	2014
Munich Laim	Germany	2014
Amsterdam Zuidoost (Bijlmer)	Netherlands	2015
Stuttgart City	Germany	2015
Berlin Kolumbus	Germany	2015
Cologne Hauptbahnhof	Germany	2016
Salzburg Hauptbahnhof	Austria	2016
Copenhagen Nørrebro	Denmark	2017
Venice Mestre	Italy	2017
Bremen Hauptbahnhof	Germany	2017
Frankfurt Ostend	Germany	2018
Prague Rhea	Czech Republic	2018
Warsaw Wola	Poland	2020
Budapest City	Hungary	2020
Copenhagen Sydhavn	Denmark	2020
Edinburgh City	United Kingdom	2021
Rotterdam City	Netherlands	2022
Brighton Beach	United Kingdom	2024
Antwerp Centraal	Belgium	2024
Brussels Centrum	Belgium	2025
Florence Campo di Marte	Italy	2025
Milano Ca Granda	Italy	2025
London Docklands Riverside	United Kingdom	2025

=== Former locations ===
Name	Country	Operated
Berlin Zoo	Germany	2002-2012
Prague Holešovice (Franchise)	Czech Republic	2005-2012
Prague Metro Strizkov	Czech Republic	2012-2022
Karlsruhe Hauptbahnhof	Germany	2012-2018
Salzburg Wolfgang's (Management contract)	Austria	2019-2023
Venice Mestre II	Italy	2019-2022
