= Edward Asselbergs =

Edward Anton Maria Asselbergs
- Born: 1927; Netherlands
- Died: 1996 (aged 68–69)
- Education: University of Guelph; University of Toronto; Cornell University
- Occupation: Food chemist
- Known for: Inventing the modern process for instant mashed potato flakes

Edward Anton Maria Asselbergs (1927–1996) was a Dutch-Canadian food chemist famous for inventing the modern process of producing instant mashed potato flakes.

He was raised in the Netherlands where he received his undergraduate degree, but fled to Canada with his family during the second World War. He received a master's degree from Guelph and the University of Toronto and a doctorate from Cornell. His 1955 thesis was "studies on ascorbic acid synthesis in apple leaves" (Cornell: 1955, 304 pages).

In 1960, while working for the Canadian Department of Agriculture in Ottawa (Agriculture Canada), he developed a process of making instant mashed potato flakes, and filed a patent on the process (Canadian patent 3260607, July 1966). The product reached the market in 1962. Another of his inventions at the time was an infrared apple peeler.

He later worked for the Food and Agriculture Organization of the United Nations, moving to Italy where he became chief of the technical division, an important component of the Green Revolution. He retired in 1985.

He has 5 children, two girls and three boys.
