= Jaquelin Hume Foundation =

The Jaquelin Hume Foundation is a 501(c)(3) organization "support[ing] free-market solutions to education reform," and funds many right-wing and libertarian organizations. Established in 1962 and headquartered in San Francisco, California. Businessman Jaquelin Hume began financing various free-market policies and started focusing its money more specifically in education reform "including charter schools, vouchers, standards and curricula,". It has granted donations to the Center for Education Reform, the State Policy Network, the Institute for Justice, the Alliance for School Choice, and the Association of American Educators.

The foundation was created by Jaquelin Hume, a man whom "championed free-market ideals through education and public policy funding". In his earlier years, Hume also helped create the Foundation for Teaching Economics. This focused on teaching high school students and economic teachers about free marketing. Another organization Hume helped to create was in support of anti-Communism, called the Campaign for America. After Hume died, his foundation continued to focus on the same ideals. However, the trustees of the foundation soon realized that their wide range of philanthropies was not making a big impact on society. The foundation then started to focus only on education, which they believe is very important. The foundation focuses on reforming schools, and encouraging people to create a change.
