= Discovery Museum (Netherlands) =

Museum in Limburg, Netherlands

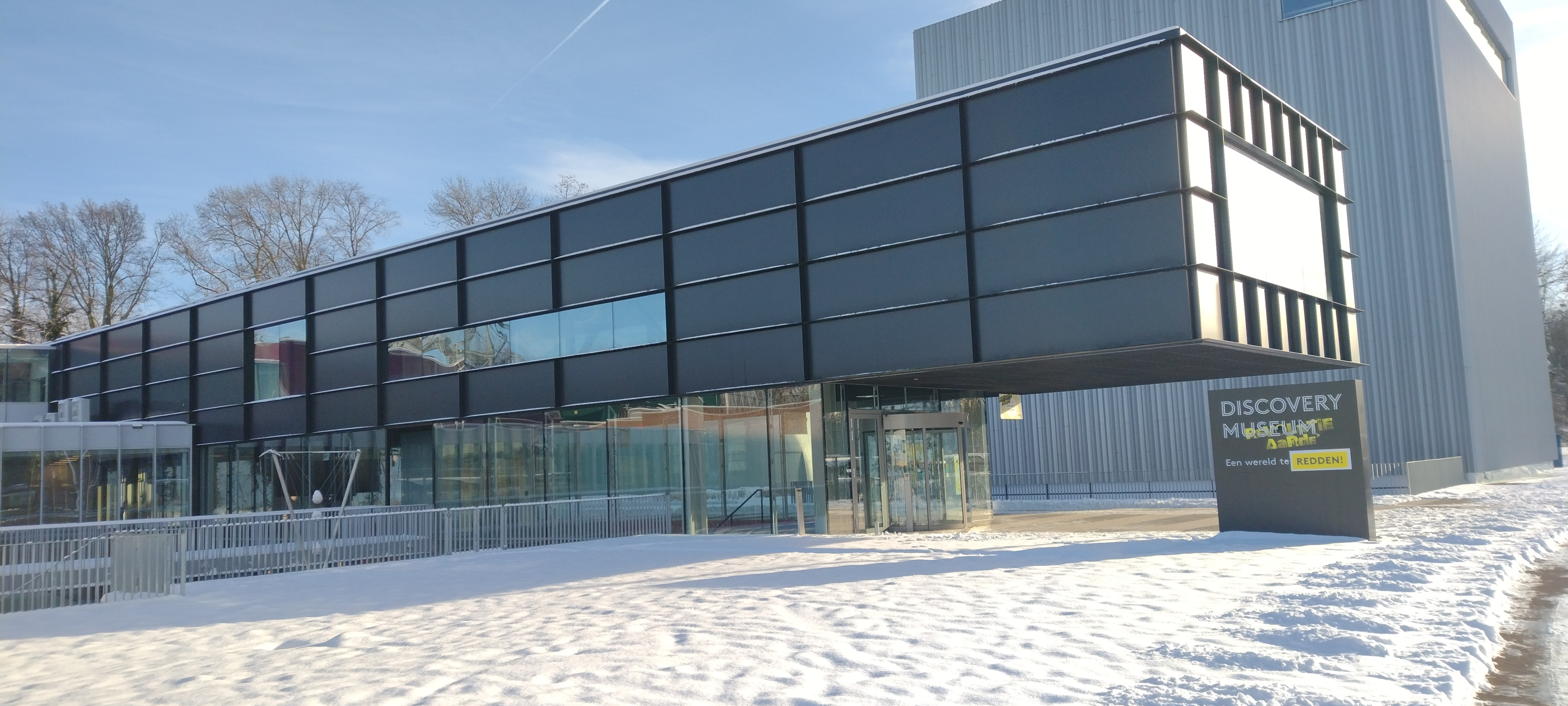
- Entrance
- Established: 1998
- Location: Museumplein 2, 6461 MA Kerkrade, Netherlands
- Coordinates: 50.8613°N 6.0586°E
- Type: Science and industry museum
- Website: discoverymuseum.nl

Discovery Museum is a provincial science- and industry-based museum in Kerkrade, Netherlands, that explores the connections between people, industry, science, technology, and society. The center combines elements of a science museum and an industrial heritage museum, aiming to show how scientific and technological developments influence everyday life and the environment.

== History ==
The museum opened in 1998 as Industrion, with an emphasis on the industrial history of the region, especially glass and ceramic manufacture, coal mining and its effects on society. It had taken over the collections of the previous local mining museum. It also had a particular focus on one glass manufacturer, Kristalunie in Maastricht. Its history has been described in the context of "technical museums".

In 2009, the institution adopted the name Continium Discovery Center, expanding its focus to include a wider range of scientific and technological themes. This change marked a shift from a historical museum to a center for science and discovery, featuring interactive exhibits. The aim was to use emerging social media sites and other internet sites, such as Twitter and Wikipedia, to enrich visits.

In 2015, the museum became part of Museumplein Limburg, a complex that also houses the Cube Design Museum and Columbus Earth Center, and the site was officially opened by King Willem-Alexander. Over time, the museum introduced new technologies, such as immersive theater experiences, to trace the history of the earth and possible futures. The name changed from Continium Discovery Center to Discovery Museum in 2021 to reflect the merger with the other two museums.

== Programs ==
A range of programs and exhibits connect visitors with science and technology. The museum features hands-on exhibits, interactive displays, and thematic installations that explore both historical and contemporary topics. One of the notable attractions is the Time Warp Theater, which uses a simulator system to take visitors on a journey through the history of the earth, from the Big Bang to possible futures. The museum also hosts temporary exhibitions on current scientific and technological topics, and runs outreach activities such as the Science Truck, which aims to engage the public in dialogue about science and its role in society. The center’s programs are designed to encourage participation and critical thinking about the ways people use and shape technology in their daily lives.
