= Hawaii Children's Discovery Center =

- Location within Hawaii
- Established: 1989
- Location: Honolulu, Hawaii, United States
- Coordinates: 21.293613°N 157.862072°W
- Type: Children's museum
- Director: Loretta Yajima
- Public transit access: TheBus (Honolulu) lines 19, 20, 42, 55, 56, 57, 57A, 65, 88A
- Website: discoverycenterhawaii.org

Hawaii Children's Discovery Center is a children's museum located near Honolulu, Hawaii's Kaka'ako Waterfront Park. Founded in 1989, the 38,000 sq ft (3,500 m^{2}) museum receives over 200,000 visits from children and their families every year.

It is a non-profit organization with tax-exempt status, and a member of the Association of Children's Museums.

== History ==
Hawaii Children's Discovery Center opened as Hawaii Children’s Museum of Art, Culture, Science and Technology in December 1989 at a 5,000 sq ft (460 m^{2}) storefront location at the Dole Food Company cannery in Honolulu's Iwilei industrial neighborhood.

The original museum closed in 1994, having served about 250,000 visitors, following the cannery's closure in 1991.

In 1998, the museum re-opened as Hawaii Children's Discovery Center at the renovated and expanded site of the old Kewalo incinerator under a 40-year lease with the Hawaii Community Development Authority (HCDA). To prepare the site, which had been abandoned since 1977 when the incinerator could not satisfy higher air pollution standards, the HCDA spent $2 million USD gutting the incinerator, removing lead and asbestos, oil tanks and furnaces and stabilizing the structure according to current building code. New construction added 20,000 square feet to the existing 17,000-square-foot facility.

== Present ==
The mission of the museum is to inspire children to 'dream big dreams' and to know that dreams can, indeed, come true. Its six fixed exhibits provide an environment that encourages children to use their senses to gain a better understanding of the world around them:

- Tot Spot is an area for children 5-years and younger to enjoy a stimulating and sensory-filled environment.
- Fantastic You helps children learn how the different parts of your body work together.
- Your Town teaches children how a community functions through role-playing as a firefighter, banker, a mechanic, an art performer.
- Hawaiian Rainbows explains history of Hawaii from the plantation days to modern Hawaii.
- Your Rainbow World teaches about cultures, countries and celebrations outside of Hawaii by letting children experience how life is similar and different in other parts of the world.
- Rainforest Adventures, the Center's newest exhibit gallery, teaches children about the importance of rainforests in Hawaii and all around the world.

Hawaii Children's Discovery Center hosts a variety of themed programs:

- Toddler Time helps 18-36 month children develop language and sensory perception
- Preschool Playtime, for 3- and 4-year-olds, is a drop-off program offering children a first-time preschool classroom experience
- STEM-centered labs
- Several programs designed especially for US-based Scouting organizations
- Discovery Camps four times a year during school breaks

== Support ==
Hawaii Children's Discovery Center is supported through member contributions, sponsorships, foundation and federal grants, and the support of generous individuals.

While the museum has a full-time staff, it depends on volunteers at every level of the organization.
