= Gary Farrell =

California winemaker

Gary Farrell (born 1952) is a California winemaker, specializing in the production of Pinot noir and Chardonnay from Sonoma County’s Russian River Valley. His winemaking career began in 1978 as winemaker at Davis Bynum Winery in Healdsburg, but in later years made wine for other wineries as well. In 1982, he released his first wine under his "namesake" Gary Farrell label - a 1982 Russian River Valley Pinot Noir from the Rochioli Vineyard. He owned a winemaking facility in Healdsburg.

== Early life and education ==
Farrell was born in Pasadena, California on April 20, 1952. He studied Political Science and Criminal Law at Sonoma State University in 1970. This relocation to Sonoma County placed him in one of California's wine regions, and he began a career in wine production.

== Career ==
Farrell's early mentors included Joe Rochioli, Robert Stemmler, Davis Bynum and Tom Dehlinger. After several years as an apprentice, he took the head-winemaker position at Davis Bynum Winery in 1978. Soon thereafter, he produced inaugural releases for Rochioli Winery, Limerick Lane and Moshin Vineyards.

During the mid-1990s, Farrell purchased land and developed Starr Ridge and Cresta Ridge vineyards. In 1998, he built his new Pinot noir winemaking facility on a hilltop near Healdsburg.

In 2004, Farrell sold the “Gary Farrell” brand and winery to Allied Domecq. Today the winery is owned by Bill Price, the managing partner of Kistler Vineyard and owner of Three Sticks and The Adobe, Lutum and the Durell and Gap’s Crown vineyards; and a group of investors including Pete Scott, the former CFO of Beringer Wine Estates; and Walt Klenz; former president and CEO of Beringer Wine Estates.

In 2007, he partnered with longtime colleague Bill Hambrecht to micro-produce Pinot noir and Chardonnay under the new Alysian label, however 2011 was his last vintage with this brand.
