= Garden State Discovery Museum =

Coordinates: 39.912419°N 74.967012°W

- Established: 1994
- Dissolved: March 2020
- Location: Cherry Hill, New Jersey, U.S.
- Type: Children's museum
- Visitors: 250,000+ (annually)
- Director: Kelly Lyons

The Garden State Discovery Museum was a children's museum located in Cherry Hill, New Jersey.

== Overview ==
The museum was founded in 1994 and hosted over 150,000 visitors annually, providing various opportunities for infants to 10-year-olds and their adult companions. Some exhibits included:

- Under Construction – a two-story "unbuilt" playhouse
- Vet & Pet – an animal health-care clinic
- Rock Climbing Wall
- Silver Diner – a pretend restaurant with a kitchen, milkshake machine, and cash registers
- Check-Up – a pretend doctor's office
- Down the Shore – a pretend boat
- Farm Stand – a produce stand with fake fruit and vegetables
- Backstage Theater – includes a dressing room, costumes, sound system, and 100 seats
- Channel 6 Action News Studio – pretend news desk and camera provided by WPVI-TV
- Nature Center – includes tree house, giant spider web, and puppets
- Subaru Science Shop and Service Station – provided by Subaru of America
- Train Safety- a railroad simulator game developed by operation lifesaver of the dos and DONTS on railroad safety. Hosted by Tracks the animated railroad crossing signal.

In addition, the museum offered many educational classes for children as well as a drama and music program. All programs were free with admission.

The Garden State Discovery Museum permanently closed their doors in March 2020, shortly before the COVID-19 pandemic hit.

== Recognition ==
The Garden State Discovery Museum was listed as one of the top 50 children's museums in the United States by Parents magazine.
