= San Francisco University High School =

Coordinates: 37°47′27.58″N 122°26′43.72″W

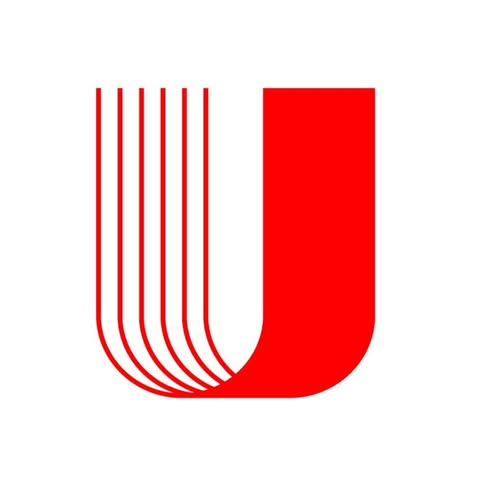

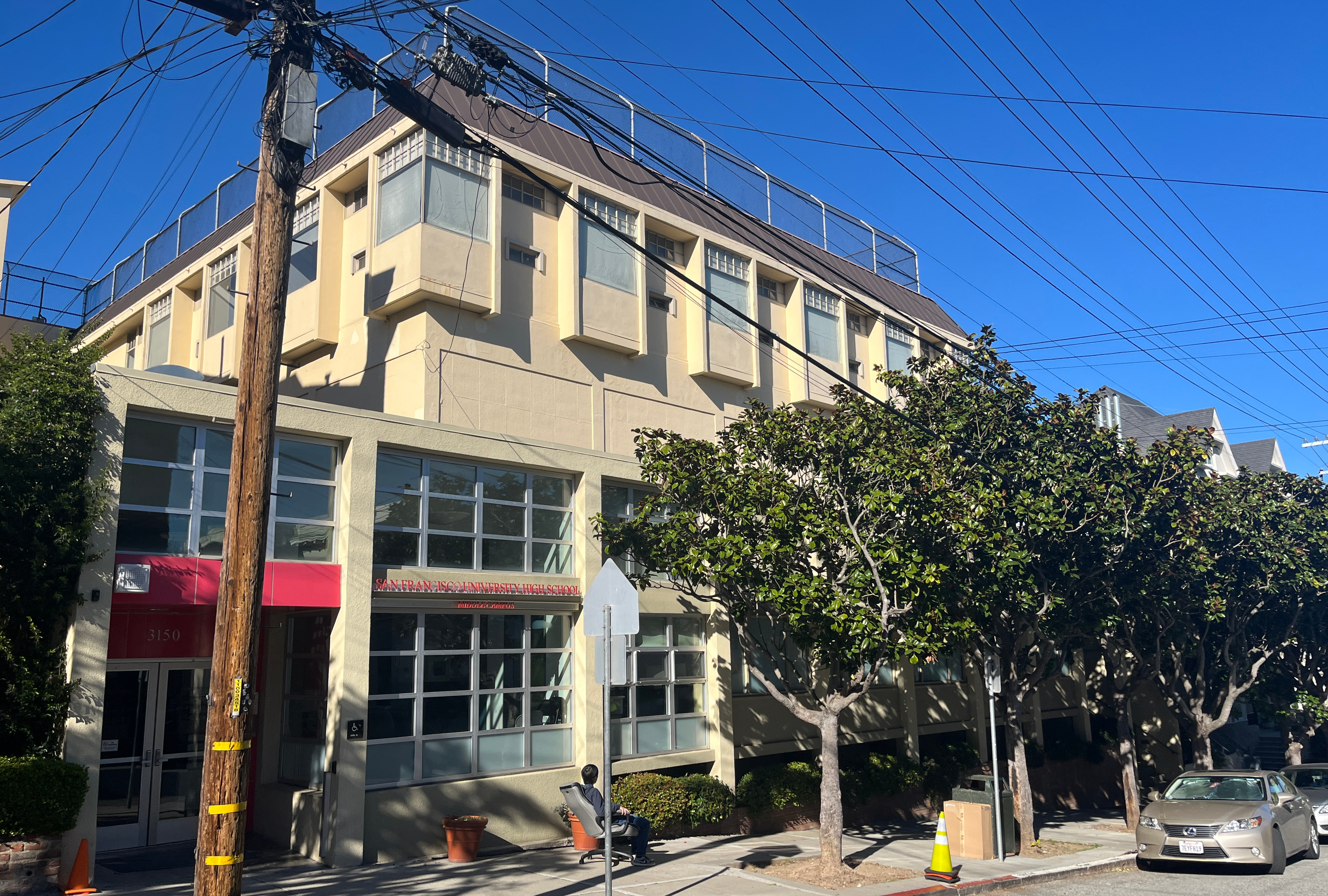
- University High School Middle Campus

Location
- 3065 Jackson Street; San Francisco, California 94115; USA

Information
- Former name: San Francisco Institute of Secondary Education
- Type: Private
- Opened: 1975
- Status: Active
- Head of School: Max Delgado
- Faculty: 75
- Grades: 9-12
- Gender: Coeducational
- Enrollment: 480 (2023–2024)
- Average class size: 14 students
- Student to teacher ratio: 7:1
- Campus: Urban
- Colors: Red, White
- Athletics: 42 teams across 20 different sports
- Mascot: Red Devils
- Accreditation: Western Association of Schools and Colleges
- Newspaper: The Devils' Advocate
- Yearbook: Retrospect
- Website: www.sfuhs.org

San Francisco University High School (UHS) is a private college preparatory high school located in San Francisco, California. The school was opened in 1975.

== Facilities and campus ==
The school is made up of five buildings, commonly referred to as Upper, Middle, Lower, South, and California campuses.

Upper Campus is the oldest and most historic part of campus. It was designed by Julia Morgan and built in 1917 to house Katherine Delmar Burke School, a girls' school, from the early part of the 20th century until 1975, when the building was sold to the newly created University High School. It houses the History and English Departments, College Counseling offices, and administrative offices. Middle Campus, connected to Upper Campus by a bridge, houses the school library; a 400-seat theater; the student center and cafeteria; state-of-the-art science labs; music rooms, including an electronic music recording room; and the Summerbridge program, UHS's pioneer program to help talented students from local public middle schools obtain the resources they might not have access to in their current schools. Lower Campus is home to the Math and Science Departments. It also holds the fitness center, changing rooms, gym, and athletic offices. Indoor sports are played at the gym, while field sports are mainly played at the nearby Paul Goode Field athletic complex. South Campus, which opened in the 2006–2007 school year, is the home of the Foreign Language Department and the Art Department. Additionally, South Campus contains a language lab, a large photography studio and darkroom, and art studios. California Campus is the most recent development, and it contains a new gym, a cafeteria, and new science labs and math rooms.

== Incidents ==
There was an investigation in 2021 into improper conduct between adults and students at the high school, involving, in particular, a former girls’ soccer coach.

== Notable alumni ==
=== Writers ===
- Ethan Canin, author
- Ben Casnocha, author
- Vendela Vida, author

=== Athletes ===
- Tyler Walker, MLB baseball player, San Francisco Giants
- Eileen Gu, Olympic freestyle skier and gold medalist

=== Artists and musicians ===
- Tauba Auerbach, artist
- Slater Bradley, video artist
- Ari Gold, filmmaker, actor, musician
- Hollis, musician
- John Morris, actor
- Nicky Sanders, musician (Steep Canyon Rangers)
- Sol Sender, graphic designer
- Deke Sharon, a cappella musician, producer
- Olivia Somerlyn, musician
- Maury Sterling, actor
- George Watsky, musician, poet, internet phenom
- Erin Cressida Wilson, playwright, screenwriter, author
- Ali Wong, comedian
- Basil Twist, puppeteer

=== Business ===
- Peter Saraf, film producer
- Robert Reffkin, co-founder and CEO of Compass, Inc.
- Adam Pritzker, co-founder of General Assembly, member of the Pritzker family
- Jennifer Dulski, founder and CEO of Rising Team, previously president and COO at Change.org and product leader at Google and Meta Platforms

=== Politics ===
- Daniel Lurie, mayor of San Francisco

== See also ==
- List of works by Julia Morgan
- San Francisco County high schools
- College-preparatory school
