= Association of American Educators =

Association of American Educators (AAE)
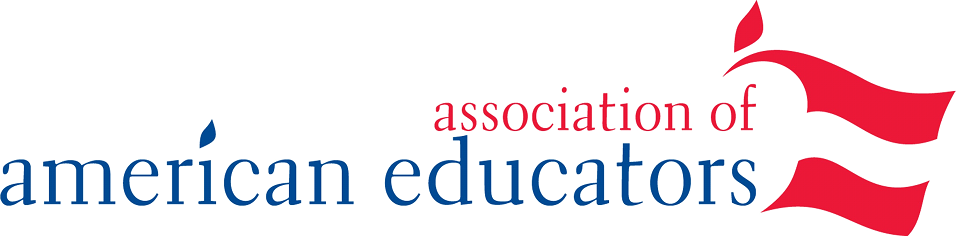
- Formation: 1994
- Headquarters: 27405 Puerta Real, S-230; Mission Viejo, California 92691
- Coordinates: 33.5650°N 117.6712°W
- Executive Director: Gary Beckner
- Website: www.aaeteachers.org

Association of American Educators (AAE) is a national, non-union, non-partisan professional educators association in the United States and is the fastest-growing association of its kind. Its stated mission is to “advance the profession through personal growth, professional development, teacher advocacy and protection.” AAE also seeks to “promote excellence in education so that [teachers] receive the respect, recognition and reward they deserve.” AAE is officially nonpartisan. AAE is not a union or a lobbying organization, but licensed as a 501(c)(6) professional trade association. AAE is funded by dues from thousands of members located in all fifty states and the District of Columbia and by contributions to the AAE Foundation, a 501(c)(3) charitable organization. AAE claims to “help lead a coalition of nearly 300,000 teachers across the country who have joined a non-union teacher association.”

According to its website, the AAE opposes collective bargaining, strikes, and engagement in policy issues not deemed "germane to education." The site also devotes a special section to denouncing "forced unionism" of public schoolteachers, including resources to help teachers resign union membership and nominal "Public Service Announcements" decrying teachers' unions for using "confrontational tactics" and union dues to pay for a "political agenda that has little to do with education."

== History ==
Original AAE logo

The Association of American Educators was founded in 1994 by Gary Beckner, his wife, and a group of nationally recognized educators, including three National Teachers of the Year, many of whom continue to serve on the AAE advisory board. Over 2,000 teachers joined AAE during their first year of operation, and membership doubled the following year.

While recruiting members directly through word-of-mouth, mailings, and at teacher conferences and new teacher orientations across the country, AAE has partnered with pre-existing state-based non-union educator associations in Louisiana and North Carolina. Additionally, AAE has established state-based non-union educator associations representing teachers in Arkansas, Colorado, Idaho, Kansas, Oregon, Virginia, and Washington. AAE also partners with county- and district-level associations in other states, including Nevada.

AAE is headquartered in Mission Viejo, California. In 2004, AAE opened an office in Alexandria, Virginia, as its headquarters for policy, outreach, and communications.

AAE has been highlighted in national newspapers The Wall Street Journal, The Washington Times, and USA Today, among others. Op-eds and letters to the editor from AAE staff members are published regularly in local newspapers. AAE staff, state leaders, and members have been interviewed on CNN Headline News, Fox News Channel, and many local news media outlets.

== Membership ==
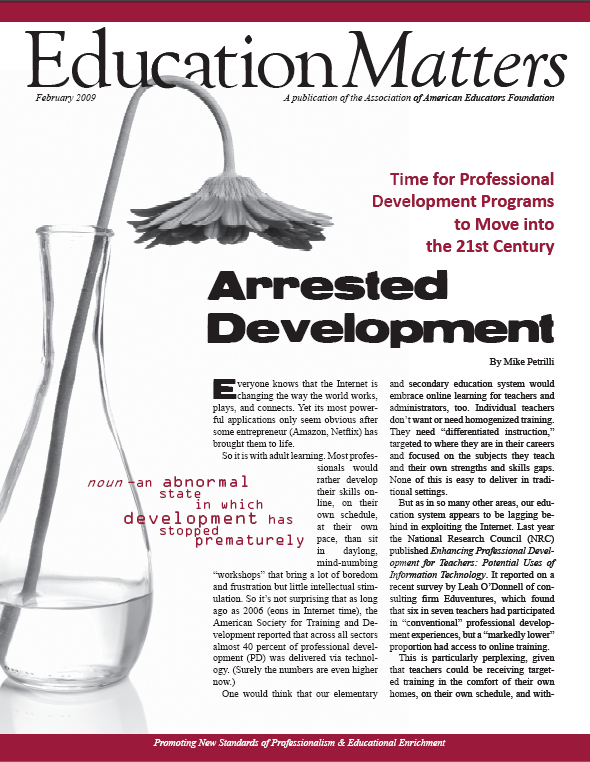
February 2009 cover of Education Matters

Professional membership in AAE is open to all employees who, in order to qualify for insurance benefits, must receive a W-2 from an educational entity, including public or private school, university, or college. Non-insurance membership is open to everyone.

More than 90% of AAE members are public school teachers.

According to the AAE website and membership brochures, membership includes “professional members”, "student teachers," "retired educators," and "AAE supporters."

== State partners and affiliates ==
AAE membership is available to educators in all fifty states and the District of Columbia; however, members who teach in a state with an AAE state partner (see below) join and receive benefits from the state partner.

Group	Acronym	State(s)	Website
Arkansas State Teachers Association	ASTA	Arkansas	astapro.org
Kansas Association of American Educators	KANAAE	Kansas	kanaae.org
Northwest Professional Educators	NWPE	Idaho; Oregon; Washington	nwpe.org
Professional Association of Colorado Educators	PACE	Colorado	coloradoteachers.org

== Criticism ==
The National Education Association (NEA), the largest labor union in the United States, and its state affiliates, have accused AAE and its state affiliates of being "pro-voucher" "anti-public education" and "anti-union." The NEA cites as evidence that major contributors to AAE Foundation have also contributed to school choice initiatives, which the NEA labels as "anti-public education" and "anti-union." The NEA has distributed a "toolkit" advising local members on how to respond to the AAE, including talking points and action plans. The NEA has labeled AAE "the leading anti-NEA organization."

AAE and state affiliates have responded by highlighting that over 90% of their membership are public school teachers and the AAE has never taken a position supporting vouchers. AAE has supported school choice, although their activities for National School Choice Week primarily involve public charter school teachers, never vouchers. Also, the major funders cited by the NEA as proof of AAE's agenda, have also given grants, albeit of much smaller value, to public school districts and universities. For example, the Walton Family Foundation donates heavily to public charter schools and groups focused on influencing policy toward school choice, including vouchers, but also granted some money to a few public school districts as well as Teach for America and the United Negro College Fund.

== Photo gallery ==
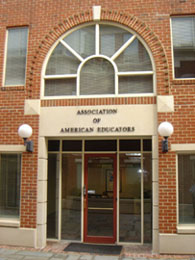
Alexandria, Virginia office of AAE

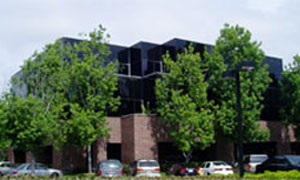
Mission Viejo, California office of AAE
