= Breakthrough Collaborative =

- Founded: 1978
- Founder: Lois Loofbourrow
- Type: Education
- Location: San Francisco, California, U.S.
- Website: www.breakthroughcollaborative.org

Breakthrough Collaborative (formerly Summerbridge National) is the umbrella organization of a collaborative of programs across the United States that aim to effect positive change in urban schools.

The organization runs year-round afterschool academic tutoring as well as two 6-week-long intense summer academic programs for underserved and underrepresented middle school students, which provide courses in English literature, science, social studies, mathematics, and foreign language.

Around 5,400 students go through the program per year.

A study conducted by Stanford University found that students who took part in the program performed better academically than those who did not, and that 85 percent of Breakthrough Collaborative students went on to pursue higher education at a college or university. Bayer Corporation recognized the program in their 2010 Compendium of Best Practice K-12 STEM Education Programs.

== About ==
Breakthrough offers high-potential, under-served middle school students the opportunity to participate in rigorous academic enrichment programs throughout the summer and school year. Students make a commitment to participate in the program through middle school and high school and in turn, Breakthrough provides many services to students and their families, ranging from academic enrichment to one-on-one tutoring to high school and college preparation. Additionally, all Breakthrough classes are taught by talented, high-achieving high school and college students from around the country who are interested in the field of education. Through the teacher development program offered by Breakthrough, these young educators become potential candidates for professional teaching and educational leadership positions after college. Teaching at Breakthrough has been named a Top Ten Internship in America by the Princeton Review, as well as other prestigious national organizations, and a 1999 Stanford University report stated that "72% [of Breakthrough teachers] went on to work in other educationally related careers or internships after teaching at a Breakthrough site."

== History ==
Breakthrough was founded in 1978 by Lois Loofbourrow at San Francisco University High School. Since then, numerous sites have opened, all in various sized urban areas. The sites are joined together under the umbrella organization, Breakthrough Collaborative, based in San Francisco. Sites function either through public-private partnerships with an independent educational institution or maintain their own 501(c)3 status.

Since its inception in 1978, Breakthrough programs around the world have generated over 30,000 student and teaching Fellow alumni across all 50 states and in 20 countries. In 2003, the Summerbridge/Breakthrough Alumni Network or SBAN was formed through the efforts of alumni.

In March 2006, the 22 host schools of Breakthrough programs were awarded the Klingenstein Leadership Award by the Klingenstein Center at Teachers College, Columbia University. Breaking from the tradition of giving this prestigious award to an individual, 26 independent schools received the 2006 award. Past recipients include William Durden, Diane Ravitch, Robert Coles, and Howard Gardner. In 2007, the Johns Hopkins University Center for Summer Learning awarded Breakthrough Collaborative and its affiliate site in Pittsburgh, with the Excellence in Summer Learning Award for exemplary mission, performance, and infrastructure in out-of-school academic support.

== List of Breakthrough programs ==
Breakthrough programs are offered in the following locations:

- Breakthrough Atlanta, Atlanta (at The Lovett School)
- Breakthrough Central Texas, Austin (Austin ISD students at University of Texas at Austin and at St Andrews Episcopal School, Manor Independent School District students at a Manor ISD campus)
- Breakthrough Birmingham, Birmingham (at Hayes K-8 School)
- Breakthrough Greater Boston, Cambridge and Boston (at Cambridge Rindge and Latin School)
- Breakthrough Cincinnati, Cincinnati, OH (at Cincinnati Country Day School and University of Cincinnati)
- Breakthrough Kent Denver, Denver, CO (at Kent Denver School)
- Breakthrough Fort Worth, Fort Worth (at Fort Worth Country Day School)
- Breakthrough Houston, Houston, TX (at Episcopal High School and St. John's School)
- Summerbridge Louisville, Louisville, KY (at Louisville Collegiate (Louisville, KY))
- Breakthrough Manchester, Manchester (at The Derryfield School)
- Breakthrough Miami, Miami (at Ransom Everglades School, Carrollton School of the Sacred Heart, Miami Country Day School, Palmer Trinity School, Gulliver prep.)
- Breakthrough Minneapolis at The Blake School, Minneapolis (at The Blake School)
- Breakthrough New Orleans, New Orleans (at Isidore Newman School)
- Breakthrough New York, Manhattan and Brooklyn (at The Town School and Bishop Loughlin Memorial High School)
- Breakthrough Norfolk, Norfolk (at Norfolk Academy)
- Breakthrough of Greater Philadelphia, Philadelphia (at Germantown Friends School)
- Breakthrough Pittsburgh, Pittsburgh (at Sewickley Academy)
- Breakthrough Providence, Providence (at Wheeler School)
- Breakthrough Sacramento, Sacramento (at Sacramento Country Day School)
- Breakthrough Twin Cities, Minneapolis and St. Paul (at Mounds Park Academy and St. Paul Central)
- Breakthrough San Francisco, San Francisco (at San Francisco Day School)
- Breakthrough Summerbridge, San Francisco (at San Francisco University High School)
- Breakthrough San Juan Capistrano, San Juan Capistrano (at St. Margaret's Episcopal School)
- Breakthrough Santa Fe, Sante Fe (at Santa Fe Preparatory School)
- Breakthrough Silicon Valley, San Jose (at Herbert Hoover Middle School)
