= Bay Area Discovery Museum =

Children's museum in Sausalito, California

Coordinates: 37.836005°N 122.476813°W

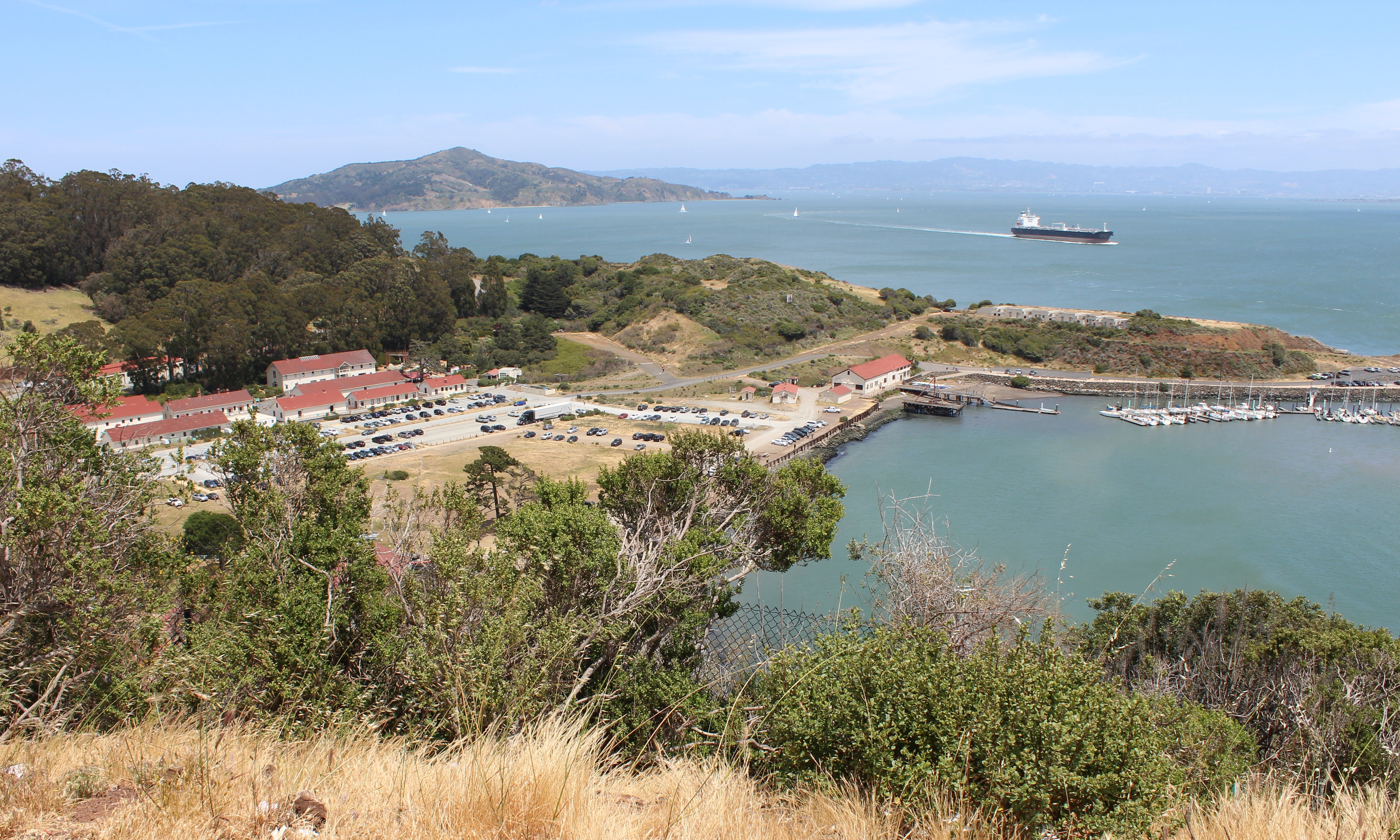
Bay Area Discovery Museum

The Bay Area Discovery Museum is a children's museum located in Sausalito, California inside the Golden Gate National Recreation Area, which is right at the foot of the Golden Gate Bridge. It was founded in 1987.

The museum is geared to children from 6 months to 10 years of age with different areas of the museum tailored to a specific age group. Children have the options of exploring the 6 different sections of the museum: Art Studios, Bay Hall, Discovery Hall, Lookout Cove, Tot Spot, and Fab Lab.

In the fall of 2021, the museum completed a $20M USD renovation that included five new exhibits including an interconnected set of tree houses shaped like the nuts of the trees they inhabit.
