= Instant mashed potatoes =

Dehydrated mashed potatoes reconstituted by adding water or milk

A modern package of instant mashed potatoes

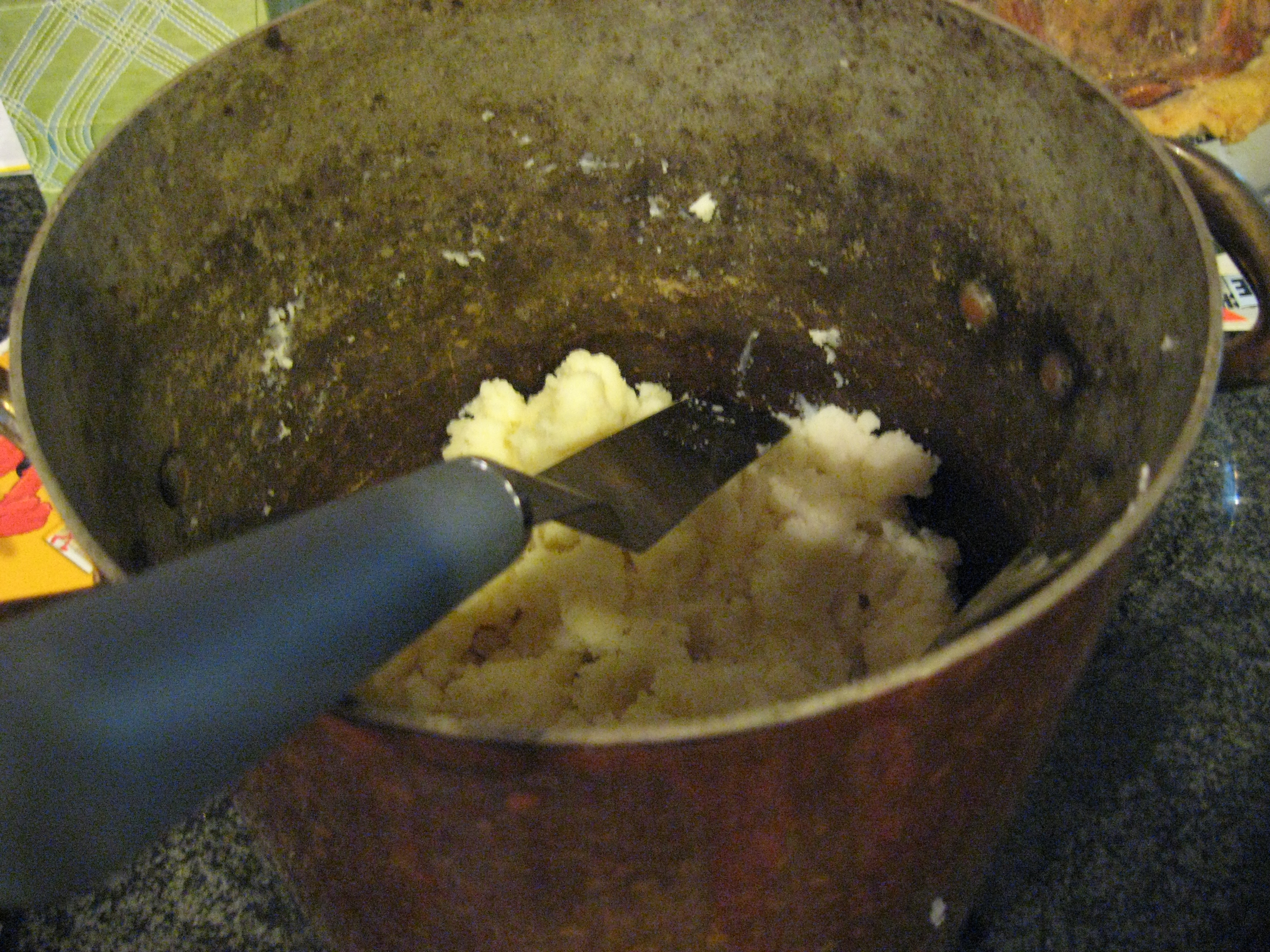
Instant mashed potatoes

Instant mashed potatoes are potatoes that have been through an industrial process of cooking, mashing and dehydrating to yield a packaged convenience food that can be reconstituted by adding hot water or milk or both, producing an approximation of mashed potatoes. They are available in many different flavors.

Mashed potatoes can be reconstituted from potato flour, but the process is made more difficult by lumping; a key characteristic of instant mashed potatoes is that it is in the form of flakes or granules, eliminating the chunkiness. Analogous to instant mashed potatoes are instant poi made from taro and instant fufu made from yams or yam substitutes including cereals. Poha, an instant rice mush, is also much in the same spirit, as more broadly are other instant porridges, formed from flakes, granules, or pearls to avoid lumping. Brands include Smash and Idahoan Foods.

Flaked instant mashed potatoes are most commonly found in stores in the United States, Mexico and Canada. Granulated forms are generally reserved more for institutional or restaurant use.

== History ==
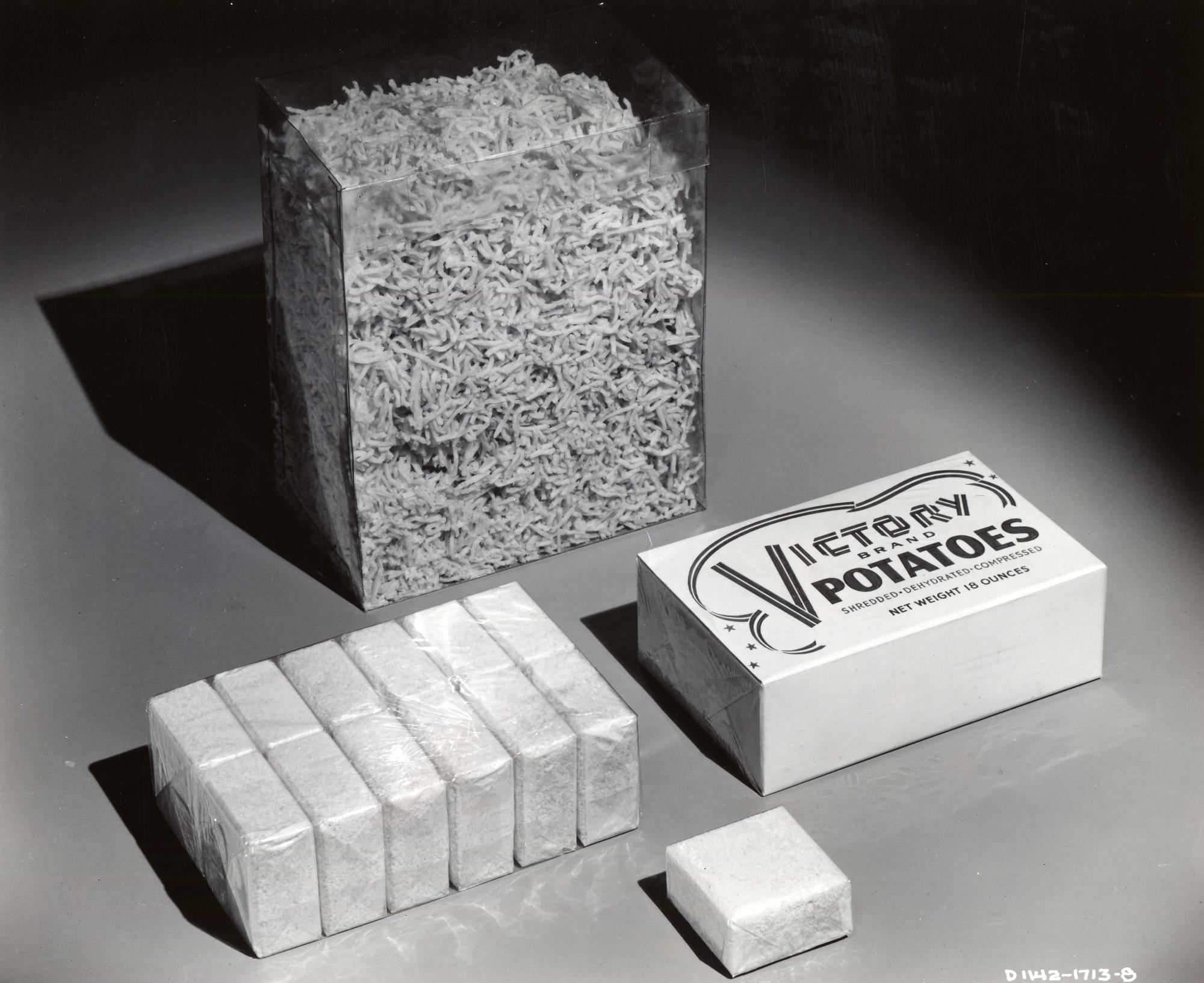
Dehydrated shredded potatoes, circa 1940.

The practice of drying starchy root vegetables for preservation and portability is widely attested around the world, and likely dates back to before the advent of agriculture. Potatoes in particular have been freeze dried since at least the time of the Inca Empire, in the form of chuño; another example is in Japanese Ainu cuisine, where potatoes are collected frozen from the ground in spring, then dried.

U.S. Patent 1025373, developed by Ernest William Cooke, titled "Dehydrate Potatoes and Process of Preparing the Same", and describing a product that was to be reconstituted in hot water, was applied for in 1905 and granted in 1912.

Flake-form instant mashed potatoes date back at least to 1954, when two United States Department of Agriculture researchers were issued a patent for "Drum drying of cooked mashed potatoes" (U.S. Patent 2,759,832), which describes the end product specifically being "as a thin sheet or flake".

In 1962, Canadian scientist Edward A. Asselbergs was issued U.S. Patent 3,260,607, entitled "Preparation of dehydrated cooked mashed potato", for a particular industrial method of producing the product.

== Nutrition ==
Instant mashed potatoes have substantially more sodium than fresh potatoes, and much less dietary fiber. In other respects they are similar to mashed fresh potatoes in their nutritional qualities, about two-thirds starch by dry weight, with smaller amounts of protein, dietary fiber, and vitamins. The largest difference is the loss of vitamin C, although some products may be enriched to compensate. One hundred grams (3½ oz) of unenriched instant mashed potatoes provides 11% of the Dietary Reference Intake of vitamin C, compared to 18% provided by the fresh potato version.

== Other uses ==
- Thickening agent in gravy, soups and sauces
- Sourdough starter
- Substitute for bread crumbs

== See also ==
- List of instant foods
- List of dried foods
