= San Francisco Day School =

Location
- 350 Masonic Avenue; San Francisco, CA; USA; 37°46′41″N 122°26′47″W

Information
- Type: Private, day school
- Religious affiliation: Nonsectarian
- Established: 1981
- Head of School: Dr. Racheal Adriko (2023-present)
- Faculty: 68
- Grades: K-8
- Gender: Co-ed
- Enrollment: 421 students
- Student to teacher ratio: 6:1
- Schedule: Semester
- Campus type: Urban
- Colors: Green and white
- Mascot: Dolphin
- Tuition: $43,712/year K-8 (2024-2025)
- Affiliation: California Association of Independent Schools (CAIS); Educational Records Bureau (ERB); San Francisco Independent School Athletic League
- Website: sfday.org
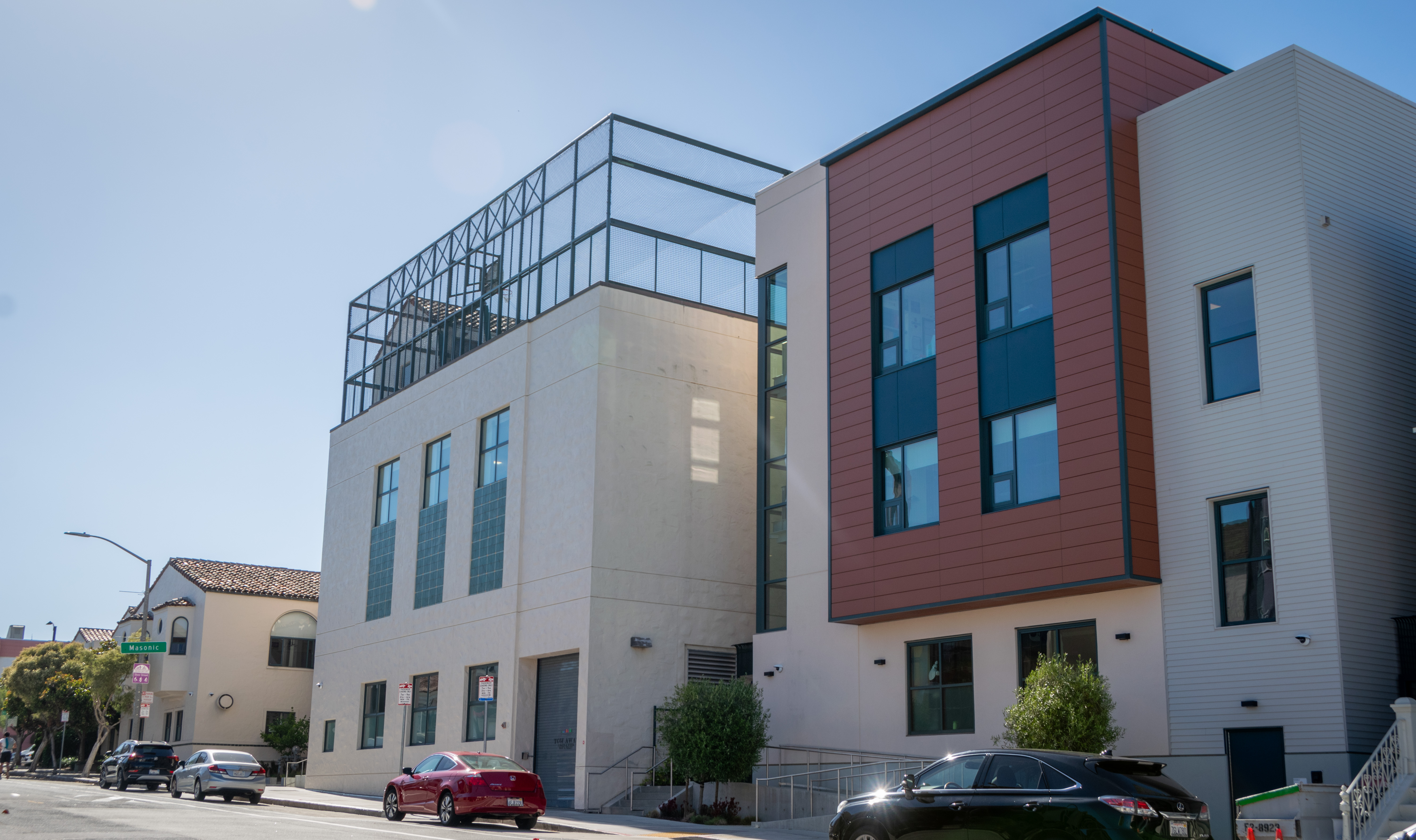
- Golden Gate Ave. facade of the school

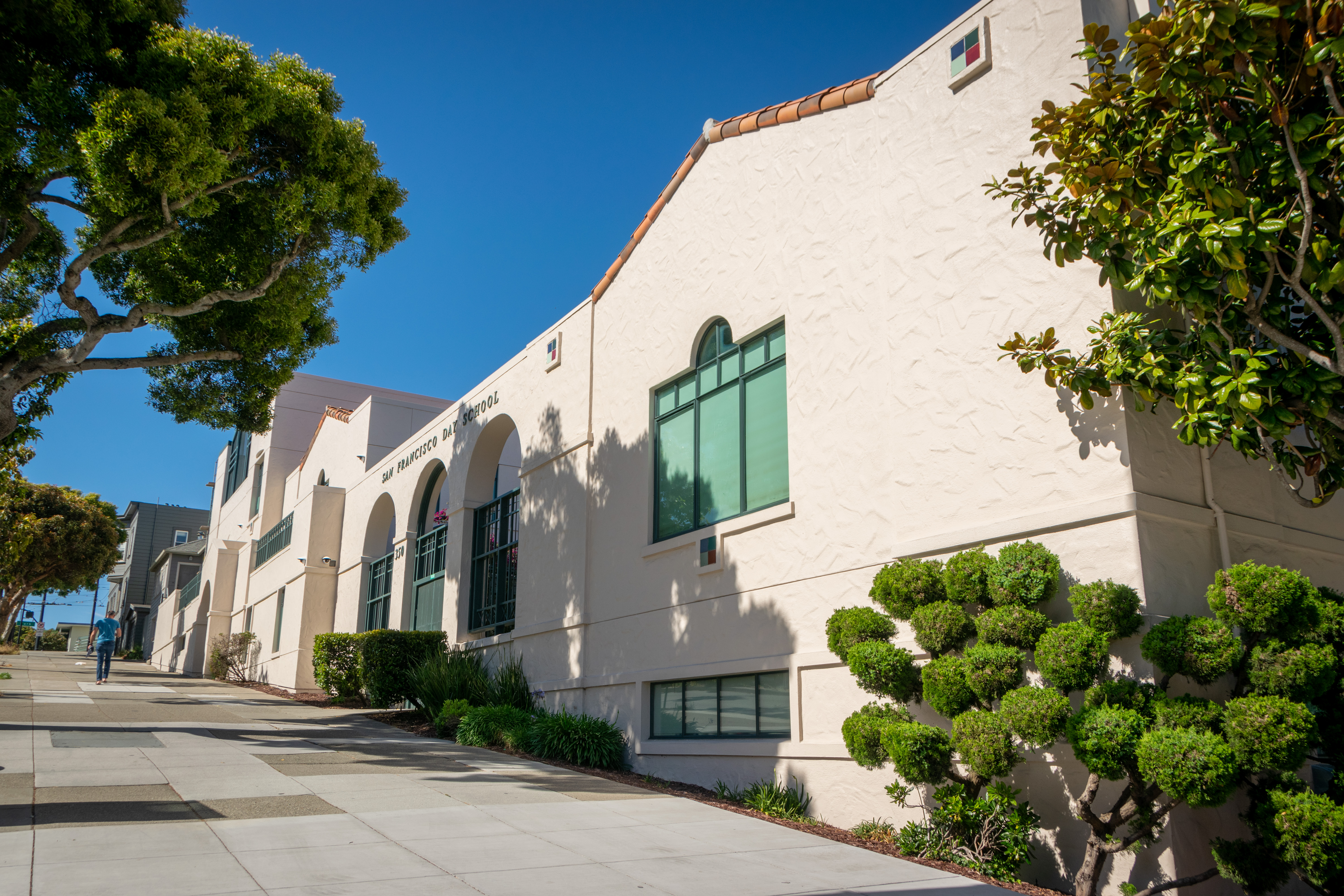
- Masonic Ave. facade of the school

San Francisco Day School (SFDS or SF Day) is a private, co-educational day school for kindergarten through 8th grade in San Francisco, California, established 1981. Accordingly, SFDS is a highly competitive feeder school academically preparing students for boarding schools and other specialized high schools.

== Overview ==
The school serves 421 students from K-8 under current Head of School, Dr. Racheal Adriko (who joined in August 2023). SFDS is one of (if not) the only private, nonsectarian schools in the city to not require language immersion or specialty-focused student body, for a well-rounded education and student life.

== Academics ==
Students in grades 3-8 take the annual Educational Records Bureau (ERB) Comprehensive Testing Program (CTP) for individual, class, and national comparison, then some take the SSAT as a feeder school for high school admissions to schools who require it.

=== Service learning ===
Since 1993, SFDS has served as the Breakthrough Collaborative San Francisco partner, helping under-served community students with application-based, tuition-free academic enrichment and a pathway to college (90% being first-generation college students). The school, students, and parents donate funding, time, and physical resources to tackle educational inequality.

== Campus ==
SFDS recently completed a campus expansion which has a theatre, art room, music room, rooftop garden, and housing for teachers. This expansion also includes a renovated outdoor space.
