= Basic American Foods =

American food corporation

Basic American Foods is an American food corporation. The company, which is privately owned, claims three-quarters of the North American dehydrated potato granule market.

== Overview ==
It was started in 1933 by Jaquelin H. Hume and his brother Bill Hume as a dehydration processing plant in Vacaville, California. In the 1950s, they established a potato processing plant in Blackfoot, Idaho, whereby potato powder could be turned into mashed potatoes by adding boiling water. This technique was used by brands such as Potato Pearls, Golden Grill, Classic Casserole and Savory Series. In 1986, they invented the same technique for beans, for brands such as Santiago Refried Beans and later Santiago Black Beans and Santiago Quick-Start Chili. The company holds forty patents for food production.

Basic American Foods competes with General Mills, Pillsbury and Sunspiced, Inc. The company, however, had an agreement with General Mills for it to manufacture the dehydrated potato products that it sells under its Betty Crocker brand. During the 1990s, Basic American Foods also acquired Pillsbury’s entire food service business, including its facility at Shelley, Idaho.

Basic American Foods is led by Jaquelin's sons, William J. Hume and George H. Hume. It is headquartered in Walnut Creek, California. The company is one of the original members of a consortium led by Avure Technologies formed for the Department of Defense Dual Use S&T (DUST) program.
