= List of Scottish poets =

This is a list of Scottish poets in English, Scottish Gaelic, Scots, Latin, French, Old Norse, Old Welsh and other languages. This lists includes poets who lived in what is now Scotland before it became so.

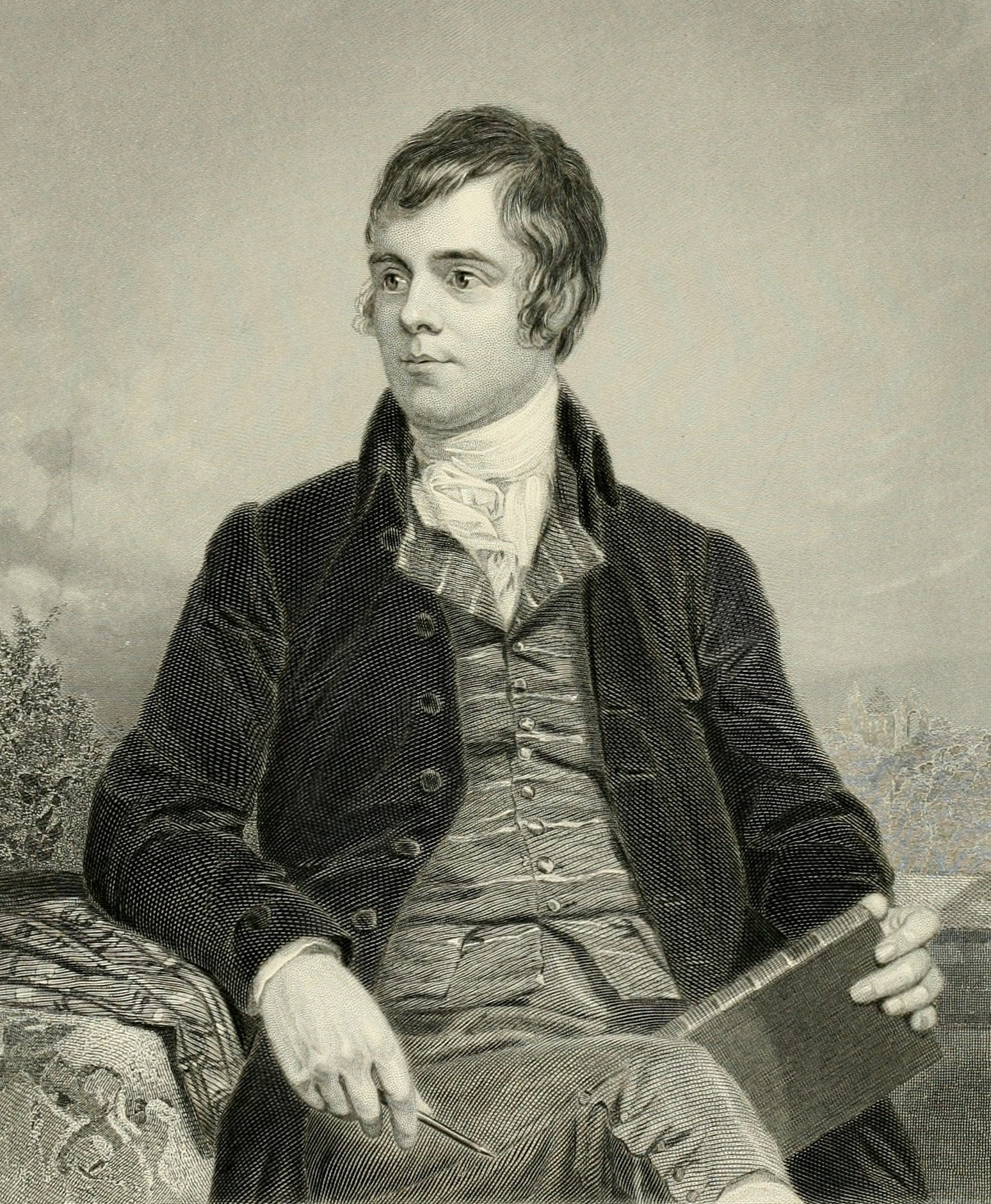
Robert Burns, Scotland's national poet

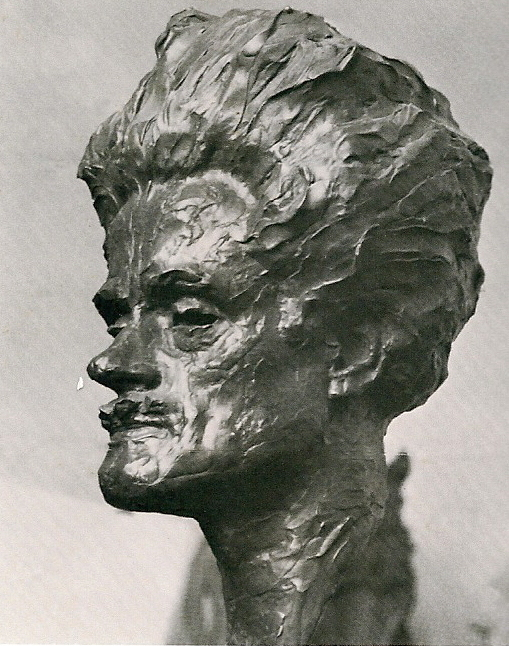
Bust of Hugh MacDiarmid, leading figure in Scottish modernism

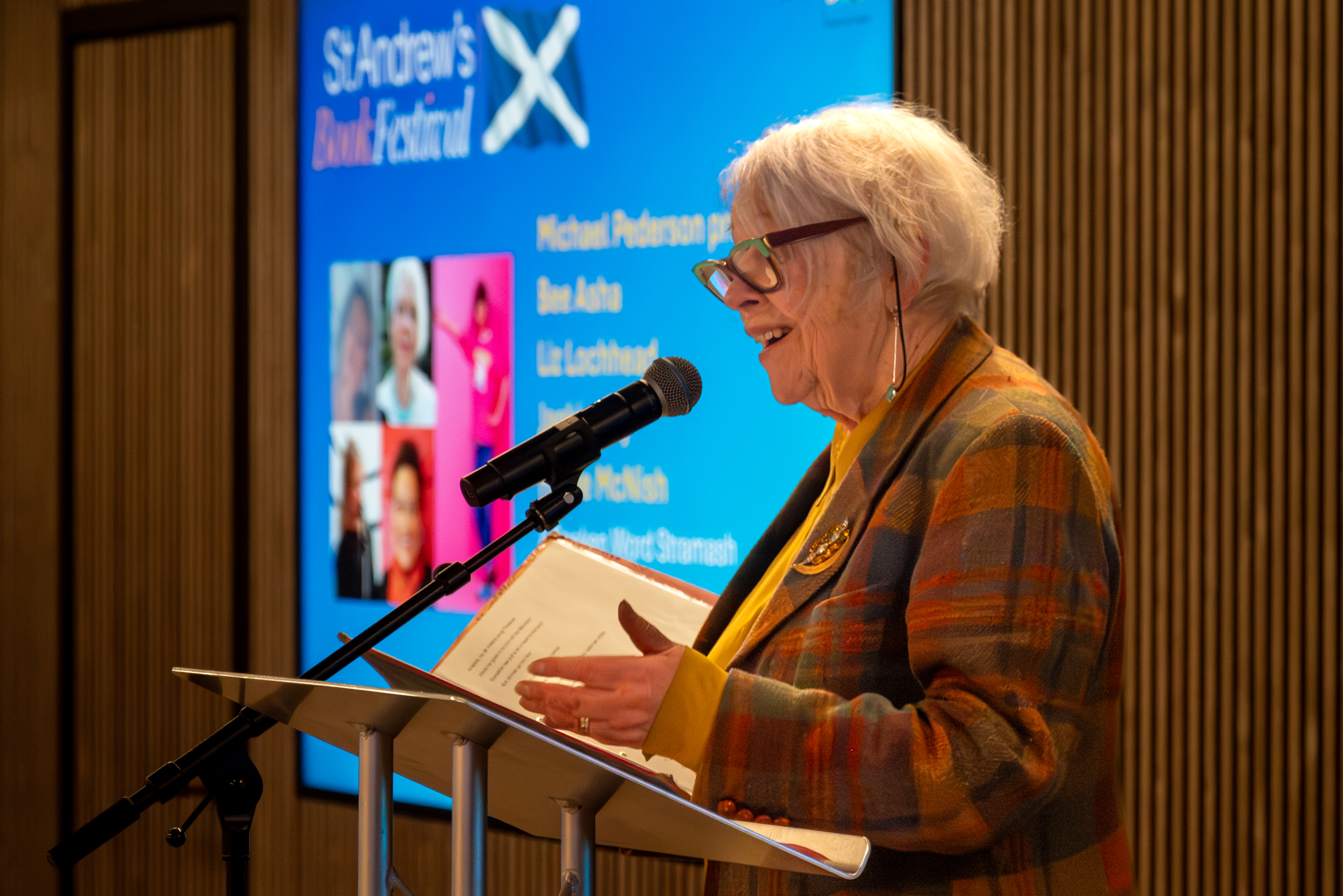
Liz Lochhead, the first female Makar

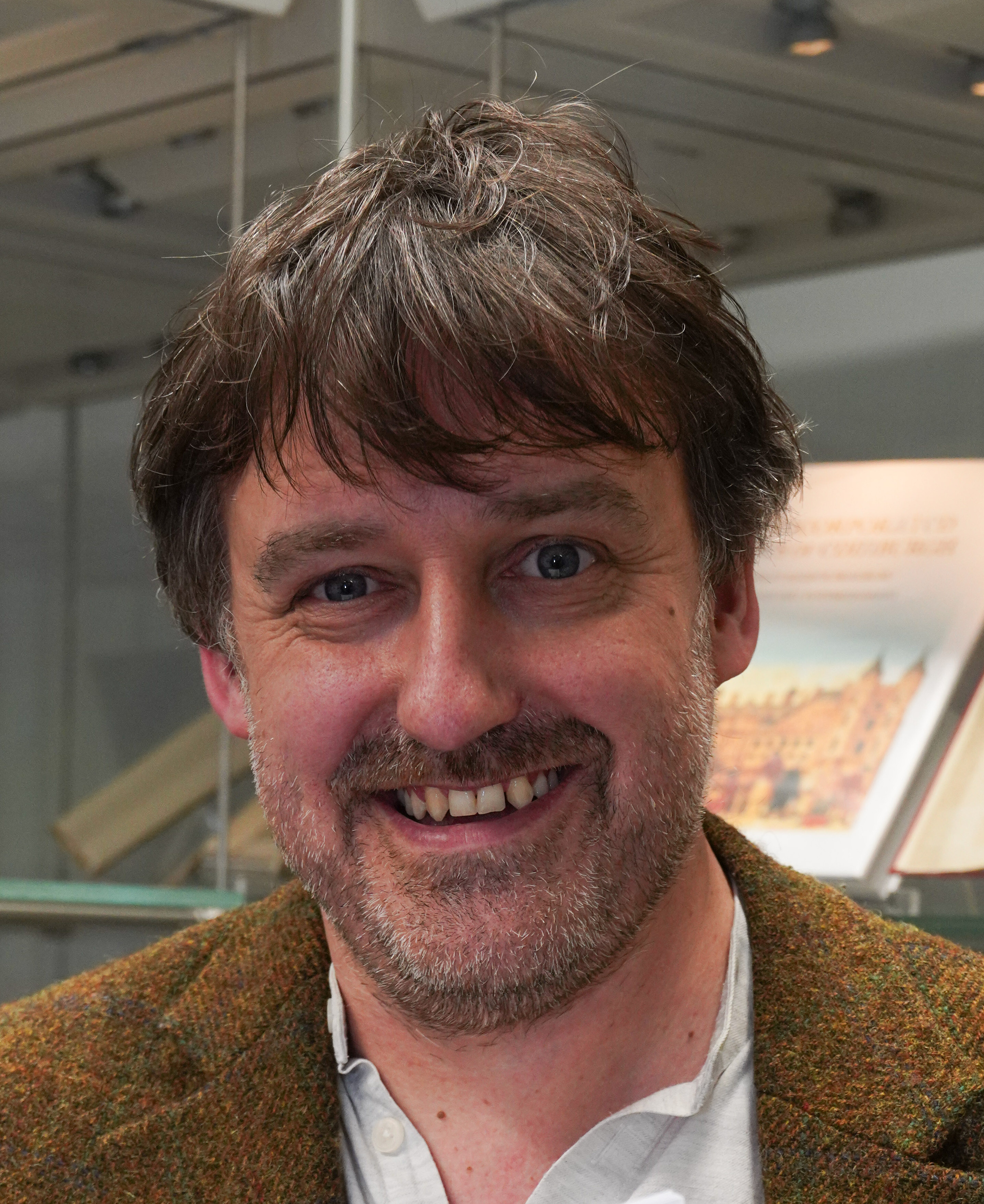
Pàdraig MacAoidh, Scotland's current Makar

== A ==
- Alexander Anderson (poet) (1845–1909)
- Freddie Anderson (writer) (1922–2001)
- James Anderson (poet and songwriter) (1835–1922)
- William Anderson (Scottish writer) (1805–1866)
- Alexander Arbuthnot (poet) (1538–1583)
- William Alexander, 1st Earl of Stirling (c. 1567–1640)
- Helen Adam (1909–1993)
- Henry Adamson (1581–1637)
- Hew Ainslie (1792–1878)
- Thomas Aird (1802–1876)
- Robert Allan (poet) (1774–1841)
- Sandra Alland (born 1973)
- Robert Alves (1745–1794)
- Marion Angus (1865–1946)
- Aneirin (fl. c. 6th century)
- J. K. Annand (1908–1993)
- John Armstrong (poet) (1709–1779)
- John Armstrong (journalist/poet) (1771–1797)
- Donna Ashworth (living)
- Thomas Atkinson (poet) (1801–1833)
- William Auld (1924–2006)
- William Aytoun (1813–1865)
- Robert Aytoun (1570–1638)

== B ==
- Joanna Baillie (1762–1851)
- Alexander Bald (1783–1859)
- Alexander Balfour (novelist) (1767–1829)
- James Ballantine (1806–1877)
- George Bannatyne (1545–1608)
- Anne Bannerman (1765–1829)
- John Barbour (poet) (1316–1395)
- John Barclay (poet) (1582–1621)
- Thomas de Barry (fl. 1560)
- Matthias Barr (1831–1911)
- Meg Bateman (born 1959)
- George Beattie (poet) (1786–1823)
- James Beattie (poet) (1735–1803)
- William Beattie (physician) (1793–1875)
- John Joy Bell (1871–1934)
- John Bellenden (fl. 1533–1587)
- Sheena Blackhall (born 1947)
- David MacLeod Black (born 1941)
- John Stuart Blackie (1809–1895)
- Thomas Blacklock (1721–1791)
- Robert Blair (poet) (1699–1746)
- Alan Bold (1943–1998)
- Deric Bolton (1908–1993)
- Mark Alexander Boyd (1562–1601)
- Frederick Victor Branford (1892–1941)
- George Mackay Brown (1921–1996)
- Horatio Brown (1854–1926)
- Archibald Bruce (1774–1816)
- Michael Bruce (poet) (1746–1767)
- Giolla Críost Brúilingeach (fl. 1440)
- John Buchan (1875–1940)
- Dugald Buchanan (1716–1768)
- George Buchanan (1506–1582)
- Robert Williams Buchanan (1841–1901)
- Rhoda Bulter (1929–1994)
- Haldane Burgess (1862–1927)
- Robert Burns (1759–1796)
- James Drummond Burns (1823–1864)
- John Burnside (1955–2024)
- John Burrell (poet) (fl. 1590)
- Ron Butlin (born 1949)
- Lord Byron (1788–1824)

== C ==
- John M. Caie (1878–1949)
- Maoilios Caimbeul (born 1944)
- Janet Caird (1913–1992)
- Angus Calder (1942–2008)
- Norman Cameron (poet) (1905–1953)
- A. Y. Campbell (1885–1958)
- Angus Peter Campbell (born 1954)
- Donald Campbell (poet) (1940–2019)
- Dorothea Primrose Campbell (1793–1863)
- Niall Campbell (poet) (born 1984)
- Thomas Campbell (poet) (1777–1844)
- Sìleas na Ceapaich (fl. 1660–1729)
- Thomas Clark (writer) (born 1980)
- William Cleland (poet) (c. 1661–1689)
- W. D. Cocker (1882–1970)
- Stewart Conn (born 1936)
- Grace Corbett (c. 1765–1843)
- Joe Corrie (1894–1968)
- Thomas Craig (jurist) (1538–1608)
- Robert Crawford (Scottish poet) (born 1959)
- Archibald Crawfurd (1785–1843)
- Duncan MacGregor Crerar (1836–1916)
- Ian Crockatt (born 1949)
- Helen Cruickshank (1886–1975)
- Allan Cunningham (author) (1784–1842)
- Walterina Cunningham (c. 1765–1837)
- Robert Cunninghame Graham of Gartmore (1735–1797)
- James Cuthbertson (1851–1910)
- Ivor Cutler (1923–2006)

== D ==
- David Daiches (1912–2005)
- Hew Dalrymple (advocate) (1727–1774)
- Harriet Miller Davidson (1839–1883)
- John Davidson (poet) (1857–1909)
- Robert Davidson (poet) (1778–1855)
- Thomas Davidson (poet) (1838–1870)
- Edward Davison (poet) (1898–1970)
- Christine De Luca (born 1947)
- Imtiaz Dharker (born 1954)
- Des Dillon (writer) (born 1960)
- David Doig (1719–1800)
- Rob Donn (1714–1778)
- Gavin Douglas (c. 1474–1522)
- George Brisbane Scott Douglas (1856–1935)
- William Drummond of Hawthornden (1585–1649)
- William Dudgeon (poet) (c. 1753–1813)
- William Dunbar (fl. 1459–1530)
- Hal Duncan (born 1971)
- Douglas Dunn (1942–2026)

== E ==
- George Eglisham (fl. 1612–1642)
- Jean Elliot (1727–1805)
- Henry Erskine (lawyer) (1746–1817)

== F ==
- Jenni Fagan (born 1977)
- William Falconer (poet) (1732–1770)
- Henry Brougham Farnie (1836–1889)
- Alison Fell (born 1944)
- Robert Fergusson (1750–1774)
- John Ferriar (1761–1815)
- Ian Hamilton Finlay (1925–2006)
- John Finlay (poet) (1782–1810)
- Matthew Fitt (born 1968)
- James Fordyce (1720–1796)
- Veronica Forrest-Thomson (1947–1975)
- William Forsyth (writer) (1818–1879)
- William Fowler (makar) (c. 1560–1612)
- George Sutherland Fraser (1915–1980)
- Olive Fraser (1909–1977)
- Robin Fulton (born 1937)

== G ==
- Richard Gall (1776–1801)
- Alexander Garden (poet) (c. 1585–c. 1642)
- Robert Garioch (1909–1981)
- Flora Garry (1900–2000)
- Alexander Geddes (1737–1802)
- Magi Gibson (born 1953)
- George Gilfillan (1813–1878)
- Robert Gilfillan (1798–1850)
- Robert Pearse Gillies (1789–1858)
- Duncan Glen (1933–2008)
- William Glen (poet) (1789–1826)
- John Glenday (born 1952)
- Jean Glover (1758–1801)
- Robert Gordon of Straloch (1580–1661)
- Rody Gorman (born 1960)
- James Graeme (poet) (1749–1772)
- Lollie Graham (1924–2008)
- W. S. Graham (1918–1986)
- James Grahame (1765–1811)
- James Grainger (1721–1766)
- David Grant (poet) (1823–1886)
- Joseph Grant (poet) (1805–1835)
- Alasdair Gray (1934–2019)
- Alexander Gray (poet) (1882–1968)
- Christian Gray (poet) (1772–c. 1830)
- David Gray (poet) (1838–1861)
- James Gray (poet) (c. 1770–1830)
- Andrew Greig (born 1951)
- John Grieve (poet) (1781–1836)

== H ==
- Kris Haddow (born 1981)
- Jen Hadfield (born 1978)
- George Halket (fl. 1714–1756)
- Janet Hamilton (1795–1873)
- Patrick Hamilton (poet) (c. 1575–1658)
- William Hamilton (British Army officer) (1891–1917)
- William Hamilton (comic poet) (c. 1665–1751)
- William Hamilton (Jacobite poet) (1704–1754)
- Patrick Hannay (died c. 1630)
- Blind Harry (c. 1440–1492)
- Susanna Hawkins (1787–1868)
- George Campbell Hay (1915–1984)
- Gilbert Hay (poet) (c. 1403–1456)
- Hamish Henderson (1919–2002)
- J. F. Hendry (1912–1986)
- Robert Henryson (c. 1460–1500)
- Thomas Nicoll Hepburn (1861–1930)
- W. N. Herbert (born 1961)
- William Hershaw (born 1957)
- William Maxwell Hetherington (1803–1865)
- Robert Hetrick (c. 1769–1849)
- James Hogg (1770–1835)
- Richard Holland (died 1483)
- John Home (1722–1808)
- Tom Hubbard (born 1950)
- Huchoun (fl. 14th century)
- Alexander Hume (1588–1609)
- David Hume of Godscroft (1558–1629)
- Patrick Hume of Polwarth (c. 1550–1609)
- James Hyslop (poet) (1798–1827)

== I ==
- John Imlah (1799–1846)
- Mick Imlah (1956–2009)
- Aithbhreac Inghean Coirceadal (fl. 1470)

== J ==
- A. B. Jackson (poet) (born 1965)
- Alan Jackson (poet) (born 1938)
- Violet Jacob (1863–1946)
- James I of Scotland (1394–1437)
- Robert William Jameson (1805–1868)
- Kathleen Jamie (born 1962)
- Robert Alan Jamieson (born 1958)
- Arthur Johnston (poet) (1579–1641)
- John Johnston (poet) (c. 1570–1611)

== K ==
- Walter Kennedy (poet) (c. 1455–c. 1508)
- John Ker (1673–1726)
- Jackie Kay (born 1961)
- William Knox (Scottish poet) (1789–1825)
- Rögnvald Kali Kolsson (c. 1100–1158)
- Norman Kreitman (1927–2012)
- Frank Kuppner (born 1951)

== L ==
- R. D. Laing (1927–1989)
- Andrew Lang (1844–1912)
- John Lapraik (1727–1807)
- William Lauder (poet) (c. 1520–1573)
- T. S. Law (1916–1997)
- Joseph Lee (poet) (1876–1949)
- Charlotte Lennox (1729–1804)
- Tom Leonard (poet) (1944–2018)
- Eddie Linden (1935–2023)
- Jenny Lindsay (born 1982)
- Maurice Lindsay (broadcaster) (1918–2009)
- Janet Little (1759–1813)
- Pippa Little (living)
- Liz Lochhead (born 1947)
- John Logan (minister) (1748–1788)
- Iain Lom (c. 1624–c. 1710)
- John Longmuir (poet) (1803–1883)
- Roddy Lumsden (1966–2020)
- David Lyndsay (c. 1486–c. 1555)
- Agnes Lyon (1762–1840)
- John Lyon (1803–1889)

== M ==
- Pàdraig MacAoidh (born 1979)
- George MacBeth (1932–1992)
- Norman MacCaig (1910–1996)
- Hugh MacDiarmid (1892–1978)
- Andrew Macdonald (poet) (1757–1790)
- Donald MacDonald (poet) (1887–1967)
- George MacDonald (1824–1905)
- James Macfarlan (1832–1862)
- Murdo Macfarlane (1901–1982)
- James Pittendrigh Macgillivray (1856–1938)
- Alasdair Alpin MacGregor (1899–1970)
- Stuart MacGregor (writer) (1935–1973)
- Artúr Dall Mac Gurcaigh (fl. 15th century)
- Duncan Ban MacIntyre (1724–1812)
- James McIntyre (poet) (1828–1906)
- John William Mackail (1859–1945)
- Barbara Mackay (c. 1615–c. 1690)
- Charles Mackay (author) (1814–1889)
- Lachlan Mackinnon (born 1956)
- Ewart Alan Mackintosh (1893–1917)
- Ewen MacLachlan (1775–1822)
- Alasdair Maclean (1926–1994)
- Sorley MacLean (1911–1996)
- Anne MacLeod (born 1951)
- Beccán mac Luigdech (fl. 7th century)
- Alasdair mac Mhaighstir Alasdair (c. 1698–1770)
- Aonghas MacNeacail (1942–2022)
- Kevin MacNeil (born 1972)
- Hector Macneill (1746–1818)
- Robert Macnish (1802–1837)
- James Macpherson (1736–1796)
- Donnchadh MacRath (died c. 1700)
- Wes Magee (1939–2021)
- Richard Maitland (1496–1586)
- Willy Maley (born 1960)
- David Mallet (writer) (c. 1705–1765)
- Peter Manson (born 1969)
- Theodore Martin (1816–1909)
- James Maxwell (poet) (1720–1800)
- John Mayne (1759–1836)
- Isabella Fyvie Mayo (1843–1914)
- Brian McCabe (author) (born 1951)
- Marion McCready (born 1977)
- Matthew McDiarmid (1914–1996)
- Elvis McGonagall (born 1960)
- William McGonagall (1825–1902)
- Robert Murray M'Cheyne (1813–1843)
- William McIlvanney (1936–2015)
- Alastair McIntosh (born 1955)
- Alexander McLachlan (poet) (1818–1896)
- Robert McLellan (1907–1985)
- Hugh McMillan (poet) (born 1955)
- Gordon Meade (born 1957)
- Elizabeth Melville (c. 1578–c. 1640)
- James Melville (Scottish minister) (1556–1614)
- William Mercer (poet) (c. 1605–c. 1675)
- William Meston (c. 1688–1745)
- Iseabail Ní Mheic Cailéin (fl. 1500)
- William Julius Mickle (1734–1788)
- William Miller (poet) (1810–1872)
- Christian Milne (1773–1816)
- Naomi Mitchison (1897–1999)
- David Macbeth Moir (1798–1851)
- Alexander Montgomerie (c. 1550–1598)
- James Graham, 1st Marquess of Montrose (1612–1650)
- Edwin Morgan (1920–2010)
- J. O. Morgan (born 1978)
- David R. Morrison (author) (1941–2012)
- William Motherwell (1797–1835)
- Edwin Muir (1887–1959)
- John Munro (poet) (1889–1918)
- Neil Munro (writer) (1863–1930)
- William Murdoch (poet) (1823–1887)
- Charles Murray (poet) (1864–1941)
- Robert Fuller Murray (1863–1893)

== N ==
- Carolina Nairne (1766–1845)
- Charles Neaves (1800–1876)
- William Neill (poet) (1922–2010)
- William Nicholson (poet) (1782–1849)
- Robert Nicoll (1814–1837)

== O ==
- Niall O'Gallagher (born 1981)
- William Henry Ogilvie (1869–1963)
- Eliza Anne Ogilvy (1822–1912)
- Meta Orred (c. 1845–1925)
- George Outram (1805–1856)

== P ==
- Janet Paisley (1948–2018)
- Andrew Park (poet) (1807–1863)
- Alasdair Paterson (living)
- Don Paterson (born 1963)
- Walter Perrie (born 1849)
- Robert Pollok (poet) (1798–1827)
- Katrina Porteous (born 1960)
- Richard Price (poet) (born 1966)
- Alison Prince (1932–2019)
- Thomas Pringle (1789–1834)
- David Purves (1924–2015)

== R ==
- Seán Rafferty (1909–1993)
- Tessa Ransford (1938–2015)
- Alastair Reid (poet) (1926–2014)
- Robert Rendall (1898–1967)
- Alan Riach (born 1957)
- Henry Scott Riddell (1798–1870)
- Gary Robertson (author) (born 1967)
- James Robertson (novelist) (born 1958)
- James Logie Robertson (1846–1922)
- Robin Robertson (born 1955)
- John Rolland (fl. 1560)
- David Rorie (1867–1946)
- Uilleam Ros (1762–c.1790)
- Dilys Rose (born 1954)
- Alexander Ross (1699–1784)
- Thomas the Rhymer (fl. c. 1220–1298)

== S ==
- Alexander Scott (16th-century poet) (c. 1520–c. 1582)
- Alexander Scott (20th-century poet) (1920–1989)
- Tom Scott (poet) (1918–1995)
- Walter Scott (1771–1832)
- Sir William Scott of Thirlestane (c. 1670–1725)
- William Bell Scott (1811–1890)
- Thomas Seget (1569–1627)
- J. B. Selkirk (1832–1904)
- James Sempill (1566–1626)
- Robert Sempill the elder (c. 1530–1595)
- Robert Sempill the younger (c. 1595–1663)
- John Campbell Shairp (1819–1885)
- William Sharp (writer) (1855–1905)
- Nan Shepherd (1893–1981)
- David Sillar (1760–1830)
- Burns Singer (1928–1964)
- Felicia Skene (1821–1899)
- John Skinner (poet) (1721–1807)
- William Henry Oliphant Smeaton (1856–1914)
- Alexander Smith (poet) (c. 1829–1867)
- Iain Crichton Smith (1928–1998)
- John Gibson Smith (1815–1891)
- Morelle Smith (living)
- Sydney Goodsir Smith (1915–1975)
- Walter Chalmers Smith (1824–1908)
- Charles Sorley (1895–1915)
- William Soutar (1898–1943)
- Muriel Spark (1918–2006)
- Alan Spence (born 1947)
- Charles Spence (bard) (1779–1869)
- Lewis Spence (1874–1955)
- Alicia Ann Spottiswoode (1810–1900)
- John Sterling (author) (1806–1844)
- Gerda Stevenson (born 1956)
- Robert Louis Stevenson (1850–1894)
- John Stewart of Baldynneis (c. 1545–c. 1605)
- John Alexander Stewart (philosopher) (1846–1933)
- John Roy Stewart (1700–1752)
- William Stewart (makar) (c. 1476–c. 1548)
- William Alexander, 1st Earl of Stirling (1567–1640)
- Thomas Tod Stoddart (1810–1880)
- John Struthers (poet) (1776–1853)
- Maud Sulter (1960–2008)

== T ==
- Alexander Tait (poet) (1720–c. 1800)
- Margaret Tait (1918–1999)
- Robert Tannahill (1774–1810)
- Rachel Annand Taylor (1876–1960)
- William Tennant (poet) (1784–1848)
- William Thom (poet) (1788–1848)
- Derick Thomson (1921–2012)
- James Thomson
- James Thomson (poet, born 1700) (1700–1748)
- James Thomson (poet, born 1834) (1834–1882)
- James Thomson (weaver poet) (1763–1832)
- Ruthven Todd (1914–1978)
- Gael Turnbull (1928–2004)

== U ==
- Joan Ure (1918–1978)
- Thomas Urquhart (1611–1660)

== V ==
- Vagaland (1909–1973)
- George Valentine (poet) (1877–1946)
- John Veitch (poet) (1829–1894)
- Florentius Volusenus (c. 1504–1546)

== W ==
- Roderick Watson (born 1943)
- Lauchlan Watt (1867–1957)
- James Wedderburn (poet) (c. 1495–1553)
- John Wellwood (1853–1919)
- Kenneth White (1936–2023)
- Brian Whittingham (1950–2022)
- Christopher Whyte (born 1952)
- George Whyte-Melville (1821–1878)
- William Wilkie (1721–1772)
- Colin Will (born 1942)
- Kevin Williamson (born 1961)
- John Mackay Wilson (1804–1835)
- Rab Wilson (born 1960)
- William Wilson (poet) (1801–1860)
- David Wingate (poet) (1828–1892)
- John Wright (poet) (1805–1843)
- William Wright (poet) (fl. 1782)

== Y ==
- Douglas Young (classicist) (1913–1973)
- John Younger (writer) (1785–1860)

== See also ==
- List of Scottish writers
- List of Scottish dramatists
- List of Irish poets
