= Morelle =

Morelle is a surname and a given name. Notable people with the name include:

Given name:

- Morelle McCane, American boxer
- Charles Morelle Bruce (1853–1938), American businessman and politician
- Morelle Smith, Scottish author of poetry, essays, fiction, and travel articles

Surname:

- Anne Lévy-Morelle (born 1961), Belgian film director and writer
- Denise Morelle (1926–1984), Quebec actress murdered in 1984
- Joseph Morelle (born 1957), American politician
- Rebecca Morelle (born 1978), British science journalist, global science correspondent for BBC News

== See also ==
- Doctor Morelle, 1949 British mystery film directed by Godfrey Grayson
- Greens Morelle (disambiguation)
- Merille
- Mireille
- Morille
