= David Grant =

David or Dave Grant may refer to:

== Sportspeople ==
- David Grant (footballer, born 1947), English footballer
- David Grant (rugby league) (1956–1994), Australian rugby league footballer
- David Grant (footballer, born 1960), English footballer
- David Grant (American football) (born 1965), American football player
- David Grant (Australian rules footballer) (born 1966)
- David Grant (cricketer) (born 1997), Australian cricketer

== Others ==
- David Grant (poet) (1823–1886), Scottish poet
- David Norvell Walker Grant (1891–1964), U.S. Army general and doctor
- David Grant (producer) (1939–1991), British photographer and producer of sexploitation films
- David Grant (academic) (born 1947), vice chancellor of Cardiff University in Wales
- David Marshall Grant (born 1955), American actor and playwright
- David Grant (singer) (born 1956), British singer and celebrity vocal coach
- Dave Grant (1958–2010), Australian comedian
