= Gospatric (sheriff of Roxburgh) =

Gospatric is the first known sheriff of Roxburgh, a burgh in Teviotdale. His father is thought to have been Uhtred son of Ulfkill.

A Cospatricio vicecomite ("Gospatric the Sheriff") is mentioned in the foundation charter of Selkirk Abbey. The charter was issued by Earl David (later King David I) and probably dates to between either 1120 and 1121, or 1123 and 1124, though it could be as early as 1114.

A Gospatricus Vicecomes ("Gospatric the Sheriff") witnessed a grant by David, now king of Scotland, to Durham Cathedral Priory, sometime between April 1126 and March 1127.

He witnessed a grant of land in Roxburgh to the church of St John of the castle of Roxburgh sometime between 1124 and 1133. Although Sir Archibald Campbell Lawrie was uncertain what sheriffdom Gospatric held, G. W. S. Barrow and Norman Reid believed it to be Roxburghshire because of this charter.

Gospatric came to know Aelred of Rievaulx while he (Aelred) was serving as steward in the household of King David I in Roxburgh.

During the reign of David I, the barony of Crailing belonged to Gospatric, who conferred its churches to the abbot of Jedburgh. The ancient cross of the barony still stands on the A698 across from Lothian Hall in Crailing.

== See also ==
- Thor of Tranent
- Máel Bethad of Liberton
- Máel Brigte of Perth
