= Alexander Hewat =

American historian

Dr Alexander Hewat
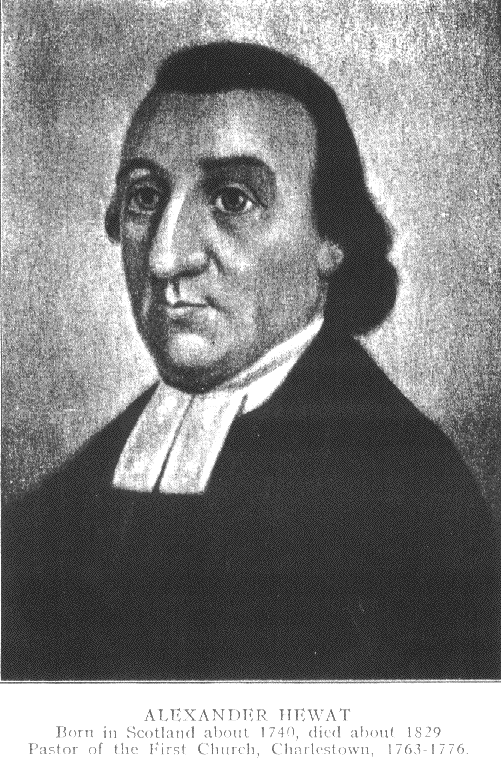
- Born: 1739; Roxburgh, Scotland
- Died: 3 March 1824 (aged 84–85); 8 Great Quebec Street, London
- Occupations: Minister of the First Presbyterian Church in Charleston, SC
- Known for: First Historian of South Carolina & Georgia

Dr. Alexander Hewatt (1739–1824); b. Roxburgh, Scotland) was the first historian of South Carolina and Georgia, best known for his two volume work "An Historical Account of the Rise and Progress of the Colonies of South Carolina and Georgia". He remained loyal to the King during the American Revolution, and as a result his property was seized and he was expelled in 1777.

== Life and work ==
Hewat(t) was a Presbyterian minister who officiated in Charleston, South Carolina from 1763 to 1777. After the publication of his History in 1779, he was awarded an honorary DD doctorate degree by Edinburgh University. His character may be illustrated by one of his Sermons cited by Smollett.

Gold is the idol of every traitor, and he that proves faithful to his king and country for a great reward only, will betray them both for a greater. What was the method Constantius Chlorus took to try the souls of his public servants, both civil and military? Being friendly disposed towards the Christian religion, and sensible how hard it was to know the human heart, we are told, that he assembled his officers and judges, and proposed to them this condition, either to sacrifice to demons, or leave the court and their places to others, giving each liberty of choice. By this device he divided his servants into two parties, into men of principle, and men of the world. (p. 347)

Hewat believed that Religion was important for the cohesion of society, where every man should do his duty according to the station in life that Providence had allocated to him. In a 1794 sermon on The Duty of Man in Perilous Times cited by The English Review he warned: "Let the superior ranks beware how they introduce into society an irreverence for God, and a distaste for religion; for they cannot do so but at their peril." The lower ranks are taught their duty, and warned against: the dangers of civil convulsion, with equal propriety.

Hewat's History of South Carolina and Georgia includes observations of the peoples of the area, so although its account of early history may be inaccurate to a degree and his historical interpretation of the events of the times no longer in fashion, his observation of facts continues to be cited, especially his accounts of slaves and Native Americans. Hewat may have been only a "gentleman historian" but he had the advantage of first-hand observation, with the ability, time, and local contacts required for a remarkably dispassionate account of pre-revolutionary Carolina. Hewat's history, one author said, "is the basis — in fact the substance — of Ramsay's history, which quotes him copiously (without acknowledgement) and follows him blindly." A less strident assessment is that Ramsay "shows a disposition to follow slavishly in the footsteps of Hewat."

Contemporaneous resident of Charleston, but on the Revolutionary side, Congressman David Ramsay acknowledged his extensive use of Hewat's History, writing in his 1808 Preface: "Dr. Hewat's historical account of the rise and progress of the colonies of South Carolina and Georgia, was read with much more advantage — on it greater reliance was placed — and of it more use has been made, than of all the histories which had preceded. To him every Carolinian ought to be obliged for preserving many useful facts which otherwise would before this day have been forgotten. His valuable work was written shortly before the American Revolution, when tradition went further back and was more recent than at present."

Hewatt Square, in Charleston, South Carolina, was named for him.

Hewat's History is still a respected account of Colonial American history. Incidentally, the "Hewatt" spelling was apparently introduced after his book was published anonymously; manuscript letters (below) show that he himself spelled his name "Hewat".

== Family ==
Hewat came from a long line of Calvinist farmers, notaries and churchmen. The earliest record of the name appears to be a William Hewat (born about 1366); the UK National Archives show he bore witness to a grant of land and tenement at Nustede (Newstead) in 1387. Peter Hewat (born before 1482) was a Notary in Roxburgh Scotland; the National Archives of Scotland show he was a witness to an assignment of land to the church on 16 September 1503. James Hewat, was a Dominican Order friar in Dundee in the 1520s, and one of the earliest teachers of Calvin's doctrine in Scotland. In the conflicts between Catholic, Protestant and then Anglican and Puritan religions, Hewats often found themselves on the wrong side. In 1619 (the year before Mayflower) Peter Hewat a church leader, notary and member of the Parliament of Scotland, was exiled to Crossraguel Abbey (which had been given to him in 1612 by the king) after James VI of Scotland had become head of the official Anglican church as James I of England. By the 18th century Hewats were farming around Roxburgh when Alexander's grandfather James was expelled from his kirk for taking over other people's land. However, Alexander's father Richard (1707–1776) became an elder of the church and is described on his tombstone, still standing in Roxburgh churchyard, as "an honest and industrious man and a sincere and devout Christian".

== Alexander Hewat's arrival in Charleston and his History of the Colony ==
Hewat was a young man of about twenty-four when he arrived in Charleston in 1763 as minister of the Scots (First Presbyterian) Church there. He had received his early education at Kelso Grammar School in Scotland and had attended the University of Edinburgh. Shortly after his arrival in Charleston he was elected to the St. Andrew's Club, an organisation of native-born Scotsmen which included some of the colony's leading men, and so had the chance to secure authentic evidence and first-hand experience for his historical narrative. His association with royal officials gave him access to official documents which he used in his history.

Hewat's first volume attempts to outline the earliest settlement of North America, and the reasons for the influx of British, French and other European migrants in the early 17th century due to religious conflict at home. He wrote: "Amidst cold, hunger, toil, disease, and distress of every kind, they comforted themselves with the thoughts of being removed far out of the reach of tyrants, and triumphed in their deliverance from an idolatrous and wicked nation."

Hewat describes in much detail the conditions and customs of American Indians, with whom he shows sympathy despite their threat to European immigrants. "When Julius Caesar carried the Roman arms into Britain, and Germanicus over-ran the forests of Germany, did they not find the silvestres of those countries little, if at all, more civilized than the brown natives of America?" And even some humour ... "In case of adultery among Indians, the injured husband considers himself as under an obligation to revenge the crime, and he attempts to cut off the ears of the adulterer... This is more severe than the law of Ethelbert, which admitted of a fine from the adulterer, and obliged him to purchase another wife for the injured husband."

He describes the settlement of Carolina by aristocratic British Proprietors, the setting up of plantations, wars with the Indians, the Spanish and Pirates, and the hardships of the climate. "New settlers in all countries and climates are subject to many hardships, especially such as are in low and indigent circumstances; but those of the first settlers of Carolina must have equalled, if not surpassed, every thing of the kind to which men in any age have been exposed." He describes the ravages of smallpox, yellow fever and other diseases on both the native and immigrant population.

Hewat describes the introduction of African slaves, and maintains that "Hawkins had no idea of perpetual slavery, but expected they would be treated as free servants, after they had by their labours brought their masters an equivalent for the expense of their purchase... Hence arose that horrid and inhuman practice of dragging Africans into slavery; which has since been so pursued, in defiance of every principle of justice and religion... Nature has given the people of the one continent no superiority over those of the other; the advantages of Europeans were the effects only of art and improvement."

Hewat saw Africans as more suited to the SC climate, and essential to the Southern Economy, but imagined an indentured servant system similar to that which existed for white immigrants, and supposed that the conditions of slavery would incite them to revolt, as indeed they did at Stono in September 1739. "At this time there were above forty thousand negroes in the province, a fierce, hardy and strong race, whose constitutions were adapted to the warm climate, whose nerves were braced with constant labour, and who could scarcely be supposed to be contented with that oppressive yoke under which they groaned."

Hewat's own brother Andrew, used Black labour on his plantation, and after the Revolution at least one followed him into exile, first to Nova Scotia, and then back to Roxburgh. Indeed, many Black Loyalists fought against the revolution, and left with White Loyalists as a result. The economic requirement for Black labour in the South, and the growing opposition to slavery in Britain, may have been one of the roots of the revolution in the South, just as it was later in the civil war. In his history, Hewat points to errors made by the British Administration, and is careful not to criticise unduly the revolutionaries, setting out their complaints in some detail about what they saw as unfair taxation, or indeed any taxation at all by a parliament they claimed could not, at that distance, represent them. He did however passionately believe that Britain and America had more to achieve united than separated.

When Hewat, along with other Charleston ministers, was ordered on 3 August 1776 to pray no more for the king, he "changed the form to 'those in Lawful Authority over us' which gave great Offence," but complied with the letter of the order. Given sixty days to leave the colony or suffer imprisonment and perhaps death, Hewat left his congregation and his property and took passage to Nantes; from there, he went to London. Charleston had been recaptured by British forces by the time Hewat received the honorary Doctor of Divinity degree from Edinburgh University on 12 July 1780. He obviously expected to return to his home, for he signed the Laureation Book of the University as a resident of "Charlestown, South Carolina." American animosity against those who had not supported the rebellion relegated loyalists to historical oblivion; nor did the British receive them with generosity or pay them honour for their sacrifice.

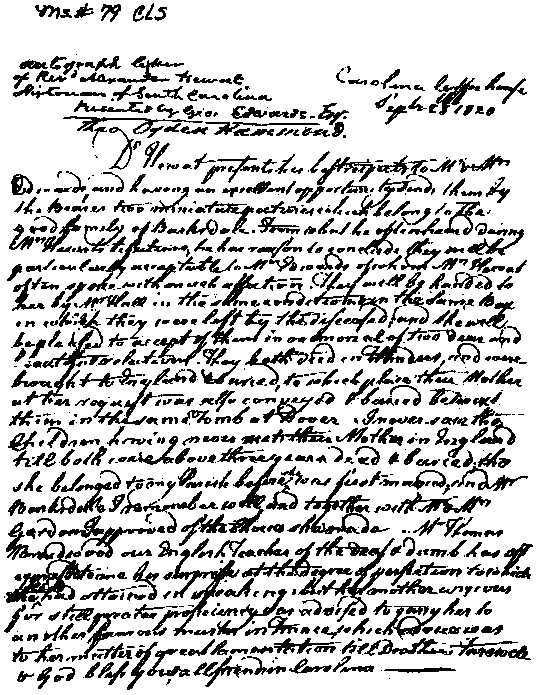
Dr Alexander Hewat's letter To G. Edwards, 28 September 1820. Charleston Library Society MS#79 via Ogden Hammond.

== Manuscript copy of Dr Alexander Hewat's letter of 28 September 1820 ==
On the death of his wife (formerly Mrs Barksdale of Charleston), Hewat wrote to G. Edwards, her relation in Charleston, showing much affection still for South Carolina. This manuscript clearly shows that he spelled his name "Hewat".

George Edwards, Charleston So., Carolina

Carolina Coffee House (London), 28 September 1820

Dr Hewat presents his best respects to Mr & Mrs Edwards, and having an excellent opportunity sends them by the Bearer two miniature pictures which belong to the good family of Barksdale. From what he often heard during Mrs Hewat's lifetime he has reason to conclude they will be particularly acceptable to Mrs Edwards of whom Mrs Hewat often spoke with much affection. They will be handed to her by Mr Hall in the same condition & in the Same Box in which they were left by the Deceased; and She will be pleased to accept of them in memorial of two dear and beautiful relations. They both died in Flanders and were brought to England & buried, to which place their Mother at her request was also conveyed & buried betwixt them in the same Tomb at Dover. I never saw the children, having never met their Mother in England till both were above three years & dead & buried; tho' she belonged to my Parish before she was first married; and Mr Barksdale I remember well, and together with Mr & Mrs Gordon I approved of the Choice she made. Mr Thomas Braidwood our English Teacher of the Deaf & Dumb has oft expressed to me his surprise at the degree of perfection to which the child had attained in speaking; but her mother, anxious for still greater proficiency, was advised to carry her to another famous master in France, which advice was to her matter of great lamentation till Death. Farewell & God bless you & all friends in Carolina.

== Death ==
Alexander Hewat died in Marylebone, London on 3 March 1824 at the age of 85.

He left an estate of 7000 sterling (equivalent to almost £500,000 in 2000), including a small legacy to the Scots church in Charleston, and is buried in St. John's Wood.

== Works ==
- An historical account of the rise and progress of the colonies of South Carolina and Georgia (1779)
- Sermons on various subjects (1803)
