= Thomas Hogarth =

Thomas Hogarth may refer to:

- Thomas Hogarth (politician), politician in the Colony of South Australia
- Thomas Hogarth (rugby union), English rugby union player
- Thomas William Hogarth, Scottish-born Australian veterinarian and writer
