= John Younger (disambiguation) =

John Younger (1851–1874) was an American outlaw.

John Younger may also refer to:

- John Younger (writer) (1785–1860), writer, shoemaker, and poet
- Sir John David Bingham Younger, Lord Lieutenant of Tweeddale
- John Younger (priest), Dean of Salisbury
- John Younger (rower), American rower in the 1985 World Rowing Championships

== See also ==
- John the Younger (disambiguation)
