= George Valentine =

George Valentine may refer to:

- George Valentine (photographer) (1852–1890), Scottish photographer
- George Valentine (footballer) (1899–1980), Australian rules footballer
- George Valentine (poet) (1877–1946), Scottish sheriff and writer

== See also ==
- George Valentine Cox (1786–1875), English author
