= Ednam Church =

Church in Scottish Borders, Scotland

Coordinates: 55.6273°N 2.4193°W

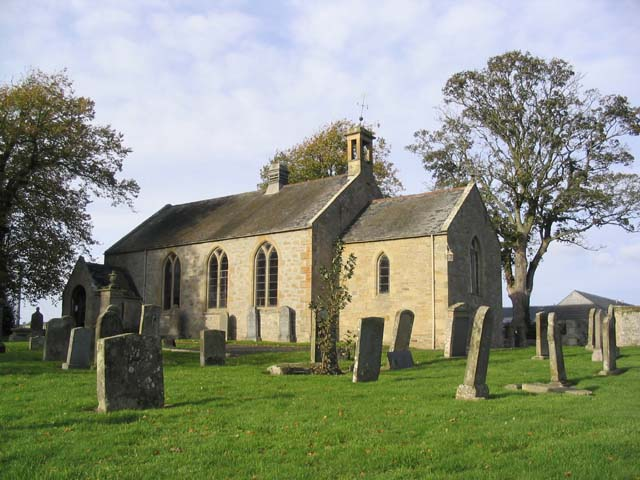
Ednam Parish Church

Ednam Church is a member church (Scots: kirk) of the Church of Scotland and is co–joined with Kelso North Church in Kelso. Ednam is in the old county of Roxburghshire now part of the Scottish Borders Council. Ednam is 3.0 miles (4.8 km) NNE of Kelso on the B6461 road and is at grid reference NT737371

== History ==
Thorlongus or Thor Longus ('Thor the Tall') was the first recorded laird of Ednaham, (from the Old English, 'Settlement on the Eden Water') as Ednam was known. This area is the first known parish in Scotland and was believed to be the start of King Edgar of Scotland's attempt at 'devolved management' to local people.

There has been, at least, three churches at Ednam with the first being founded in 1105 in a charter issued by Thor Longus and dedicated St. Cuthbert. Such was the importance of the church, it became known as 'the mother church of Hedenham' The 12th. century church survived until 1523 when it was destroyed by the English in a cross border raid after which, the church was re–built.

Another early religious establishment at Ednam, St. Leonard's hospital and chapel, was founded in the reign of William I of Scotland (1165–1214) when Ada de Warenne or Northumberland, William's mother, gave the hospital to the master and congregation. In 1392 Robert III of Scotland gave the establishment to his sister and her husband, John Edmondstoune, as a marriage gift. The Edmonstounes would be proprietors of Ednam for the next 250 years. The holy hospital was damaged beyond repair. by the English in 1542 and again in 1544. The field where the hospital was situated is still known as the Spital field.

The church of 1523 was described, in 1680, as being in a ruinous condition and in need of re–building. The new church, built in a slightly different position, was used until 1820 when yet another church was built. Then, in 1902, that church was substantially renovated and added to. The improvements included a chancel, a porch and a vestry for the minister's use and the work was designed and undertaken by the Edinburgh firm of architects, Hardy and Wight.

A copy of Thor's charter of 1105 to the monks of Durham is contained in the church at Ednam.

== Post–Reformation ==
In 1560, at the onset of the Scottish Reformation, the monks left and the mass was banned but it was 39 years before Ednam had a resident minister. The services on the Sabbath and the administration of sacraments were conducted by men known as 'Readers'. In 1599, Rev. Thomas Porteous was ordained as the first Protestant minister at Ednam then in 1617, John Clapperton was appointed but he appeared to favour a more Episcopalian approach and supported the bishops. In 1637, Archbishop Laud and Charles I of Scotland, England and Ireland, introduced the Book of Common Prayer to Scotland which universally denounced by the people of Scotland. When the National Covenant of Scotland was signed at Greyfriar's Kirk in Edinburgh in February 1638, Clapperton was ousted from the post and a Presbyterian minister, John Somerville appointed. Charles I, however, intervened and John Clapperton was reinstated. John Somerville returned the post again in 1639 and preached at Ednam Kirk until 1660 when Charles II of Scotland and England re–introduced the hated prayer book. Robert Young was then appointed the 'vicar of Ednam' where he remained until 1668. Young was soon followed as vicar by Adam Peacock but the congregated still demanded a return to the National Covenant. Adam Peacock was in charge until 1683 when William Speed became the new preacher. In 1688, and the enthronement of William of Orange and his wife, Mary, Princess Royal and Princess of Orange, William Speed wasted no time in departing the post in the knowledge that the Anglican Common Book of Prayer would soon be banned in Scotland's kirks.

== Further list of ministers ==
- 1692 Thomas Thomson
- 1702 William Baxter
- 1723 Thomas Pollock
- 1765 David Dickson
- 1796 Robert Robertson
- 1819 Joseph Thomson
- 1844 William Lamb
- 1878 John Burleigh
- 1925 William Scott
- 1952 John McBride
- 1970 Donald Gaddes
- 1994 Tom McDonald

== Notes of Interest ==
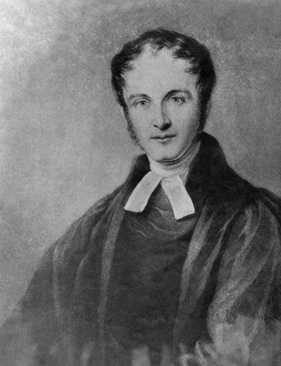
Henry Francis Lyte

The Reverend Henry Francis Lyte. Anglican cleric and hymnwriter was born in Ednam. He wrote the hymns - Abide With Me and Praise My Soul the King of Heaven. Reverend John Burleigh, minister at Ednam wrote the book Ednam and its Indwellers

The poet John G. Smith, of Ednam, published a long-form poem The Old Churchyard, apparently inspired by the inscriptions found there.
