= Kelso High School, Scotland =

Kelso High School

Location
- Angraflat Road; Kelso; Scotland

Information
- Type: Secondary school
- Motto: 'Doe or die'
- Established: 1878
- School district: Scottish Borders
- Head teacher: Jill Lothian
- Enrolment: 613
- Houses: Kale, Bowmont and Teviot
- Colours: Red, black and white
- Website: kelsohighschool.org.uk

Kelso High School is a state-funded comprehensive secondary school in Kelso, Scotland, under the control of the Scottish Borders Council. It is one of nine secondary schools in the Scottish Borders and the only one in Kelso. Pupils come to Kelso High School from the town of Kelso, the villages of Ednam, Eckford, Stichill, Smailholm, Morebattle, Roxburgh, Yetholm and other hamlets in the surrounding area. The current building was opened to students in November 2017.

== History ==
The first documentation of a grammar school in Roxburgh is in 1152. When Roxburgh was abandoned, the school became part of the Kelso Abbey and after the Reformation, it became known as Kelso Grammar School. It was a boys only, fee-paying school run by monks from the Kelso Abbey and was overseen by the Duke of Roxburghe, the Kirk Session and the Heritor. Fees were based on the number and type of courses taken. In 1156, it was mentioned as one of the four principal schools in Scotland. A new school was built in 1670 and was added to in 1780. The Kelso Grammar School was considered in very poor condition and closed its doors in February 1873.

On a site near the Abbey a new Kelso Public School was built and opened in 1879 with 523 pupils. In 1919, following the First World War the school came under control of the Education Authorities and the numbers attending the school exceeded 200. The school remained open until 1939 when the Army took possession. The school was opened in 1939 on Bowmont Street with 693 pupils. It was designed by Edinburgh architects George Reid and John Smith Forbes and today is Category B listed by Historic Scotland as a building of outstanding architectural interest. On 14 November 2017, the current building, built by Morrison Construction, opened on Angraflat Road. In 2021, approval was sought for plans to demolish much of the old premises, retaining the listed facade.

== School badge ==
The Kelso High School badge was adopted when the school was opened and is based on the Coat of Arms of Douglas of Springwood, an estate just across the River Tweed from Kelso. Its design commemorates an event that took place during the Scottish Wars of Independence. Following Scottish King Robert the Bruce's successful fight for Scottish independence from England, he felt the need to join the Holy Land crusades. His desire was not fulfilled due to poor health that led to his death in 1329. Sir James Douglas, a close friend, promised to take his heart to the Holy Land after he would die.

Following Bruce's death, his heart was wrapped in lead and put into a silver casket. Douglas kept his promise and with some followers, headed off to fight in the crusades. They joined the fighting in Seville, Spain where Douglas was killed on 25 March 1330 in the battle of Zebas de Arcales. His body, along with Bruce's heart were brought back to Scotland and Bruce's heart was buried at Melrose Abbey.

Douglas was awarded the coat of arms with the heart and crown symbolizing Bruce's heart following his actions and carrying out his promise. The motto 'Doe or Die' symbolizes 'let us do or die,' Bruce's rallying cry to his troops before the Battle of Bannockburn in 1314.

== Notable alumni of Kelso High School and the former Kelso Grammar School ==
- John Baird - Scottish divine
- James Ballantyne - Publisher
- John Ballantyne - Publisher
- J. H. S. Burleigh - Biblical scholar
- Archibald Campbell Craig - Biblical scholar
- Sir William Fairbairn - Engineer
- Ross Ford - Professional rugby union player
- Christopher Harvie - Politician
- Alexander Hewat - Historian
- Frederick Innes - Former premier of Tasmania
- Thomas William Hogarth - Author and dog judge
- John Moffat - Royal Navy officer
- Christina Montgomery (1870 – 1965) was the founding head of Melbourne Girls' High School.
- Shona Mooney - Scottish musician
- William Henry Ogilvie - Scottish-born Australian Poet
- Oscar Onley - Cyclist.
- Thomas Pringle - Author
- Sir William Purves - International banker
- Bryan Redpath - Former rugby union player
- Paul Salkovskis - English psychologist
- Sir Walter Scott - Author

== Notable staff ==
- James Fairgrieve - Geographer
