= J. H. S. Burleigh =

Scottish minister and biblical scholar

John Henderson Seaforth Burleigh (1894–1985) was a Scottish minister and biblical scholar who served as Moderator of the General Assembly of the Church of Scotland in 1960. He was Honorary President of the Scottish Church History Society. In authorship he is usually referred to as J. H. S. Burleigh.

== Life ==
He was born in the manse at Ednam in the Scottish Borders in 1894 the son of Rev Burleigh. He was educated at Kelso High School and George Watson's College in Edinburgh. He studied classics at the University of Edinburgh graduating in 1915.

In World War I he served in the King's Own Scottish Borderers. Returning to the University of Edinburgh after the war he changed to divinity and graduated a Bachelor of Divinity (BD) in 1920. He then undertook postgraduate studies researching Jan Huss in various European centres: Paris, Strasbourg, Prague and Oxford.

From 1931 to 1964, he was Professor of Ecclesiastical History at the University of Edinburgh, also acting as Dean of the Faculty of Divinity from 1956.

As Moderator he was succeeded in 1961 by Archibald Campbell Craig.

He retired in 1964 and died in Peebles on 22 March 1985.

== Publications ==
- The Church: What Is It? (1937)
- The City of God (1949)
- Augustine: Early Writings (1953)
- A Church History of Scotland (1961)
- St Augustine: Of True Religion (1968)
