= Mollett =

Mollett is a surname. Notable people with the surname include:

- Callum Cockerill-Mollett (born 1999), English-born Irish footballer
- Henry C. Mollett (1938–2024), American politician in Iowa
- Ryan Mollett (born 1978), American finance executive and lacrosse player

== See also ==
- Smollett
