= Charles Neaves, Lord Neaves =

Scottish theologian, jurist and writer (1800–1876)

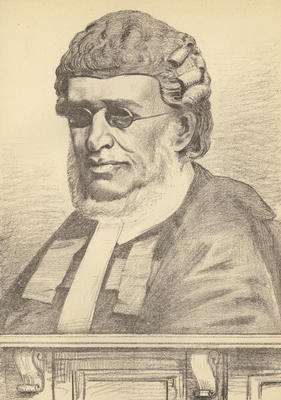
- Lord Neaves as a judge
- Born: October 14, 1800; Edinburgh, Scotland, U.K.
- Died: December 23, 1876 (aged 76)
- Burial place: Warriston Cemetery (Edinburgh)
- Occupations: Advocate, judge, theologian and writer

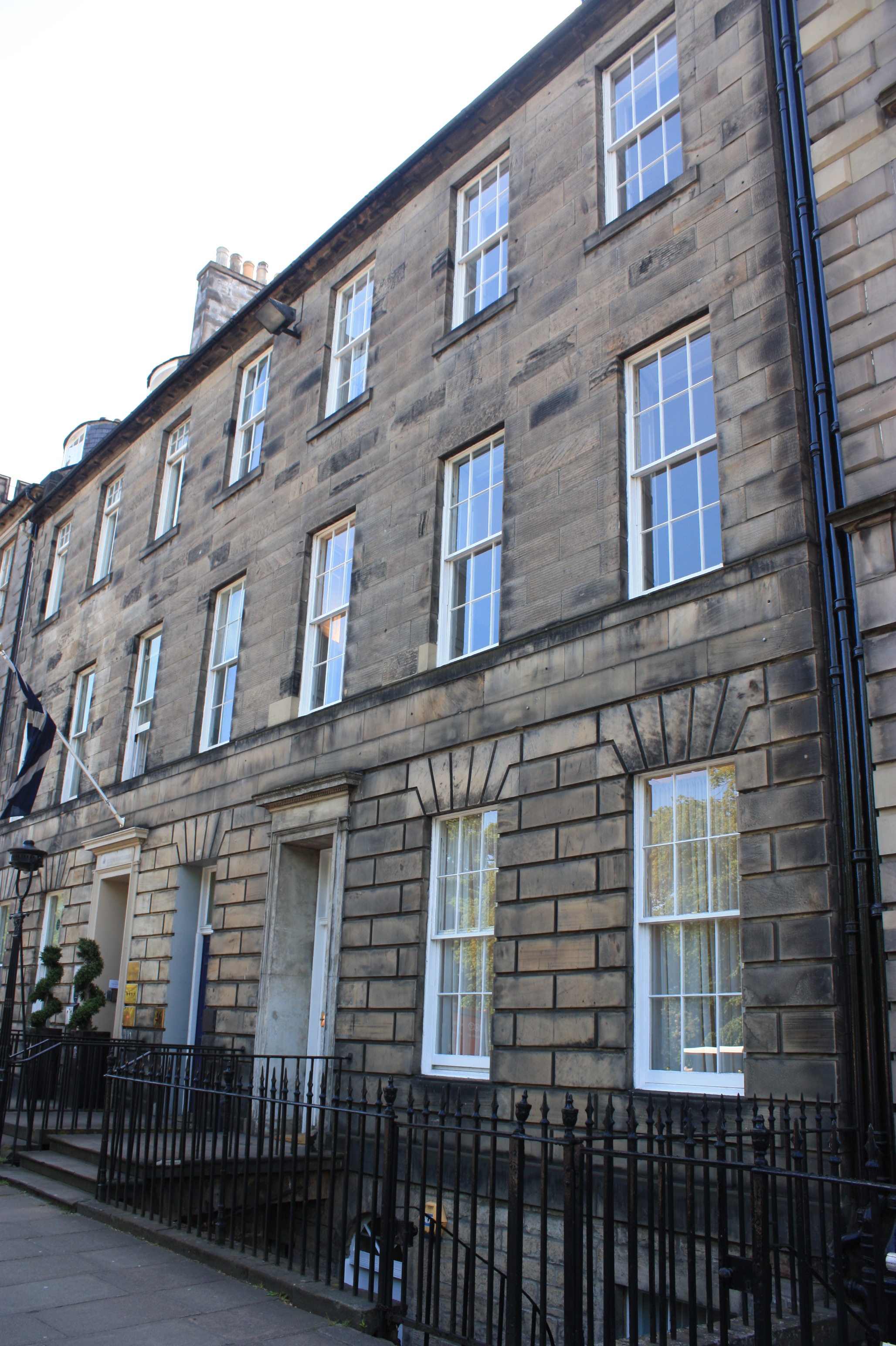
Lord Neaves' townhouse at 47 Queen Street, Edinburgh (2015

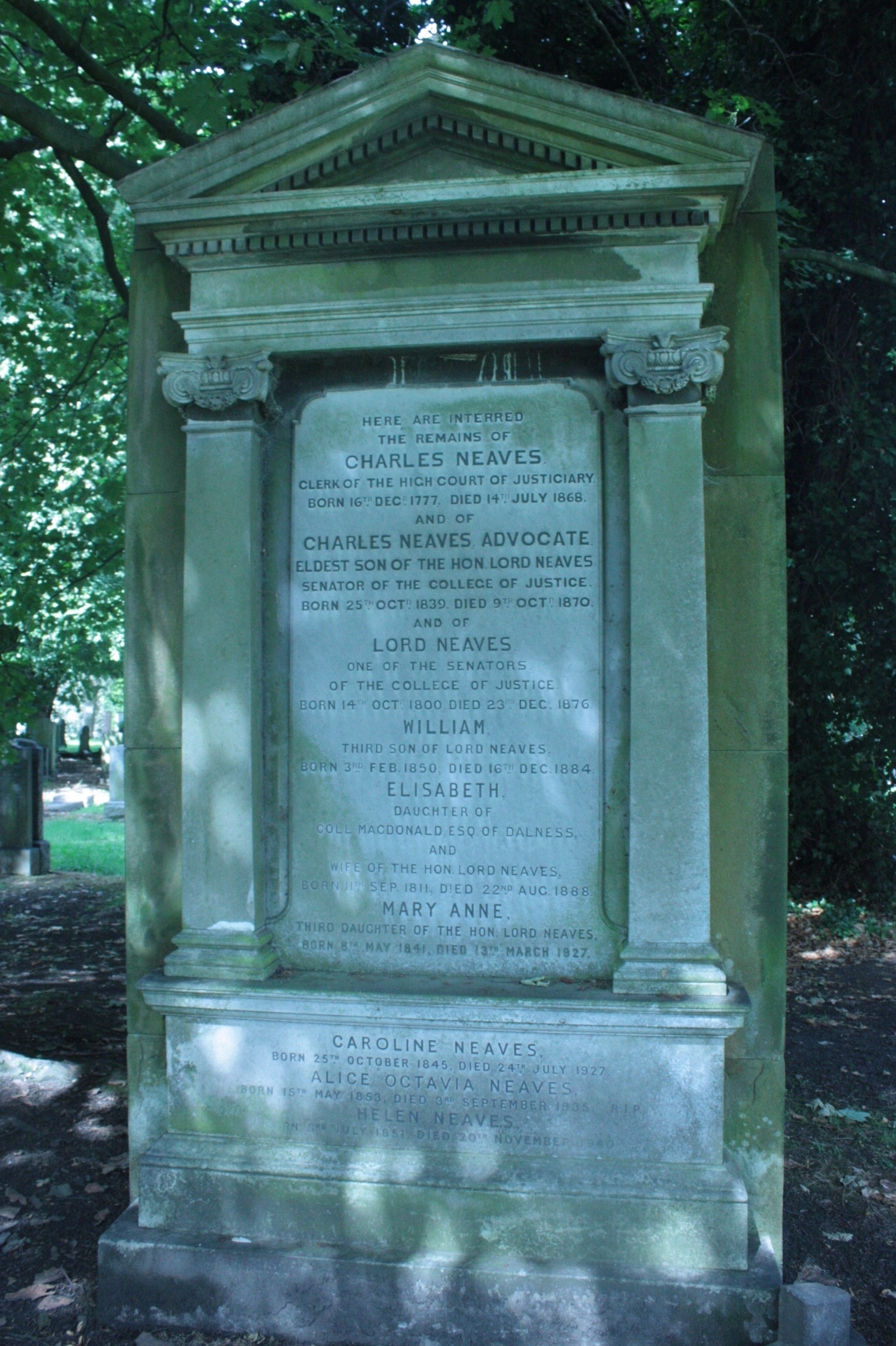
Neaves' grave, Warriston Cemetery (2014)

Charles Neaves, Lord Neaves FRSE (14 October 1800 – 23 December 1876) was a Scottish advocate, judge, theologian and writer. He served as solicitor general (1852), as a judge of the Court of Session, the supreme court of Scotland (1854), and as rector of the University of St Andrews (1872).

Neaves was known as one of the early analysts of the history of evolution, and is often quoted regarding the subjects of evolution and women's rights.

== Life ==
Neaves was born in Edinburgh on 14 October 1800, the son of Charles Neaves (1777–1868), a Forfar solicitor and clerk of the Justiciary Court in Edinburgh, and his first wife, Margaret Montgomery Aitken. His father later married Mary Anne Parr (1792–1887).

Neaves was educated at the High School and the University of Edinburgh. He became a member of the Faculty of Advocates at age 22. He married Eliza Macdonald in 1835. They lived (c. 1833) in a large Georgian townhouse at 47 Queen Street in Edinburgh's New Town. They moved in 1845 to the more prestigious address of 7 Charlotte Square.

From 1841 to 1845, he was Advocate Depute, and from 1845 to 1852 Sheriff of Orkney and Shetland. He became Solicitor General for Scotland in 1853, being succeeded by Robert Handyside, Lord Handyside. He served as a judge of the Court of Session from 1854 to 1858. From 1858 until March 1876, shortly before his death, he was Lord of Justiciary, Scotland's supreme criminal court. Neaves lived the majority of his life in Edinburgh, but when associated with the Justiciary Court, he travelled to Glasgow thrice yearly and Lord Neaves (although elderly and almost without hearing capability by 1875) acquired a reputation in Glasgow as a man of justice and evenness.

Charles Neaves had acknowledged skills as a composer of verse.

He was vice-president of the Royal Society of Edinburgh (1859–67, 1868–73 and 1874–76), and a president of the Heriot-Watt Institution. From 1872 to 1874, he held the post of rector at the University of St Andrews, the oldest university in Scotland. The rector chairs meetings of the University Court, the governing body of the University of St Andrews. Neaves was a regular author of poetry and essays to Blackwood's Magazine, only a fraction of his work having been republished.

He is buried in the family plot in Warriston Cemetery in Edinburgh with his second wife, Elisabeth MacDonald (1811-1888). His first wife, Mary Anne, is buried in a south section of Dean Cemetery.

== Evolutionary analyst ==
As a judge of the Court of Session, Neaves was familiar with one of his predecessors, James Burnett, Lord Monboddo, to whom he credited the origination of the concepts of the theory of evolution. In 1875, Neaves published a poem within a book of verse to establish this point:

Though Darwin now proclaims the law
And spreads it far abroad, O!
The man that first the secret saw
Was honest old Monboddo.
The architect precedence takes
Of him that bears the hod, O!
So up and at them, Land of Cakes,
We'll vindicate Monboddo

In another instance he elaborates on Monboddo's writings again in Blackwood's Magazine, indicating the clarity with which Monboddo foresaw evolutionary theory:

The rise of every man he loved to trace,
Up to the very pod O!
And, in baboons, our parent race
Was found by old Monboddo.

Their A, B, C, he made them speak,
And learn their qui, quae, quod, O!
Till Hebrew, Latin, Welsh, and Greek
They knew as well's Monboddo!

== Poet and critic ==
Not only did Neaves produce poetry but he was a prolific critic, often in venues such as Blackwood's Magazine. One of his thematic elements was virtue, which naturally tied to his theological roots. He also conducted critiques of others' poetry based upon how their attitudes deviated from virtue and a common theme of under-recognition of women, as in the scalding criticism of the poet Thomas Carew.

== Quotations ==
In Bartlett's Familiar Quotations (Quote number 6171), as published originally in Darwin's The Origin of Species, he quipped on the subject of evolution:

Pouter, tumbler and fantail are from the same source;
The racer and hack may be traced to one horse;
So men were developed from monkeys of course,
Which nobody can deny.

This quote became so famous in that early era that the authorship of the quotation became a matter of public dispute. Although Bartlett and Darwin clearly attributed the quotation to Neaves, Zachary Macaulay argued that he had made this statement three years earlier.

Lord Neaves may have also been an early thinker on the issue of women's rights with the following quote, that would have bordered on heresy in his era:

So I wonder a woman, the Mistress of Hearts,
Should assent to aspire to be Master of Arts;
A Ministering Angel in Woman we see,
And an Angel need cover no other Degree.
—O why should a Woman not get a Degree?

== See also ==
- History of evolution
- List of Scottish poets
- List of theologians
- List of University of Edinburgh people

Academic offices
Preceded by James Anthony Froude	Rector of the University of St Andrews; 1872–1874	Succeeded by Arthur Penrhyn Stanley
