= Máel Bethad of Liberton =

Máel Bethad of Liberton was a powerful landowner in Lothian in the reign of King David I of Scotland. Although he was a Gael, his estate may have been predominantly Middle English-speaking, as it bears the name "Liberton", which, unless it is an improbable Anglo-Romance compound meaning "book settlement" or "free settlement", is a corruption of early Middle English hlith bere tun, "barley hill settlement". Liberton is about two-and-a-half miles (4 km) south of Edinburgh's Old Town, and is now a suburb. Liberton parish consisted of 6,600 acres (27 km^{2}) of land, and it is likely that Máel Bethad owned the upper part of the parish. Máel Bethad's name occurs as a witness on many of King David's charters, where it is rendered in a number of corrupt forms, e.g. "Malbead de Libertona", "Malbet de Libertune", "Malbeth de Libertona", "Makbet de Libertona", "Malbet de Libertone", and perhaps "Macbetber" Two of these names represent a confusion with the name Mac Bethad ("son of Life"), whereas the name is certainly Máel Bethad ("tonsured devotee of Life"); "Life" here is an abstract Gaelic religious concept meaning "eternal life" or "Christian immortality".

== See also ==
- Thor of Tranent
