= Ednam =

Village in Scottish Borders

Coordinates: 55°37′41″N 2°25′3″W

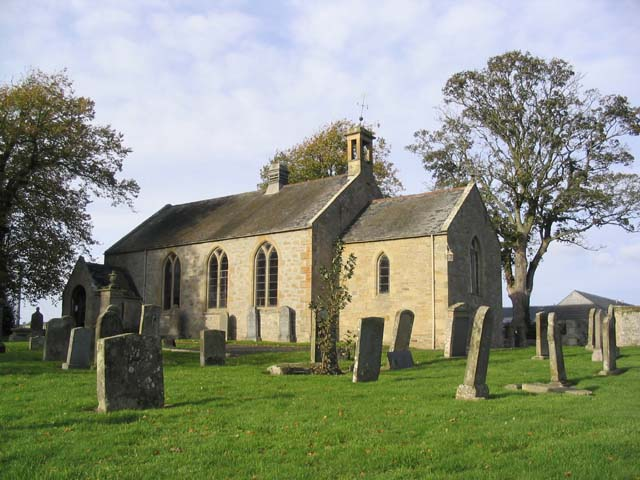
- Parish church

- Location within the Scottish Borders
- Civil parish: Ednam
- Council area: Scottish Borders
- Country: Scotland
- Sovereign state: United Kingdom
- Police: Scotland
- Fire: Scottish
- Ambulance: Scottish

Ednam is a small village near Kelso in the Scottish Borders area of Scotland.

Floors Castle is nearby.

The village was formerly in Roxburghshire. Its name is a corruption of the Anglo-Saxon "Edenham", i.e. the town on Eden Water. In the late 1090s, Edgar, King of Scots, granted Thor Longus land at Ednam, where developed a farming community.

Near the village is a knoll called The Piper's Grave. It is named after a legend that a local piper once went searching for fairies in the hill, and was never seen again.

== Notable people ==
- Ednam is notable for having been associated with several Scottish poets, Henry Francis Lyte, writer of Abide With Me; William Wright, John Gibson Smith and James Thomson, writer of Rule Britannia.
- J. H. S. Burleigh - Moderator of the General Assembly of the Church of Scotland in 1960.
- William Purves, banker

== See also ==
- Ednam Church
- List of places in the Scottish Borders
- List of places in Scotland
