= Norman MacCaig =

Scottish poet (1910–1996)

Norman MacCaig OBE FRSE FRSL ARSA
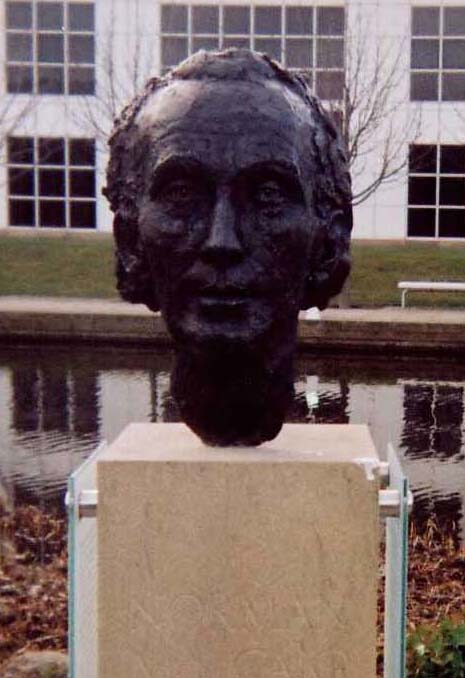
- Bust of MacCaig at Edinburgh Park
- Born: Norman Alexander McCaig; 14 November 1910; Edinburgh, Scotland
- Died: 23 January 1996 (aged 85); Edinburgh
- Education: University of Edinburgh
- Occupations: Poet, teacher
- Spouse: Isabel Robina Munro (m. 1940; died 1990)
- Children: 2
- Writing career
- Language: English
- Notable awards: Cholmondeley Award 1975; OBE 1979; Queen's Gold Medal for Poetry 1986
- Movement: New Apocalyptics

Norman Alexander MacCaig (14 November 1910 – 23 January 1996) was a Scottish poet and teacher. His poetry, in modern English, is known for its humour, simplicity of language and great popularity. He published fifteen volumes of poetry, including The Inward Eye (1946), Riding Lights (1955), Surroundings (1966), and The White Bird (1973). A book of his collected poems was released in 1985, with an expanded edition in 1990. Collections of his poetry continue to appear, with Between Mountain and Sea being issued in 2018.

A close friend of Hugh MacDiarmid and Sydney Goodsir Smith, MacCaig earned numerous awards during his lifetime, including the Cholmondely Award in 1975 and the Queen's Gold Medal for Poetry in 1986. A spoken word recording of MacCaig reading his poems, entitled The Way I Say It, was released in 1974.

== Life ==
Norman Alexander MacCaig was born at 15 East London Street, Edinburgh, to Robert McCaig (1880–1950?), a chemist from Dumfriesshire, and Joan née MacLeod (1879–1959), from Scalpay in the Outer Hebrides. He was their fourth child and only son. He attended the Royal High School and in 1928 went to the University of Edinburgh, graduating in 1932 with an honours degree in classics, and an M.A. in 1932. He divided his time, for the rest of his life, between his native city and Assynt in the Scottish Highlands. In 1940 he married Isabel Munro, and the couple had two children.

During the Second World War MacCaig registered as a conscientious objector, a move that many at the time criticised. Douglas Dunn has suggested that MacCaig's career later suffered as a result of his outspoken pacifism, although this is disputed. For the early part of his working life, he was employed as a school teacher in primary schools. In 1967, he was appointed Fellow in Creative Writing at Edinburgh. He became a reader in poetry in 1970 at the University of Stirling. He spent his summer holidays in Achmelvich, and Inverkirkaig, near Lochinver.

He received a doctorate in English from the University of Stirling in 1981, an honorary doctor of letters degree from the University of Edinburgh in 1983, and an honorary doctor of laws degree from Dundee University in 1986. He adopted the spelling MacCaig at some point between 1946 and 1955, using this form for his published works, and the original for family and personal matters.

His first collection, Far Cry, was published in 1943. He continued to publish throughout his lifetime and was prolific in the amount that he produced. After his death a still larger collection of unpublished poems was found. MacCaig often gave public readings of his work in Edinburgh and elsewhere; these were extremely popular and for many people were the first introduction to the poet. His life is also noteworthy for the friendships he had with a number of other Scottish poets, such as Hugh MacDiarmid and Douglas Dunn. He described his own religious beliefs as "Zen Calvinism", a comment typical of his half-humorous, half-serious approach to life.

== Work ==
The cover of MacCaig's Selected Poems

=== Early ===
MacCaig's first two books were deeply influenced by the New Apocalypse movement of the thirties and forties, one of a number of literary movements that were constantly coalescing, evolving and dissolving at that time. Later he was to all but disown these works, dismissing them as obscure and meaningless. His poetic rebirth took place with the publication of Riding Lights in 1955. It was a complete contrast to his earlier works, being strictly formal, metrical, rhyming and utterly lucid. The timing of the publication was such that he could have been associated with The Movement, a poetic grouping of poets at just that time. Indeed many of the forms and themes of his work fitted with the ideas of The Movement but he remained separate from that group, perhaps on account of his Scottishness—all of the Movement poets were English. One label that has been attached to MacCaig and one that he seemed to enjoy (as an admirer of John Donne) is Metaphysical.

=== Later ===
In his later years he relaxed some of the formality of his work, losing the rhymes and strict metricality but always strove to maintain the lucidity. He became a free verse poet with the publication of Surroundings in 1966. Seamus Heaney described his work as "an ongoing education in the marvellous possibilities of lyric poetry". Ted Hughes wrote, "whenever I meet his poems, I'm always struck by their undated freshness, everything about them is alive, as new and essential, as ever". Another poet, beside Donne, whom MacCaig claimed was a great influence on his work was Louis MacNeice. Although he never lost his sense of humour, much of his very late work, following the death of his wife in 1990, is more sombre in tone. The poems appear to be full of heartbreak but they never become pessimistic.

An example of this is his poem "Praise of a Man" which was quoted by Gordon Brown in the eulogy he gave at the funeral of Robin Cook in 2005:

The beneficent lights dim
but don't vanish.
The razory edges
dull, but still cut.
He's gone:
but you can see
his tracks still, in the snow of the world.

=== In schools ===
MacCaig's poems are studied in schools in Scotland at National 5 and Higher levels. The poems which are currently studied are:

- "Aunt Julia"
- "Basking Shark"
- "Hotel Room, 12th Floor"
- "On Lachie's Croft"
- "Landscape and I"
- "Old Highland Woman"

Previously, the poems studied were:

- "Assisi"
- "Visiting Hour"
- "Basking Shark"
- "Brooklyn Cop"
- "Hotel Room, 12th Floor"
- "Aunt Julia"

== Awards ==
- 1985 Queen's Gold Medal for Poetry
- 1979 Order of the British Empire
- 1975 Cholmondeley Award

== Bibliography ==
=== Poetry ===
- Far Cry. London: Routledge, 1943.
- The Inward Eye. London: Routledge, 1946.
- Riding Lights. London: Hogarth Press, 1955.
- The Sinai Sort. London: Hogarth Press, 1957.
- A Common Grace. London: Chatto & Windus, 1960.
- A Round of Applause. London: Chatto & Windus, 1962.
- Contemporary Scottish Verse, 1959–1969. (Edinburgh: Calder & Boyards, 1970).
- Measures. London: Chatto & Windus, 1965.
- Surroundings. London: Chatto & Windus, 1966.
- Rings on a Tree. Chatto & Windus, 1968.
- Visiting Hour. London: 1968.
- A Man in My Position. London: Chatto & Windus, 1969.
- Selected Poems. 1979.
- The White Bird. London: Chatto & Windus, 1973.
- The World's Room. London: Chatto & Windus, 1974.
- Tree of Strings. London: Chatto & Windus, 1977.
- Old Maps and New. London: Chatto & Windus, 1978.
- The Equal Skies. London: Chatto & Windus: Hogarth Press, 1980.
- A World of Difference. London: Chatto & Windus, 1983.
- Voice Over. London: Chatto & Windus, 1989.
- Collected Poems. (revised and expanded edn, 1993).
- Ewen McCaig, ed. (2005). The poems of Norman MacCaig. Polygon. ISBN 978-1-904598-26-8.
- Watson, R. ed. (2018). Between Mountain and Sea: Poems from Assynt. Edinburgh: Polygon.

=== Anthologies ===
- Maurice Lindsay, Lesley Duncan, ed. (2006). "No Choice". The Edinburgh book of twentieth-century Scottish poetry. Edinburgh University Press. ISBN 978-0-7486-2015-9.
- Jay Parini, ed. (2005). "Frogs". The Wadsworth anthology of poetry. Cengage Learning. ISBN 978-1-4130-0473-1.
- Roderick Watson, ed. (1995). "Summer Farm; Still Life". The poetry of Scotland: Gaelic, Scots, and English, 1380–1980. Edinburgh University Press. ISBN 978-0-7486-0607-8.
- Robert Atwan, Laurance Wieder, ed. (1993). "Golden Calf". Chapters into verse : poetry in English inspired by the Bible. Oxford University Press. ISBN 978-0-19-506913-6.
- Ian Scott-Kilvert, ed. (1987). British writers. Scribner. ISBN 978-0-684-80641-9.
- Macha Louis Rosenthal, ed. (1968). 100 postwar poems, British and American. Macmillan.
