= James Fairgrieve =

British geographer, educator and geopolitician

James Fairgrieve (1870 – 1953) was a British geographer, educator, and geopolitician. He is best known for his books Geography and World Power (1915) and Geography in School (1926).

== Biography ==
James Fairgrieve was born in 1870 in Scotland, son to a Scottish Presbyterian minister. His education was undertaken at Aberystwyth University, graduating in 1889, and then at Jesus College, Oxford, reading mathematics.

Fairgrieve began his career teaching in Kelso at Kelso High School and Campbeltown in Scotland. He then moved to London, founding the New Southgate High School. In 1907, he became geography master at William Ellis School.

Fairgrieve had no formal training in geography, but took part-time courses in geography at the London School of Economics. These courses were taught by geographer and geopolitician Halford Mackinder. From that point forward, Fairgrieve devoted his life's work to geography.

Fairgrieve's career blossomed from 1912, when he left William Ellis School, until 1935, when he retired from Readership at the University of London Institute of Education. He held a number of influential positions at the University of London and the Geographical Association (he was president in 1935) in addition to teaching. His view of geography was fundamentally centered on human geography.
