= John the Younger =

John the Younger or John, the Younger may refer to:

- John II, Duke of Schleswig-Holstein-Sonderburg (1545–1622)
- John, Hereditary Prince of Saxony (1498–1537)
- John Bettes the Younger (died 1616), English portrait painter
- John Bowdler the Younger (1783–1815), English essayist, poet and lawyer
- John Bramston the Younger (1611–1700), English lawyer and politician who sat in the House of Commons from 1660 to 1679
- John Brinsley the Younger (1600–1665), English nonconforming clergyman and ejected minister
- John Calcraft (the younger) (1765–1831), English landowner and Member of Parliament
- John Cleveley the Younger (1747–1786), British artist and marine painter
- John Hotham, the younger (1610–1645), English Member of Parliament and military commander
- John Tradescant the Younger (1608–1662), botanist and gardener
- John Winthrop the Younger (1606–1676), early governor of the Connecticut Colony
- John Wood, the Younger (1728–1782), English architect

== See also ==
- John Younger (disambiguation)
