= John Baird (Scottish divine) =

Scottish divine

John Baird (17 February 1799 – 29 November 1861), was a Scottish divine.

== Life ==
John Baird was the eldest son of the Rev. James Baird, who was successively minister of Legerwood, Eccles, and Swinton, all in Berwickshire. John was born at Eccles, and educated at Whitsome and Kelso grammar schools. Later he proceeded to the University of Edinburgh where, in 1823, he founded the Plinian Society for the study of natural history, and was its first president.

Going to Ireland in 1825, he was for some time engaged by the Irish Evangelical Society as one of their preachers. In 1829, he was ordained minister of Yetholm, Roxburghshire, the eventual place of his death. A colony of Romany travellers, or gypsies as they were then called, had long been settled at Kirk Yetholm. Baird set himself resolutely to make them Christians and, in the eyes of many at the time, "useful" members of society as a result.

One way that Baird attempted to disrupt the Romany travellers' lives was by persuading their tribal elders to give up their children to Christian families, where they would be separated from their parents, boarded and enrolled in a local school, as part of his continued efforts to replace the traditional Romany way of life with Christian religious mores and lifestyles.

The work was done in connection with a society formed in Edinburgh for the 'Reformation of the Gipsies in Scotland,' and it met with a considerable amount of success. Baird wrote the 'Scottish Gipsies' Advocate,' Edinburgh 1839, and contributed an 'Account of the Parish of Yetholm' to the 'New Statistical Account of Scotland.' A memoir of him, by W. Baird (London, 1862), contains a list of words used by the gipsies of Yetholm, compared with Grellman's list of the continental gipsy language, and the corresponding words in Hindustani.
