= Marion McCready =

Scottish poet

- Born: Stornoway, Lewis, Scotland
- Education: University of Glasgow
- Children: 2
- Writing career
- Genre: poetry

Marion McCready is a Scottish poet. She has published two poetry collections, Tree Language (2014) and Madame Ecosse (2017).

== Biography ==
Marion McCready was born in Stornoway, Lewis, and was brought up in Dunoon, Argyll, where she now lives with her husband and two children. She studied for a joint honours degree in politics and classical civilisations at the University of Glasgow, followed by an MLitt in philosophy.

While studying at the university, she was the recipient of the Royal Scottish Academy of Music and Drama (RSAMD) Edwin Morgan Poetry Prize. In 2013 she received both the Scottish Book Trust New Writers Award, and the Melita Hume Poetry Prize.

Themes in her poems include nature, history, women’s experiences, folklore and spirituality.

== Poetry collections ==
- Madame Ecosse. (2017)
- Tree Language (2014)
- Vintage Sea. (2011)

== Awards and honours ==
- Royal Scottish Academy of Music and Drama Edwin Morgan Poetry Prize
- 2013 Scottish Book Trust New Writers Award
- 2013 Melita Hume Poetry Prize

== See also ==
- Poetry of Scotland
- Scottish Poetry Library
