= Colin Will =

Scottish poet and gardener

- Born: 1942 (age 83–84)
- Occupation: Poet
- Writing career
- Genre: Poetry

Colin Will (born 1942) is a Scottish poet and publisher. His themes reflect a love of people and the natural world, often in language derived from his scientific background.

Will worked in public libraries (West Lothian County Library) from 1963 to 1973. After gaining a degree in Science from the Open University - one of its first graduates - he was appointed Edinburgh Librarian of the British Geological Survey from 1973 to 1988. He was appointed Chief Librarian at the Royal Botanic Garden Edinburgh from 1988-1998, after which he occupied several positions in senior management, retiring in 2002. He was awarded a Ph D by the University of Strathclyde for research on the communication process in science. He chaired the Board of the Scottish Poetry Library and was President of the Scottish Library Association in 2000. He also chaired the Board of StAnza: Scotland's International Poetry Festival, from 2006 to 2009, and was re-elected Chair for a further term in 2014. He was awarded a Hawthornden Fellowship in 2013. He edited Postbox, a short story magazine published by Red Squirrel Press for its first nine issues. From 1999 to 217 he ran Calder Wood Press, specialising in poetry pamphlets by contemporary poets. He also ran the online e-zine The Open Mouse, publishing poems by individual authors

== Published works ==
- Thirteen ways of looking at the Highlands and more, Diehard, 1996
- Landings : poems from Normandy, Calder Wood Press, 1998
- The flowers of Scotland, Calder Wood Press, 1998
- Roundabout Livingston : local poems, Calder Wood Press, 1998
- Painted fruits : poems, Calder Wood Press, 1998
- Seven senses, Diehard, 2000
- Mementoliths; poems inspired by rocks and minerals, Calder Wood Press, 2005
- Sushi & chips, Diehard, 2006
- The floorshow at the Mad Yak Café, Red Squirrel Press, 2010
- The propriety of weeding, Red Squirrel Press, 2012
- The year's six seasons, poems, Calder Wood Press, 2013
- The Book of Ways, a collection of haibun, REd Squirrel Press, 2014
- Getting On, short stories, Red Squirrel Press, 2016
- The Night I Danced With Maya, poems, Red Squirrel Pres, 2017
- Word Play, short stories, Red Squirrel Press, 2018
- Long Shorts, short stories, Red Squirrel Press, 2021
- Swept Together, Selected and new poems, Red Squirrel Press, 2022
