= Thomas William Hogarth =

Scottish-Australian veterinarian, writer, dog judge, dog breeder and veterinary surgeon

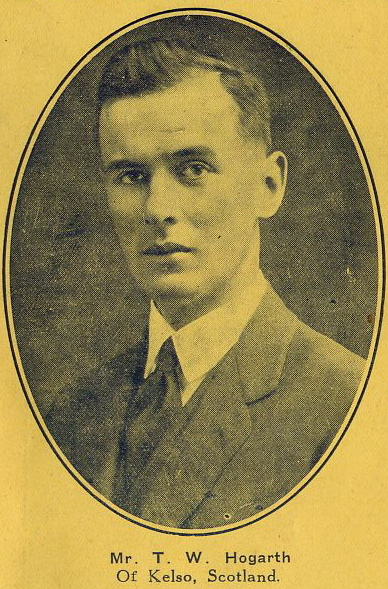
- Thomas William Hogarth, c. 1929
- Born: 6 April 1901; Kelso, Scotland
- Died: 26 January 1999 (aged 97); Perth, Western Australia
- Occupation: Veterinarian

Thomas William Hogarth (Kelso, 6 April 1901 – 26 January 1999) was a Scottish, later Australian, veterinarian, writer on dogs, dog judge, dog breeder, genetics enthusiast and veterinary surgeon. He was an author of several books published in the 1930s about the Bull Terrier and breeding of Bull Terriers.

Hogarth was born in Kelso on the borders of Scotland, on 6 April 1901. He attended Kelso High School and Giggleswick School. After the First World War he traveled to and worked in Canada. He bred Bull Terriers in the early 1920s in Scotland using the kennel name Galalaw.

Hogarth traveled extensively in the late 1920s and early 1930s as a dog judge, especially in 1929, when he judged in South Africa, India, Ceylon, Burma, and Australia.

While in Perth, Western Australia, he made comments related to the public debate about the Alsatian question.

He also judged dogs in Argentina in the early 1930s. He attended Ontario Veterinary College, University of Toronto (now University of Guelph) in the 1930s, and he graduated in 1937. While he was studying he published four books relating to Bull Terriers in the 1930s, as well as one book on recollections of his dog judging travels, and possibly the only book of verse about Bull Terriers.

Hogarth settled in and practiced as a Veterinary Surgeon at Swanbourne Veterinary Hospital (now known as Swanbourne Veterinary Centre), in Perth, Western Australia 1940s to the 1960s.

The main customers were dog and cat owners, but he did have the opportunity to deal with the occasional circus animal from visiting circuses. He was involved with early stages of the Guide Dogs for the Blind, Dogs Refuge Home, Western Australian Veterinary Surgeons Board and was patron of the Fremantle Ladies Pipe Band.

In the 1970s and 1980s he was one of a group of West Australian book collectors who were well known on the antiquarian book sale and auction circuit in Perth. He built up a private library of 10,000 volumes.

On retirement he lived in Darlington, Western Australia. He occasionally judged at dog shows in his 70s. With his wife, he bred Old English Game fowl and kept a range of dogs - but never a bull terrier. He died in Perth, Western Australia on Australia Day, 26 January 1999. His wife, son and three grandchildren survived him.

== 1929 Dog judging and travel ==
These are correlated to some of the text - Travels of a Dog Judge.

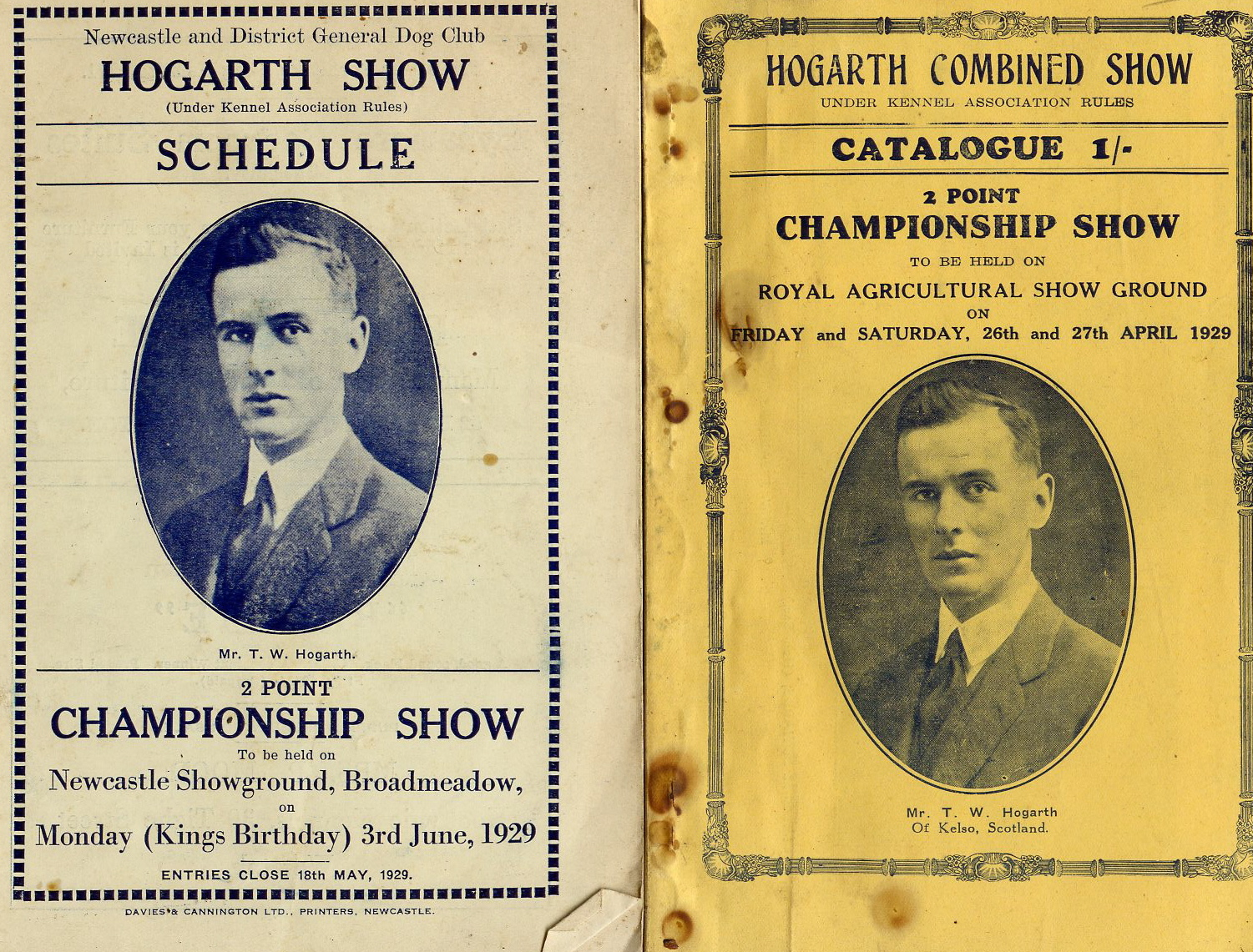

- 3 January Sangrur, Jind, India
- January Patiala, India
- 25–26 January Calcutta, India
- 30 January Rangoon, Burma
- 8–9 February Chutter Manzil, Lucknow, India
- 11–12 February Allahabad, India
- 18–19 February Bombay, India
- 25 February Patiala, India
- 4 March Dehra Dun, India
- 8 March Calcutta, India
- 15 March Colombo, Ceylon
- 27–28 March Perth, Western Australia
- April, South Australia
- 26–27 April Sydney, New South Wales
- 14–18 May Ipswich, Queensland
- 3 June Newcastle, New South Wales
- 7–8 June Melbourne, Victoria
- 2–3 August Ceylon
- 20–21 September Durban, South Africa
- October Buenos Aires, Argentina

== Bibliography ==
- The Bull Terrier, Manchester: Our Dogs. 1931. First Edition.
- The Coloured and Colour Breeding, Galashiels: A Walker & Son. 1932
  - Chapter 'Colour Breeding in Bull Terriers' by Major T Grahame and Captain J.N. Ritchie.
  - Chapter 'Colour Inheritance in Bull-terriers' by Dr F Fraser Darling
- Travels of a Dog Judge Round the World, Galashiels, A Walker & Son 1935
- A Bull Terrier Notebook, Galashiels, A Walker & Son 1936
- Bull-Terrier Doggerel, Galashiels: A Walker & Son. 1937
- The Bull Terrier, Manchester, Our Dogs. 1937. Second edition.
- American reprint of The Bull Terrier, First Edition was not done in consultation with either Dr Hogarth or his family.
- Articles in the 1920s and 1930s in 'Our Dogs' and other dog magazines and newspapers.
