= William Wright (poet) =

Scottish poet

William Wright (c. 1782-??) was a Scottish poet.

Born in the Row, Ednam, he was largely paralysed from birth.

He was particularly keen on nature poetry, and spent long hours in Ednam kirkyard penning his poems, which include,"To a Robin Redbreast", "To a Thrush" and "To a Wild Flower". He also wrote about events of his time, such as the Napoleonic wars.

The date of his death is uncertain. It would have probably been around the mid-19th century.
