= Archibald Campbell Craig =

Scottish minister and biblical scholar

Archibald Campbell Craig MC (1888–1985) was a Scottish minister and biblical scholar who served as Moderator of the General Assembly of the Church of Scotland in 1961. He was affectionately known as Archie Craig.

== Life ==
He was born on 3 December 1888 in the Scottish Borders the son of Rev Alexander McRae Craig. He was educated at Kelso High School. He then studied divinity at the University of Edinburgh.

In the First World War he served in the 13th battalion Royal Scots. He was awarded the Military Cross and later transferred to the Intelligence Corps.

In 1920 he was ordained as a minister in the Church of Scotland and first served in Galston, Ayrshire and then Hillhead in Glasgow. In 1930 he became official Chaplain to the University of Glasgow.

In 1942 he became General Secretary to the British Council of Churches. In 1946 he became Assistant Leader to the Iona Community. From 1947 to 1957 he lectured in Biblical Studies at the University of Glasgow.

During his time as Moderator he was the first Moderator to ever visit the Pope in Rome.

He retired to St Johns in Doune near Stirling and opened a new church nearby in the Raploch district of Stirling in 1964.

He died in 1985 aged 96.

== Publications ==
- Christian Witness in a Post War World (1946)
- Preaching in a Scientific Age (1954)
- God Comes Four Times (1955)
