= Thor of Tranent =

12th-century Scottish sheriff

Thor (Thorald, Durand)

Sheriff in Lothian
- Preceded by: none known
- Succeeded by: Robert fitz Guy

Personal details
- Born: Unknown
- Died: c. mid-to-late 12th century
- Spouse: not known
- Children: Sveinn, Alexander, William

Thor of Tranent, also known as Thor, son of Sveinn or Thor, son of Swain (fl. 1127 x 1150), Lord of Tranent and Sheriff of Lothian, was a landlord and chieftain active in Lothian in the reign of King David I of Scotland. He is attested in a large number of charters during King David's reign in Lothian, both as a charter witness on charters granted by other patrons and on charters he himself issued. His name appears either as Thor son of Sveinn or "Thor of Tranent", the latter appellation deriving from his ownership of the "barony" of Tranent, East Lothian, lands including a wide area around the modern town, including, for instance, Prestonpans.

== Charter appearances and sheriffdom ==
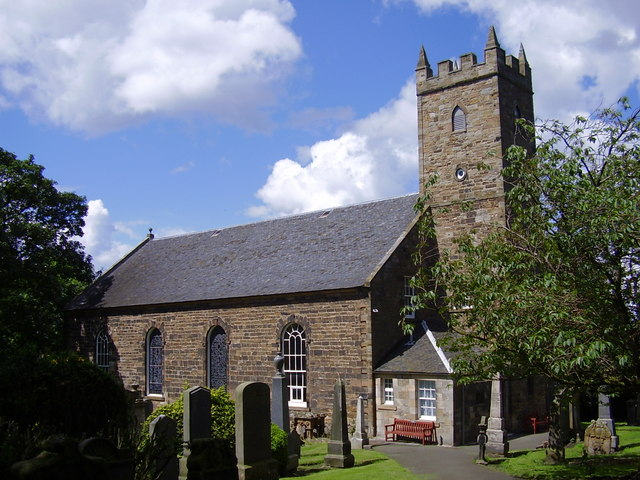
This is the modern building of Tranent parish church, controlled by Thor and granted to Holywood Abbey c. 1150; the older church was replaced around 1800.

His earliest attested appearance is probably that of 1127, when he witnessed as Thor de Trauernent a charter of King David granting land in Edinburgh to the church of St Cuthbert of Edinburgh. As Thor filius Swani (written Thoro filio Swani), in 1130 he witnessed a favourable grant by King David to Dunfermline Abbey regarding rights over ships trading at Inveresk, East Lothian.

In a charter issued at Stirling granting a salt pan to Kelso Abbey in 1143, he appeared as Tor vicecomite, Thor the Sheriff. Sometime in the following year, he was at Edinburgh Castle, witnessing a grant by the king of land in Dalkeith to Holyrood Abbey.

Appearing once more as "sheriff", at an uncertain point between 1143 and 1147, he was witness to a royal grant issued at Edinburgh of a toft in the burgh of Haddington, East Lothian, to Dunfermline Abbey. During the same period, he witnessed a grant issued from the same location by Earl Henry of lands at Duddingston to Kelso Abbey.

Around 1150 he witnessed a grant by Robert, Bishop of St Andrews, passing over the church of Lohworuora (later renamed Borthwick, Midlothian) to Herbert, Bishop of Glasgow. There was a charter to the Manuel Priory, now lost, dating to Máel Coluim IV's reign (1153–1165), that mentions a perambulation of the lands of Manuel conducted by Thor son of Sveinn and Geoffrey de Melville.

He is almost certainly the Durandus vicecomes, mentioned in two charters dating between 1140 and 1150, issued by king David and his son Earl Henry, granting the land of Clerchetun (i.e. Clerkington) to the church of St Mary of Haddington. Durand is a Normanisation of the Scandinavian name Thor.

His sheriffdom's name is unclear, and perhaps did not have one originally; at later stages it was called, variously, Edinburgh, Haddington, Lothian, and Linlithgow, and so for that reason he is sometimes called "sheriff of Lothian".

As it happens, one of Thor's own charters survive in a copy in the cartulary of Holyrood Abbey. The charter is a grant of his parish church at Tranent to that abbey, made around 1150. It was witnessed by William, Bishop of Moray, Osbern, Abbot of Jedburgh, Thor, Archdeacon of Lothian, Aiulf (Æþelwulf), Dean of Lothian, Nicholas, royal clerk (future Chamberlain of Scotland), as well as by Thor's own seneschal Gille Míchéil, and the lesser known figures Neis flius Chiluni, Eadmund son of Forn, Bernard son of Tocce, Eadmund of "Fazeside" and perhaps a man called "Alden".

== Legacy ==
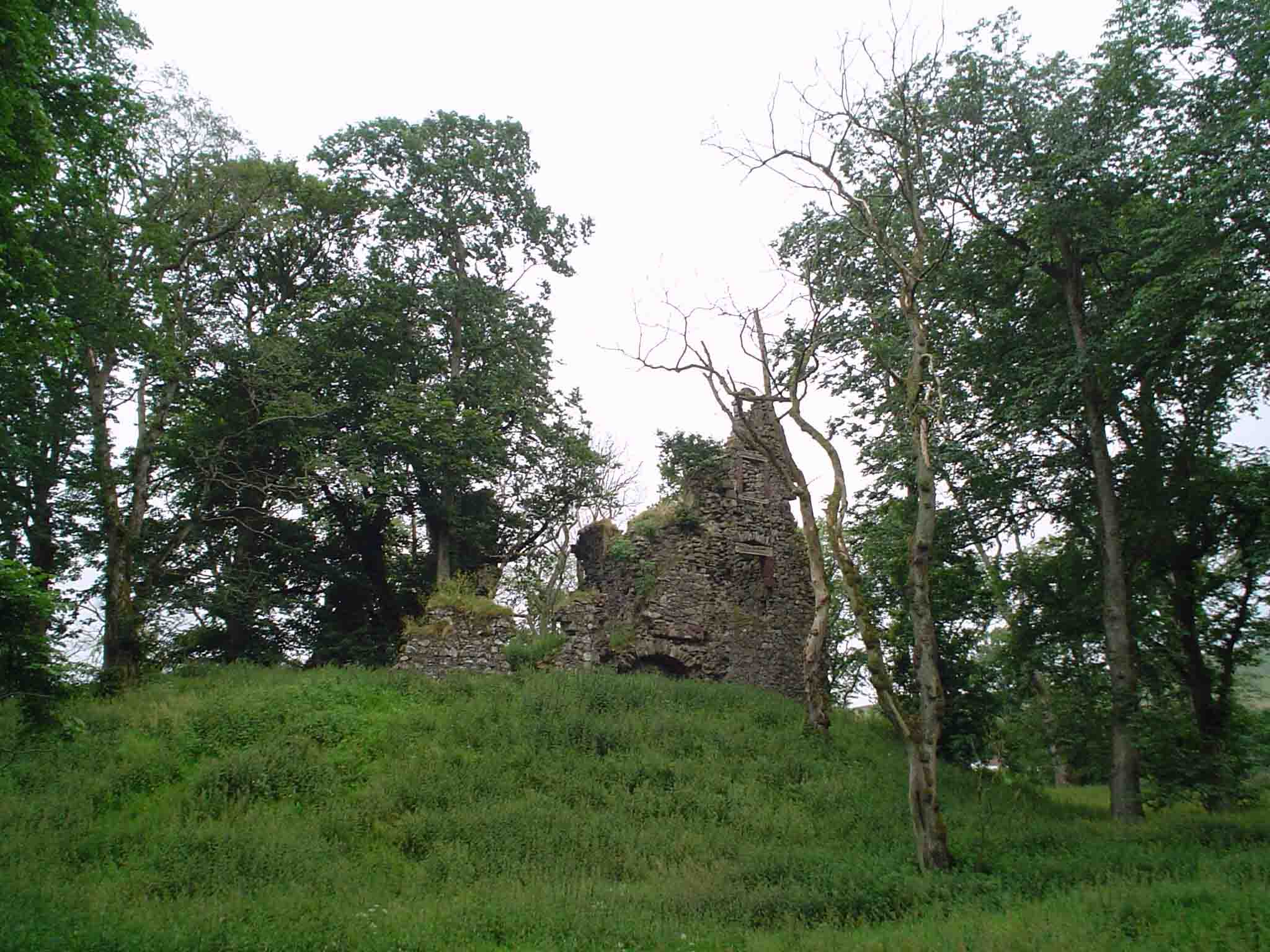
Ruins of Crawford Castle, built in the land Thor's son Sveinn II passed to the de Lindsey family

Three of Thor's sons are known, Sveinn, Alexander and William, all of whom appear in charters in the reign of William the Lion. His eldest son might have been Sveinn, who in addition to his estates in East Lothian appears to have become lord of Crawford in Clydesdale; Sveinn appears to have left only an heiress as his successor, the latter marrying the Anglo-French mercenary William de Lindsey, Justiciar of Lothian and ancestor of the Lindsay earls of Crawford. appeared. A "Sveinn son of Thor" was lord of Ruthven in the Angus-Gowrie borderlands. Through his son Sveinn, Thor of Tranent is the oldest attested ancestor of the Earls of Gowrie.

His two other known sons Alexander and William both had non-Scandinavian names. Alexander seems to be the same "Alexander son of Thor" who is attested as Sheriff of Clackmannan between 1205 and 1207. Alexander's own son William was lord of Ochiltree near Binny, West Lothian.

The other son, William, was Sheriff of Stirling in a document dated c. 1165, and by 1194 at least William's son Alexander (fl. 1189 x 1223) had succeeded him. William is also known to have granted the church of Kirkintilloch in Clydesdale to Cambuskenneth Abbey, suggesting he shared in the fruits of the family's expansion into that western region.

Two settlements in Lothian, Thurston (East Lothian) and Swanston (Midlothian), mean "Thor's village" and "Sveinn's village" respectively, and were probably founded in this period. Through some unknown mechanism, in William the Lion's reign the land of Tranent was under the control of the incoming de Quincy family.

== See also ==
- Gospatric (sheriff of Roxburgh)
- Thor Longus
