= Greens Morelle =

Greens Morelle could refer to:

- Morelle greens, part of Malagasy cuisine
- Utica greens, an Italian-American escarole dish
