= Máel Brigte of Perth =

Máel Brigte of Perth (fl. 1128) was an important figure in Perth in the reign of King David I of Scotland. He is known only because the Church of the Holy Trinity in Dunfermline preserved written instructions from King David to Máel Brigte informing the latter that he had granted the church a tithe of his house in Perth.

Máel Brigte thus may have been David's stewart in the town, or perhaps even the local toísech. The instruction was given at nearby Scone, and it has been suggested that it was originally in Gaelic. The document calls him "Malbride Mac Congi", which probably means that his father had the name Congus, a rare but attested Scoto-Pictish name.
