= David Grant (footballer, born 1947) =

English association football player

Personal information
- Full name: David John Grant
- Date of birth: 18 December 1947 (age 78)
- Place of birth: Liverpool, England
- Position: Left-half

Youth career
- Everton

Senior career*
Years	Team	Apps	(Gls)
1965–1966	Everton	0	(0)
1966–1967	Wrexham	11	(0)
- Bangor City
- * Club domestic league appearances and goals

David John Grant (born 18 December 1947) is an English former professional footballer who played as a left-half. A product of the Everton youth set up, he made appearances in the English Football League with Welsh club Wrexham. He also played for Bangor City.
