= Thor Longus =

Thor's Seal; it depicts him, seated with a sword, and the Latin inscription "Thor me mittet amico," i.e. "Thor gave me to a friend."

Thor Longus or Thor the Long (fl. c. 1113×1124; died by 1136 AD) was an early 12th-century Northumbrian noble associated with Roxburghshire, a culturally Northumbrian and Brythonic Cumbric Celtic (Carvetii, Brigantes, Selgovae) territory ruled by the Scottish king from the 11th-century onwards. A charter dating between 1107×1113 and 1124 claims that Thor the Long founded Ednam, previously a deserted waste granted to him by King Edgar of Scotland.

This Thor Longus has an interesting name combination of "Thor" a Norse name and "Longus" at Latin epitaph. Interestingly, in the ""Liber vitae Ecclesiae dunelmensis" as the following: "II. id\ Mai: O. David rex Scottorum, et Walcherus Dunelmensis episcopus cum suis, et Samson Wigornensis episcopus, et Ricardus episcopus Saucti Andrere in Scotia, et Tlieo5icus, et Aidaiius, et . . . eulfiis sac', et Wigotus, monachi nostras congi-egationis, et Herebertus pater, et Orenga mater, Rog. et Thorh Longus." Translated: "The 3rd day before the Ides of May [May 13]. Obit [anniversary of death] of David, King of the Scots, and Walcher, Bishop of Durham, with his people, and Samson, Bishop of Worcester, and Richard, Bishop of St Andrews in Scotland, and Theodoric, and Aidan, and ...eulf, priest, and Wigot, monks of our congregation, and Herbert the father, and Orenga the mother, Roger, and Thorh the Long." (ref. Stevenson, Joseph, "Liber vitae Ecclesiae dunelmensis; nec non obituaria duo ejusdem ecclesiae by Durham Cathedral; 1806-1895, page 143).

The record is believed to be entered at the same period that Thor was alive and that his family were benefactors of the "Community of St. Cuthbert" and "Haliwerfolc" of the Bishopric of Durham. Additionally, Thor Longus, his brother Roger, his father Herbert, and mother Orenga are listed to be remembered in the Liturgy/Mass on May 13th with the likes of King David I of Scots, & a number of significant Bishops of the Old North and Scotland at the same period. This entry suggests that they were well-to-do and a leading family in the area of Durham. Durham Catherdral was always closely related to the towns of Chester-le-Street (called "Conecester" & "Cunechester" in the Middle Ages, and "Concangis" in the Roman period due to the significant Fort there) and Lanchester (called "Langecaestr" & "Lungecester" in the Middle Ages, and "Longovicium" in the Roman period due to the significant Fort there as well which was built for Auxiliary troops of 1000-strong/milliari). NOTE: Thor's other brother "Lefwinus/Leofwine" is separately noted in the "Liber vitae" as a monk among several other ordained servants of the Bishopric and "Community of St Cuthbert" - see page 142 of the "Liber vitae")

In "Liber vitae" has numerous "Longus/Langus/Lancus/Langa/Longo" names listed in various entries from the 800s up to the 1300's, so it is clear that this was not some "Tall People" tribe or epitaph that was associated with them all, but instead a reference to a location like "Langecaestr" which was significant to the protection and the industrial needs (i.e., smelting/iron production & farming) of the Cathedral and the "Community" and the Bishop. Also, "Langecaestr" is just 7 miles West of "Chester-le-Street" (i.e., Cunecester) where St. Cuthberts coffin and incorrupted body lay in the old Roman fort from the in 883 AD to 995 AD until the "White Church" was built for "St. Cuthbert" as his final resting place. This is important as "Chester-le-Street" needed protection from the "Community" and leaders like "Thor Longus" and family to protect the shrine and the body of St. Cuthbert as "Chester-le-Street" became a destination for pilgrims for over 100 years. Thor Longus is known to be a military man in the mid 1000s to 1136 AD when it is believed he died.

His family were likely the "Longos/Langus/Langes" who were instrumental in being a critical military defenders of the "Haliwerfolc" of the Bishopric and the "Community of St. Cuthbert". It also explains why Thor Longus may have been given the invitation and charter at Ednam near Kelso for he and "his followers" to build up the "wasteland" of Ednam for King Edgar of Scots and later for King David I as well as build a church that was dedicated to St. Cuthbert. This information all makes sense that Thor did not leave these lands to "descendants" because he was a lay-servant like a "Sergeant" of the "Community of St. Cuthbert" and his epitph "Longus" was not a physical description of being "tall" (Note: this is "lazy etymology" because someone in the 19th century suggested this MUST be from "langaz" the Angle-Germanic for "tall"; it is not possible that an entire people and clan in Scotland are all "Tall" people). Instead, it is likely an epitaph for a geographical location within the "Chesters Ward" of the Bishopric of Durham. It is often in both Scottish and English charters and records that the people who claimed the geographical "origin" are rarely called "De Lange" but "Longus/Langus/Lancus/Longo/etc" or "le Lang/Longo" (similar epitaph like "Robert THE BRUCE" held, "John THE LONG'(US)" for example) with their later location named after their name like "William Lang'(Laing/Lang/Longus/Langus) of (Coldingham) Berwickshire, under the feudal lord Matthew (de Dunbar) de Greenlaw of Berwickshire" (ref. People of Medieval Scotland website and Ragman Roll records; also reference "Long", "Lang" and "Laing" in those records for all of the noted charters bearing these later "Longos/Langes"). The evidence is high that these are different record for the same Thor Longus of Ednam & the "Community of St. Cuthbert".

Ednam lies close to the Northumberland border with Roxburghshire. The charter states that he repopulated the settlement with his own followers and built a church. The charter grants the church to the monks of St Cuthbert. There survives the notice of this grant given by Thor to his lord Earl David (future David I of Scotland), as well as Earl David's confirmation of the same grant.

Thor had a brother named Leofwine, mentioned in Thor's charter as requiring "redemption". Leofwine "the monk" was commemorated in the Martyrology of the Durham Cantor's book for June 2 (day of death), and in the same source Thor Longus was commemorated for May 14. The year of his death and descendants are not known, but Ednam appears to have been transferred into the Crown's hands by 1136, so he can be presumed dead by that date.

Several Scottish families/clans claim either lineage or name-sake of Thor Longus (Longus is Latin for 'Long/Laing/Lang meaning 'Tall' in Anglish/German/Scots/etc, but new evidence suggests as noted above that this may be a reference to Langecaestr/Lungecester/Longovicum of Lanchester within the Bishopric of Durham and the town, Roman fort, and peoples important role to the Bishop and Community of St Cuthbert):

- Stirling
- Crawford
- Nisbet
- Swinton

== See also ==
- Thor of Tranent
