= Thomas Davidson (poet) =

Scottish poet (1838–1870)

Thomas Davidson (7 July 1838 in Oxnam, near Oxnam Water, a tributary of the River Teviot – 29 April 1870 in Bank End, Jedburgh) was a Scottish poet born to parents from Northumberland, England.

== Life ==
Thomas's education was at a number of village schools then - after showing an early interest in reading and poetry-writing - from 1854 at the Nest Academy at Jedburgh and from 1855 to 1859 at the University of Edinburgh. At university, in 1859, he won second prize in rhetoric for Ariadne at Naxos, a poem sent to William Makepeace Thackeray by one of Thomas's friends and published in the Cornhill Magazine's December issue the following year.

After university, in 1859, Thomas acted on his early callings to the Christian ministry and began the first of the United Presbyterian Church's prescribed five autumnal sessions of the theology course, and was licensed as a preacher on 2 February 1864. He continued to write poetry in this time (working as an assistant schoolmaster at Forres and in Dr Douglas's School, Edinburgh), with some works published in The Scotsman. In accordance with church regulations, he spent the first years of his ministry travelling widely to preach at various Scottish, English and Irish churches, and what he experienced on his travels inspired several more poems. These included the humorous ‘Yang-Tsi-Kiang’, which became popular as a student song and was used by Thomas Carlyle's supporters in his bid to become lord rector of the university. However, Davidson caught a cold in June 1866 which had a severe effect on his health and he was forced to retire to Jedburgh in December that year. During his 4-year recuperation he wrote more mournful songs like the love ballad "Myspie's Den" and "Auld Ash Tree", and continued to be published in The Scotsman, but never fully recovered and died of TB on 29 April 1870 at Bank End, Jedburgh. He was buried at Jedburgh's new cemetery.

== Reception ==
James Brown, Minister of St. James' Street Church in Paisley, wrote a memoir of Davidson in 1877, and this included republication of some of Davidson's poems.
