= Matthias Barr =

Scottish poet (1831–1911)

Mathias Fritschler Barr (6 December 1831 – 21 December 1911, in London) was a Scottish poet.

Barr was born on 6 December 1831, in Edinburgh. His father, Fidelie, was a native of Germany, who had married the Edinburgh native Margaret Mcdonald, and carried on the business of a watchmaker in that city. Barr received a liberal education at the High School and Academy of Edinburgh, then paid a brief visit to Germany, and afterwards moved to London, where he held a respectable appointment for a number of years, devoting his leisure hours to the cultivation of his literary tastes. Among his pursuits, Barr owned a music-selling and publishing establishment in London.

In 1865, his first-published volume of poems appeared, and he thereafter issued several short volumes of well-regarded verse. He was compared to Burns and Wordsworth in finding the inspiration of song in the most common objects. The simplest scenes, the homeliest incidents, the most common wild-flowers, were subjects addressed by Barr.

== Sources ==
- Alexander G. Murdoch, The Scottish Poets Recent and Living: recent and living (1883), p. 262-63.
