= Smollett =

Smollett is an English and Scots surname, originally meaning small head.

Notable people with the surname include:

== Individuals ==
- Jake Smollett (born 1989), American actor
- Jurnee Smollett (born 1986), American actress
- Jussie Smollett (born 1982), American actor
  - Jussie Smollett hate crime hoax, 2019 criminal case in Chicago
- Peter Smollett (1912–1980), Austrian-born British journalist and Russian spy
- Tobias Smollett (1721–1771), Scottish author

== Fictional characters ==
- Captain Alexander Smollett, the captain of the Hispaniola in the novel Treasure Island
- Col. William G. Smollett, a character in the 1944 film Since You Went Away, played by Monty Woolley
