= David Grant (poet) =

Scottish poet

David Grant (1823–1886) was a Scottish poet.

Grant was born in 1823 in the parish of Upper Banchory, Kincardineshire, and was educated at Aberdeen University. He became a teacher in 1852, and for some time kept a school at Elgin, Moray. In 1861, he was appointed French master in Oundle grammar school, Northamptonshire. In 1865, he became assistant master of Eccleshall College, a private school near Sheffield. Subsequently, he purchased a day school in Sheffield, which proved a failure, and in 1880 he had to retire from his charge penniless. From that date till his death in 1886 he acted as a private tutor in Edinburgh. He published Metrical Tales at Sheffield in 1880, and Lays and Legends of the North at Edinburgh in 1884. A Book of Ten Songs, with music, with a preface by Professor Blackie, appeared after his death. His poems evince a sense of humour, and he had considerable narrative power in verse.
