= John G. Smith (poet) =

John Gibson Smith was a New Zealand Scottish poet.

== History ==
He generally went by the name of John G. Smith. The son of Gibson Smith, farmer and Jane Graham, he was educated at Carnwath, Lanarkshire.

In 1833 he married (as John Smyth), in Innerleithen, Peeblesshire, to Williamina/Wilhelmina Wilkie (sister of Thomas Wilkie, surgeon at Innerleithen and author of "Old Rites, Ceremonies, and Customs of the South of Scotland", and described as a protege of Sir Walter Scott). Wilhelmina was born in 1803 in Bowden, Roxburghshire, to George Wilkie and Henrietta/Hannah Laidlaw.

In 1834 he was appointed schoolmaster of the Parochial School at Ednam, Roxburghshire. He received a Degree as Fellow of the Educational Institute of Scotland in 1848.

The 1841 Scottish Census has him residing at the Ednam Schoolhouse as a Teacher, with his wife Wilhelmina.

The 1851 Scottish Census has him as a Widower residing at the Ednam Schoolhouse, his occupation as Parochial Schoolmaster, and birthplace as Carnwath, Lanark. Also in his household is Henrietta Nicol, his niece (by marriage), daughter of Wilhelmina's sister Mary Wilkie and her husband James S. Nicol, Schoolmaster at Yarrow, Selkirkshire.

In 1851 he married Mary Waddell, eldest daughter of James Waddell and Christina McDonald of Oban, Scotland. The 1861 Scottish Census has him as married to Mary, still residing at the Ednam Schoolhouse, his occupation as Parish Schoolmaster, and birthplace as Biggar, Larnark (which is some 8 miles from Carnwath).

He and Mary Waddell had 8 children, 7 of whom were born at Ednam (being John Gibson Smith born 15 Oct 1852; Christina Macdonald Smith born 2 May 1854; Mary Ann Smith born 7 Feb 1856; Jane Graham Smith born 6 Sep 1857; James Waddell Smith born 23 Jun 1859; David Macrae Smith born 1 Dec 1861; and William Crighton Smith born 2 Jan 1864). A further daughter, Margaret Jamieson Smith, was born in New Zealand on 11 Dec 1866.

He published a work on the manners, customs and amusements of the Scottish Border.

In 1862 he self-published a 240-page book of poetry entitled The Old Churchyard, The Twa Mice and Miscellaneous Poems and Songs in an edition of 1000.

He resigned his post at Ednam school in 1864 and emigrated with his family to New Zealand aboard the ship "Sevilla" which left Glasgow on 21 May 1864 and arrived at Bluff, Southland, New Zealand on 4 September 1864. He was Chairman of a Passengers' Committee that rendered a Testimonial to the Sevilla's Captain. His name is not on the passenger list published by the Southland Times newspaper, although that List appears to only cover "Assisted" Immigrants.

On 28 September 1864, a few weeks after his arrival in New Zealand, he wrote a letter to the Superintendent of the Province of Southland pleading for assistance in finding employment, claiming that "he landed at the Harbour of the Bluff per the Ship Sevilla on the Fourth day of September at which place he expected that, according to promise, he would be renumerated for his services as Chaplain during the voyage, and that certain papers would be delivered to him giving him temporary employment as Land Surveyor – and also the right to draw a sum of money entrusted on the Sixteenth of May last to the Rev. James Smith Minister of Kelso to be transmitted by him through the agency of Messrs Patrick Henderson and Co. of Glasgow. The nonfulfilment of all of these promises has caused very serious inconvenience to him, in so far as it has caused him to be deprived of the means of providing for the requirements of his family on landing, and of expected employment wherewith to maintain them for some time after arriving in the Colony."

He was Master of the Caledonian School at Invercargill, Southland, New Zealand from about 1868 to about 1870.

He later became schoolmaster at Longbush School, Southland, New Zealand. He regularly contributed poetry to local newspapers such as The Southland Times and Otago Witness.

In June 1878 he was appointed the first Secretary and Treasurer of the Southland Education Board.

He died on 18 March 1891 aged 76 and is buried at Eastern Cemetery, Invercargill, with his wife Mary who died in 1901 aged 75.

== The Old Churchyard; The Twa Mice; and Miscellaneous Poems and Songs ==
Printed for John G. Smith in 1862 by R. Stewart, Foot of Horse Market, Kelso.

Contents: THE OLD CHURCHARD - Prelude I; Prelude II; Sacred to the Memory of J----- M-----, who died November 6, 18--, aged 10 years; The Paster's Grave, a Tribute to the Memory of the Rev. J----- T-----; The Wanderer's Grave; In Memory of J----- M----- R-----, who died in 1846, aged 21 years; Anabelle, a Reminisence; The Poet's Grave; The Miser's Grave; A Man's Grave; The Grave of a Dorcas, a Tribute to the Memory of Mrs S----- W-----; In Memory of S----- A-----, One of the Flowers of Early Youth; Conclusion (with additional lines suggested by the sudden death of Thomas Kirkaldy, Esq. at Cliftonhill while the Author was engaged in writing the above lines);

THE TWA MICE; THE SEQUEL;

MISCELLANEOUS POEMS - The Voice of the Sea; The Wee Flower; The Auld Beggar Man – A Sketch; Eden; The Bachelor's Cat; The Reiver Time; The Auld Farm House – A Sketch; An Exile's Lay; The Orphans; Verses on seeing the Statue lately erected to the Ettrick Shepherd at St Mary's Loch; A Mother's Wail; Elleanore; Human Life; Verses Suggested by the Sudden and Lamented Death of Fanny Douglas (a Girl of Great Promise, aged 12 and 1/2); My Rosalie; The Auld Folk at Hame; Wee Patie the Laird – A Sketch; Spring; The Sick Boy (a paraphrastic translation from the German of Adolf Hain); The Cottar's Farewell to his Auld House; Extempore Lines on Hearing Dr Cheever's Address in the Corn Exchange, Kelso, February 18, 1861; Live Them Down; The Land of the Kangaroo – A Valedictory Ballad; Be Gude to Your Mother; April Morn; Verses Written on the Occasion of the Sudden and Lamented Death of Margaret Main, Ednam, aged 13 years; Youth's Address to the Dying Year; Auld Grannie – A Sketch; Oban; The Schoolboy's Lament at the End of the Vacation; The Minstrel's Home; Old Spittal – A Sketch; The Minister's Man – A Sketch; A Night Burial; To Little Fanny; The Wanderer, Dream 1st; The Meeting, Dream 2nd; The Angel, Dream 3rd; The Parting Dream, Dream 4th; Maximum; Verses on the Death of a Lady Whose Title of Nobility was "The Poor Man's Friend"; On a Famous Scandal Monger – A Life Sketch; A Mother's First Grief; To A-----E; For you I Write Not; Wee Mary Ann; To a Young Lady who expressed her strong aversion to Hoary Locks; The Alarm; or R-b-n G—y's Rencontre; Jamie the Sma'; To My Youngest Son; Cowdailly – A Reminisence; Fragment - composed on the Birth Day of the Marquis of Bowmont, 1860; Invocation To Night; Lament for the Death of a Favourite Cat; To My Coz, in Fit of Despondency; Sweet P-bl-s Toon; Lament for the Theft of a Pease Bannock; Impromptu – Addressed to Mr R----- P-----, Slater, Kelso; The Contrast; A New Year's Hymn; Epitaph on a Joiner; Epitaph on an Old Maid – Impromptu; Epigram Written on a Dismally Wet day at Spittal; Lines Addressed to the Author on Reading The Reiver Time – by Mrs A----- S-----, Cape of Good Hope;

SONGS - Oban (Air: The Birks o' Aberfeldy); Yon Bright Twinkling Star (Air: The Araby Maid); Mary Lyle; I Will Love Thee, Dearest Amy; Our Ain Folk (Air: Scots Wha Ha'e); Willie Is Gane (Air: My Nannie's Awa); Our Toon End (Air: There Grows A Bonny Brier Bush); Now Nae Mair The Zephers Blaw (Air: Gloomy Winter); The Labourer's Fireside Song (Air: There's Nae Luck About The House); Song - Donald (Air: Gillie Callum); Donald's Reply; My Hieland Lassie; Sawyer Rob (Tune: Heather Jock); Up An' Rin Awa', Patie; Song – Haste an' Come Awa, Maggie; Donald McRaw; Song – My Lassie; Bonnie Lassie, Guileless Lassie; Singin' Tam (Air: Heather Jock); The Muster Roll of the Meeting of Schoolmasters held at Newtown, March 17, 1860; The Hermitte – Ane Auncient Ballade; Farewell.
