= George Valentine (poet) =

George Donald Valentine (1877–1946) was a Scottish sheriff, and writer of romantic-style short stories, plays and verse. He graduated from the University of Glasgow and was considered for Examinerships in Mathematics and Natural Philosophy at both Glasgow and St Andrews Universities.

== Works ==
G. D. Valentine wrote both under his own name and the pseudonym, George Henderland.

Valentine's first published work was The Heart of Bruce, a long poem, taken up by Alexander Gardner of Paisley in 1912. In the 1920s, two further original works, Reasons of State and Saul: A Dramatic Poem appeared under the same imprint. It was the publication in 1929 of Dawn by London-based publishers Elkin Mathews & Marrot that first brought his works to the attention of a national audience.

=== Dawn ===
Dawn is a work of verse inspired by fragments from the works of the Greek Greek lyric poets Archilochus, Alcman, Alcaeus and Sappho. It was published under the pseudonym, George Henderland, as was his last published work, Olaf's Son: A Poem.

Both longing after youthful love ("baby Love" p. 21) and nature's bounty are key themes in Dawn, as well as a desire for the pre-civilisational:

"Take me out of the city's shadow
Where I fade and cease to be!" (p. 50)

== Unpublished works ==
From the manuscript collection of Valentine's works at Glasgow University, we know of at least Letter from the Wilderness: An Epic Poem (1926), Reclaimed: A Comedy in Three Acts (1928), Poems, May–June 1946, and the undated Moses: A Drama in the Manner of Ueschylus, in two scenes, and Kings of the Sea.
