= John Younger (writer) =

Scottish writer, shoemaker, and angler (1785–1860)

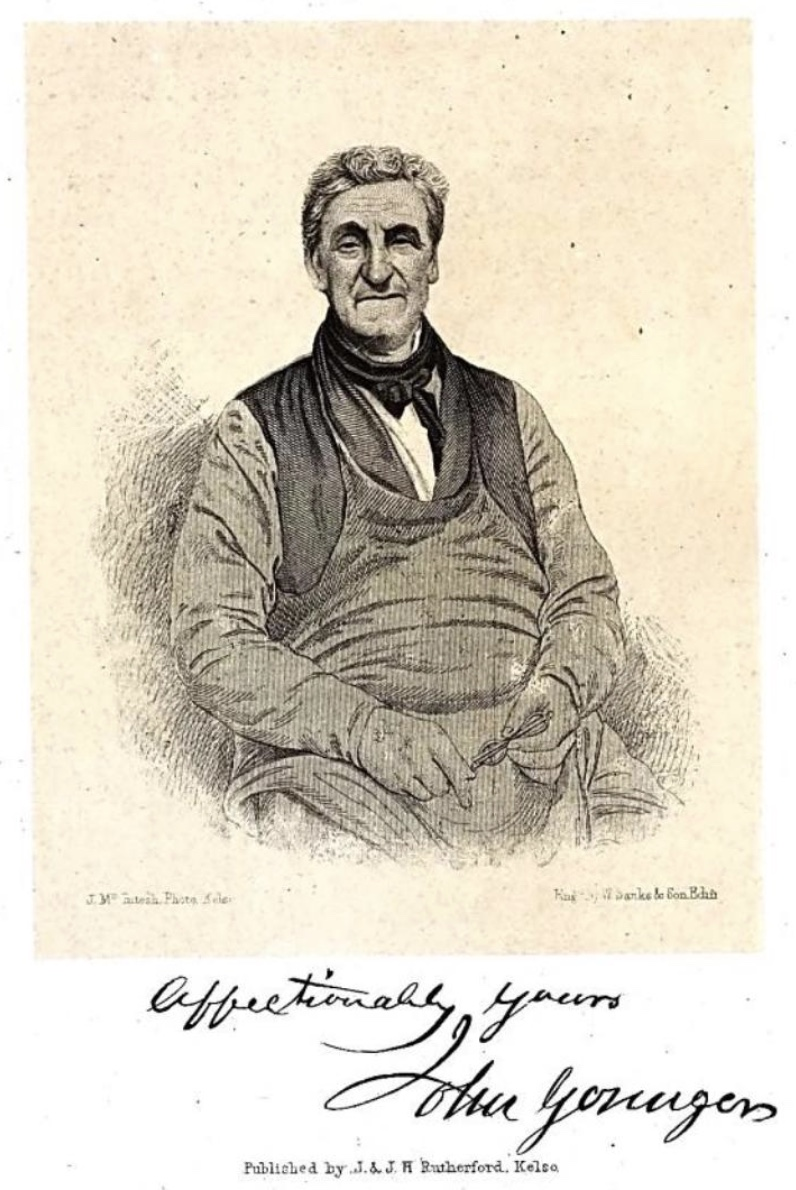
- portrait of John Younger of St Boswells, Scotland (1785-1860)
- Born: July 5, 1785
- Died: June 18, 1860 (aged 74); St Boswells, Scotland
- Occupations: writer, shoemaker, angler
- Years active: 1834-1860
- Known for: poetry, autobiography, fly-fishing, shoemaking
- Notable work: Autobiography of John Younger (1881, posthumous); Thoughts As They Rise (1834); River Angling for Salmon and Trout (1839); The Light of the Week (prize essay on the sabbath); Corn Law Rhymes

John Younger (5 July 1785 – 18 June 1860), of St. Boswells, was a Scottish writer on angling, a shoemaker, and a poet.

== Early life ==
The Dictionary of National Biography 1885-1900 entry on Younger said the following of his childhood: "Younger, the youngest of the six children of William Younger, a Border shoemaker, by his wife, Jean Henderson. He was born at Longnewton in the parish of Ancrum, Roxburghshire, on 5 July 1785. His grandfather, John Younger, had put by £900 as a gardener in England, but lost it all by an unlucky speculation. He himself was put to the last when barely nine. The countryside was a poor one, even before the black famine of the closing years of the eighteenth century, and while the quartern loaf stood at 2s. John had some sharp straits to live through, the details of which are in his Autobiography."

== Career ==
The Dictionary of National Biography 1885-1900 entry on Younger said the following of his career: "He soon surpassed any poacher of the day in his knowledge of fur and feather, but, above all, he became an unrivalled angler. When things began to mend he married (9 August 1811) Agnes Riddle, and settled at St. Boswells, some three miles from Longnewton, as the village shoemaker. Having bought a copy of Burns for sixpence at St. Boswells fair, John began to feel that he too was a poet, but it was not until 1834 that he published a little volume (in the metre of 'Don Juan'), entitled 'Thoughts as they Rise' (Glasgow, 12mo). The title is a good one, suggesting, as it does, the lack of metrical finish conspicuous in work by no means devoid of inspiration.

"After 'sweethearting' and love lyrics, he held the next best thing in the world to be fly-fishing, and he turned his intimate knowledge of this last subject to good account when he dated from St. Boswells Green in September 1839 his 'River Angling for Salmon and Trout, more particularly as practised in the Tweed and its Tributaries' (Edinburgh, 1840, 16mo, two editions; revised, Kelso, 1860, 16mo, and 1864, 8vo; it was highly praised in the 'Field' for its 'practical' value). He was as keen an observer of men as of fish, and he became courted alike as the most proficient Scots angler and as the 'Tweedside Gnostic.' He laughed at the chartist movement as chimerical, but poverty was to him almost a religion; he both hated and despised the rich, nor was he at any pains to conceal his views. Of a duke to whom it was once suggested he might appeal, he said roughly, 'We have no natural sympathies, save eating, that is, when a poor man has to eat.'

"His perception of lyrical poetry and natural beauty was exquisite, but he had a disgust, partly envious, for 'the classics,' and he looked on the Waverley Novels as 'old piper stories,' ‘dwarf and witch tales,' and monstrous caricatures of Scottish manners. The 'baronial hall' was his abhorrence. In 1847, being then sixty-two, he won a prize for an essay on 'The Temporal Advantage of the Sabbath ... in relation to the Working Classes' (published as 'The Light of the Week,' London, 1849, 12mo, 1851 and 1853, 8vo), an admirable example of the sententious essay, lit up by vivid illustrations such as a practised speaker or preacher might envy.

"He went up to London to receive his prize of £15 at the hands of the Earl of Shaftesbury, and on his return was banqueted by the neighbourhood, in which he was extremely popular. About 1849 he was appointed village postmaster, but the routine work proved beyond his patience, and in January 1856 he threw up the post and returned to cobbling. He died very poor, but honest and industrious to the last, on 18 June 1860, and was buried beside his 'Nannie' (often celebrated in his writings; she died in 1856) in St. Boswells kirkyard. He left some rich materials for a 'memoir' of himself, to which he had given the title 'Obscurities in Private Life developed; or Robinson Crusoe untravelled.' These were recast into an 'Autobiography of John Younger,' and published at Kelso in 1881. His best thoughts are contained in this and in two bulky volumes of correspondence which remain unpublished. Good engraved portraits of Younger are prefixed both to the 'Autobiography' and to 'River Angling.’"
