= Roderick Watson =

Scottish poet and professor

Roderick Watson (born 1943) is a Scottish poet. He is a professor emeritus in English Studies at the University of Stirling.

== Life ==
Watson was born on 12th May 1943 in Aberdeen. He was educated at Aberdeen Grammar School and Aberdeen University before doing postgraduate study at Peterhouse, Cambridge, where his doctoral thesis was on the poetry of Hugh MacDiarmid. He was later to write a critical study of MacDiarmid, whom he met and befriended as a student. Watson later taught at the University of Victoria in Canada, before coming back to Scotland and joining the University of Stirling.

He has written and lectured widely on Scottish literature and cultural identity, and served as General Editor of the Canongate Classics reprint series since the start of the project in 1987. He is a Fellow of the Royal Society of Edinburgh and was co-editor (with Linda Dryden) of The Journal of Stevenson Studies 2006-2916.

He has published three main volumes of verse over the years, and has featured in numerous periodicals and anthologies. After an early pamphlet he published his debut work True History on the Walls in 1976, and this was followed by the Luath Press publication Into the Blue Wavelengths in 2004. Upon its publication it was lauded by Philip Hobsbaum, who labelled Watson as a "poet of introspection and retrospection". The Silver of Old Mirrors followed in 2025.

== Notes ==
- Watson, R (1985) MacDiarmid (The Open University Press)
- Watson, R (1984; 2nd ed. in 2 vols 2007) The Literature of Scotland (Macmillan)
- Watson, R (1989) The Poetry of Norman MacCaig (Association for Scottish Literary Studies)
- Watson, R (1996) The Poetry of Scotland (Edinburgh University Press)
- Watson R and D Goldie eds.(2014) From the Line: Scottish War Poetry 1914-1945 (Association for Scottish Literary Studies)
- Watson, R with D Goldie, Scottish War Poetry 1914-1945 (Association for Scottish Literary Studies)
- Watson, R (1964) 28 Poems with James Rankin (Aberdeen)
- Watson, R (1970) Roderick Watson, (Parklands Poets, Preston)
- Watson, R (1971) Trio, with Val Simmons and Paul Mills, (New Rivers Press, New York)
- Watson, R (1976) True History on the Walls (Macdonald, Edinburgh)
- Watson, R, and Martin Gray (1978) The Penguin Book of the Bicycle (Allen Lane, London)
- Watson, R (2004) Into the Blue Wavelengths (Luath Press, Edinburgh)
- Watson, R (2025) The Silver of Old Mirrors (The Voyage Out Press, Dundee)
