= Elizabeth Bentley (disambiguation) =

Elizabeth Bentley (1908–1963) was an American spy.

Elizabeth Bentley may also refer to:

- Elizabeth Bentley (writer) (1767–1839), British poet
- Elizabeth Bentley OES Scholarship Fund, started in 1947 by the Order of the Eastern Star
