= The Muse's Tragedy =

1899 short story by Edith Wharton

"The Muse’s Tragedy" is a short-story written by Edith Wharton. Published in 1899 by Charles Scribner’s Sons (25th magazine), The Muse’s Tragedy was then printed in June 1899, as part of the collection of short fiction The Greater Inclination.

The story focuses on the platonic love story between Danyers, the main character and aspiring scholar, and Mary Anerton. The first two parts of the short story reveal their meeting and the link that unites them: Mrs. Anerton was the muse of poet Victor Rendle that Danyers admired very much. They go together to Italy, to the Villa d’Este, where Danyers falls in love with Anerton the muse.

The third part is a letter, written by Mrs. Anerton, explaining her life as Rendle’s muse and her love for the poet. However, her love was never requited and she became a « disappointed woman ». Because of that, she cannot live with Danyers nor let him love her. Having been considered solely as a muse by Rendle and never as a woman, Mrs. Anerton finds herself in a tragic situation.

The short story addresses the themes of love, tragedy and artistic inspiration through Danyers’ point of view. Its title alludes to The Tragic Muse, a novel by Henry James.

== Biography ==
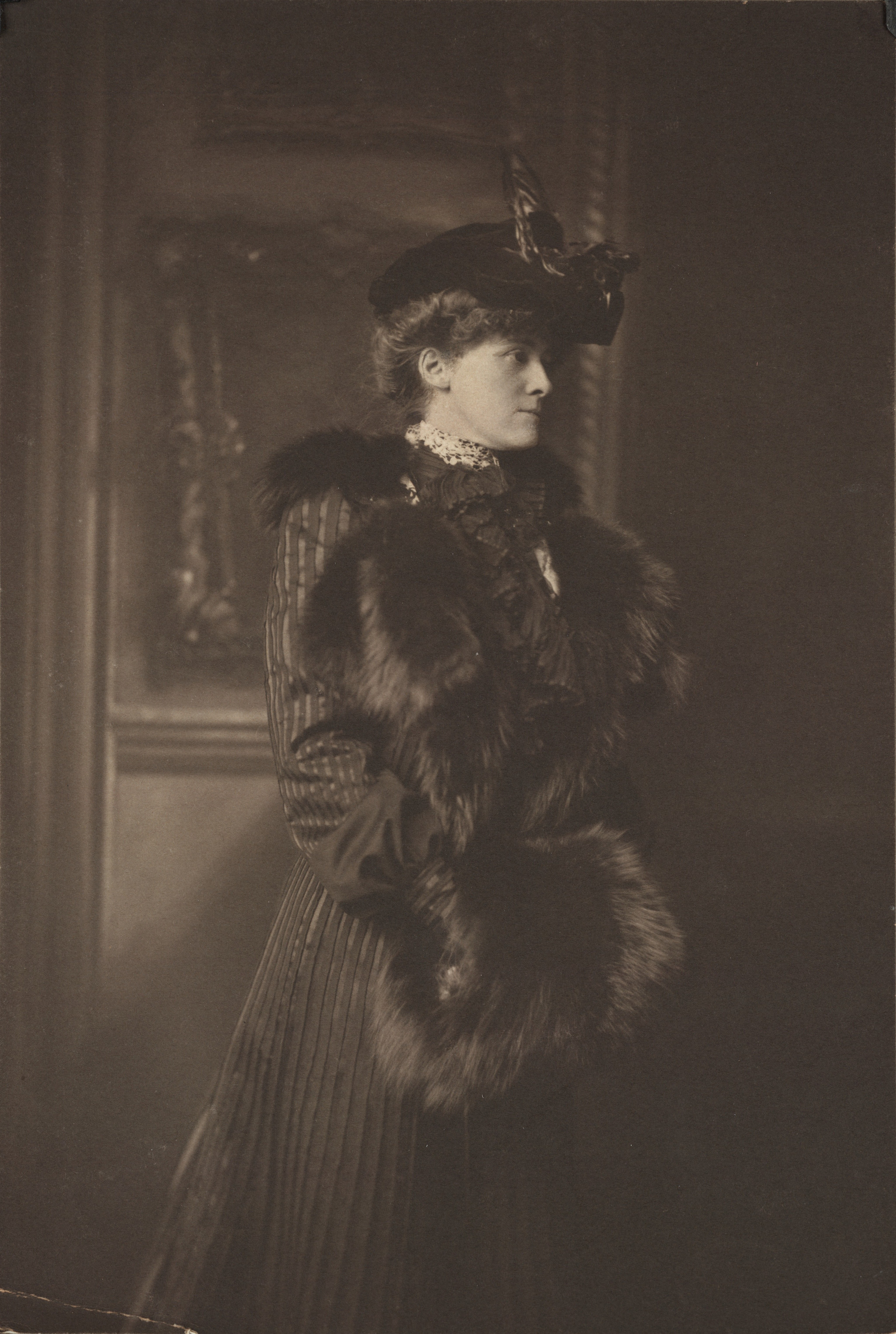
Edith Wharton, the writer of The Muse's Tragedy

Edith Wharton (Newbold Jones) was born on the 24 January 1862 in New York. She was the third child of Georges Frederic and Lucretia Jones (a rich family - her mother was an aristocrat). During her childhood, Edith was a brilliant girl and as a teenager she began to write a short story called "Fast and Loose". Cultivated and keen on the world surrounding her, she will become close friend with Walter Berry, an expert in French literature.

Later, she married Edward Robbins (in 1885) and she travelled in Europe, particularly to Paris. Her success bothered her husband which made the couple unhappy; as a consequence, and because of Edward's instability, they broke up in 1911.

The year 1887 was very important to her because she wrote her first major book: The decoration of House. Her creativity can be seen through the house she designed and built named The Mount (in 1901). This house had inspired her, for example she wrote The House of Mirth in 1911.

As a lover of the French culture, she decided to settle in Paris in 1907. There, she rubbed shoulders with the great and the good of the French society: André Gide, Jean Cocteau, and Paul Bourget. During the World War I, she did not put her career aside: indeed, Edith Wharton founded the American Hostels for Refugees, collected donations and visited the front hospitals, as she wrote the account of her visits in Fighting France: from Dunkerque to Belfort.

The success of Wharton’s career reached its peak in 1921, with the publication of The Age of Innocence, allowing her to win the Pulitzer Prize, and becoming the first woman to receive it. The same year, her dearest friend Walter Berry died, plunging her into a deep sorrow. As a tribute, she started writing The Children, which can be considered as her major best-seller.

After a first heart attack in 1935, Edith Wharton was transported to Pavillon Colombes two years later, where she died in August the 11th.

She is buried in the cemetery of Versailles alongside Walter Berry.

== Summary ==
At the beginning of the short-story, the protagonist Danyers sees a woman and admits he would have liked to recognize Mrs. Anerton in her. He then goes back to the beginning of his connection with Anerton, fostered through Rendle’s poetry which celebrated Sylvia, who is commonly thought to have been Mrs. Anerton. He meets the real Mary Anerton after an acquaintance of his, Mrs. Memorall, tells him about her.

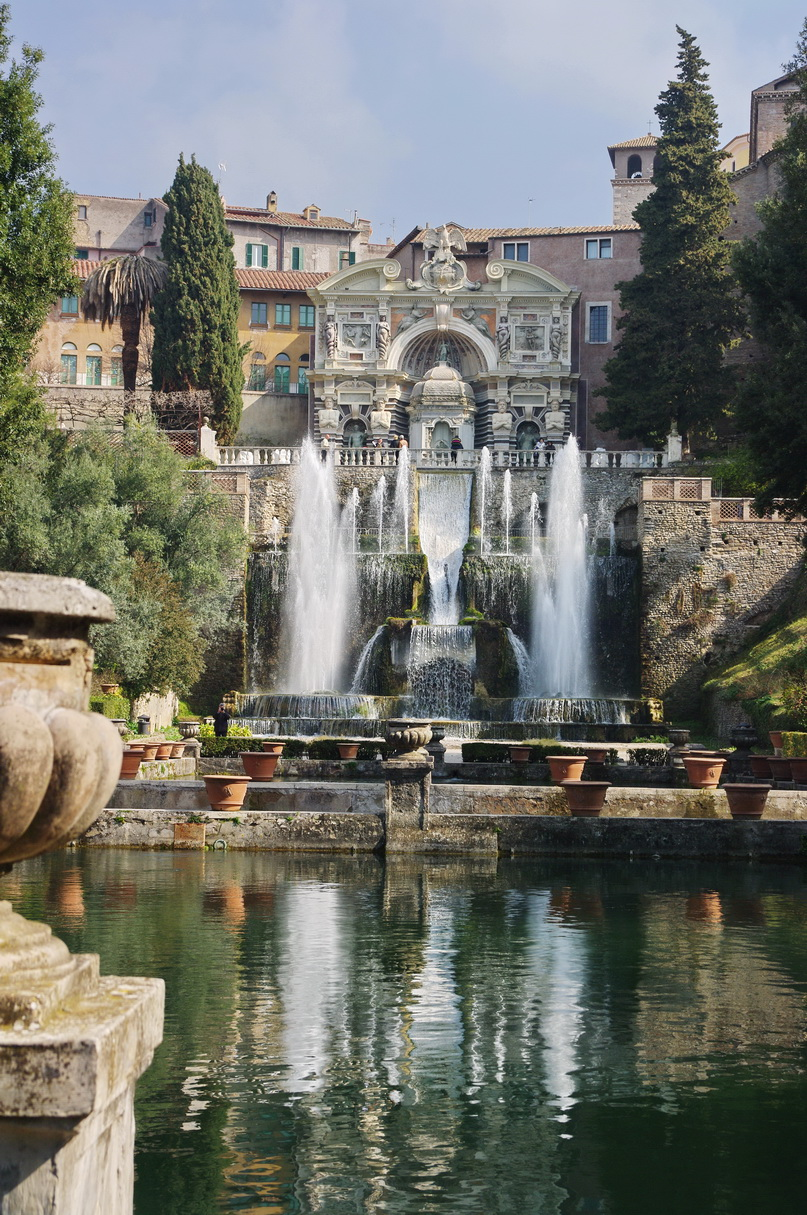
Villa d'Este, where the story took place

The importance of poetry is revealed in Danyers' growth, in an analepsis, that brings the reader to Danyers’ days in Harvard. Mrs. Anerton is seen as the muse of the poet, Rendle, and she is associated with his work. Mrs. Memorall told him that Mrs. Anerton had stepped out of social life after the death of her husband. When Mrs. Memorall passes his work on to Mrs. Anerton, the first step of what is going to be a new relationship is made.

As they spend several weeks together at the Villa d’Este, Danyers and Mrs. Anerton get to know one another better especially by talking about Rendle and his poems. Danyers learns about details of his poetry. Retrospectively, Danyers understands that Mrs. Anerton tries to recover the same influence that she had on Rendle’s mind. The sentence: "Mrs. Anerton’s mind was like some fertile garden wherein, inevitably, Rendle’s imagination had rooted itself and flowered", shows that Mrs. Anerton had a personality and a creativity of her own, that she was not a passive muse.

Their relationship grows increasingly stronger in a romantic environment, and Mrs. Anerton encourages Danyers to contemplate writing a book about Rendle for which she promises her help. Mrs. Anerton stays a muse: as she had inspired Rendle’s poetry, she becomes Danyers’ inspiration. We could notice the revival the same scheme: she inspired Rendle : "Silvia had herself created the Sonnets to Silvia".

The third part begins with a letter that ends the short-story. It informs the reader of an ellipsis: Danyers and Mrs. Anerton have spent a month together in Venice, but have not discussed the book project. Through this letter – which expresses a break-up as well as a confession – Mrs. Anerton expresses to Danyers her inability to love him. She wrote about her memories of Rendle and the illusion she had to live with for many years, expecting him to love her as she did, for she was her Muse. But Silvia and Mrs. Anerton were made to share the same body. She forgot she was a Muse thanks to Rendle and she began to love Danyers until Danyers was jealous because of her past with Rendle. She discovered her power of seduction. She wants to use it, and as a result, she decides to leave him so that he does not suffer as she had suffered: she can only love Rendle, and thus is unable to respond to Danyers regardless of how much she wants to. In Danyers, she found someone that loves her for who she is, not what she is. Thus, she likes him and offers him the whole story as a final present.

== Themes ==
=== Tragedy ===
As the reader figures it out from the very beginning of the short story thanks to the title, The Muse's Tragedy's plot relies on some tragic aspects.

First of all, the tragic dimension of the text is personified in the character of Mrs. Anerton. Apart from being a victim of time, left alone by her husband and friends, she enhances her personal tragedy with her paradoxical wish to be lonely yet surrounded by friends. Her life has been spoiled by the one-sided love she felt for Rendle. The tragic aspect of her unrequited love is taken a step further with her refusal of being loved by another man. Indeed, she tells Danyers: “It is because Vincent Rendle didn’t love me that there is no hope for you. I never had what I wanted, and never, never, will I stoop to wanting anything else.” In this way, aspects of tragedy exceed the main character of Mrs. Anerton. The young Danyers is thus touched by the overwhelming tragic atmosphere of The Muse's Tragedy.

The narrator, by depicting Mrs. Anerton's life, enhances at the same time the tragedy of Danyers in his love failure towards Mrs. Anerton. Rendle, however dead he may be, still is the main reason of Mrs. Anerton and Danyers' misfortune. Both Danyers and Mrs. Anerton are impacted by the pathetic relationship between the poet and his muse. Beyond her tragic story, she becomes a path for tragedy as she carries Danyers along, and thus hurts the world around her.

To conclude, tragic aspects of The Muse's Tragedy rely on Mrs. Anerton’s unsuccessful love towards Rendle. This event, this detail causes suffering, destruction and distress, which are the consequence of conventional tragedies.

=== Love ===
The theme of love is a significant leitmotiv in the short-story. In fact, Mrs. Anerton is first depicted as Rendle’s lover, and the whole story is about Danyers and Mrs. Anerton’s love.

To begin with, the love between Rendle and Mrs. Anerton was fictitious. Actually, a few clues foreshadow the unrequited love: the whole story is set in a poetic style and fraught with references to Rendle’s poem. The rhythm of the short-story is underlined by the romantic atmosphere: at the Villa d’Este, the scene takes place in the woods: it seems like a typical amorous scene. Therefore, we can interpret this writing style - that underlines the poetic aspect of the story - as a sign of the muse’s and the poet’s love. It may foreshadow the tragic one-sided passion.

Then, the love story between Danyers and Mrs. Anerton is also quite particular: the former is a reader of Rendle’s work. Therefore, Danyers falls in love with this woman who is not only an inspiration but is also inspired enough to help a writer and give him more creativity. Thus, their love story seems possible. The story evokes their stay in Venice, where their love keeps growing, but the passage is eluded from the text. The Muse seems to be delivered from a one-sided love curse. But surprisingly, despite their love for each other, Mrs. Anerton refuses to marry him and announces her decision in a letter. The fact that Edith Wharton concludes her short-story with a written confession makes her choice even stronger and tragic since the emotions of Mrs. Anerton are clearly exposed for the first time in the story.

To conclude, their relationship has been built awkwardly throughout the short-story, leading to a relationship that cannot move forward. Mrs. Anerton appears to be cursed, stuck in the same scheme forever: to love but not to be able to be something else than a muse for the lover. The muse’s fate is still chasing her over and over: this is the muse’s tragedy.

=== Inspiration ===
In her short story, The Muse's Tragedy, Edith Wharton presents not only the story of the tragic relationship between Danyers and Mrs. Anerton, but also, in the background, the poetic work above language. Different feelings are at the root of inspiration: love, curiosity and intellectual agreement. The title of the short-story is a reference to artistic inspiration.

The artist is inspired by a specific woman, called his “muse”. The narrator offers to the reader a biased picture of Mrs. Anerton, indeed, she is seen as a goddess, because of the inspiration she arose in her poet Rendle, and in other men. The sentence “ […] on the altar of her insatiable divinity” shows that. There is the lexical field of the divinity “altar” “divinity” “veneration” “sanctuary”. She allows the creation. “Silvia had herself created the Sonnets to Silvia”; she is like a demiurge, a divinity; she spreads an aura that arouses the inspiration.

By being abstract, this notion of inspiration needs concrete images to be stated and that is why the narrator uses numerous comparisons. Above all, we can quote two comparisons between inspiration and other concrete elements.

First of all, inspiration is presented through the muse, Mrs. Anerton, like a garden: "Mrs. Anerton's mind was like some fertile garden wherein inevitably, Rendle's imagination had rooted and flowered". This sentence compares Rendle's imagination to a plant that is in need of nutrients, that is to say of inspiration. This vegetable comparison highlights the merging and vital relationship between the poet and his inspiration. The use of the different tenses can be pointed out: the narrator uses the preterit in order to relate Mrs. Anerton's state, it's a passive attitude. On the contrary, Rendle's action is depicted with the past perfect that points up his active attitude: the poet seems to be the main participant.

Secondly, we can note this sentence: "my mind must have been to him (I fancy) like some perfectly tuned instrument on which he was never tired of playing". This comparison draws closer poetry and a second art, music, and it throws light on the musical and melodic aspect of poetry. The union between Mrs. Anerton and Rendle is almost not human but perfect, but also the syntactic place of the two characters in the sentence that seem to underline their roles: Mrs Anerton, being a muse and so a source of inspiration, is always at the beginning because inspiration arrives before the work of the poet, and Rendle is at the end of the sentence or just after Mrs. Anerton's name because he acts after the birth of inspiration, his action is posterior to Anerton's.

In this text, the role of the muse progresses and widens. The common opinion is confronted with Danyers' that changed in the course of the story. Indeed, at the end, the role of the muse is not passive anymore but Danyers claims that “Silvia had herself created the Sonnet to Silvia." Hence, the perception of the role of the muses in inspiration and artistic creation progresses until pointing out the major part that Mrs. Anerton played in Rendle's poetry. The narrator creates a link from inspiration to creation.
