= John Stagg =

John Stagg may refer to:

- SS John Stagg, a tanker-type Liberty ship, named after John Stagg (1864–1915), president of Alabama Presbyterian College for Men
- John Stagg (poet) (1770–1823), English poet
