= Isabel Pagan =

Scottish poet

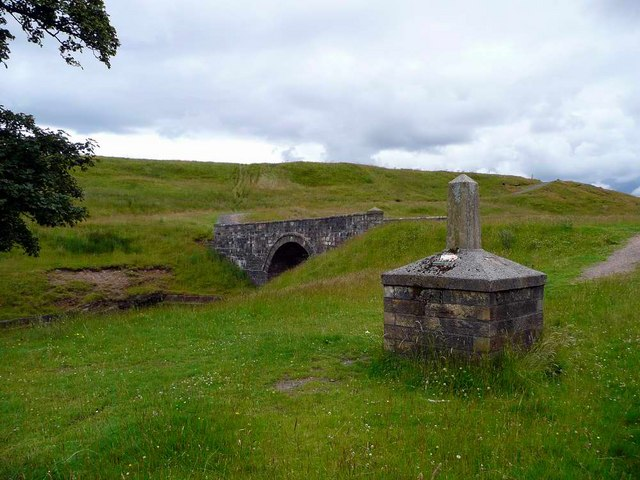
Tibbie's Brig and memorial near Smallburn, East Ayrshire

Isabel Pagan (c. 1740 – 1821), also known as "Tibbie", was a Scottish poet of the Romantic Era.

== Biography ==
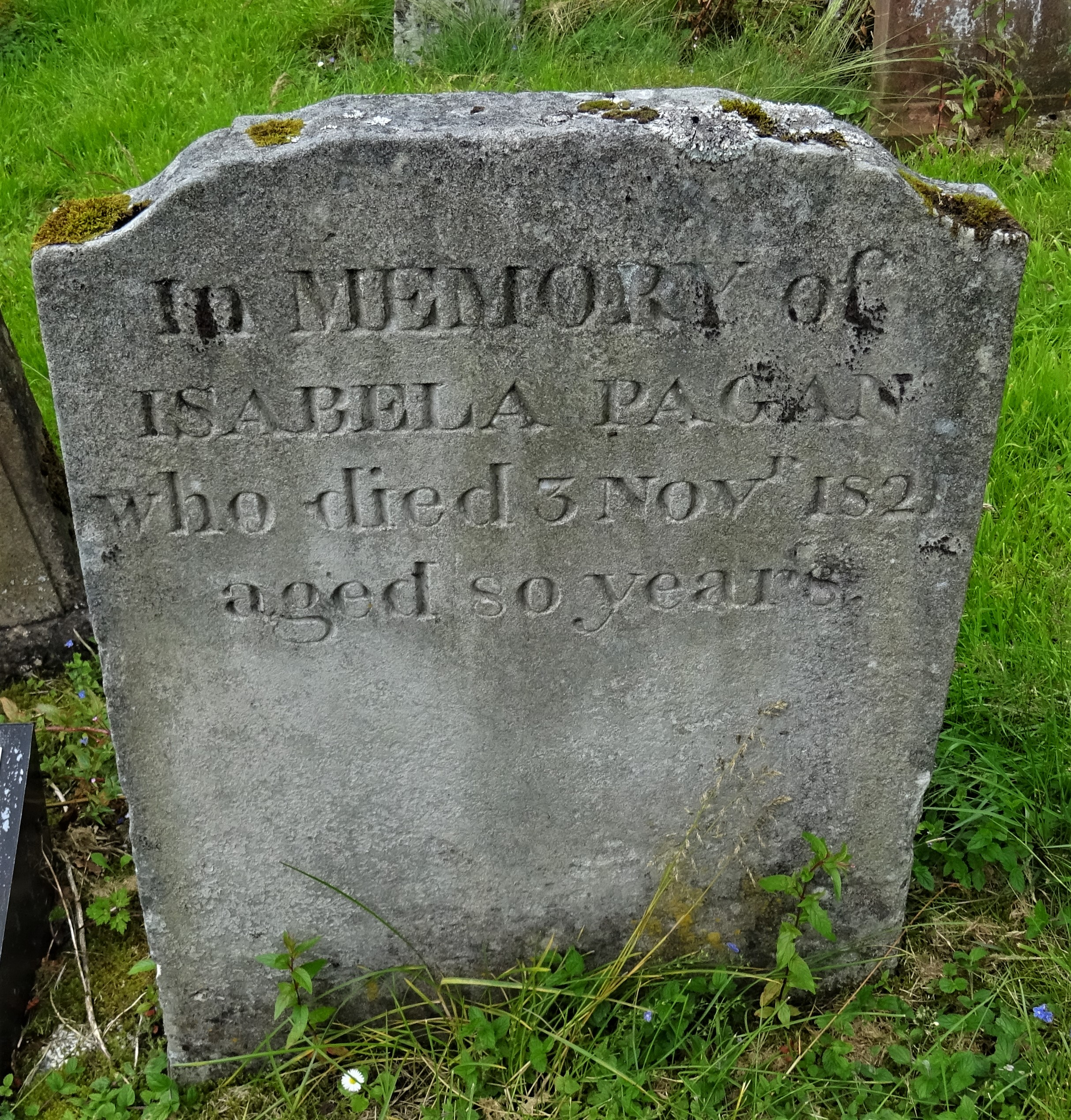
Isobel Pagan's gravestone in Muirkirk graveyard

Pagan was born in 1741, about 4 miles from Nith-head in the Parish of New Cumnock, where she lived until 14 years of age. Lame from birth with a deformed foot, she also had a squint and a large tumour on her side. Unsuited for hard labour she settled in a cottage now romantically situated on the banks of the Garpel water, where she made a living by writing verses, singing and opening her cottage as a howff – a meeting place and an unofficial pub where whisky and strong drink was served in a convivial atmosphere. She was in the habit of satirizing in verse those who had offended her. She was noted for her sarcastic wit and was apparently an exceptional singer, often singing her own compositions to the delight of her rustic audience. During the shooting season her howff would be filled with aristocrats who were glad to enjoy a laugh at her humour and to hear her sing. Although never married she had a child by a man called Campbell who deserted her, on the eve of their marriage. She was unable to write; the local tailor Gemmell wrote out her verses. Known as Tibbie to her friends she died at the end of 1821 in her 80th year and was buried in the cemetery at Muirkirk. She has been titled Working class poet, as has Christian Milne.

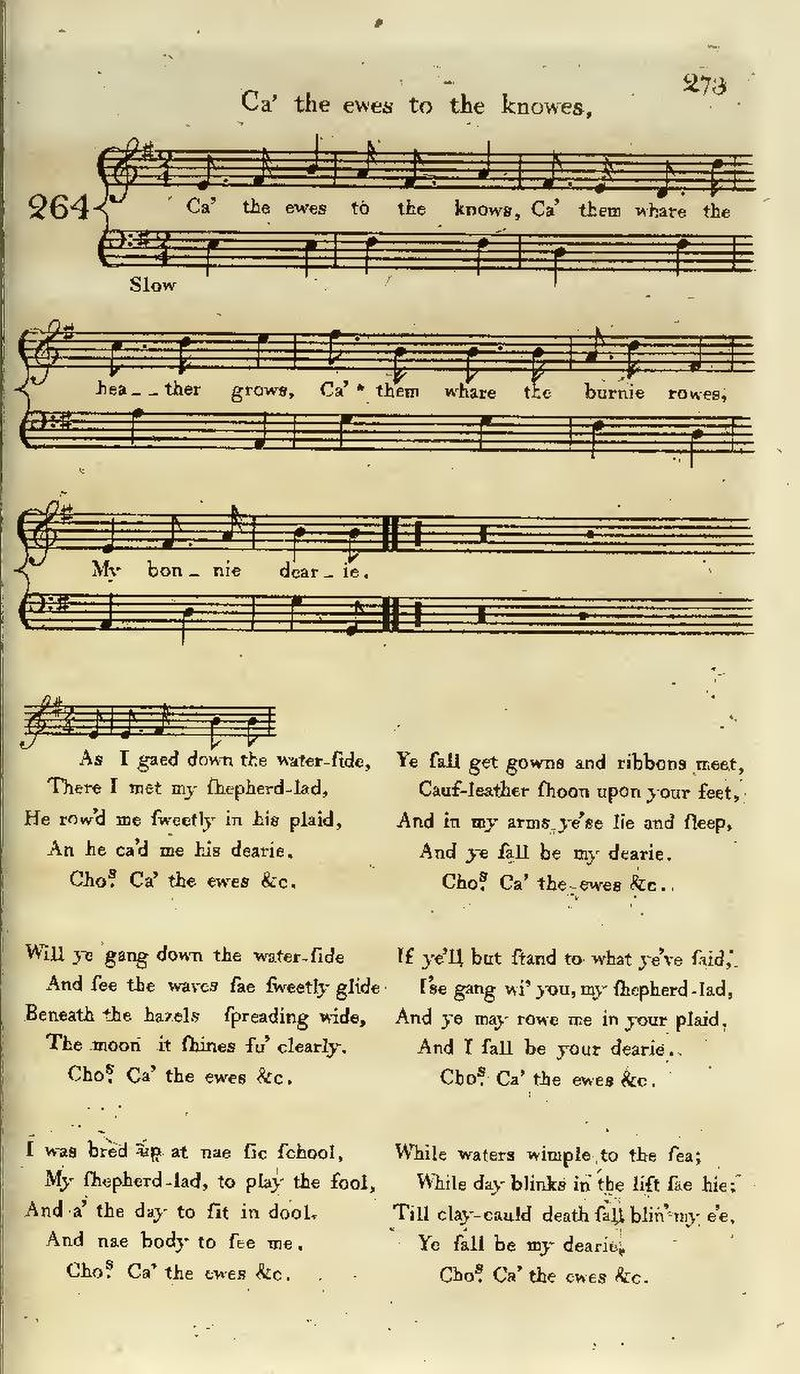
Ca' the Yowes

Her best known work, "Ca' the Ewes to the Knowes" was adapted and popularised as a Scottish folk song by the poet Robert Burns.

== Works ==
Her one published volume of poems was A Collection of Songs and Poems on Several Occasions published by Niven, Napier, and Khull in Glasgow in 1803. Some of her poetry includes:

- Ca' the Ewes to the Knowes
- The Crook and Plaid
- Account of the Author's Lifetime
- A New Love Song, with the Answer
- The Answer
- On Burns and Ramsay
- A Letter
- The Spinning Wheel
- A Love Letter
- Muirkirk Light Weights
