= Robert Anderson (poet) =

English poet (1770–1833)

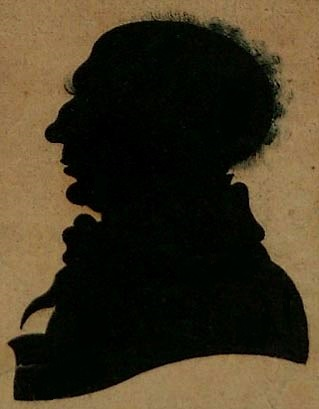
A silhouette of the poet from the 1820s (Tullie House Museum, Carlisle)

Robert Anderson (1770–1833), was an English labouring class poet from Carlisle. He was best known for his ballad-style poems in Cumbrian dialect.

== Life ==
Robert Anderson was born on 1 February 1770, the youngest child of nine when his parents were already old. He received his education in various places, including a charity school attached to the cathedral and then under different masters, although he was with none for very long. Having mastered the basics of reading, writing and arithmetic, he was sent to work to help support his family at the age of ten, initially under an elder brother who was a calico printer.

Having some artistic ability, he was apprenticed in 1783 to a pattern drawer and eventually went to London for five years for further training. While there he started writing - "Lucy Gray of Allendale" being the first of his compositions. This and others written that year were set to music by the composer James Hook and performed to some applause in 1794. In 1796 he returned to support his father in Carlisle and found work with a firm there. Two years later his English Poems on Various Subjects were published by subscription. Afterwards he turned to lighthearted humorous poems in dialect and the first edition of Ballads in the Cumbrian dialect was published in Carlisle in 1805. Since music was a favourite diversion of his, he composed the music to accompany many of these himself.

In 1808, following the death of his father the year before, Anderson left for another position near Belfast, calling on the way to visit the grave of one of his principal influences, Robert Burns. While there he published in the local papers and particularly a series of four "Enigmas" in the Belfast Commercial Chronicle which sparked a brief fad of imitation. Eventually he had to return to England, since the calico trade was in decline, and was welcomed back to Carlisle with a civic reception. To help relieve his poverty, a new edition of his poems, The Poetical Works of Robert Anderson, was published from the city in 1820, for which he contributed an autobiographical essay. This edition attracted over 1000 subscribers, among them the then poet laureate, Robert Southey, and his eventual successor, William Wordsworth.

Anderson's last years were marked by intemperance and the fear of ending his days in the workhouse. But, though he died very poor, he was saved from that fate by the financial support of friends. After his death, he was buried in the grounds of Carlisle Cathedral, and a memorial was raised there with a medallion likeness and the inscription "Erected by public subscription to the memory of Robert Anderson, the Cumberland Bard, died in Carlisle, 26 Sept. 1833, aged 63 years". The centenary edition of Anderson’s Cumberland Ballads and Songs was published in 1904. His death was marked by a centenary celebration souvenir, Robert Anderson, the Cumberland Bard, in 1933.

Two late silhouette portraits of the poet are now in the Tullie House Museum and Art Gallery, as is his death mask. There is also a head and shoulders portrait of the poet attributed to John Hazlitt in which he is wearing the same neatly knotted neckcloth as in the silhouettes.

== Poetry in Cumberland dialect ==
Although Anderson was largely responsible for the contemporary popularisation of English dialect poetry, his 1805 Ballads were far from the first. His work had been preceded the year before by the Miscellaneous Poems of John Stagg. In consequence of their championship of the region, Stagg was to be called ‘The Cumbrian Minstrel’ and Anderson ‘The Cumberland Bard’. But they were only following in the footsteps of the 18th century ‘Cumberland Muse’, Susanna Blamire. A member of the gentry, she had written songs in Scots that were set to music by Joseph Haydn. Her work in Cumbrian dialect was less well known until the vogue established by Anderson.

There had been other well educated precursors in the 18th century who had already used dialect in their poetry. One of the earliest was the Rev. Josiah Relph, whose imitations of Theocritan Pastorals self-consciously introduce the demotic for local colour. Although written about 1735, they were not published until after the author's death in A Miscellany of Poems (Wigton, 1747). The Rev. Robert Nelson followed him in the same tradition with A choice collection of poems in Cumberland dialect (Sunderland, 1780). Ewan Clark, a contemporary of Nelson's, also wrote a handful of dialect imitations that were included in his Miscellaneous Poems (Whitehaven 1779).

The year of the publication of Ballads in the Cumbrian dialect (1805) also saw a third edition of Relph's poems. Earlier there had been a 1797 edition, a copy of which Anderson had sent to a female friend accompanied by a verse epistle. The work of these earlier writers was to be incorporated with poems by some of Anderson's contemporaries in anthologies that followed the popular reprints of his ballads, always stressing their Cumbrian affiliation. One such collection was Ballads in the Cumberland dialect, chiefly by R. Anderson (1808, second edition 1815, Wigton), which included poems by Miss Blamire and other anonymous female writers, Ewan Clark and Mark Lonsdale, as well as woodcuts in the style - or from the workshop - of Thomas Bewick. The influence of the earlier pastoral style is manifest in the many dialogue poems there, including Anderson's own work. A more ambitious anthology of dialect verse, Dialogues, poems, songs, and ballads, by various writers, in the Westmoreland and Cumberland dialects, followed from London in 1839.

== Anderson's verse ==
Anderson's work in standard English went on to include long narratives, which were added to his lyrics and occasional poems. These were collected together with his dialect poems in the 1820 Poetical Works, but there was still much of his that remained unpublished among his manuscripts. After his death a good proportion, some 130 pieces, including extra verses and other changes by its own account, were added to Anderson’s Cumberland Ballads, published from Wigton in 1840. Even so, this was limited to his dialect writing. His opera, "The Chief of Skye", was never published and remained unknown apart from some biographical mentions.

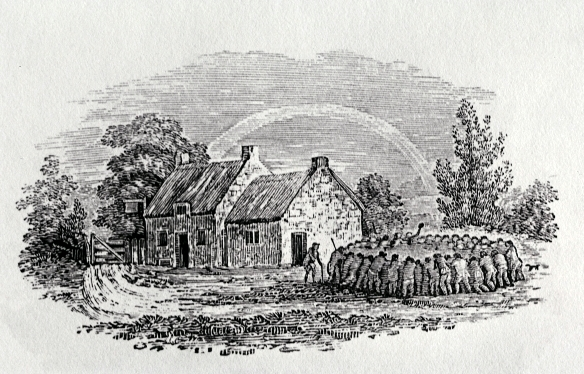
A woodcut of a cockfight outside a country inn engraved attributed to Thomas Bewick in 1805

Mark Huggins has commented on Anderson that he "was a man of the people, and most of his songs were about real individuals, whose names appear in parish registers of the time." He celebrated the area's small towns, farms, fairs, markets and landscape, addressing the life of the inhabitants: their work, loves, feasting, drinking, dancing and cockfights. His ballads are full of human interest and playful humour, with an eye to the ridiculous that does not demean his subjects. A handful of these ballads were to enter the oral tradition and be collected by folk song enthusiasts in the early 20th century. Four in particular are still recognised as classics: "Barbary Bell", "Sally Gray", "The Blackwell Merry Night", and "Canny Cumberland. As commonly happens with oral material, their text changed as the original authorship was forgotten. The most radical example of this occurred in the later history of "Jenny’s Complaint". Adapted to the mining circumstances of southern Cumbria, it lived a life of its own, divorced from the tune Anderson wrote for it, as "The Recruited Collier".

Anderson's earliest poem, "Lucy Gray of Allendale", provides a somewhat similar example of transforming influence in the literary sphere. There is some confusion here, since one of the ‘Lucy poems’ written by William Wordsworth during his 1799-1800 tour of Germany actually is titled "Lucy Gray". It was, by his account, based on the story of a Halifax girl who lost her way in the snow, although a claim has also been made that he may have been remembering Christopher Anstey’s ballad, "The Farmer’s Daughter". The story of Anderson's "Lucy Gray" was related to him by a Northumbrian rustic about a village beauty who died at seventeen and was followed to the grave by her lover. This fits the scene depicted in another of Wordsworth's Lucy poems, "She dwelt among the untrodden ways".

The likeness between the poems is particularly noteworthy in the first draft of Wordsworth's poem. His five stanzas in standard ballad metre are matched by Anderson's six, and both begin with flower imagery, although it is not so obvious in Wordsworth's final published version, in which he removed the original first and fourth stanzas. This succinctness makes far more pointed the revelation that the speaker is Lucy's lover; that only emerges in Wordsworth's final stanza but enters Anderson's poem at a much earlier point. Wordsworth himself does not acknowledge an influence and the only evidence that he had heard of Anderson is his subscription to the 1820 Poetical Works.

Anderson had started writing at a time when the Scots dialect poetry of Robert Burns was spawning fashionable imitations. His initial impulse to write had sprung from disgust at songs "written in a mock pastoral Scottish style" that he had encountered while in London. But this did not prevent him from writing in the same debased Lallans that he deprecated. Indeed, beside the lyrics of his in standard English set by James Hook, several others were in Anderson's derivative Scots, including "Donald of Dundee", "Bonny Jem", "Muirland Willy", "Dearly I love Johnny O" and "The Press Gang". He also used it later in a verse epistle addressed to Burns and in his narrative poems, "The Harper", "The Dying Harper" and "Fair Margaret's Bower". Shortly after his death, some of his lyrics were published alongside those of his model in the chapbook Burns' songs and Anderson's Cumberland ballads (Newcastle upon Tyne, 1839). By comparison with his writing in Scots, Anderson's own dialect work was more uncompromising and brought better success.

== See also ==
- List of 18th-century British working-class writers
