= Stephen Duck =

English poet (c. 1705-1756)

Stephen Duck (c. 1705 – 21 March 1756) was an English poet whose career reflected both Augustan interest in "naturals" (natural geniuses) and its resistance to classlessness.

== Biography ==
Duck was born at Charlton, near Pewsey, in Wiltshire. Little is known about his family, whether from Duck himself or from contemporary records, except that they were labourers and very poor. Duck attended a charity school and left at the age of thirteen to begin working in the fields.

Around 1724, he married as his first wife Ann, and began to attempt to better himself in order to escape the toil and poverty of agricultural work. Encouraged by the village squire, schoolmaster and rector, he read Milton, Dryden, Prior, and The Spectator, as well as the Holy Bible, according to Joseph Spence.

== Rise in popularity ==
He was "discovered" by Alured Clarke, a prebendary of Winchester Cathedral, who introduced him to high society. Clarke and Spence (the Professor of Poetry at Oxford University and friend of Alexander Pope) promoted Duck as a sincerely pious man of sober wit. Clarke and Spence saw poetry that Duck was writing, but none of this verse was published. Between 1724 and 1730, he and his wife Ann had three children.

In 1730, Duck combined some of the poetic pieces he had been writing into The Thresher's Labour, a poem that described the difficulty of field work. The poem was celebrated throughout London society, and he soon wrote The Shunammite, which reflected Duck's piety and religious imagination. The poet was taken to meet Queen Caroline, and, while he was there, word came of the death of his wife, but Clarke kept the news from Duck until after the interview with the queen. For her part, she was pleased and gave Duck an annuity and a small house in Richmond Park.

Duck continued to write and to be seen as both a paradigm of self-improvement and the natural poet. In 1733, Duck was made a Yeoman of the Guard by the queen, and that year he met and married Sarah Big, Caroline's housekeeper at Kew. In 1735, Caroline made him keeper of Merlin's Cave (a thatched folly containing waxworks) in Richmond Park, where he had previously worked as a gardener. During this period, Duck wrote many poems, with increasing polish and urbanity. His Poems in 1736 had both Pope and Jonathan Swift as subscribers.

== Reception ==
Swift and Pope both made disparaging remarks or outright satires on Duck. Between 1731 and 1733, Swift satirized the poverty of Duck's rhymes in several pieces. However, both men seemed to like Stephen Duck as a person, and both were impressed by his religious sincerity. When Duck was rumoured to be a candidate for the Laureate, this distinction between the private man and the quality of the verse made him a worthy target.

More charitably, George Crabbe rhetorically asks "Save honest DUCK, what son of verse could share/ The poet's rapture and the peasant's care?" in his poem The Village (1783), itself a critique of the rustic idyll.

When Queen Caroline died in 1737, Duck was left without a patron and without direct inspiration. He wrote eight very long poems after her death. In 1744, his wife Sarah died, and Stephen married again, although this wife's name is unknown. Duck was ordained in 1746 and became chaplain to Henry Cornewall and then to Ligonier's forces in 1750 before becoming the chaplain of Kew Palace. He went on to serve as the vicar of Byfleet, Surrey, where he was well liked by his congregation.

On 21 March 1756 Duck, apparently overwhelmed by the strain caused by his change in social status, committed suicide by drowning. He was buried in St Andrew's churchyard, Sonning.

An annual commemorative feast, the Duck Feast, is held at the Charlton Cat inn in the village of his birth. It is funded by the revenue from a field ("Duck's Acre") presented by Lord Palmerston, to whom Duck had dedicated a volume of poetry. Duck presided at the first feast, writing:

All eat enough and many drink too much.
Full twenty threshers quaff around the board.
No cares, no toils, no troubles now appear,
For troubles, toils and cares are drowned in Beer ...
Thus shall Tradition keep my fame alive;
The Bard may die, the Thresher still survive.

Since the 1990s, Duck and his work have generated renewed interest among New Historicist and Marxist literary critics. Duck's case featured in The New Eighteenth Century (Donna Landry), and this inspired further critical work. The Donna Landry and William Christmas edited issue of Criticism featured two articles on Duck in 2005.

== Works ==
- The Thresher's Labour (1730)
- Poems on Several Occasions (1736), reprinted ISBN 9780854178933.

== See also ==
- List of 18th-century British working-class writers
- Mary Collier
