= Divine inspiration =

Concept of a supernatural force causing a creative desire

Divine inspiration is the concept of a supernatural force, typically a deity, causing a person or people to experience a creative desire. It has been a commonly reported aspect of many religions, for thousands of years. Divine inspiration is often closely tied to the concept of revelation, information being revealed or disclosed through communication with a deity or other supernatural entity or entities.

== Examples ==
Besides ancient mythology, the religious texts of traditions including Hinduism, Judaism, Christianity, Islam, Mormonism, and the Baháʼí Faith are all claimed to be divinely inspired to some degree.

- Ancient Mesopotamia: In the Mesopotamian epic Atra-Hasis, the writer describes his work as dictated by the Goddess in a dream-vision.
- Ancient Greece: The ancient Greek muses were said to be supernatural forces that gave artists their skill, while the Ancient Greek oracles were said to be subject to supernatural forces.
- Hinduism: Music has historically been considered a medium through which performers can become a vehicle for divine inspiration. The goddess Saraswati is also sometimes invoked for assistance with inspiration.
- Judaism: Judaists believe that the Tanakh and the Talmud were divinely inspired.
- Christianity: Christians claim Biblical inspiration for the Old and New Testament, and, by some branches, the Deuterocanonical books.
- Islam: Muslims believe the Quran was verbally revealed by God to Muhammad through the angel Gabriel (Jibril),

== Plato's manias ==
Plato distinguishes four kinds of inspiration or "mania" in the dialogue Phaedrus. The word "mania" signifying that a person is caught up in a state transcending the individual consciousness. In other dialogues, Plato identifies other manias besides the four given in Phaedrus. Anger, for example, is a mania because a man may become inspired by Mars in battle and perform deeds of superhuman strength. The four given in Phaedrus, however, are called Divine as they are the inspirations which perfect the soul.

1. Poetic or Musical, inspired by the Muses, brings the disordered parts of the soul into harmony.
2. Telestic, inspired by Dionysus, purifies the soul and returns it to its ideal state of perfection and wholeness.
3. Prophetic, inspired by Apollo, concentrates the soul to a unity.
4. Amatory, inspired by Eros, conjoins the unified soul to the gods and to intelligible Beauty, effecting divine union.

== See also ==
- Afflatus, Cicero's understanding of divine inspiration
- Artistic inspiration, sudden creativity in artistic production
- Biblical inspiration, the doctrine in Judeo-Christian theology concerned with the divine origin of the Bible
- Ilham, Islamic concept of inspiration
- Muse, mythological source of artistic knowledge
- Tanzil
- Waḥy
