= Mary Masters =

English poet and letter-writer

Mary Masters (1694?-1759?) was an English poet and letter-writer of the 18th century, who has gained some historic attention because of her association with Samuel Johnson. Contemporary evaluations stress her contribution to the evolving model of women in society, both by her publishing her work, and by the themes and opinions in that work.

== Biography ==
Mary Masters, thought to have been born in 1694 in Otley, West Yorkshire was — by her own insistence – a self-taught poet of humble birth: the preface to her first collection reads:

The Author of the following Poems never read a Treatise of Rhetorick, or an Art of Poetry, nor was ever taught her English Grammar. Her Education rose no higher than the Spelling-Book, or the Writing-Master: her Genius to Poetry was always brow-beat and discountenanced by her Parents, and till her Merit got the better of her Fortune, she was shut out from all Commerce with the more knowing and polite Part of the World.

Despite this, she seems to have been known to many of the literati of the day, whose names are listed as subscribers to her two collections. James Boswell records that Dr. Johnson, whom she occasionally visited, revised her volumes and "illuminated them here and there with a ray of his own genius"; that association on its own, and the entry on Boswell's Life appear to have given Masters' name (if not her life and work) some historical currency. She is also associated with editor of the Gentleman's Magazine, Edward Cave, and whose house was one of a number in which she resided when visiting London.

In her Familiar Letters and Poems upon several Occasions (London, 1755) there are three "Short Ejaculations", the first of which, the well-known 'Tis religion that can give Sweetest pleasures while we live, has been adopted in many hymnals. The original consists of six lines only; two more were added in John Rippon's Selection of Hymns (1787), and the eight lines divided into two stanzas, in which form the hymn is now known. An ejaculation for use At the Altar, and beginning, "my ador'd Redeemer! deign to be", is sometimes met with. She is spoken of, in the Monthly Review, as "chaste, moral, and religious", and "an agreeable and ingenious writer".

She is noted as a letter-writer, and in her epistles expresses proto-feminist views.

She is supposed to have died about 1759.

== Works ==
Mary published two books of poetry, both by subscription:

1. Poems on several occasions (1733)
2. Familiar Letters and Poems on Several Occasions (1755),

== See also ==
- List of 18th-century British working-class writers

== Attribution ==
- This article incorporates text from a publication now in the public domain: Hadden, James Cuthbert (1894). "Masters, Mary". In Lee, Sidney (ed.). Dictionary of National Biography. Vol. 37. London: Smith, Elder & Co.
