= The Greater Inclination =

1899 Collection of Short Fiction by Edith Wharton

The Greater Inclination was the earliest collection of short fiction by Edith Wharton. Published by Charles Scribner's Sons on 28 March 1899, the first printing of 1,250 sold out by June 1899. The collection consisted of eight works: seven short stories, and one short play in two acts.

== Stories ==
- "The Muse's Tragedy" (Scribner's Magazine, January 1899)
- "A Journey"
- "The Pelican"
- "Souls Belated"
- "A Coward"
- "The Twilight of the God"
- "A Cup of Cold Water"
- "The Portrait"
