= Ca' the yowes =

Scottish folk song

"Ca' the yowes to the knowes"
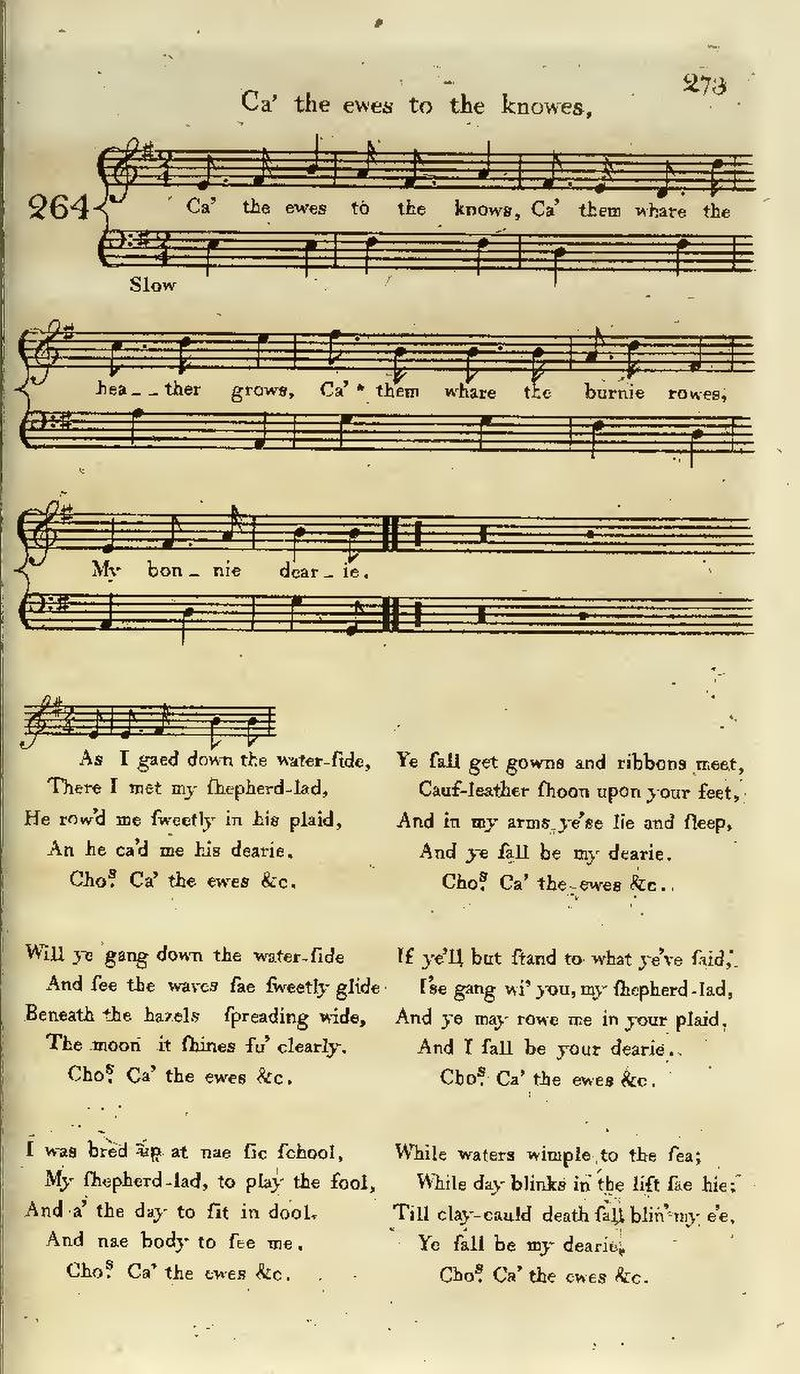
- Score for "Ca' the Yowes" from the Scots Musical Museum, Volume III (1790)

Song
- Language: Scots
- Written: 1794
- Lyricist: Isabel Pagan/Robert Burns

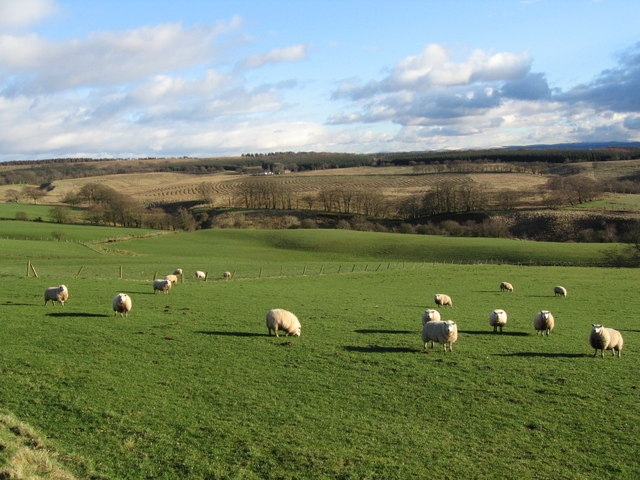
The poem makes reference to sheep farming in Ayrshire

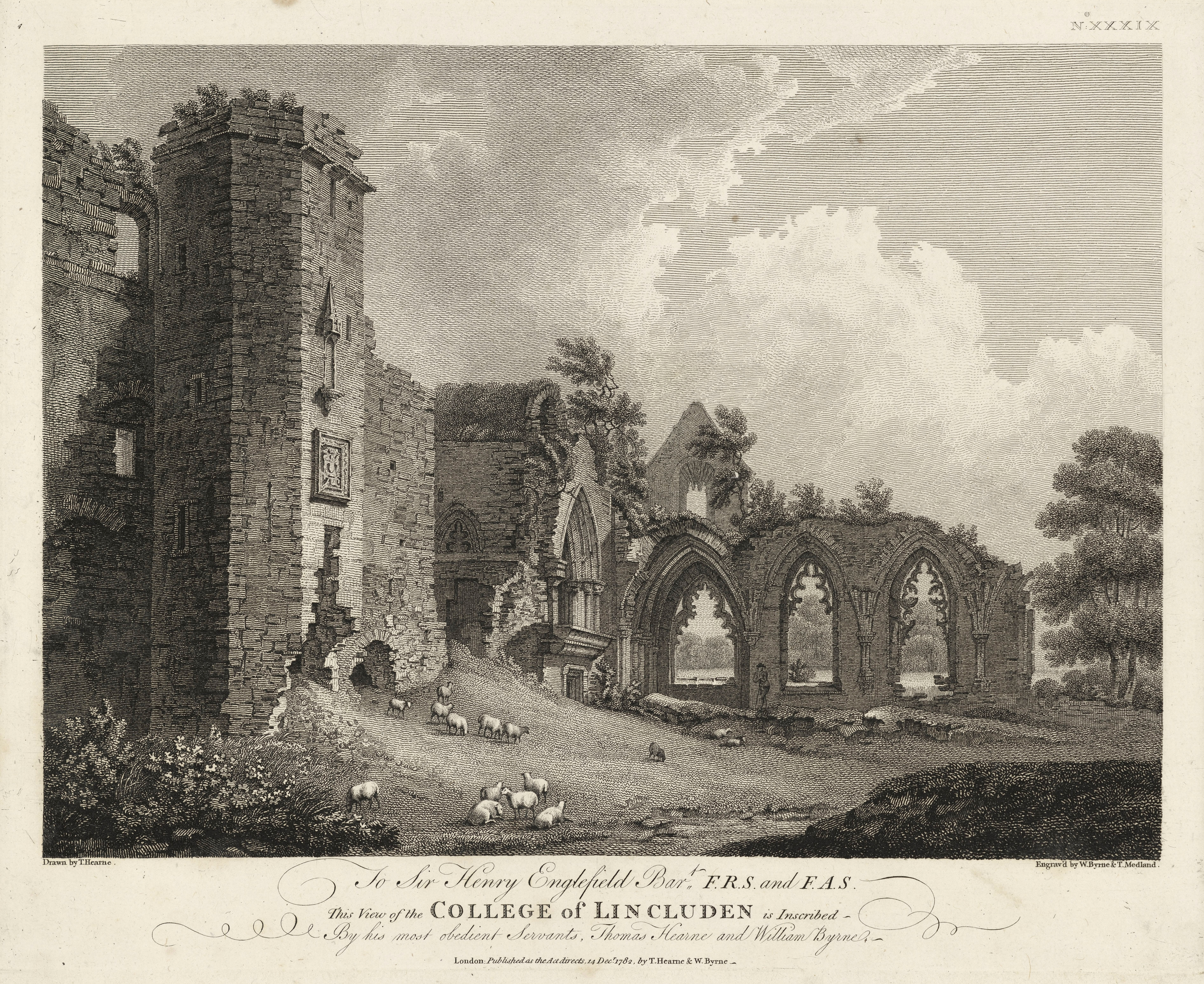
Burns's second version refers to the towers of Lincluden Abbey on Cluden Water

"Ca' the yowes to the knowes" ("Drive the ewes to the hills") is a Scottish folk song collected by Robert Burns from 1794. It has a Roud Folk Song Index number of 857.

Although sometimes attributed to Burns himself, the seven-stanza original poem is thought to be the work of Ayrshire poet Isabel Pagan, a contemporary of Burns. The poem was partially revised by Burns, and he added an eighth stanza. Burns later re-wrote the poem on a solitary stroll in the country, and this second version consists of six stanzas. It is possible that Burns was not aware that Pagan was the original author, only noting that "this song is in the true Scottish taste, yet I do not know that either air or words were ever in print before."

The original text is a pastoral love poem spoken from the point of view of a shepherdess herding her ewes ("yowes"), who has a romantic meeting with a shepherd lad. Burns's revised version is less explicit about the identity of the narrator, but follows a similar theme of love amid the beauty of nature. Both versions include the refrain, "Ca' the yowes to the knowes".

== Text ==
Original version (Pagan, ed. Burns)	English Translation	Second version (Burns)	English Translation
Refrain: Ca' the yowes to the knowes, Ca' them where the heather grows, Ca' them where the burnie rowes, My bonie dearie	Refrain: Drive the sheep to the hills Drive them where the heather grows Drive them where the stream flows My beautiful dear	Refrain: Ca'the yowes to the knowes, Ca' them where the heather grows, Ca' them where the burnie rowes, My bonie Dearie.	Refrain: Drive the sheep to the hills Drive them where the heather grows Drive them where the stream flows My beautiful dear
As I gaed down the water-side, There I met my shepherd lad: He row'd me sweetly in his plaid, And he ca'd me his dearie.	As I went down the water-side There I met my shepherd lad: He wound me sweetly in his plaid shawl, And he called me his dear.	Hark the mavis' e'ening sang, Sounding Clouden's woods amang; (Note: The Clouden refers to Cluden Water, a tributary of the River Nith in Dumfriesshire); Then a-faulding let us gang, My bonie Dearie.	Hark, the song-thrush's evening song, Resounding among Cluden's woods; Then let us drive the sheep into the fold, My beautiful dear
Will ye gang down the water-side, And see the waves sae sweetly glide Beneath the hazels spreading wide, The moon it shines fu' clearly.	Will you go down to the water-side, And see the waves so sweetly glide Beneath the hazels spreading wide, The moon it shines full clearly.	We'll gae down by Clouden side, Thro' the hazels, spreading wide, O'er the waves that sweetly glide, To the moon sae clearly.	We'll go down by the side of Cluden Water; Through the hazels, spreading wide Over the waves that sweetly glide To the moon so clearly.
Ye sall get gowns and ribbons meet, Cauf-leather shoon upon your feet, And in my arms ye'se lie and sleep, An' ye sall be my dearie.	You shall get suitable gowns and ribbons, Calf-leather shoes upon your feet, And in my arms you shall lie and sleep, And you shall be my dear.	Yonder Clouden's silent towers (Note: Clouden's silent towers may refer to the ruins of Lincluden Abbey); Where, at moonshine's midnight hours, O'er the dewy-bending flowers, Fairies dance sae cheery.	Yonder Cluden's silent towers, Where, at moonshine's midnight hours, Over the dewy bending flowers Fairies dance so cheerfully.
If ye'll but stand to what ye've said, I'se gang wi' thee, my shepherd lad, And ye may row me in your plaid, And I sall be your dearie.	If you will but stand to what you have said, I will go with you, my shepherd lad, And you may wind me in your plaid shawl, And I shall be your dear.	Ghaist nor bogle shalt thou fear, Thou'rt to Love and Heav'n sae dear, Nocht of ill may come thee near; My bonie Dearie.	Ghost nor hobgoblin shall you fear - You are to Love and Heaven so dear Nothing of ill may come you near, My lovely dear.
While waters wimple to the sea, While day blinks in the lift sae hie, Till clay-cauld death sall blin' my e'e, Ye sall be my dearie.	While waters flow to the sea, While day is shining so high, Till clay-cold death shall blind my eye, You shall be my dear.	Fair and lovely as thou art, Thou hast stown my very heart; I can die-but canna part, My bonie Dearie.	Fair and lovely as you are, You have stolen my very heart; I can die - but cannot part, My lovely dear.

== Musical performances ==
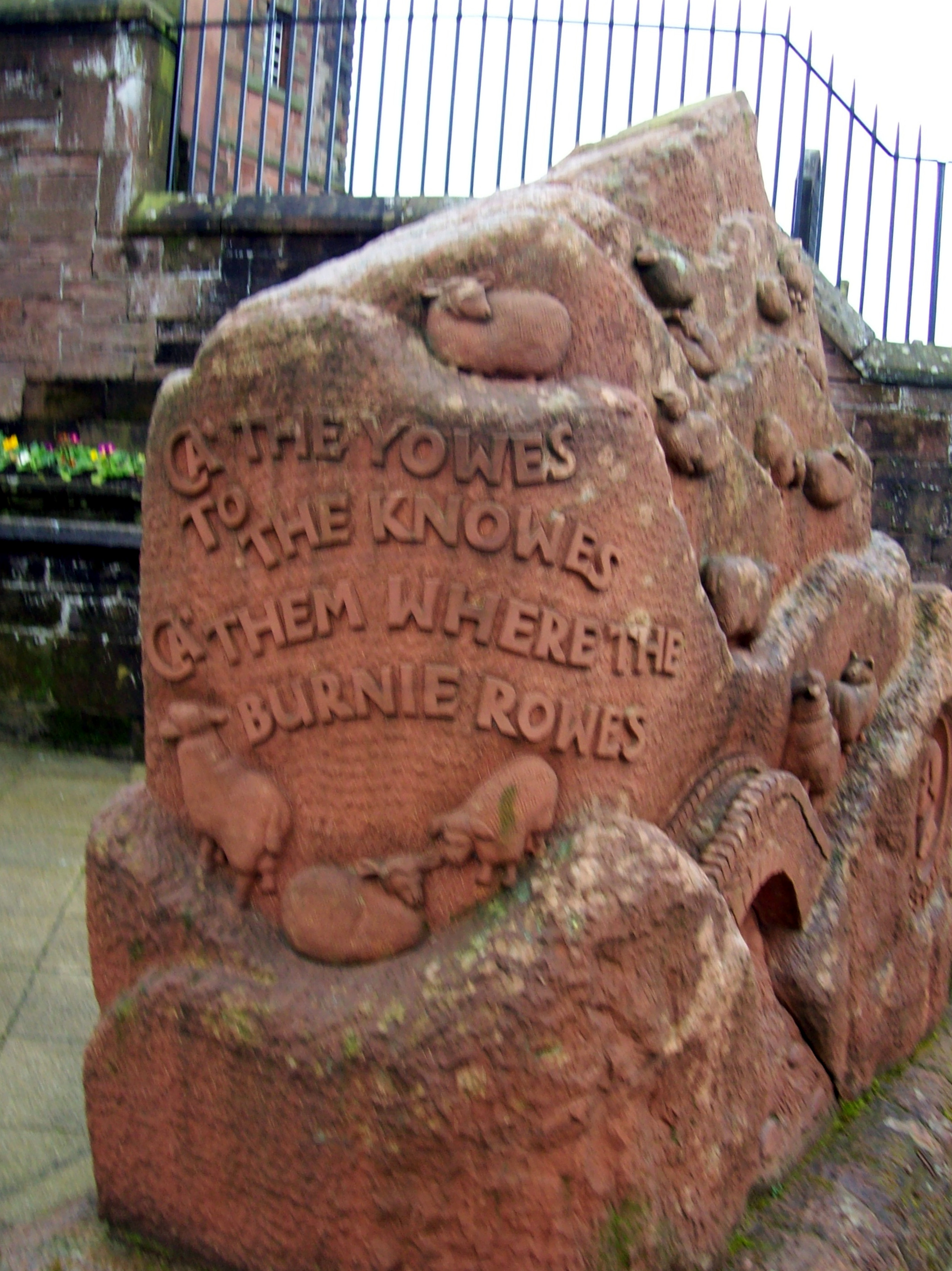
"Ca the yowes" features on a 2013 sculpture commemorating Burns outside St Michael's Church in Dumfries

The song was made widely known in recordings by Kathleen Ferrier of an arrangement by Maurice Jacobson, composer, accompanist and chairman of the music publisher Curwen. These included in recitals given by Ferrier and Bruno Walter at the Edinburgh Festival of 1952.

In 1922, the English composer and scholar of folk music Ralph Vaughan Williams wrote a choral setting of "Ca' the yowes" for tenor solo and SATB chorus. Benjamin Britten also wrote an arrangement of the song in 1951 for solo voice and piano. This version was later covered by artists like Shirley Collins and House and Land.

In 2016 a version of the song was composed by Stephen Baysted for the Project CARS videogame, which has some levels taking place in Scotland. The vocals were performed by Susan Legg.

American musician Joanna Newsom is also known to have performed this song during tours in the early 2000s. Her version is faithful to Pagan's original version though switches between Pagan's Scottish dialect and contemporary English.
