= Susannah Harrison =

Susannah Harrison (1752–1784), also known as Susanna Harrison, was an English working-class religious poet. Her 1780 collection Songs in the Night went through at least twenty-one editions in Britain and America, making it "one of the best selling collections written by a laboring-class poet in the late eighteenth century".

Harrison was a domestic servant who taught herself to read and write. Aged twenty, she suffered an illness from which she did not expect to survive and gave manuscripts of her poetry to John Conder, a Congregationalist Minister, who edited and published her poems for her. She died 3 August 1784 in Ipswich.

== Works ==
- Songs in the Night, 1780

== See also ==
- List of 18th-century British working-class writers
