= The Thresher's Labour =

1730 poem by Stephen Duck

"The Thresher's Labour" is one of three poems written by Stephen Duck in 1730. It describes Duck's struggles as an agricultural labourer, and the situation of the early eighteenth-century British working class in general. H. Gustav Klaus said it was the most accurate description of working life in verse, and praised Duck's recognition that work deserved a literary treatment. "The Thresher's Labour" became the voice, in a sense, for the rural labourers who were oppressed. It also became a model for other labouring-class artists, who began to write about their own lives and daily experiences. It was the start of a new genre of literature developed by working-class people.

== History and background ==
Duck wrote "The Thresher's Labour" after a friend, Reverend Stanley, suggested that Duck write about his life. A pirated edition of the text was published in Poems on Several Subjects in 1730, and a revised and authorised version in Poems on Several Occasions in 1736.

== Themes ==
"The Thresher's Labour" gives details about the hard, tedious labour of an agricultural worker of the 18th century:

Soon as the golden Harvest quits the Plain,
And Ceres' Gifts reward the Farmer's Pain;
What Corn each Sheaf will yield, intent to hear,
And guess from thence the Profits of the Year,
He calls his Reapers forth: Around we stand,
With deep Attention, waiting his Command.
To each our Task he readily divides,
And pointing, to our diff'rent Stations guides.
As he directs, to distant Barns we go;
Here two for Wheat, and there for Barley two.
But first, to shew what he expects to find,
These Words, or Words like these, disclose his Mind:
" So dry the Corn was carry'd from the Field,
" So easily 'twill thresh, so well 'twill yield;
" Sure large Day's-Works I well may hope for now:
" Come, strip, and try; let's see what you can do."

— Lines 13-28

His characterisation of the agricultural cycle as a destructive machine controlled by "The Master" has been contrasted with the traditional depictions of pastoral scenes.

== Response to The Thresher's Labour ==
In "The Thresher's Labour," Stephen Duck could be seen to imply that women did not contribute much during the harvests, the hardest time of the year. Duck portrays the workers as strong men, covered in dust from their work, while mentioning that the women are at home taking care of the children.

The Sweat, the Dust, and suffocating Smoke,
Make us so much like Ethiopians look,
We scare our Wives, when Ev'ning brings us home;
And frighted Infants think the Bugbear come.
Week after Week, we this dull Task pursue,
Unless when winn'wing Days produce a new;
A new, indeed, but frequently a worse!

— Lines 64-70

These statements provoked some readers, in particular Mary Collier, a washerwoman who knew that women often worked alongside the men. Collier wrote a poem called "The Woman's Labour" as a direct response to Duck's "The Thresher's Labour." "The Woman's Labour" corrects and criticizes Duck's statements about women's contributions, at times point by point.
