= Cuthbert Shaw =

English poet and actor

Cuthbert Shaw (1738/9–1771) was an English poet and actor.

== Life ==
Shaw was born in Ravensworth in the North Riding of Yorkshire; his father Cuthbert Shaw was a shoemaker. He attended the local grammar school at Kirby Hill where he paid his way by serving as an usher. He then was usher at then at Darlington grammar school.

Shaw joined a company of actors in the eastern counties. In 1760, under the name of Smith, he appeared in Samuel Foote's comedy of The Minor, relying on his good looks, which were prematurely dulled by his excesses. On 19 October 1761 he was Osman in Zara at Covent Garden, and on 14 May 1762 Pierre in Venice Preserv'd, for his own benefit. This seems to have been his last appearance on the stage.

Shaw puffed a quack medicine, the Beaume de Vie, in which he was made a partner. He married, and was next, for a short time, tutor to the young Philip Stanhope in succession to the notorious William Dodd. His young wife died in 1768. He himself died, amid many troubles, at his house in Titchfield Street, Oxford Market, on 1 September 1771.

== Works ==
Shaw published his first poem, Liberty, inscribed to the Earl of Darlington (1756). In 1760 at Bury St. Edmunds he published, under the pseudonym of W. Seymour, Odes on the Four Seasons.

Shaw made a verbal assault on the satirist Charles Churchill, by whose work he was influenced, with Robert Lloyd, George Colman and William Shirley, in The Four Farthing Candles (London, 1762). It was followed by The Race. By Mercurius Spur, esq. (1766), in which living poets contend for pre-eminence in fame by running, with a portrait of Samuel Johnson (republished in The Repository, 1790, ii. 227; and quoted in James Boswell's Life of Johnson). He published a Monody to the Memory of a Young Lady who died in Childbed, with a poetical dedication to Lord Lyttelton, (1768) after his wife's death. It caught the taste of the day, and of which a fourth edition appeared (London, 1779). Next year he found utterance in Corruption, a Satire, inscribed to Richard Grenville, Earl Temple, and subsequently (1770) in An Elegy on the Death of Charles Yorke, the Lord Chancellor, which was generally tho thought have been suppressed by the family making a payment to the author. During the final years of his life Shaw contributed to The Freeholder's Magazine and other periodicals, with caustic comments on persons and current events.

A selection of his work was printed in Robert Anderson's British Poets (1794, xi. 557), and in Thomas Park's British Poets (1808, xxxiii.), Charles Whittingham's British Poets (1822, lxiv. 47, with memoir by Richard Alfred Davenport), and Ezekiel Sandford's British Poets (1822, xxxi. 233).

Eric Partridge published Poems of Cuthbert Shaw and Thomas Russell (1925).

== See also ==
- List of 18th-century British working-class writers
