= Mary Collier =

English poet

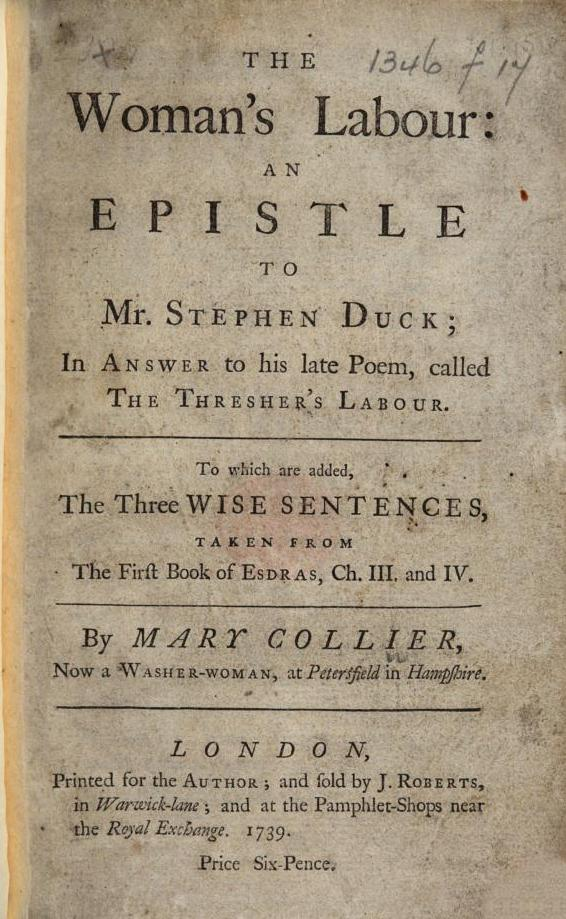
- Title page of Mary Collier's The Woman's Labour: an Epistle to Mr Stephen Duck (London, 1739)
- Born: 9 October 1688; West Sussex
- Died: 20 October 1762 (aged 74)
- Resting place: Alton, Hampshire
- Occupation: Washer-woman
- Writing career
- Language: English
- Notable work: The Woman's Labour (1739)

Mary Collier (1688–1762) was an English poet, perhaps best known for The Woman's Labour, a poem described by one commentator as a "plebeian female georgic that is also a protofeminist polemic."

== Life ==
Little is known of Collier's early life other than what she wrote in the "remarks on the author's life drawn by herself" which prefaced her Poems on Several Occasions (1762). She was from Midhurst or Lodsworth, West Sussex, born to poor parents, and educated at home. She worked as a washer-woman, brewer, and at other various jobs. In the 1720s she moved to Hampshire in search of employment. Collier initially wrote poems for her own amusement with no intent to publish; she would recite the poems to entertain her listeners, and thus brought attention to her talents. Apparently a family that employed her encouraged her to publish. She had no known dependants and supported herself through her work, so she was able to adopt what one commentator called a "feisty tone."

== Poetry ==
As she recounts in the preface to her 1762 collection, she was outraged when she read Stephen Duck's The Thresher's Labour (1730) and in response to his apparent disdain for labouring-class women, wrote the 246-line "powerful modern georgic" for which she is best remembered, The Woman's Labour: an Epistle to Mr Stephen Duck. In her riposte, she catalogues the daily tasks of a working woman, both outside the home and, at the end of the day, within the home as well:

You sup, and go to Bed without delay,
And rest yourselves till the ensuing Day;
While we, alas! but little Sleep can have... (111-113)

A second poem was printed with the Epistle to Mr. Duck. The Three Sentences is a paraphrase of the tale of the Darius contest told in 1 Esdras. Landry (1990) asserts that Collier "tends to couple moral reformism with a certain amiable accommodationism, or compliance with the will of fathers." Keegan claims this poem "suggests yet denies feminist and democratizing class politics. . . . and indeed the poem as a whole ends with a pious expression of the poet's submission to divine will."

Collier is an important figure in the self-taught, labouring-class tradition in eighteenth-century poetry, a tradition which also includes Duck, as well as Ann Yearsley, Mary Leapor, and others. Collier, Duck, and other working-class poets from rural Great Britain were responding in part to the economic upheavals in the countryside brought about by the enclosures of agricultural land and the consequent unemployment. Duck's depiction of female labourers as lazy and feckless characters particularly infuriated Collier during a period when women field labourers often lost out to men in tight rural employment markets. Collier did not make much money from her poetry and worked as a washer-woman until she was sixty-three. She continued working at other jobs for seven more years until, in poor health, she retired at age seventy and died two years later in Alton.

== Works ==
- The Woman's Labour: an Epistle to Mr Stephen Duck (London: Printed for the author; 1739)
- Poems, on several occasions, by Mary Collier, Author Of The Washerwoman's Labour, With some remarks on her life (Winchester, GB: printed by Mary Ayres for the author, 1762). Published by subscription.
- The First and Second Chapters of the First Book of Samuel Versified (1762)
- The Poems of Mary Collier (1765)

== See also ==
- List of 18th-century British working-class writers

== Resources ==
- "Collier, Mary." The Women's Print History Project, 2019, Person ID 97. Accessed 2022-08-25.
- Ferguson, Moira, editor. The Thresher's Labour, Stephen Duck (1736) and The Woman's Labour, Mary Collier (1739). William Andrews Clark Memorial Library/Augustan Reprint Society, 1985. (Internet Archive)
- Goodridge, John. "Stephen Duck, The Thresher's Labour and Mary Collier, The Woman's Labour." The Blackwell Companion to Eighteenth-Century Poetry, edited by Christine Gerrard, Blackwell, 2006, pp. 209–22.
- Jones, William R. "Collier, Mary (1688?–1762)." Oxford Dictionary of National Biography. Ed. H. C. G. Matthew and Brian Harrison. Oxford: OUP, 2004. 14 Nov 2008.
- Landry, Donna. The Muses of Resistance: Laboring-Class Women's Poetry in Britain, 1739-1796. Cambridge University Press, 1990 ISBN 052137412X (Open Access at Internet Archive)
- Landry, Donna. "The Resignation of Mary Collier: Some Problems in Feminist Literary History." The New Eighteenth Century: Theory-Politics-English Literature, edited by Felicity Nussbaum and Laura Brown, Methuen, 1987, pp. 35–8.
- Mary Collier (c. 1688-c. 1762). Labouring-class poets online. Accessed 25 August 2022.
- "Mary Collier." Orlando: Women's Writing in the British Isles from the Beginnings to the Present. Accessed 25 August 2022.
- Thompson, E.P. and Marian Sugden, editors. The Thresher's Labour by Stephen Duck, The Woman's Labour by Mary Collier, Two Eighteenth Century Poems. The Merlin Press, 1989. (Internet Archive)
- Todd, Janet, ed. "Collier, Mary (fl. 1740–1760)." A dictionary of British and American women writers, 1660–1800. Rowman & Littlefield, 1987.

== Etexts ==
- The Woman's Labour: an Epistle to Mr Stephen Duck (London: Printed for the author; 1739) (Google Books) (Internet Archive) (Internet Archive)
- Poems, on several occasions, by Mary Collier, Author Of The Washerwoman's Labour, With some remarks on her life (Winchester, GB: printed by Mary Ayres for the author, 1762).(Google Books)

(Petersfield: W. Minchin, 1820). (Google Books)
