= James Maxwell (poet) =

Scottish poet and essayist (1720–1800)

James Maxwell (9 May 1720 – 1800) was a Scottish poet and essayist, known as the "Poet in Paisley".

== Life ==
Maxwell was born in Auchenback, Renfrewshire, on 9 May 1720. Most of the details of his life come from his autobiographical poem of 1795. Aged 20 he went to England with a hardware pack; he was not successful, and was a weaver for twenty years, and later a tradesman's clerk and a school usher. He returned to Scotland and for a period was a schoolmaster. Eventually Maxwell settled in Paisley, Renfrewshire in 1782. The following year he was destitute and worked breaking stones for highways; afterwards he sold pamphlets and his own publications, eventually selling only his own works. In 1787 the town council of Paisley gave him a pension; he died in the spring of 1800.

He usually designating himself "Poet in Paisley"; sometimes on the title-page he added to his name the letters S.D.P.: "Student of Divine Poetry". James Cuthbert Hadden wrote "He rarely rises above doggerel" in his article on Maxwell in the Dictionary of National Biography.

== Works ==
His works include moral essays, and poems about industrial progress. A bibliography, comprising fifty-two separate publications, is given in Robert Brown's Paisley Poets, volume 1, pages 17–23.

Works include:

- Divine Miscellanies; or, Sacred Poems (Birmingham, 1756)
- Hymns and Spiritual Songs (London, 1759)
- A new Version of the whole Book of Psalms in Metre (Glasgow, 1773)
- The Wonder of Wonders: or, The Cotton Manufacture. A Poem. Being a general account of the rapid progress of that branch and other, at the new Town of Johnstone.... (Paisley, 1785)
- Happiness. A Moral Essay shewing the Vain Pursuits of Mankind after Happiness.... (Paisley, 1786)
- The Great Canal; or, the Forth and Clyde Navigation. A Poem descriptive of that Useful and Extensive Undertaking.... (Paisley, 1788)
- Animadversions on some Poets and Poetasters of the Present Age (Paisley, 1788), a poem in which his contemporaries Robert Burns and John Lapraik are regarded unfavourably
- On the French Revolution. A Moral Essay on the Rights of Man (Paisley, 1792)
- A Brief Narrative, or, Some Remarks on the Life of James Maxwell, Poet, in Paisley, an autobiographical poem, written in his seventy-sixth year (Paisley, 1795)

== See also ==
- List of 18th-century British working-class writers
