= List of 18th-century British working-class writers =

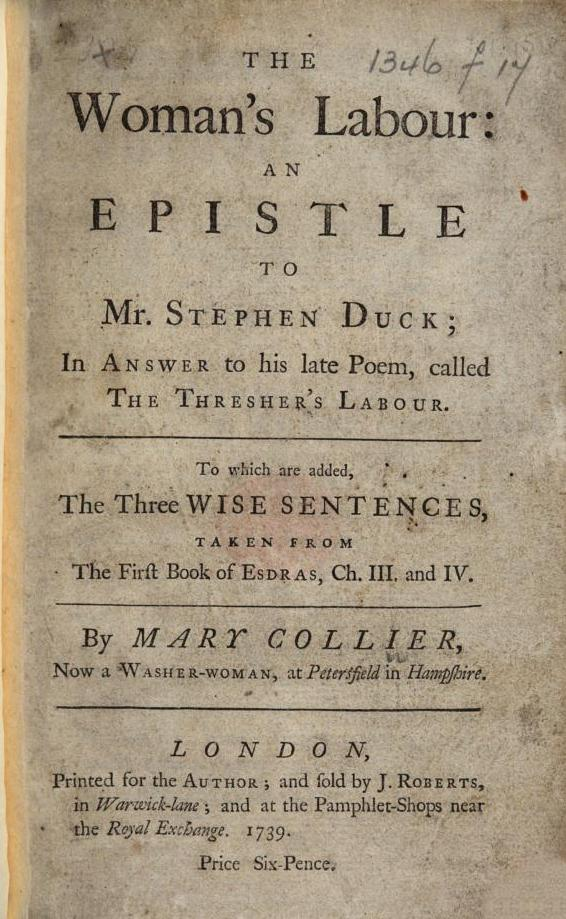
Title page of Mary Collier's The Woman's Labour: an Epistle to Mr Stephen Duck (London, 1739) (Google Books)

This list focuses on published authors whose working-class status or background was part of their literary reputation. These were, in the main, writers without access to formal education, so they were either autodidacts or had mentors or patrons. This lack of standardized education gave rise to the notion of the "rough," "untutored," "natural" artist. There was a vogue among middle- and upper-class readers, particularly later in the eighteenth-century and throughout the Romantic era, for writers with an "interesting story of genius-in-rags," for "the Unschooled Sons" — and daughters — "of Genius."

== Writers ==
- Robert Anderson (1770–1833): "the Cumberland bard"
- Peter Aram (1667–1735)
- John Bancks (1709–1751)
- Anne Bannerman (1765–1829)
- Mary Barber (c.1685 – c.1755)
- John Bennet (fl. 1774—1796)
- Elizabeth Bentley (1767-1839): "the Norwich maiden"
- Thomas Blacklock (1721—1791)
- Robert Bloomfield (1766—1823)
- William Brimble (fl. 1765)
- Michael Bruce (1746–1767)
- John Frederick Bryant (1753-91)
- Robert Burns (1759-96)
- George Campbell (c. 1761-1818)
- Ann Candler (1740—1814): "the Suffolk cottager"
- Margaret Catchpole (1762–1819), convict chronicler deported to Australia
- Thomas Chatterton (1752—1770)
- Edward Chicken (1698–1746): "the Mayor of White Cross"
- Mary Collier (c. 1688 – 1762): "the washerwoman of Petersfield"
- Mary Davys (1674?–1732)
- Robert Dodsley (1703–1764)
- Stephen Duck (c. 1705 – 1756): "the Thresher poet"
- N. Elliot (fl. 1767—1776)
- William Falconer (1732 – c. 1770)
- John Forster (fl. 1797)
- John Freeth (1731-1808): Poet Freeth; John Free
- John Frizzle (fl. 1733)
- William Gifford (1756–1826)
- Jean Glover (1758–1801)
- Constantia Grierson (c. 1705 – 1732)
- Elizabeth Hands (1746-1815): "Daphne"
- Susannah Harrison (1752—1784)
- William Job (fl. 1785)
- Christopher Jones (fl. 1775—1782)
- Henry Jones (1721–1770)
- William Lane (b. 1744)
- Samuel Law (fl. 1772)
- Mary Leapor (1722—1746): "Mira"
- John Learmont (fl. 1791-1818)
- John Leyden (1775–1811)
- Isabella Lickbarrow (1784—1847)
- Janet Little (1759-1813): "the Scotch milkmaid"
- David Love (1750-1827)
- John Lucas (fl. 1776—1781)
- Mary Masters (c. 1694 – c. 1759)
- James Maxwell (1720–1800): the "poet in paisley"
- Christian Milne (1772—1816)
- Henry Nelson (fl. 1725–1729)
- William Newton (1750–1830): "the Peak minstrel"
- Thomas Olivers (1725—1799)
- Anne Ross (fl. 1791 to 1798)
- Edward Rushton (1756-1814)
- Cuthbert Shaw (1739—1771)
- David Sillar (1760-1830)
- Thomas Spence (1750-1814)
- John Stagg: "the Cumbrian minstrel"
- Robert Tatersal (fl. 1734–1735)
- Ellen Taylor (fl. 1792): "the Irish cottager"
- James Thompson (1763–1832)
- Samuel Thomson (1766-1816)
- William Vernon (born 1734)
- W. W. (‘A Weaver’) (fl. 1770-72)
- John Walker (fl. 1789)
- Ned Ward (1667–1731)
- James Eyre Weekes (fl. 1743—1753)
- James Wheeler (c. 1718-88)
- Edward Williams (1747–1826): Iolo Morganwg
- Alexander Wilson (1766-1813): the "Father of American Ornithology"
- Anne Wilson (fl. 1778—1783)
- Gavin Wilson (fl. 1788)
- Jane Wiseman (1673 – 1717)
- James Woodhouse (1735–1820): the "shoe-maker poet"
- Ann Wylie (fl. 1741)
- Ann Yearsley (1753–1806): the "milk-maid poet"; the "Clifton milkwoman"

== See also ==
- Abolitionism in the United Kingdom
- Captivity narrative
- Education Act
- History of education in England
- Pastoral
- Political poetry
- Proletarian literature
- Romanticism
- Slave narrative
- Slavery in the British Isles

== Resources ==
- Andrews, Corey E. "'Work' Poems: Assessing the Georgic Mode of Eighteenth-Century Working-Class Poetry." Experiments in Genre in Eighteenth-Century Literature. Ed. Sandro Jung. Ghent, Belgium: Academia Press, 2011, pp. 105–133. ISBN 9789038216638
- Ashraf, Mary. Introduction to Working-Class Literature in Great Britain. Two vols. East Berlin, 1978.
- Basker, James G., ed. Amazing Grace: An Anthology of Poems about Slavery 1660-1810. New Haven and London: Yale University Press, 2002.
- Batt, Jennifer. "Eighteenth century labouring-class writing." Great Writers Inspire. University of Oxford, 24 May 2012. Accessed 24 August 2022.
- Blair, Kirstie, and Mina Gorji, eds. Class and the Canon: Constructing Labouring-Class Poetry and Poetics, 1780-1900. London: Palgrave Macmillan, 2013. doi:10.1057/9781137030337 ISBN 978-1-137-03032-0
- Boos, Florence S. "The Poetics of the Working Classes." Victorian Poetry, vol. 39, no. 2, 2001, pp. 103–10. JSTOR. Accessed 24 Aug. 2022.
- Christmas, William J. The Lab'ring Muses: Work, Writing, and the Social Order in English Plebeian Poetry, 1730–1830.
- Evans, Gareth. "British Working Class and Socialist Writing: A Bibliography of Critical Material." The Radical Teacher Issue:48 (1996-04-30):17 ISSN 0191-4847
- Ferguson, Moira. Eighteenth-century women poets: nation, class, and gender. Albany: State University of New York Press, 1995. ISBN 0585046158 ISBN 9780585046150 OCLC 42854982
- Goodridge, John, Simon Kövesi, David Fairer, Tim Burke, William Christmas, and Bridget Keegan, eds. Eighteenth-Century English Labouring-Class Poets, 1700–1740, 3 vols. Routledge, 2003. ISBN 9781138752894 ISBN 9781138752900 ISBN 9781138752917
- Goodridge, John, and Bridget Keegan, eds. A History of British Working Class Literature. Cambridge University Press, 2017. ISBN 9781108105392 doi:10.1017/9781108105392
- Goodridge, John. "Labouring-Class Poetry." Teaching Romanticism. Teaching the New English. Eds. D. Higgins and S. Ruston. London: Palgrave Macmillan, 2010, pp. 11–23. doi:10.1057/9780230276482_2
- Hall, Edith, and Henry Stead. "18th-century working-class poets." A People’s History of Classics. Routledge, 2020. ISBN 9781315446608
- Harvey, A.D.. "Working-Class Poets and Self-Education." Contemporary Review. May 1999.
- Heinzelman, Kurt. "The Uneducated Imagination: Romantic Representations of Labor." At the Limits of Romanticism: Essays in Cultural, Feminist, and Materialist Criticism. Ed. Mary A. Favret and Nicola J. Watson. Bloomington, Indiana: Indiana University Press, 1994, 101-24.
- Hudson, Nicholas. "Literature and Social Class in the Eighteenth Century." Oxford Handbook Topics in Literature (online edn, Oxford Academic, 16 Dec. 2013). Accessed 23 Aug. 2022.
- Keegan, Bridget. British Labouring-Class Nature Poetry, 1730-1837. London: Palgrave Macmillan, 2008. ISBN 978-0-230-58390-0 doi:10.1057/9780230583900
- Klaus, H. Gustav. The Literature of Labour: 200 Years of Working-Class Writing. Brighton: Harvester, 1985.
- Kord, Susanne. Women peasant poets in eighteenth-century England, Scotland, and Germany: milkmaids on Parnassus. Rochester, N.Y.: Camden House, 2003. ISBN 1571132686 ISBN 9781571132680 OCLC 50643919
- Donna Landry. "The Labouring-Class Women Poets: Hard Labour we most chearfully pursue." Women and Poetry, 1660-1750. Eds. Sarah Prescott and David Shuttleton. Houndmills: Palgrave Macmillan, 2003, pp. 223–43.
- Landry, Donna. The Muses of Resistance: Laboring-Class Women's Poetry in Britain, 1739-1796. Cambridge University Press, 1990 ISBN 052137412X (Open Access at Internet Archive)
- Murphy, Paul Thomas. Toward a working-class canon: literary criticism in British working-class periodicals, 1816-1858. Columbus: Ohio State University Press, 1994. ISBN 0814206549 ISBN 9780814206546 OCLC 30624732
- Niepytalska, Marta, "Anne Milne on 'British Eighteenth-Century Laboring-Class Poets.'" Carson Fellow Portraits. Directed by Alec Hahn. Filmed May 2011. MPEG video, 3:41. .
- Scrivener, Michael. "Laboring-Class Poetry in the Romantic Era." A Companion to Romantic Poetry 2012, pp. 234–250. doi:10.1002/9781444390650.ch14
- Scrivener, Michael. Poetry and reform : periodical verse from the English democratic press, 1792-1824. Detroit: Wayne State University Press, 1992. ISBN 0814323782 ISBN 9780814323786 OCLC 25713300
- Southey, Robert. The Lives and Works of Our Uneducated Poets. Ed. J.S. Childers. London: Oxford University Press, 1925. First pub. as Attempts in Verse, by John Jones, an Old Servant; with Some account of the Writer, Written by Himself; and an Introductory Essay on the Lives and Works of Uneducated Poets, by Robert Southey, Esq., Poet Laureate (London, 1831).
- Williams, John. "Displacing Romanticism: Anna Seward, Joseph Weston and the Unschooled Sons of Genius." Placing and Displacing Romanticism. Ed. Peter J. Kitson. London: Ashgate, 2001, 48-59.
