= Genius (literature) =

Concept in literary theory and literary history

The concept of genius, in literary theory and literary history, derives from the later 18th century, when it began to be distinguished from ingenium in a discussion of the genius loci, or "spirit of the place". It was a way of discussing essence, in that each place was supposed to have its own unique and immutable nature, but this essence was determinant, in that all persons of a place would be infused or inspired by that nature. In the early nationalistic literary theories of the Augustan era, each nation was supposed to have a nature determined by its climate, air, and fauna that made a nation's poetry, manners, and art singular. It created national character.

T. V. F. Brogan argues that "genius" is a middle term in the evolution of the idea of inspiration and poetic ability from a belief in an external source (afflatus, or divine infection, and poetic phrenzy, or divine madness) and an internal source (imagination and the subconscious). However, the concept became nearly identical with poetic madness and divine madness in later Romanticism. The word itself was conflated with the Latin ingenium (natural ability) by the time of the Renaissance, and it thereby becomes a natural spirit or natural essence unique to the individual and yet derived from the place. In this sense, it is still a term synonymous with skill.

== Romanticism and genius ==
Edward Young's Conjectures on Original Composition (1759) was the most significant reformulation of "genius" away from "ability" and toward the Romantic concept of "genius" as seer or visionary. His essay influenced the Sturm und Drang German theorists, and these influenced Samuel Taylor Coleridge's Biographia Literaria. The Romantics saw genius as superior to skill, as being far above ability. James Russell Lowell would say "talent is that which is in a man's power: genius is that in whose power a man is" (quoted in Brogan). The emphasis on Gothic literature, on the sublime in general, and the poet as spokesman of a nation's consciousness allowed the declining meaning of "genius" as "natural spirit of the place" and the emergent meaning of "genius" as "inherent and irrational ability" to combine. At the same time, Romanticism's definition of genius as a person driven by a force beyond their control and as an ability that surpasses the natural and exceeds the human mind makes it virtually identical with the Classical notion of divine madness or frenzy.

With the incorporation of Sigmund Freud's theories of poetic madness and the irrationality of imagination deriving from the subconscious, "genius" in poetry entered 20th century critical parlance as, again, something inherent in the writer. The writer was special and set aside from others by "genius", which might be a psychic wound or a particular formation of the ego but which was nonetheless unique to that particular person and was the critical feature that made that person an artist. Irving Babbitt's writings discuss the genius in the Modernist view. Again, genius is something above skill, something that cannot be explained, contained, or diagnosed.

Since Modernism's decline, "genius" has faded somewhat from critical discussions. As writing has focused on its own media and writers have focused on process (e.g. the L=A=N=G=U=A=G=E poets and post-modernism), the belief in a special trait that makes the artist above the run of humanity, and more particularly the view that skill is inferior to imagination, has been in decline. However, there is an emergent concept of genius associated with the culture of certain contemporary literary circles. Such an image of genius is often defined in opposition to the figure of the critic, the former being more independent and spontaneous in their thought, the latter being more self-reflective but consequently restricted to responding to, rather than creating, enduring cultural artifacts. The earliest version of this formulation is to be found in Gotthold Ephraim Lessing's commentary on Immanuel Kant's notion of genius. Kant scholar Jane Kneller articulates the subtlety of his distinction by explaining "genius demonstrates its autonomy not by ignoring all rules, but by deriving the rules from itself."

== See also ==
- Artistic inspiration is closely related to "genius" in poetic theory.
- Afflatus is tied to the Romantic discussion of genius.
- Muses for invocatory practice.
