= Afflatus =

Latin term

Afflatus is a Latin term used by Cicero in De Natura Deorum, ("The Nature of the Gods") and has been translated as "inspiration".

Cicero's usage was a literalising of "inspiration", which had already become figurative. As "inspiration" had come to mean simply the gathering of a new idea, Cicero reiterated the idea of a rush of unexpected breath, a powerful force that would render the poet helpless and unaware of its origin.

Literally, the Latin afflatus means "to blow upon/toward". It was originally spelled adflatus, made up of ad (to) and flatus (blowing/breathing), the noun form of flāre (to blow). It can be taken to mean "to be blown upon" by a divine wind, like its English equivalent inspiration, which comes from inspire, meaning "to breathe/blow onto".

In English, afflatus is used for the literal form of inspiration. It generally refers not to the usual sudden originality but the staggering and stunning blow of a new idea, which the recipient may be unable to explain. In Romantic literature and criticism, in particular, the usage of afflatus was revived for the mystical form of poetic inspiration tied to genius, such as the story Samuel Taylor Coleridge offered for the composition of "Kubla Khan". The frequent use of the Aeolian harp as a symbol for the poet was a play on the renewed emphasis on afflatus.

Divino afflante Spiritu ('Inspired by the Holy Spirit') is an encyclical letter of Pope Pius XII dealing with Biblical inspiration and Biblical criticism. It laid out his desire to see new translations from the original language instead of the Vulgate.

== See also ==
- Divine inspiration
- List of Latin phrases (N): "Nemo igitur vir magnus sine aliquo adflatu divino umquam fuit" (No great man ever existed who did not enjoy some portion of divine inspiration).
