= Christian Milne =

Scottish poet

- Born: Christian Ross; 15 May 1773; Inverness, U.K.
- Died: after June 1816
- Occupation: Poet

Christian Milne (15 May 1773 – after June 1816) was a Scottish poet of the Romantic Era.

== Early life ==
Christian Ross was born in Inverness in 1773, the daughter of Thomas Ross and Mary Gordon. According to her, her father was a housewright and a cabinet-maker, and her mother died when she was very young; her father remarried a year later, to Mary Denton. She briefly attended a school in Auchentoul, began rhyming before her teens, and was sent into service at the age of fourteen in Aberdeen.

== Career ==
Shortly after her marriage to Patrick Milne, a ship's carpenter, Milne's poetry was shown to a Captain Livingston, a man of influence in Aberdeen, and together with other gentlemen (the Right Reverend Bishop Skinner and Mr. Ewen) he arranged for Milne to have a subscription list of 500 and sales of 600 on her book, which was published in 1805. The profits of £100 were invested in a vessel in which her husband was made master. She had eight children and although she apparently still wrote poetry she had no further work published. An interview and poem by her is included in Sketches of obscure poets, with specimens of their writings.

She died after June 1816.

== Works ==
- 1805: Simple Poems on Simple Subjects. Aberdeen: Printed for the author by J. Chalmers & Co.

== See also ==
- List of 18th-century British working-class writers
