= Artistic inspiration =

Unconscious burst of creativity

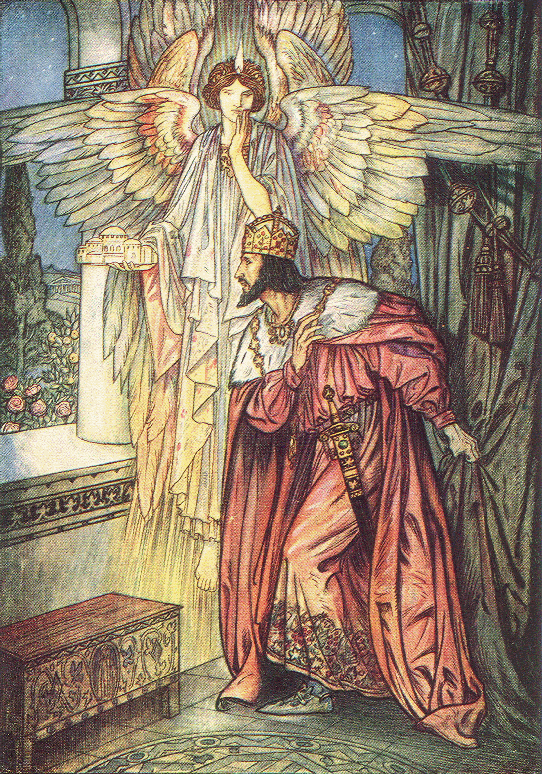
Book illustration of Byzantine Emperor Justinian's inspiration for Hagia Sophia. The cathedral had burnt down during a riot; now Justinian would build an even more beautiful one.

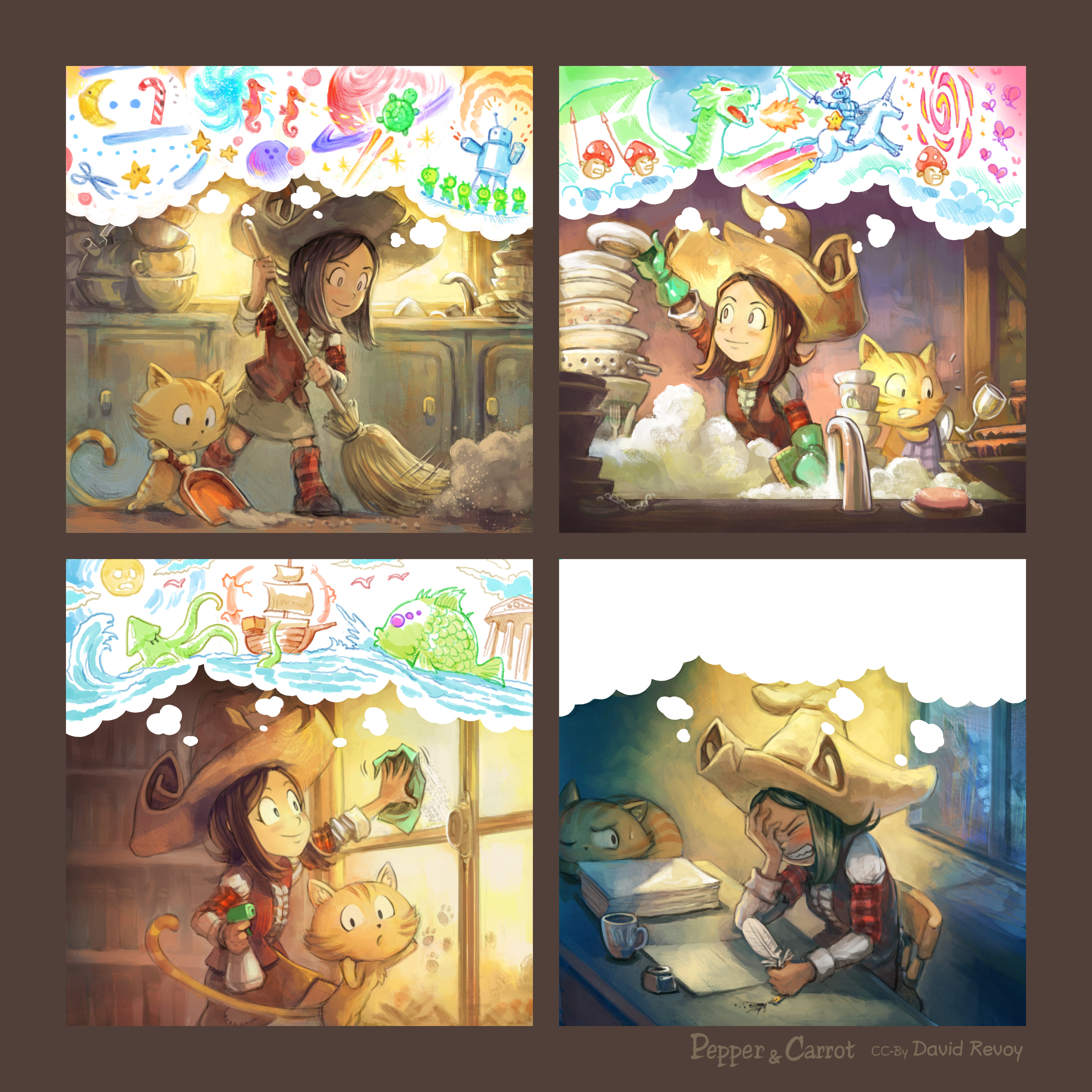
A webcomic of Pepper&Carrot illustrating how inspiration may vary over time

Inspiration (from the Latin inspirare, meaning "to breathe into") is a burst of creativity in a literary, musical, or visual art and other artistic endeavours without thinking. The concept has origins in both Hellenism and Hebraism. The Greeks believed that inspiration or "enthusiasm" came from the muses, as well as the gods Apollo and Dionysus. Similarly, in the Ancient Norse religions, inspiration derives from the gods, such as Odin. Inspiration is also a divine matter in Hebrew poetics. In the Book of Amos the prophet speaks of being overwhelmed by God's voice and compelled to speak. In Christianity, inspiration is a gift of the Holy Spirit.

In the 18th century philosopher John Locke proposed a model of the human mind in which ideas associate or resonate with one another in the mind. In the 19th century, Romantic poets such as Coleridge and Shelley believed that inspiration came to a poet because the poet was attuned to the (divine or mystical) "winds" and because the soul of the poet was able to receive such visions. In the early 20th century, psychoanalyst Sigmund Freud believed himself to have located inspiration in the inner psyche of the artist. Psychiatrist Carl Gustav Jung's theory of inspiration suggests that an artist is one who was attuned to their creative instinct which encoded the archetypes of the human mind.

The Marxist theory of art sees it as the expression of the friction between economic base and economic superstructural positions, or as an unaware dialog of competing ideologies, or as an exploitation of a "fissure" in the ruling class's ideology. In modern psychology inspiration is not frequently studied, but it is generally seen as an entirely internal process.

== History of the concepts ==
=== Ancient models of inspiration ===
In Greek thought, inspiration meant that the poet or artist would go into ecstasy or furor poeticus, the divine frenzy or poetic madness. The artist would be transported beyond their own mind and given the gods' or goddesses own thoughts to embody.

Inspiration is prior to consciousness and outside of skill (ingenium in Latin). Technique and performance are independent of inspiration, and therefore it is possible for the non-poet to be inspired and for a poet or painter's skill to be insufficient to the inspiration. In Hebrew poetics, inspiration is similarly a divine matter. In the Book of Amos, 3:8 the prophet speaks of being overwhelmed by God's voice and compelled to speak. However, inspiration is also a matter of revelation for the prophets, and the two concepts are intermixed to some degree. Revelation is a conscious process, where the writer or painter is aware and interactive with the vision, while inspiration is involuntary and received without any complete understanding.

In Christianity, inspiration is a gift of the Holy Spirit. Saint Paul said that all scripture is given by inspiration of God (2 Timothy) and the account of Pentecost records the Holy Spirit descending with the sound of a mighty wind. This understanding of "inspiration" is vital for those who maintain Biblical literalism, for the authors of the scriptures would, if possessed by the voice of God, not "filter" or interpose their personal visions onto the text. For church fathers like Saint Jerome, David was the perfect poet, for he best negotiated between the divine impulse and the human consciousness.

In northern societies, such as Old Norse, inspiration was likewise associated with a gift of the gods. As with the Greek, Latin, and Romance literatures, Norse skalds were inspired by a magical and divine state and then shaped the words with their conscious minds. Their training was an attempt to learn to shape forces beyond the human. In the Venerable Bede's account of Cædmon, the Christian and later Germanic traditions combine. Cædmon was a herder with no training or skill at verse. One night, he had a dream where Jesus asked him to sing. He then composed "Cædmon's Hymn", and from then on was a great poet. Inspiration in the story is the product of grace: it is unsought (though desired), uncontrolled, and irresistible, and the poet's performance involves his whole mind and body, but it is fundamentally a gift.

=== Renaissance revival of furor poeticus ===
The Greco-Latin doctrine of the divine origin of poetry was available to medieval authors through the writings of Horace (on Orpheus) and others, but it was the Latin translations and commentaries by the neo-platonic author Marsilio Ficino of Plato's dialogues Ion and (especially) Phaedrus at the end of the 15th century that led to a significant return of the conception of furor poeticus. Ficino's commentaries explained how gods inspired the poets, and how this frenzy was subsequently transmitted to the poet's auditors through his rhapsodic poetry, allowing the listener to come into contact with the divine through a chain of inspiration. Ficino himself sought to experience ecstatic rapture in rhapsodic performances of Orphic-Platonic hymns accompanied by a lyre.

The doctrine was also an important part of the poetic program of the French Renaissance poets collectively referred to as La Pléiade (Pierre de Ronsard, Joachim du Bellay, etc.); a full theory of divine fury / enthusiasm was elaborated by Pontus de Tyard in his Solitaire Premier, ou Prose des Muses, et de la fureur poétique (Tyard classified four kinds of divine inspiration: (1) poetic fury, gift of the Muses; (2) knowledge of religious mysteries, through Bacchus; (3) prophecy and divination through Apollo; (4) inspiration brought on by Venus/Eros.)

=== Enlightenment and Romantic models ===
In the 18th century in England, nascent psychology competed with a renascent celebration of the mystical nature of inspiration. John Locke's model of the human mind suggested that ideas associate with one another and that a string in the mind can be struck by a resonant idea. Therefore, inspiration was a somewhat random but wholly natural association of ideas and sudden unison of thought. Additionally, Lockean psychology suggested that a natural sense or quality of mind allowed persons to see unity in perceptions and to discern differences in groups. This "fancy" and "wit," as they were later called, were both natural and developed faculties that could account for greater or lesser insight and inspiration in poets and painters. Imagination, the Romantics argued, is a tool to see things that the intelligence is blind to.

The musical model was satirized, along with the afflatus, and "fancy" models of inspiration, by Jonathan Swift in A Tale of a Tub. Swift's narrator suggests that madness is contagious because it is a ringing note that strikes "chords" in the minds of followers and that the difference between an inmate of Bedlam and an emperor was what pitch the insane idea was. At the same time, he satirized "inspired" radical Protestant ministers who preached through "direct inspiration." In his prefatory materials, he describes the ideal dissenter's pulpit as a barrel with a tube running from the minister's posterior to a set of bellows at the bottom, whereby the minister could be inflated to such an extent that he could shout out his inspiration to the congregation. Furthermore, Swift saw fancy as an antirational, mad quality, where, "once a man's fancy gets astride his reason, common sense is kick't out of doors."

The divergent theories of inspiration that Swift satirized would continue, side by side, through the 18th and 19th centuries. Edward Young's Conjectures on Original Composition was pivotal in the formulation of Romantic notions of inspiration. He said that genius is "the god within" the poet who provides the inspiration. Thus, Young agreed with psychologists who were locating inspiration within the personal mind (and significantly away from the realm either of the divine or demonic) and yet still positing a supernatural quality. Genius was an inexplicable, possibly spiritual and possibly external, font of inspiration. In Young's scheme, the genius was still somewhat external in its origin, but Romantic poets would soon locate its origin wholly within the poet. Romantic writers such as Ralph Waldo Emerson (The Poet), and Percy Bysshe Shelley saw inspiration in terms similar to the Greeks: it was a matter of madness and irrationality.

Inspiration came because the poet tuned himself to the (divine or mystical) "winds" and because he was made in such a way as to receive such visions. Samuel Taylor Coleridge's accounts of inspiration were the most dramatic, and his The Eolian Harp was only the best of the many poems Romantics would write comparing poetry to a passive reception and natural channelling of the divine winds. The story he told about the composition of Kubla Khan has the poet reduced to the level of scribe. William Butler Yeats would later experiment and value automatic writing. Inspiration was evidence of genius, and genius was a thing that the poet could take pride in, even though he could not claim to have created it himself.

=== Modernist and modern concepts ===
Sigmund Freud and other later psychologists located inspiration in the inner psyche of the artist. The artist's inspiration came out of unresolved psychological conflict or childhood trauma. Further, inspiration could come directly from the unconscious. Like the Romantic genius theory and the revived notion of "poetic phrenzy," Freud saw artists as fundamentally special, and fundamentally wounded. Because Freud situated inspiration in the unconscious mind, Surrealist artists sought out this form of inspiration by turning to dream diaries and automatic writing, the use of Ouija boards and found poetry to try to tap into what they saw as the true source of art. Carl Gustav Jung's theory of inspiration reiterated the other side of the Romantic notion of inspiration indirectly by suggesting that an artist is one who was attuned to something impersonal, something outside of the individual experience: racial memory, or a 'Psychopoetry' experience.

Materialist theories of inspiration again diverge between purely internal and purely external sources. Karl Marx did not treat the subject directly, but the Marxist theory of art sees it as the expression of the friction between economic base and economic superstructural positions, or as an unaware dialog of competing ideologies, or as an exploitation of a "fissure" in the ruling class's ideology. Therefore, where there have been fully Marxist schools of art, such as Soviet Realism, the "inspired" painter or poet was also the most class-conscious painter or poet, and "formalism" was explicitly rejected as decadent (e.g. Sergei Eisenstein's late films condemned as "formalist error"). Outside of state-sponsored Marxist schools, Marxism has retained its emphasis on the class consciousness of the inspired painter or poet, but it has made room for what Frederic Jameson called a "political unconscious" that might be present in the artwork. However, in each of these cases, inspiration comes from the artist being particularly attuned to receive the signals from an external crisis.

In modern psychology, inspiration is not frequently studied, but it is generally seen as an entirely internal process. In each view, however, whether empiricist or mystical, inspiration is, by its nature, beyond control.

An example of a modern study on inspiration is one that was conducted by Takeshi Okada and Kentaro Ishibashi, published in 2016 in the multidisciplinary journal, Cognitive Science. In this three-part study, groups of Japanese undergraduate art students were observed to determine whether copying or simply musing upon example artworks that served as their inspiration would increase their creative output. The results of the first and second experiment revealed that copying artwork enabled the students to produce creative drawings that were qualitatively different, but only when the example—the inspiration—featured a style that was unfamiliar to the students. The third experiment revealed that only musing upon the unfamiliar inspiration produced the same effect as copying it. Okada and Ishibashi suggest that these unfamiliar examples were able to facilitate the creativity of the students because they challenged the students' perspectives on drawing. They admit, however, that it is unclear whether their results can be generalized to professional artists as well, but they cite examples of artists, namely Pablo Picasso and Vincent van Gogh, who extensively imitated the work of other artists, which might suggest that "imitation is an effective driver of creativity, even for experts."

== See also ==
- Afflatus, the Romantic concept of inspiration
- Automatic writing
- Divine spark
- Epiphany (feeling)
- Genius (literature), the development of the concept of the genius from daemon to innate gift
- Glossolalia (or speaking in tongues)
- Muses, the classical sources of inspiration
