= Elizabeth Bentley (writer) =

British writer (1767–1839)

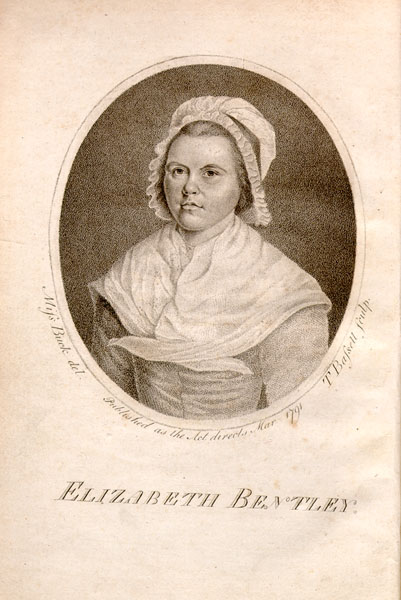
- Elizabeth Bentley, Genuine Poetical Compositions, on Various Subjects (Norwich, by subscription, 1791)
- Born: 1767; Norwich, England, UK
- Died: 1839 (aged 71–72); Norwich, England, UK
- Resting place: St Stephen's, Norwich
- Occupation: Poet
- Writing career
- Period: 1791–1821
- Subjects: Pastoral, Abolitionism, Animal welfare

Elizabeth Bentley (1767–1839) was an English poet, one of a small wave of British and Irish writers from the labouring classes in the eighteenth century. She was a local poet who was nonetheless engaged with larger political and social issues.

== Biography ==
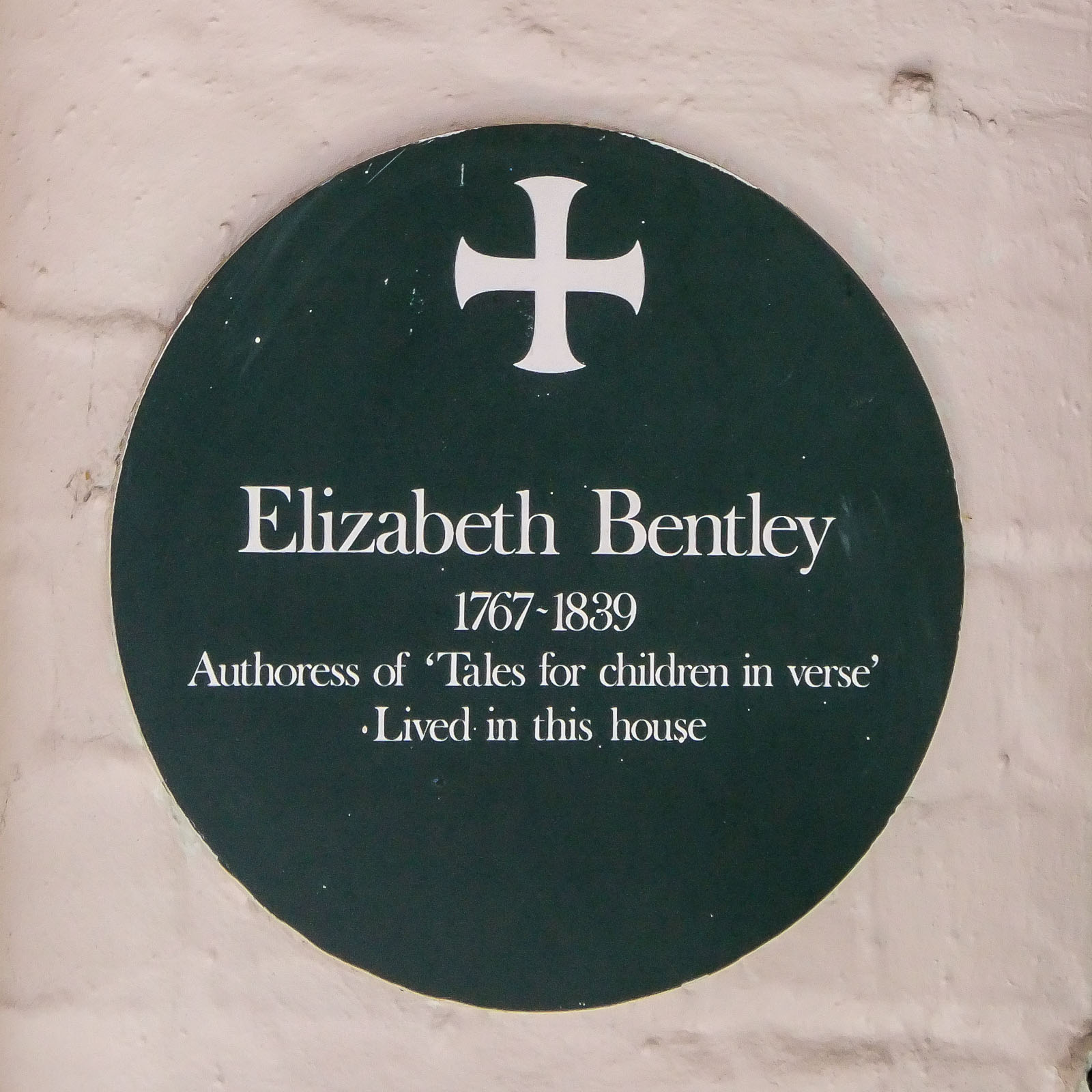
Plaque at Elizabeth Bentley's former home on St Stephens Square, Norwich

She was born in Norwich, the only child of Elizabeth Lawrence and Daniel Bentley. The latter, a journeyman cordwainer who had himself received a good education, educated Elizabeth, his only child. The family faced financial difficulties after he suffered a stroke in 1777 and was unable to work at his usual trade. He died in 1783 when his daughter was sixteen.

Two years later, Bentley reported a new-found desire to write poetry "which [she] had no thought or desire of being seen." However, in 1790 the following notice was published:

Speedily will be published, price two shillings and sixpence, The poetical compositions of Elizabeth Bentley; who, unimproved by education, Has given Proof of a strong Natural Genius; and Uses her best Endeavours to obtain a Livelihood by honest Industry, Living irreproachably with her aged Mother, near St. Stephen's gates, Norwich. The encouragers of indigent merit are entreated to favor the authoress with their names and subscriptions; Which will be taken by W. Stevenson, at the Norfolk Arms; and all the Booksellers in Norwich. Norwich, GB: printed by Crouse and Stevenson, 1790.

The resulting publication, Genuine Poetical Compositions (1791), had an impressive 1,935 subscribers, including literary notables Elizabeth Carter, Elizabeth Montagu, William Cowper, and Hester Chapone. As a labouring-class poet, Bentley—"content to be the last and lowest of the tuneful train"—adopted a humble stance towards her readers and let it be known that the venture was intended to establish an annuity for her mother and herself. Both her collections contained portraits of the author and accounts of her life "designed to raise patrons"; the account written in 1790 and published in the first volume is the source of most that is known of her. Her poetry celebrates the countryside and engages in public debates on topics such as abolitionism and cruelty to animals. Cowper compared her favourably with Mary Leapor, a labouring-class poet of the previous generation, citing her "strong natural genius." Modern critics note that Bentley's "submissive" tone no doubt played a part in her acceptance among middle-class readers.

After the publication of her first volume, Bentley kept a small boarding school and did not publish much – some poems for children which she co-authored with the prolific Ellenor Fenn; an ode on the Battle of Trafalgar (1805) – for three decades. This hiatus ended with the publication, by subscription, of her Poems in 1821.

She died on 13 April 1839, in an almshouse.

== Works ==
- Dedicated, by permission, to Wm. Drake, Jun. Esq. M.P. Genuine poetical compositions, on various subjects. By E. Bentley. Norwich, GB: printed by Crouse and Stevenson, for the authoress, and may be had of her near the Norfolk and Norwich Hospital; or of W. Stevenson, in the Market-Place. MDCCXCI. (entered at Stationers' Hall), 1791. (Etext, British Women Romantic Poets Project) (Etext, Google Books)
- With Ellenor Fenn. A miscellany in prose and verse, for young persons. Designed particularly for the amusement of Sunday scholars. London: Printed and sold by John Marshall, No. 4, Aldermary Church-Yard, Bow-Lane, and No. 17, Queen-Street, Cheapside, 1798.
- An Ode on the Glorious Victory Over the French and Spanish Fleets, on the 21st of October, 1805, and the Death of Lord Nelson. Norwich: Stevenson and Matchett, 1805. (Etext, Google Books)
- With Ellenor Fenn. A Miscellany, in Prose and Verse, for Young Persons, on Sunday. By Mrs. Lovechild. London: J. Harris, 1807.
- Poems; Being the Genuine Compositions of Elizabeth Bentley, of Norwich. Norwich, GB: Sold by the Author, near the Norfolk and Norwich Hospital; Sold also by Messrs. Taylor and Hessey, 93, Fleet-Street, London; Stevenson, Matchett, and Stevenson, Norwich; Messrs. Deightons, Cambridge; and All Other Booksellers, 1821. (Etext, Google Books)
- Miscellaneous Poems; Being the Genuine Compositions of Elizabeth Bentley, of Norwich. Third Volume. Norwich, GB: Printed by Matchett, Stevenson, and Matchett, Market-Place, 1835. (Etext, Google Books)

== See also ==
- List of 18th-century British working-class writers

== Resources ==
- Blain, Virginia, et al., eds. "Bentley, Elizabeth." The Feminist Companion to Literature in English. New Haven and London: Yale UP, 1990. 85.
- Brown, Susan, et al. "Elizabeth Bentley." Orlando: Women's Writing in the British Isles from the Beginnings to the Present. Ed. Susan Brown, Patricia Clements, and Isobel Grundy. Cambridge University Press. Cambridge UP, n.d. 22 Mar. 2013. Accessed 8 Sept. 2022.
- Jackson Bibliography of Romantic Poetry. "Elizabeth Bentley." University of Toronto Library. Accessed 8 Sept. 2022.
- Landry, Donna. "Bentley, Elizabeth (bap. 1767, d. 1839)." Oxford Dictionary of National Biography. Ed. H. C. G. Matthew and Brian Harrison. Oxford: OUP, 2004. 12 April 2007.
- "Bentley, Elizabeth." The Women's Print History Project, 2019, Person ID 680. Accessed 2022-09-08.
