= John Stagg (poet) =

English poet (1770–1823)

John Stagg (1770–1823) was an English poet from Cumberland, where he was known as the "blind bard". He is now remembered for "The Vampyre" (1810).

== Life ==
Stagg was born at Burgh-by-Sands, near Carlisle, where his father, a tailor, possessed a small property. His parents decided to educate him for the church, but while he was still young an accident deprived him of his sight and put an end to his studies. For some time he made a livelihood by keeping a library in Wigton and playing his fiddle.

In his twentieth year he married. After leaving Wigton for Carlisle, he moved to Manchester, where he remained more or less till his death. He visited Cumberland, and also went further afield selling his works, and about 1809 visited Oxford.

Stagg died at Workington in 1823. He was father of seven children. In Charles Howard, 11th Duke of Norfolk, and the Cumberland gentry, as well as among members of both English universities, he had found patrons.

== Works ==
Stagg first published a volume of Miscellaneous Poems (1790). He was encouraged by patronage to publish his Minstrel of the North, London, 1810 (another edition 1816). His other works were:

- Miscellaneous Poems (Carlisle, 1804; 2nd ed. Workington, 1805);
- a further series of Miscellaneous Poems (Wigton, 1807; another ed., Wigton, 1808); and
- The Cumberland Minstrel: being a poetical miscellany of legendary, Gothic, and romantic tales … together with several essays in the Northern dialect, also a number of original pieces (3 vols. Manchester, 1821).

== Notes ==
Attribution

This article incorporates text from a publication now in the public domain: Lee, Sidney, ed. (1898). "Stagg, John". Dictionary of National Biography. Vol. 53. London: Smith, Elder & Co.

== See also ==
- List of 18th-century British working-class writers
